= 2024 European Parliament election in Cyprus =

- 9 June 2024

6 Cypriot seats to the European Parliament
- Opinion polls
- Turnout: 58.86% (▲13.87pp)
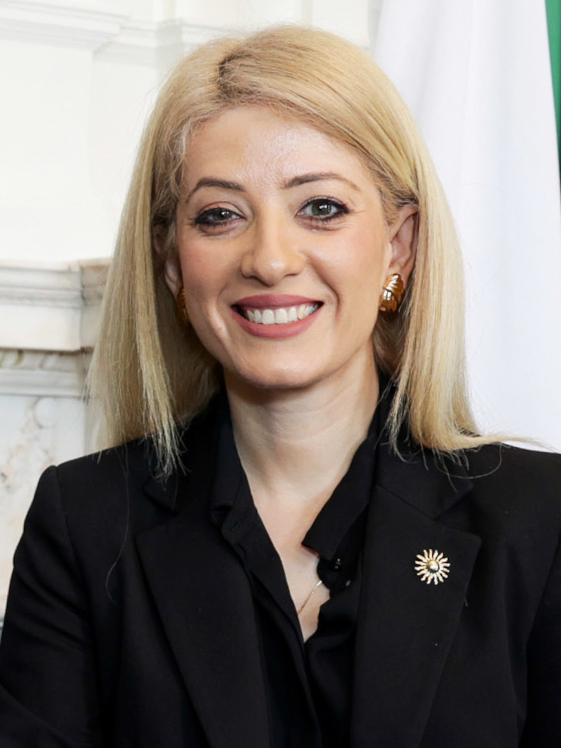

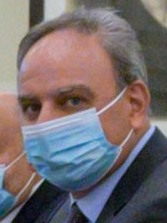

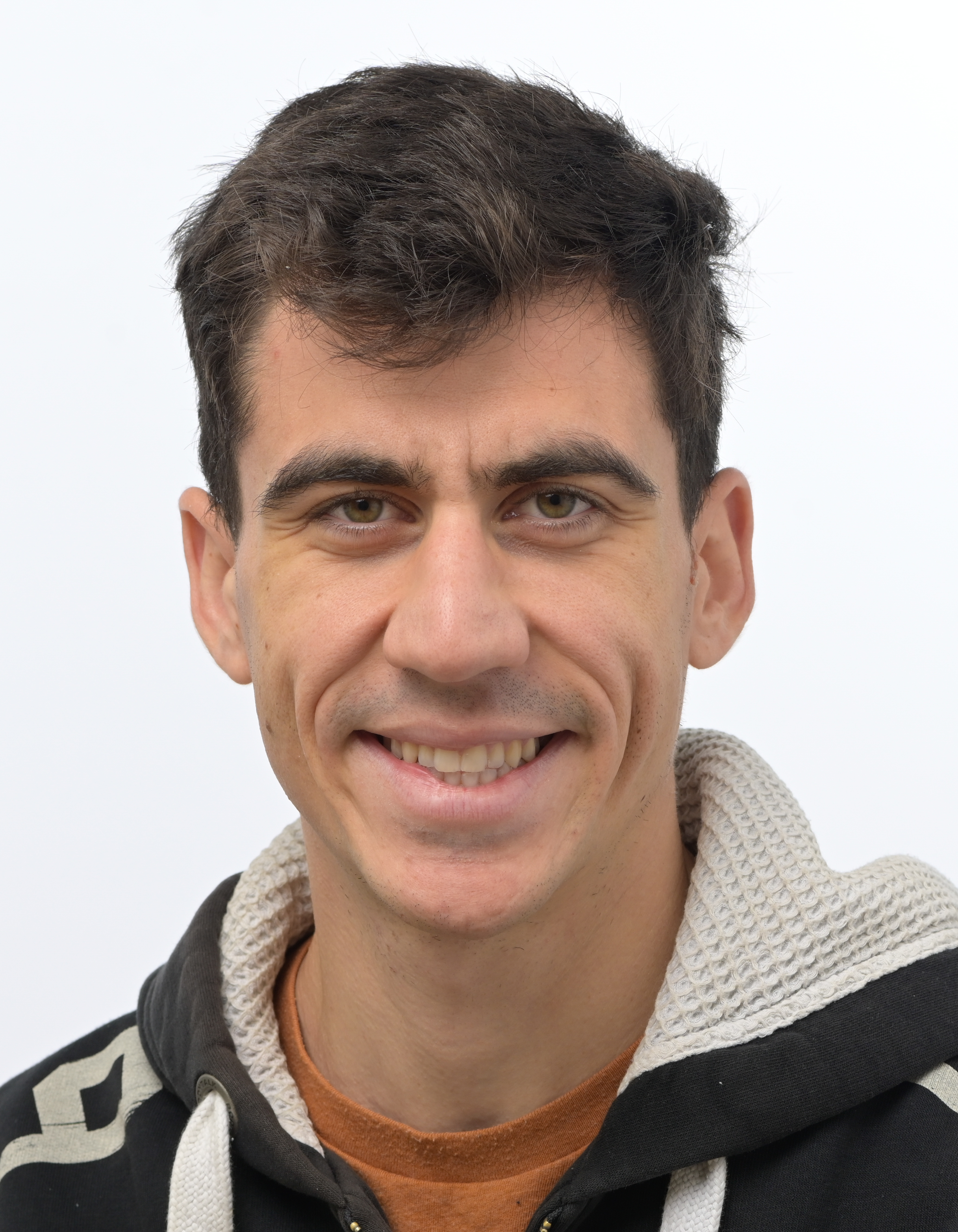

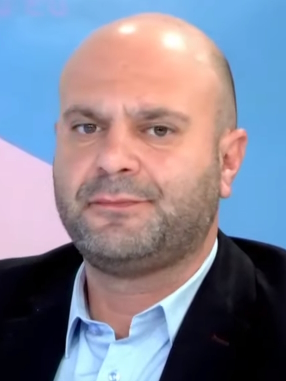

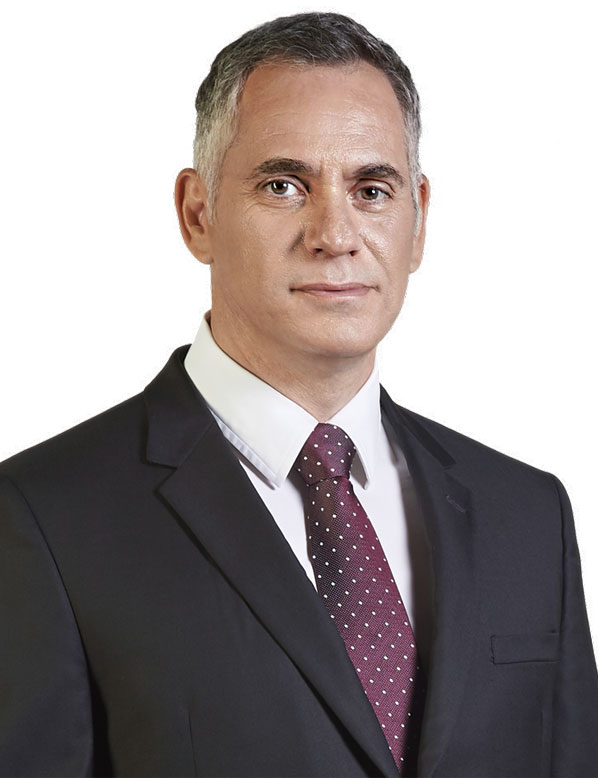

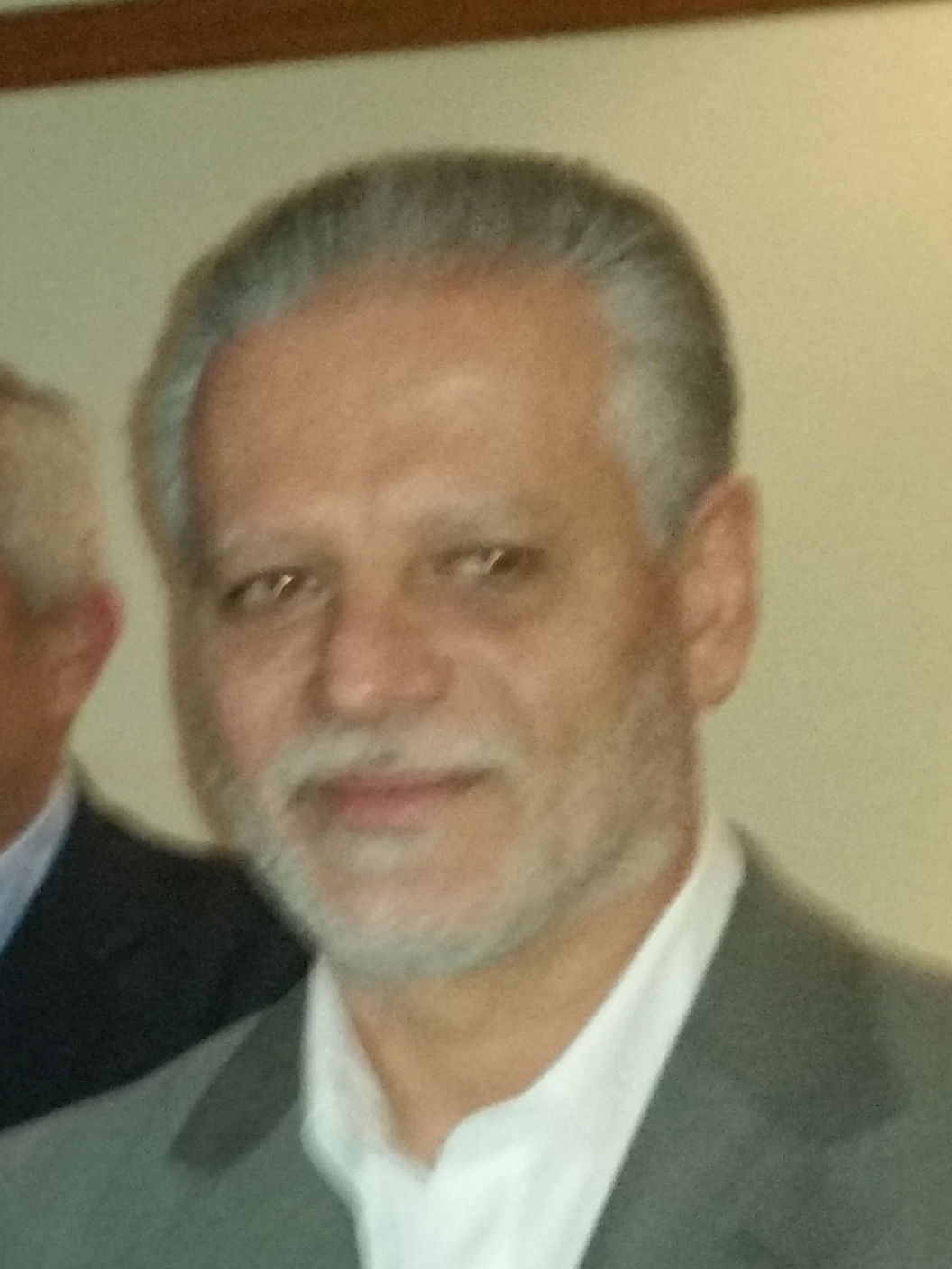
	First party	Second party	Third party
Leader	Annita Demetriou	Stefanos Stefanou	Fidias Panayiotou
Party	DISY	AKEL	Independent
Alliance	EPP	The Left	NI
Last election	29.02%, 2 seats	27.49%, 2 seats	New
Seats before	2	2	New
Seats won	2	1	1
Seat change	Steady	▼1	▲1
Popular vote	91,316	79,163	71,330
Percentage	24.78%	21.49%	19.36%
Swing	▼4.24	▼6.0	▲19.36
	Fourth party	Fifth party	Sixth party
Leader	Christos Christou	Nikolas Papadopoulos	Marinos Sizopoulos
Party	ELAM	DIKO	EDEK
Alliance	ECR	S&D	S&D
Last election	8.25 %, 0 seats	13.80%, 1 seat	10.58%, 1 seat
Seats before	0	1	1
Seats won	1	1	0
Seat change	▲1	Steady	▼1
Popular vote	41,215	35,815	18,681
Percentage	11.19%	9.72%	5.07%
Swing	▲2.94	▼4.08	▼5.51
- Results by communities and municipalities

The 2024 European Parliament elections in Cyprus was held on 9 June 2024 as part of the 2024 European Parliament election. This was the fifth parliamentary election since Cyprus's EU accession in 2004.

The centre-right Democratic Rally (DISY), which has won every previous election to this body, emerged victorious again with 24.8% of the votes, securing 2 seats. The communist party AKEL followed with 21.5% and 1 seat.

Independent candidate Fidias Panayiotou, a well-known YouTuber and TikToker, finished third with 19.4% of the votes, earning one seat in the European Parliament. Panayiotou had no support from any party, making him the first elected independent MEP in the history of Cyprus. His election sent shockwaves through the Cypriot political system, with Fidias finishing within several percentage points behind AKEL and DISY, which have dominated the Cypriot political system since independence. The 24-year-old YouTuber, with no political experience, gained a seat at the expense of well-established parties like ELAM, DIKO and EDEK.

== Background ==
To reduce costs, the election was held concurrently with the municipal elections. Voters were provided with six different ballots.

This was the first such vote to take place since the withdrawal of the United Kingdom from the European Union. Also known as 'Brexit', the move impacted Cyprus due to ties linked to its status as a fellow Commonwealth member and former UK colony.

The election was primarily focused on the issue of illegal migration, with President Nikos Christodoulides declaring that Cyprus is in "a state of serious crisis". Due to the Gaza war, the number of illegal migrants in Cyprus skyrocketed, with more than 2,000 people arriving in the first three months of 2024, compared to just 78 in the same period the previous year. According to the president, 7% of the Cypriot population now consists of migrants. This increasing migrational upheaval led to a significant rise in the poll numbers of the far-right, anti-immigration party ELAM, whose manifesto is primarily focused on illegal migration.

The independent candidacy of 24-year-old YouTuber and TikToker Fidias Panayiotou was initially viewed as a joke and was ignored by political parties. Panayiotou was open about his lack of political knowledge and did not express any concrete political positions. However, his adept use of social media successfully crafted his image as the main anti-establishment and anti-partisan candidate. His name appeared in opinion polls just one month before the election, showing single-digit voting intentions and zero seat projections.

This election was the European Parliament election with the highest number of Turkish Cypriot candidates from different parties. The incumbent Member of the Parliament Niyazi Kizilyurek was running again with AKEL, the new founded party Volt Cyprus was showing Hulusi Kilim as a lead candidate, and Oz Karahan was running as a candidate from KOSP. The government also started campaigns for including the Turkish Cypriots more into the elections.

The Democratic Rally (DISY) has won every election since the island's accession into the EU in 2004, though the party recently suffered defeat in the presidential election.

=== Democratic Rally ===
Nine DISY personalities announced their interest for the European Parliament Elections. The six nominees were selected through an internal election process, with former Health Minister Michalis Hatzipantelas emerging as the top candidate.

Marios Pelekanos, one of the three vice presidents of the Democratic Rally, finished second to last in the internal election and was not included in the list of six nominees. Pelekanos expressed profound dissatisfaction and subsequently resigned from his position within the party leadership, citing a series of underlying events that had undermined his standing. After multi-day discussions with ELAM, on March 22, 2024, it was announced that he would run in the European Elections as a candidate of the ultranationalist party. The leader of the Democratic Rally, Annita Demetriou, harshly condemned this move, and the center-right party proceeded by deleting Pelekanos from its registry, emphasising the vast differences in politics between the two parties.

Despite numerous challenges, including the candidacy of Marios Pelekanos with ELAM, Eleni Theocharous with DIKO, and Pantelis Poietis with DIPA, as well as many corruption scandals from Anastasiades' administration and widespread dissatisfaction with DISY's role as the main opposition in Christodoulides' government (with various DISY members in the current cabinet despite the party's stance as opposition), the centre-right party managed to achieve another first-place finish, maintaining its two seats in the European Parliament. However, the 24.8% of the popular vote is the worst result in the party's history, significantly lower than the 29% in the 2019 election and the 37.8% in the 2014 election.

=== Progressive Party of Working People ===
Anna Theologou, leader of the centre-left party Generation Change, is featured as one of AKEL's candidates, effectively merging the two parties. Theologou is regarded as a highly reputable politician, with the ability to attract votes to the communist party based on her personal influence.

After consistently placing second in every European Parliament Election, some opinion polls indicated a surge in the party's performance relative to the frontrunner DISY, with some polls even positioning it in the first place. Moreover, the opinion polls did not include Turkish Cypriot voters, although they have the right to vote. Since AKEL's candidates included the Turkish Cypriot Niyazi Kizilyurek, the Turkish Cypriot vote was expected to boost the percentage for the left-wing party even more.

Despite these expectations, AKEL experienced its worst defeat in its history, receiving just 21.5% of the votes, only 2 percentage points ahead of independent candidate and YouTuber Fidias Panayiotou. The party lost one of its two seats and now, for the first time in its history, holds only one seat in the European Parliament.

=== National Popular Front ===
The far-right party ELAM was projected by all opinion polls to secure its first seat in the European Parliament. Formerly considered on the fringe, the party was now anticipated to achieve a third-place finish, surpassing DIKO, with every poll indicating a percentage higher than 13%. Known for its anti-establishment and often labeled extremist positions, the party was now being considered "mainstream" for the first time, as illegal migration became the most important issue for Cypriot voters.

The party announced the candidacy of Pavlos Ioannou, who served as the financial commissioner of Cyprus from 2013 to 2023. The candidacy of the reputable figure caused surprise and was anticipated to attract more moderate voters to the party often referred to as "extremist". Notably, Ioannou clarified that he is not a member of ELAM but has been granted complete freedom of speech and disagreement by the party. He emphasized that his views align more with rationalism rather than far-right ideologies. Additionally, Ioannou stated his commitment not to vote against the rights of the LGBTQ+ community in potential European votes, provided that the rights of other groups were not impeded.

The announcement of Marios Pelekanos' candidacy with ELAM, who had been serving as vice president of the centre-right DISY until a few weeks prior, created a political upheaval. Pelekanos, who also held the position of government spokesperson in Anastasiades' administration from 2021 to 2023, was believed to have the potential to attract a considerable number of DISY voters to ELAM.

The party did succeed in securing its first seat, winning 3 percentage points more than in 2019, but the "Fidias Phenomenon" likely hindered its rising momentum, with the vote share of 11.2% being lower than what most opinion polls predicted.

=== Democratic Party ===
Despite finishing third in all previous European elections, the Democratic Party (DIKO) now appeared fourth in every opinion poll released, falling below the far-right ELAM.

The party's candidates featured the veteran politician and paediatric surgeon Eleni Theocharous, who had served as an MEP from 2009 to 2019 initially with DISY and later with the newly established Solidarity Movement. The conservative politician, who was ranked 3 times as the second best MEP by the DEVE Committee, was widely considered a strong candidate to attract nationalist voters away from ELAM.

The list also featured biochemist Leondios Kostrikis, who served as a member of the Advisory Committee of the Ministry of Health during the COVID-19 pandemic in Cyprus. The Professor is also internationally known for his discovery of a new COVID-19 variant in January 2022, the so-called "Deltacron", at the University of Cyprus.

The historic party, which had consistently finished third in every legislative and European election in Cyprus since its foundation in 1976, suffered a significant defeat. The vote share of 9.7% marked the first single-digit result in the party's history, and the fifth-place finish was its lowest ranking. The well-established party, with tens of thousands of members, received 10 percentage points less than the 24-year-old YouTuber Fidias Panayiotou, who ran as an independent candidate with no political experience. Despite this setback, DIKO managed to retain its seat, re-electing incumbent MEP Costas Mavrides.

=== EDEK Socialist Party ===
According to all opinion polls, the centre-left party EDEK was projected to lose its seat in the European Parliament. Critics accused the party of losing its identity, with some even claiming that many of its political positions became indistinguishable from those of the far-right party ELAM.

EDEK received 5.1% of the popular vote, marking the lowest percentage in its 55-year history. The "traditional 4th-place party" lost its seat in the European Parliament (which it had consistently secured since 2009) and finished 6th, marking its lowest place in history.

=== Movement of Ecologists – Citizens' Cooperation ===
After the merge of its alliance party SYPOL with EDEK in 2021, the green party KOSP cooperated with Echmi Movement and Union of Cypriots for the 2024 European Election.

In October 2023, Alexandra Attalides, one of the three elected KOSP MPs, resigned from the party. She cited dissatisfaction with the party's stance on the Cyprus problem, its inability to produce concrete and comprehensive policy proposals, and the vindictive behaviour of its collective members. Attalides also accused the party of diverging from the policies, principles, and values of the European Greens, promoting xenophobia, and failing to oppose large-scale developments that harm the environment. In November 2023, Alexandra Attalides announced her membership in the newly established Volt Cyprus, and the following month, she was elected as the party's president.

The day after Alexandra Attalides' shocking resignation and her serious accusations, the president of KOSP, Charalambos Theopemptou, resigned from his position. Following an internal election, the presidency returned to George Perdikes, who had previously served as the party's president from 2014 to 2020.

Following Alexandra Attalides' resignation, more resignations ensued, including 16 of the 67 members of the Central Committee. Efi Xanthou, a 2019 candidate for the European Parliament and George Perdikes' opponent in the internal election after Charalambos Theopemptou's resignation, left the party in May 2024, accusing it of making undemocratic decisions.

On March 21, 2024, Fidias Panayiotou, a globally renowned Cypriot YouTuber, confirmed speculations that he was approached by the KOSP to be included in their list of six candidates for the European elections. Panayiotou engaged his audience by conducting a poll on TikTok to gauge their opinion on his potential candidacy, offering two options: running as a member of KOSP or running independently. Out of a total of 10,000 participants, 70% favored the latter option. Consequently, Panayiotou announced his decision to pursue an independent candidacy.

After facing numerous challenges and resignations, the party received its worst result since 2001, garnering just 1.3% of the popular vote and failing to secure any seats. This marked a significant decline from the 3.29% achieved in the 2019 European election, leaving the party with only one-third of its previous political power.

=== Volt Cyprus ===
On October 26, 2023, the New Wave and Famagusta for Cyprus movements announced their merger, resulting in the formation of Volt Cyprus as a political party. The Cyprus branch of Volt Europa was officially established on December 3, 2023, shortly after the resignation of MP Alexandra Attalides from KOSP.

Alexandra Attalides, who received the 2021 "International Anti-Corruption Champions Award" from the United States, was elected as the party's president. Attalides prioritised addressing climate change, corruption, the Cyprus problem, the rise of the far-right, and immigration as the main focuses for the party.

The party's candidates for the European Elections include Makarios Drousiotis, a political activist, journalist, and writer. Drousiotis had garnered significant attention following the publication of a trilogy of books containing personal accounts and third-party documents uncovering extensive corruption scandals during the presidency of Nicos Anastasiades. His third publication, "Mafia State," instigated a criminal investigation against Anastasiades, prompting the involvement of international legal practitioner Gabrielle Louise McIntyre.

Despite being a newcomer, the party received 2.9% of the votes, surpassing KOSP and DIPA, both of which hold seats in the House of Representatives. Makarios Drousiotis received the most votes among the six candidates of Volt Cyprus. However, the party did not secure any seats.

=== Democratic Alignment ===
Pantelis Poietis, formerly the Deputy Secretary of International Relations of the Democratic Rally (DISY), is now one of the six candidates nominated by DIPA for the European Elections. After resigning from DISY on September 9, 2022, Poietis supported Nicos Christodoulides in the 2023 Presidential Election, who stood as an opposing candidate to DISY's Averof Neofytou.

=== Fidias Panayiotou ===
Fidias Panayiotou, a 24-year-old YouTuber, turned down an offer to join the Ecologists' electoral list and instead announced his independent candidacy for this election. He initiated a social media campaign with the goal of increasing youth voter registration. On 30 March 2024, he live-streamed himself on YouTube running 80 km from Kyrenia to Larnaca to encourage young people to register for the election. On that day alone, over 2000 new voter registrations were recorded. He also launched a podcast series, interviewing renowned political and non-political personalities, to engage both himself and his audience in political discussions.

His candidacy was initially widely viewed as a joke and not perceived as a threat by political parties. The fact that no independent candidate had ever come close to being elected as an MEP in the history of Cyprus combined with his political illiteracy, made Panayiotou an outsider. It wasn't until one month before the election that his name started appearing in opinion polls, and even then, with single-digit voting intentions. The sudden increase in Fidias' percentages was dubbed the "Fidias Phenomenon," highlighting how an independent candidate with no political experience could shake up the Cypriot political system.

Fidias ran on an anti-partisan and anti-establishment platform, accusing establishment politicians of neglecting society's best interests and failing to understand critical modern developments such as AI and Bitcoin. He emphasised education as a priority, aiming to enhance schools in both Cyprus and the EU by eliminating exams and promoting self-education. He also acknowledged the significance of adapting to the impact of artificial intelligence on future developments. Regarding the Cyprus issue, Panayiotou leaned towards the "Bi-zonal, Bi-communal Federation" solution while expressing a willingness to learn more about the complexities involved. Additionally, he advocated for a measured approach to migration, proposing that asylum applications should be processed from applicants' home countries before their arrival in Cyprus.

Fidias' electoral success was attributed to his adept use of social media and the widespread dissatisfaction of the public with the current political system. Without spending any money on TV advertisements, billboards, or Google ads, he crafted his image as the primary anti-establishment candidate purely through daily, non-sponsored YouTube shorts. Some journalists described this as Cyprus entering an era of "metapolitics," where protest votes were able to elect an "apolitical," independent candidate.

The unprecedented result of 19.4% was just 2 percentage points lower than the left-wing AKEL, a party with nearly 100 years of history that, along with DISY, has dominated the Cypriot political system since the country's independence. The third-place finish of the independent candidate sent shockwaves through the Cypriot political system, with the well-established DIKO, traditionally the third-place party, receiving 10 percentage points less than him. Fidias also surpassed the far-right ELAM, which had been anticipated to thrive due to the recent surge in illegal migration.

Following his election as an MEP, Fidias announced plans to create a new "party in the European Parliament" with other like-minded MEPs. He also expressed interest in joining the Education Committee of the EU and suggested the creation of a new Social Media and AI Committee.

== Electoral system ==
Along with Luxembourg and Malta, Cyprus is the smallest constituency, electing 6 Members of the European Parliament. The seats are distributed via open list proportional representation.

== Parties that stood candidates ==
List/Party	Main ideologies	European Party or alliance	European Parliament Group	Candidates	2019 result	
List/Party	Main ideologies	European Party or alliance	European Parliament Group	Candidates	Votes (%)	Seats
Democratic Rally (DISY); Δημοκρατικός Συναγερμός (ΔΗΣΥ); Demokratik Seferberlik	Christian democracy; Liberal conservatism; Pro-Europeanism	EPP	EPP Group	1. Loukas Fourlas; 2. Eleni Stavrou; 3. Michalis Hatzipantelas; 4. Constantinos Petrides; 5. Christina Xenofontos; 6. Christos Angelides	29.02%	2 / 6
Progressive Party of Working People (AKEL); Ανορθωτικό Κόμμα Εργαζόμενου Λαού (ΑΚΕΛ); Emekçi Halkın İlerici Partisi	Communism; Marxism–Leninism; Soft Euroscepticism	none	The Left	1. Giorgos Georgiou; 2. Niyazi Kızılyürek; 3. Anna Theologou; 4. Stavri Kalopsidioti; 5. Andros Karayiannis; 6. Melani Steliou	27.49%	2 / 6
Democratic Party (DIKO); Δημοκρατικό Κόμμα (ΔΗΚΟ); Demokratik Parti	Centrism; Greek Cypriot nationalism; Anti-federalism; Pro-Europeanism	none	S&D	1. Eleni Theocharous; 2. Leondios Kostrikis; 3. Costas Mavrides; 4. Mary Lambrou; 5. Chrisis Pantelides; 6. Katerina Christofidou	13.80%	1 / 6
National Popular Front (ELAM); Εθνικό Λαϊκό Μέτωπο (ΕΛΑΜ); Ulusal Halk Cephesi	Ultranationalism; Greek Cypriot nationalism; Metaxism; Neo-fascism; Euroscepticism	ECR	ECR Group	1. Geadis Geadis; 2. Marios Pelekanos; 3. Pavlos Ioannou; 4. Maria Nikolaou; 5. Polis Anoyiriatis; 6. Ioannis Linos Chatzigeorgiou	8.25%	0 / 6
EDEK Socialist Party (EDEK); Κίνημα Σοσιαλδημοκρατών (ΕΔΕΚ); EDEK Sosyalist Parti	Greek Cypriot nationalism; Anti-federalism; Social democracy	PES	S&D	1. Nikos Anastasiou; 2. Andreas Apostolou; 3. Pandelitsa Yiokka; 4. Vivian Kanari; 5. Elias Myrianthous; 6. Nikolas Philippou	10.58%	1 / 6
Democratic Front (DIPA); Δημοκρατική Παράταξη (ΔΗΠΑ); Demokratik Cephe	Liberalism; Centrism; Cypriot federalism	ALDE	Renew	1. Alekos Tryfonides; 2. Marinos Kleanthous; 3. Themis Anthopoulou; 4. Marios Eleftheriou; 5. Marios Charalambides; 6. Pantelis Poietis	3.80%	0 / 6
Movement of Ecologists – Citizens' Cooperation (KOSP); Κίνημα Οικολόγων - Συνεργασία Πολιτών; Ekolojistler Hareketi – Yurttaşlar İşbirliği	Green politics; Anti-federalism; Greek Cypriot nationalism	EGP	—N/a	1. Oz Karahan; 2. Petros Christodoulou; 3. Alkis Papis; 4. Maria Kola; 5. Stavros Papadouris; 6. Vaso Pelegari	3.29%	0 / 6
Volt Cyprus (Volt); Βολτ Κύπρος (ΒΟΛΤ); Volt Kıbrıs	European federalism; Progressivism; Pro-Europeanism; Cypriot federalism	Volt	—N/a	1. Andromachi Sophocleous; 2. Hulusi Kilim; 3. Lysia Demetriou; 4. Makarios Drousiotis; 5. Nicholas Kyriakou; 6. Sophia Vasileiou	New	New
Animal Party Cyprus; Κόμμα για τα Ζώα Κύπρου; Kıbrıs Hayvan Partisi	Animal rights; Animal welfare	APEU	—N/a	1. Kyriakos Kyriakou	0.79%	0 / 6
Active Citizens – Movement of Cypriot United Hunters; Ενεργοί πολίτες - Κίνημα Ενωμένων Κύπριων Κυνηγών; Aktif Vatandaşlar – Kıbrıs Birleşmiş Avcılar Hareketi	Pro-hunting; Agrarianism; Social conservatism	—N/a	—N/a	1. Nikolas Prodromou; 2. Dmitry Apraksin; 3. Adamos Vrahimis; 4. Lefteris Theodorou; 5. Georgia Constantinidou; 6. Panikkos Pilalis	New	New
National Action Movement; Κίνημα Εθνική Δράσις; Millî Eylem Hareketi	Ultraconservatism; Neo-fascism; Ultranationalism	—N/a	—N/a	1. Giorgos Nikolaou; 2. Panos Panayi; 3. Stathis Pafites; 4. Constantinos Tsangarides; 5. Charalambos Takkas	New	New
Victory; Νίκη; Zafer	Greek Cypriot ultranationalism	—N/a	—N/a	1. Andreas Nikolaou	New	New
Independents		—N/a	—N/a	1. Fidias Panayiotou; 2. Andronikos Zervides		

=== Election ballot ===
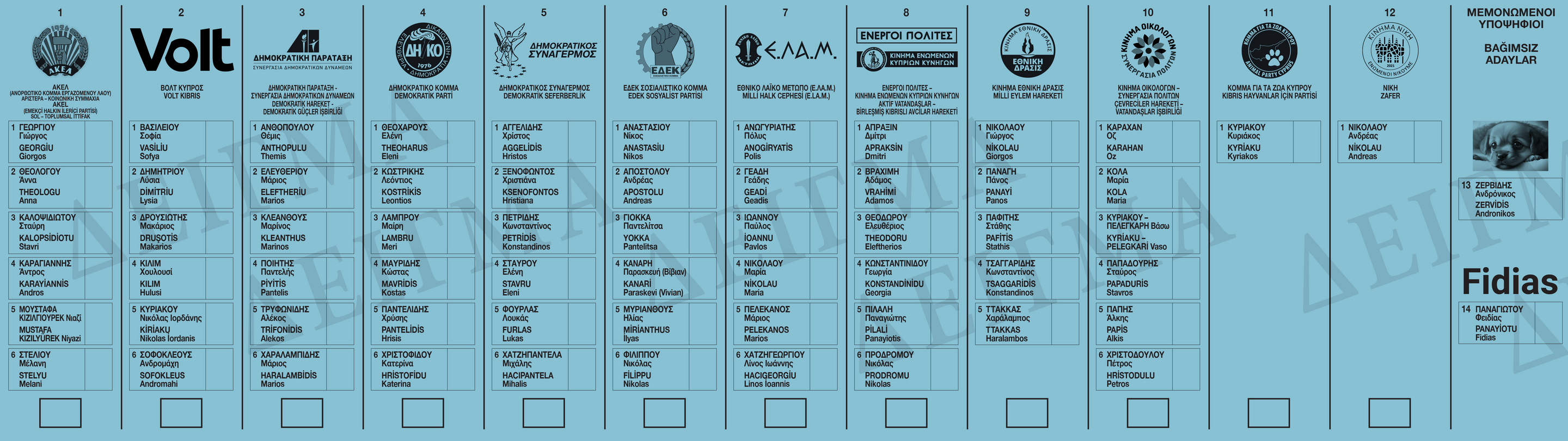

== Opinion polling ==
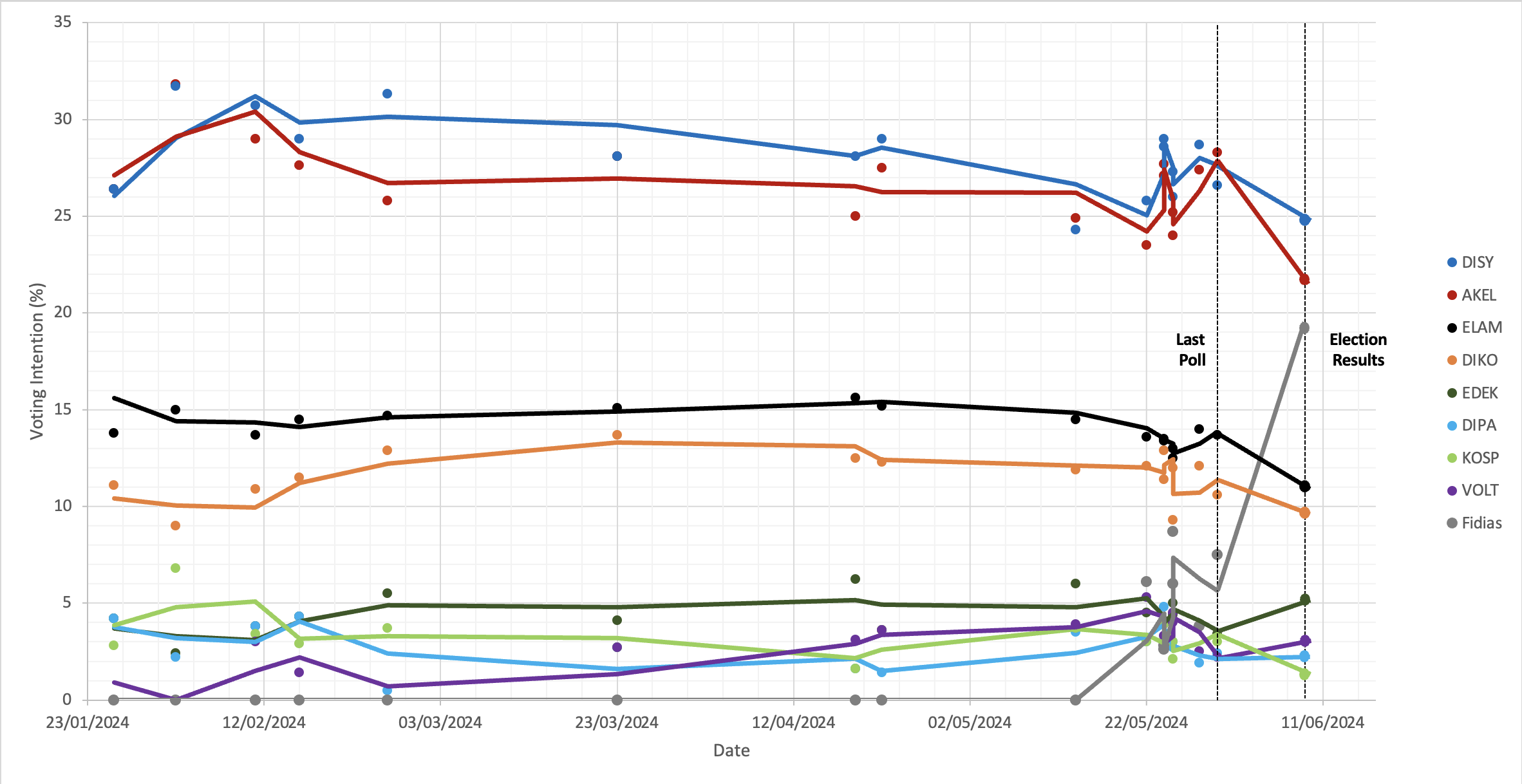

Date	Polling firm	DISY EPP	AKEL Left	ELAM ECR	DIKO S&D	EDEK S&D	DIPA Renew	KOSP G/EFA	APC Left	EP NI	VOLT G/EFA	Fidias NI	Others	Lead
9 June 2024	Election Results	24.8	21.5	11.2	9.7	5.1	2.2	1.3	0.3	1.3	2.9	19.4	0.3	3.3
27-30 May 2024	IMR	26.6	28.3	13.7	10.6	3.4	3.0	3.2	-	2.0	2.8	7.5	0.6	1.7
22-28 May 2024	CMRC	28.7	27.4	14.0	12.1	3.8	1.9	3.8	1.9	-	3.8	3.8	1.3	1.3
20-25 May 2024	RAI Consultants	27.3	25.2	12.5	9.3	4.4	2.7	2.1	0.9	2.1	4.5	8.7	0.3	2.1
13-25 May 2024	CYMAR Market Research Ltd	26.0	24.0	13.0	12.0	5.0	3.0	3.0	-	-	4.0	6.0	4.0	2.0
20-24 May 2024	Symmetron	25.6	24.2	12.0	10.2	3.7	4.3	2.6	-	-	3.9	2.5	1.6	1.5
17-24 May 2024	SIGMA	29.0	27.7	13.5	12.9	3.9	2.6	3.9	-	-	2.6	2.6	1.3	1.3
16-22 May 2024	Pulse Market Research	25.8	23.5	13.6	12.1	4.5	3.0	3.0	-	-	5.3	6.1	3.0	2.3
9-14 May 2024	Analytica Market Research	24.3	24.9	14.5	11.9	6.0	3.5	3.7	-	3.3	3.9	-	4.0	0.6
10-22 Apr 2024	CMRC	29.0	27.5	15.2	12.3	3.6	1.4	3.6	2.9	-	3.6	-	0.7	1.5
08-19 Apr 2024	CYMAR Market Research Ltd	28.1	25.0	15.6	12.5	6.3	1.6	1.6	-	-	3.1	-	6.3	3.1
14–23 Mar 2024	SIGMA	28.1	28.1	15.1	13.7	4.1	2.7	2.7	-	-	2.7	-	2.7	0
20–26 Feb 2024	Pulse Market Research	31.3	25.8	14.7	12.9	5.5	0.5	3.7	-	-	-	-	5.5	5.5
12–16 Feb 2024	SIGMA	29.0	27.5	14.5	11.6	4.3	4.3	2.9	1.4	-	1.4	-	2.9	1.5
11 Feb 2024	Symmetron	25.3	23.9	11.3	9.0	3.1	3.1	2.8	-	-	2.5	-	1.5	1.7
29 Jan – 02 Feb 2024	Interview	31.7	31.8	15	9.0	2.4	2.2	6.8	-	-	-	-	1.1	0.1
22–26 Jan 2024	L.S.Prime	26.4	26.4	13.8	11.1	4.2	4.2	2.8	-	-	-	-	11.1	0
03–11 Jan 2024	IMR	25.7	27.8	17.4	9.7	3.2	3.3	4.9	-	-	1.8	-	3.5	2.1
30 May	Election 2021	27.8%	22.3%	6.8%	11.3%	6.7%	6.1%	4.4%	1.0%	3.3%	-		10.3%	5.5
26 May	Election 2019	29.0%	27.5%	8.2%	13.8%	10.6%	3.8%	-	0.8%	-	-		3.0%	1.5

== Results ==
Party	Votes	%	Seats	+/–
Democratic Rally	91,316	24.78	2	0
Progressive Party of Working People	79,163	21.49	1	–1
Independent – Fidias Panayiotou	71,330	19.36	1	New
National Popular Front	41,215	11.19	1	+1
Democratic Party	35,815	9.72	1	0
EDEK Socialist Party	18,681	5.07	0	–1
Volt Cyprus	10,777	2.92	0	New
Democratic Alignment	7,988	2.17	0	0
Movement of Ecologists – Citizens' Cooperation	4,742	1.29	0	New
Movement of Cypriot United Hunters	4,603	1.25	0	New
Animal Party Cyprus	1,013	0.27	0	0
National Action Movement	979	0.27	0	New
Independent – Andronikos Zervides	444	0.12	0	New
Victory Movement	389	0.11	0	New
Total	368,455	100.00	6	0
Valid votes	368,455	91.59		
Invalid votes	8,450	2.10		
Blank votes	25,371	6.31		
Total votes	402,276	100.00		
Registered voters/turnout	683,432	58.86		
Source: https://live.elections.moi.gov.cy/

=== Elected MEPs ===
Name	Photograph	Personal votes	National Party	EP Group
Fidias Panayiotou		71,330	Independent	NI
Loukas Fourlas		52,590	Democratic Rally	EPP
Giorgos Georgiou		32,759	Progressive Party of Working People	EUL–NGL
Michalis Hatzipantelas		30,953	Democratic Rally	EPP
Costas Mavrides		20,494	Democratic Party	S&D
Geadis Geadi		14,705	ELAM	ECR
