= Alexandra Attalides =

Cypriot politician

- Αλεξάνδρα Ατταλίδου
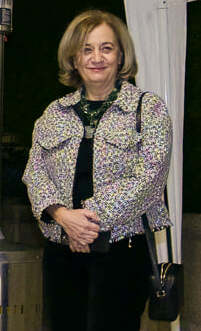
- Attalides in 2021

Leader of Volt Cyprus
- Incumbent
- Assumed office 3 December 2023

Member of the Cypriot House of Representatives
- In office 2021–2026
- Constituency: Nicosia

Personal details
- Born: 25 December 1958 (age 67) Kakopetria, Nicosia, Colony of Cyprus
- Party: Volt Cyprus; KOSP (until 2023)
- Children: 1 son
- Education: Free University of Brussels

Alexandra Attalides (born 25 December 1958) is a Greek Cypriot politician. She was a member of parliament for the constituency of Nicosia from 2021-2026.

== Career ==
Alexandra Attalides was born in Kakopetria on Christmas Day in 1958. She studied Communication and Public Relations ande received her Master's degree in European Management (MBA) from the Free University of Brussels, a Diploma in Technical Analysis of Financial Markets, a Diploma in Tourism Studies and a Travel Guide Diploma. She is an accredited member (Advanced) of the Cyprus Securities and Exchange Commission. She was Vice President of the Journalistic Ethics Committee and a member of the Council of the Mediterranean Institute for Social and Gender Studies. She was Press Officer of the European Parliament Office in Cyprus in the period 2008-2020 and Deputy Head in the period 2013–2015.

== Politics ==
Attalides was elected as a member of parliament for the Nicosia constituency for the Movement of Ecologists – Citizens' Cooperation in the 2021 parliamentary elections for the 14th term.

On 27 November 2023, Attalides announced that she had joined the Volt Europa movement and the newly founded Volt Cyprus party. On 3 December 2023, she was elected co-chair of Volt together with Charilaos Velaris at the founding party conference of Volt.

She was a candidate for Volt in the Nicosia constituency in the May 2026 election, but failed to get re-elected.

== Other activities ==
She is a founding member of the organisation Friends of Akamas and was also a member of the Women Come Back movement.

== Personal life ==
Attalides is married and has a son.
