= Generation Change =

Political party in Cyprus

Generation Change Αλλαγή Γενιάς
- Leader: Anna Theologou
- Founder: Anna Theologou
- Founded: October 30, 2019
- Dissolved: March 15, 2024
- Merged into: Progressive Party of Working People
- Headquarters: Nicosia
- Ideology: Liberalism; Social liberalism
- Political position: Centre-left
- Colors: Purple; Yellow

Website
- anex.com.cy

The Generation Change (Greek: Αλλαγή Γενιάς, romanized: Allagi Genias) was a centre-left political party in Cyprus founded by Anna Theologou.

== History ==
The Generation Change was founded under the name "Independents" on October 30, 2019, as a political platform, with the participation of the independent MP Anna Theologou, who left the Citizens' Alliance in 2018.

Just before the 2021 legislative election, the "Independents" announced their cooperation with the Movement of United Cypriot Hunters in November 2020, with the participation of its executives on the ballot papers. However, the co-operation of the two parties ended in April 2021. In the election, they managed to win 2.82% of the popular vote, losing their one seat in the House of Representatives.

On January 27, 2024, it was officially announced that Anna Theologou will run in the 2024 European Elections as a candidate of the communist party AKEL. As a result, on March 15, 2024, her party was officially deleted from the Government Registry, after her request.

== Electoral results ==
=== Parliament ===
House of Representatives
Election	Votes			Seats	
Election	#	%	Rank	#	±
2021	10,095	2.82	9th	0 / 56	new
