= Makarios Drousiotis =

Greek journalist and politician

- Born: 10 January 1959 (age 67); Moniatis, Cyprus
- Citizenship: Cypriot
- Education: London College of Communication
- Occupations: Journalist, Author, Politician
- Notable work: Crime at Crans-Montana
- Political party: Volt Cyprus
- Website: makarios.eu

Makarios Drousiotis (Greek: Μακάριος Δρουσιώτης [maˈka.ri.os ðru.siˈo.tis]; born 10 January 1959) is a Greek Cypriot investigative journalist, author, and politician, known for his research and publications on the modern history of Cyprus.

== Career ==
Drousiotis has authored twelve books, focusing on various historical, political, and social issues within Cyprus, some of which have been translated into English, French, and Turkish. Throughout his career, he has contributed to several prominent newspapers in Cyprus and Greece, including Eleftherotipia, Phileleftheros, and Politis.

In the early 2010s, Drousiotis became actively involved in politics, initially working on the presidential campaign of Nicos Anastasiades and subsequently serving as his special advisor after Anastasiades' election. However, he resigned in October 2014 due to pressures related to his critical writings on the Soviet Union's role in the 1974 Turkish invasion of Cyprus, and later distanced himself from Anastasiades, criticizing his administration for corruption in his books. Following his resignation, Drousiotis moved to Brussels, where he worked as a personal assistant to Christos Stylianides, Cyprus' EU Commissioner, until 2019.

In recent years, he has been a vocal critic of corruption in Cyprus, a theme prevalent in his latest books, and in 2024, he ventured back into politics as a candidate for the European Parliament with the political party Volt Cyprus, emphasizing a need for transparency and the rule of law within the European Union.

His book "Mafia State" instigated a criminal investigation against former President Nikos Anastasiades, prompting the involvement of international legal practitioner Gabrielle Louise McIntyre.

On April 23, 2024, Anastasiades filed a lawsuit against Drousiotis, seeking over €2,000,000 in defamation damages and a ban on his books "Mafia State" and "The Gang", alleging malicious falsehoods.

He was honored with the Kutlu Adali Award in 2004, which is presented by the federation of workers in the Turkish Cypriot press. In 2005, he was awarded the International Press Freedom Award by the organization Reporters Without Borders.

In 2026, he stood as a candidate for Volt again in the Cypriot legislative election.

== Literary works ==
Books authored by Makarios Drousiotis in English
Date	Title
2008	The First Partition
2009	Cyprus 1974 - The Greek coup and the Turkish invasion
2016	The Cyprus Crisis and the Cold War
2023	Crime at Crans-Montana
2024	Putin's Island
