= List of political parties in Cyprus =

This article lists political parties in Cyprus. Cyprus has a multi-party system, with three or four strong parties who generally dominate the political landscape. No political parties registered in Northern Cyprus are known to be concurrently registered in the Republic of Cyprus and vice versa.

== List of political parties ==
=== Parliamentary parties ===
Name	Abbr.	Ideology	House	MEPs
Democratic Rally; Δημοκρατικός Συναγερμός	DISY; ΔΗΣΥ	Christian democracy; Liberal conservatism; Pro-Europeanism	17 / 56	2 / 6
Progressive Party of Working People; Ανορθωτικό Κόμμα Εργαζόμενου Λαού	AKEL; ΑΚΕΛ	Communism; Soft Euroscepticism	15 / 56	1 / 6
National Popular Front; Εθνικό Λαϊκό Μέτωπο	ELAM; ΕΛΑΜ	Ultranationalism; Neo-fascism	8 / 56	1 / 6
Democratic Party; Δημοκρατικό Κόμμα	DIKO; ΔΗΚΟ	—N/a	8 / 56	1 / 6
Direct Democracy Cyprus; Άμεση Δημοκρατία Κύπρου	ADK; ΆΔΚ	E-democracy; Direct democracy	4 / 56	1 / 6
ALMA – Citizens for Cyprus; ΑΛΜΑ – Πολίτες για την Κύπρο	ALMA; ΑΛΜΑ	Centrism; Reformism	4 / 56	0 / 6

=== Non-parliamentary parties and political organisations ===
(As listed in the Registry of Political Parties)

- EDEK Socialist Party (ΕΔΕΚ Σοσιαλιστικό Κόμμα)
- Active Citizens - Movement of Cypriot United Hunters (Ενεργοί πολίτες - Κίνημα Ενωμένων Κύπριων Κυνηγών)
- Democratic Front (Δημοκρατική Παράταξη)
- Volt Cyprus (Βολτ Κύπρος)
- Movement of Ecologists – Citizens' Cooperation (Κίνημα Οικολόγων – Συνεργασία Πολιτών)
- Democratic National Movement (Δημοκρατικό Εθνικό Κίνημα)
- Solidarity Movement (Κίνημα Αλληλεγγύη)
- Cyprus Social Ecology Movement (Κίνημα Κοινωνικής Οικολογίας Κύπρου)
- New Internationalist Left (Νέα Διεθνιστική Αριστερά)
- United Democrats (Ενωμένοι Δημοκράτες)
- Popular Socialist Movement (Λαϊκό Σοσιαλιστικό Κίνημα)
- Jasmine Movement (Κίνημα Γιασεμί)
- Workers' Democracy (Εργατική Δημοκρατία)
- Animal Party Cyprus (Κόμμα για τα Ζώα Κύπρου)
- United Republican Party of Cyprus (Ενωμένο Ρεπουμπλικανικό Κόμμα Κύπρου)
- Liberal Democrats (Φιλελεύθεροι Δημοκράτες)
- People's Breath (Πνοή Λαού)
- New Horizontal Power (Νέα Οριζόντια Δύναμη)
- Movement Justification Support Return (Κίνημα Δικαίωση Στήριξη Επιστροφή)
- Win (Νίκη)
- Patriotic Front (Πατριωτικό Μέτωπο)
- Act Movement (Κίνημα Ενεργώ)
- Free Citizens Strong Alliance (Ελεύθεροι Πολίτες Ισχυρή Συμμαχία)
- Far-left Resistance Communism (Ακρο-αριστερή Αντίσταση Κομμουνισμός)
- National Action Movement (Κίνημα Εθνική Δράσις).

=== Non-parliamentary parties that no longer exist ===
(As listed in the Registry of Political Parties)

- Democratic Front (DIPA) led by Spyros Kyprianou in 1976.
- Democratic National Party (DEK).
- New Democratic Front (NEDIPA) founded by Alecos Michaelides in 1980.
- Pancyprian Renewal Front (PAME) founded by Chrysostomos A. Sofianos in 1980.
- Union of the Center founded by Tassos Papadopoulos in 1980.
- The Liberal Party, founded by former Foreign Minister Nicos A. Rolandis in 1986 and merged with Democratic Rally in 1998.
- Fighting Democratic Movement, merged with DIKO in 2011.
- New Horizons, merged with European Democracy in 2005 and formed the European Party.
- European Democracy, merged with New Horizons in 2005 and formed the European Party.
- Committee for a Radical Left Rally (Επιτροπή για μια Ριζοσπαστική Αριστερή Συσπείρωση).
- European Party, merged with Solidarity Movement in 2016.
- Citizen's Alliance (Συμμαχία Πολιτών) founded by Giorgos Lilikas.
- Patriotic Coalition (Πατριωτικός Συνασπισμός), suspended its operation in June 2021.
- Famagusta for Cyprus (Αμμόχωστος για την Κύπρο ), merged with Volt Cyprus in October 2023.
- Awakening 2020 (Αφύπνιση 2020), merged with Active Citizens - Movement of Cypriot United Hunters.
- Movement of Independent Free Citizens (Κίνημα Ανεξάρτητων Ελεύθερων Πολιτών), suspended its operation in 2016.
- Citizen's Rights Office LASOK (Γραφείο Δικαιωμάτων Πολίτη ΛΑΣΟΚ), suspended its operation in 2016.
- Flag Social Movement (Κοινωνικό Κίνημα Σημαία), suspended its operation in 2017.
- Justice Movement (Κίνημα Δικαιοσύνης), suspended its operation in 2017.
- I, the Citizen (Εγώ ο Πολίτης), suspended its operation in 2021.
- Generation Change (Αλλαγή Γενιάς), suspended its operation in 2024.
- Organization of Justice Fighters (Οργάνωση Αγωνιστών Δικαιοσύνης), suspended its operation in 2025.

== See also ==
- List of political parties in Northern Cyprus
- Lists of political parties
