= Volt Cyprus =

Volt Cyprus Βολτ Κύπρος Volt Kıbrıs
- Abbreviation: Βολτ; Volt
- President: Lysia Demetriou; Pieros Karoullas
- General Secretary: Efi Xanthou
- Spokesperson: Frixos Vryonides
- Founded: 2021
- Registered: 3 December 2023; 2 years ago
- Ideology: Pro-Europeanism; European federalism United Cyprus; Progressivism
- European political alliance: Volt Europa
- Colours: Purple
- House of Representatives: 0 / 56
- European Parliament: 0 / 6
- Municipal Councils: 1 / 443

Website
- voltcyprus.org

Volt Cyprus (Greek: Βολτ Κύπρος, romanized: Volt Kýpros, Turkish: Volt Kıbrıs) is a political party in Cyprus and the Cyprus branch of Volt Europa, a federalist and progressive European political alliance, which advocates for greater European cooperation across Europe.

== History ==
Volt became active in Cyprus with a close cooperation with the movement New Wave - The Other Cyprus with the signing of a Memorandum of Understanding on 4 November 2021. In it, the movements agreed to cooperate more closely and merge after the 2023 presidential election and New Wave - The Other Cyprus renamed itself into Neo Kyma || Volt Cyprus - The Other Cyprus. With their candidate Constantinos Christofides they received 1.6% of the vote in the first round of the election.

On 26 October 2023, Volt, New Wave and the Famagusta for Cyprus movement announced their merger and the formation of Volt Cyprus as a party. On 27 November, Member of Parliament Alexandra Attalides, of the Ecologists at the time, announced that she would become a member of Volt. On 3 December, the party adopted its statutes at its founding party conference and elected Alexandra Attalides and Charilaos Velaris as chairpersons. Hulusi Kilim, a Turkish Cypriot, was elected Secretary General, making him the first Turkish Cypriot politician to hold the highest office in a party that is active in the Republic of Cyprus and Volt the only party that currently unites both the Greek Cypriot and Turkish Cypriot communities under one roof.

== Policies ==
As part of the pan-European movement Volt Europa, the party aims to solve current challenges and issues such as climate change, migration and artificial intelligence through closer European cooperation.

=== Cyprus conflict ===
Volt is in favour of a united Cyprus. To resolve the Cyprus conflict, the party is in favour of reopening communication channels between the different parts of the country in order to close the communication gap created by closed checkpoints. To this end, it proposes, among other things, to abolish obstacles such as double insurance for cars and charges for telephone calls between the different parts of the country. Intra-Cypriot trade is to be strengthened in order to create mutual dependencies. The ceasefire regime should be strengthened through a peace agreement and common Cypriot interests should be placed more at the center.

=== European policy ===
The party aims to establish a federal united Europe with a common European army, a European government with a European prime minister, and a European ministry of finance and economy to better respond to global challenges.

== Organisation ==
The party is led by a dual leadership consisting of a man and a woman.

== Election ==
=== European Parliament 2024 ===
Volt's programme for the European elections was adopted on 27 November at the Volt Europa General Assembly in Paris and applies equally to Volt throughout Europe. On 25 February, the party elected its 6 candidates: Sophia Vassiliou, Lysia Demetriou, Makarios Drousiotis, Hulusi Kilim, Nikolas Kyriacou and Andromache Sophocleous. The list includes the investigative journalist Makarios Drousiotis.

=== National elections 2026 ===
Volt participated in the legislative election 2026 with 56 candidates. The party received 11,487 votes (3.09%) but did not secure any seats in the House of Representatives. Consequently, the party lost its parliamentary representation, previously held by Alexandra Attalides.

== Election results ==
=== Parliament ===
House of Representatives
Election	Votes			Seats	
Election	#	%	Rank	#	±
2026	11,487	3.09	10th	0 / 56	new

=== European Parliament ===
European Parliament
Election	Votes			Seats	
Election	#	%	Rank	#	±
2024	10,777	2.92	7th	0 / 6	new
