= 2021 Cypriot legislative election =

- 30 May 2021

56 of 80 seats in the House of Representatives
- Turnout: 65.72% (▼1.02 pp)
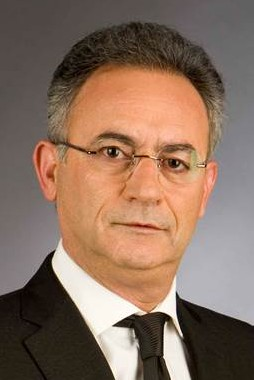

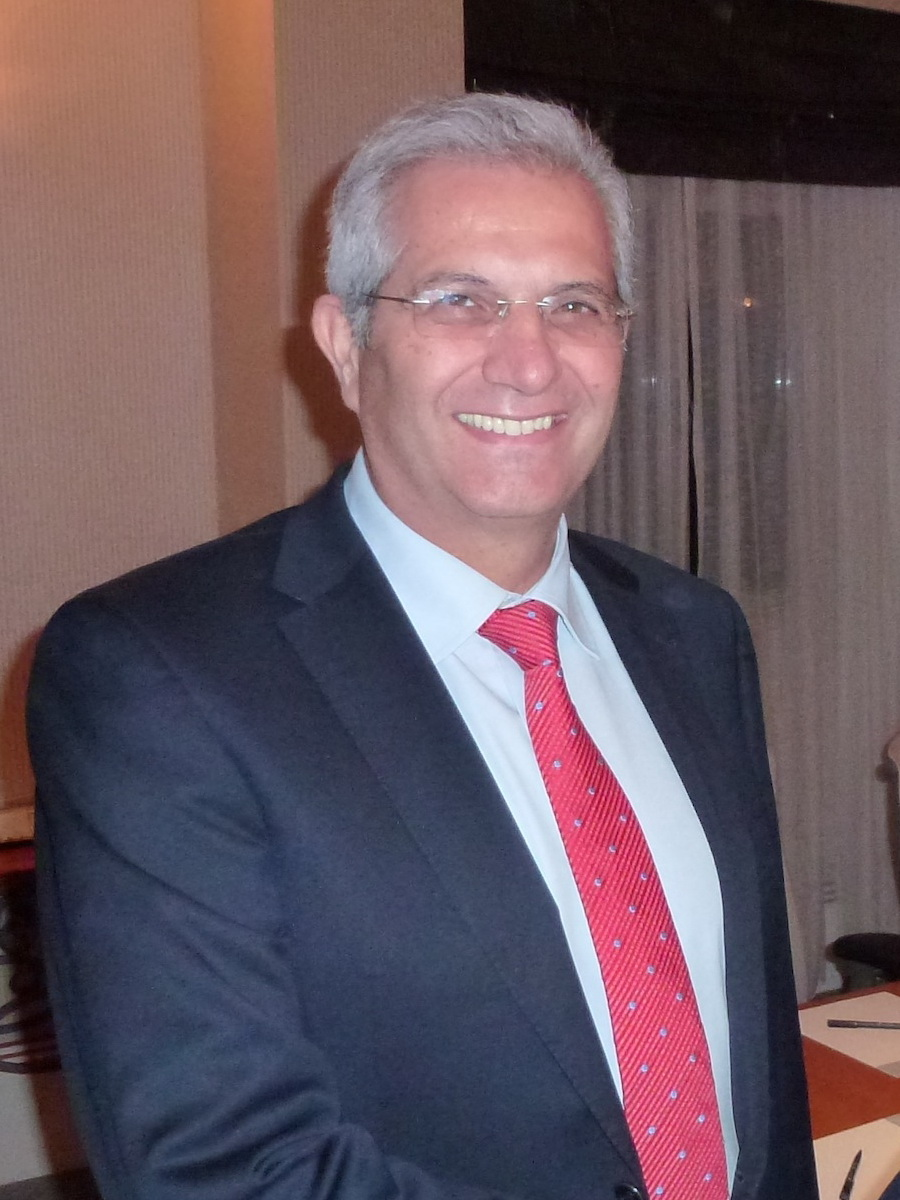

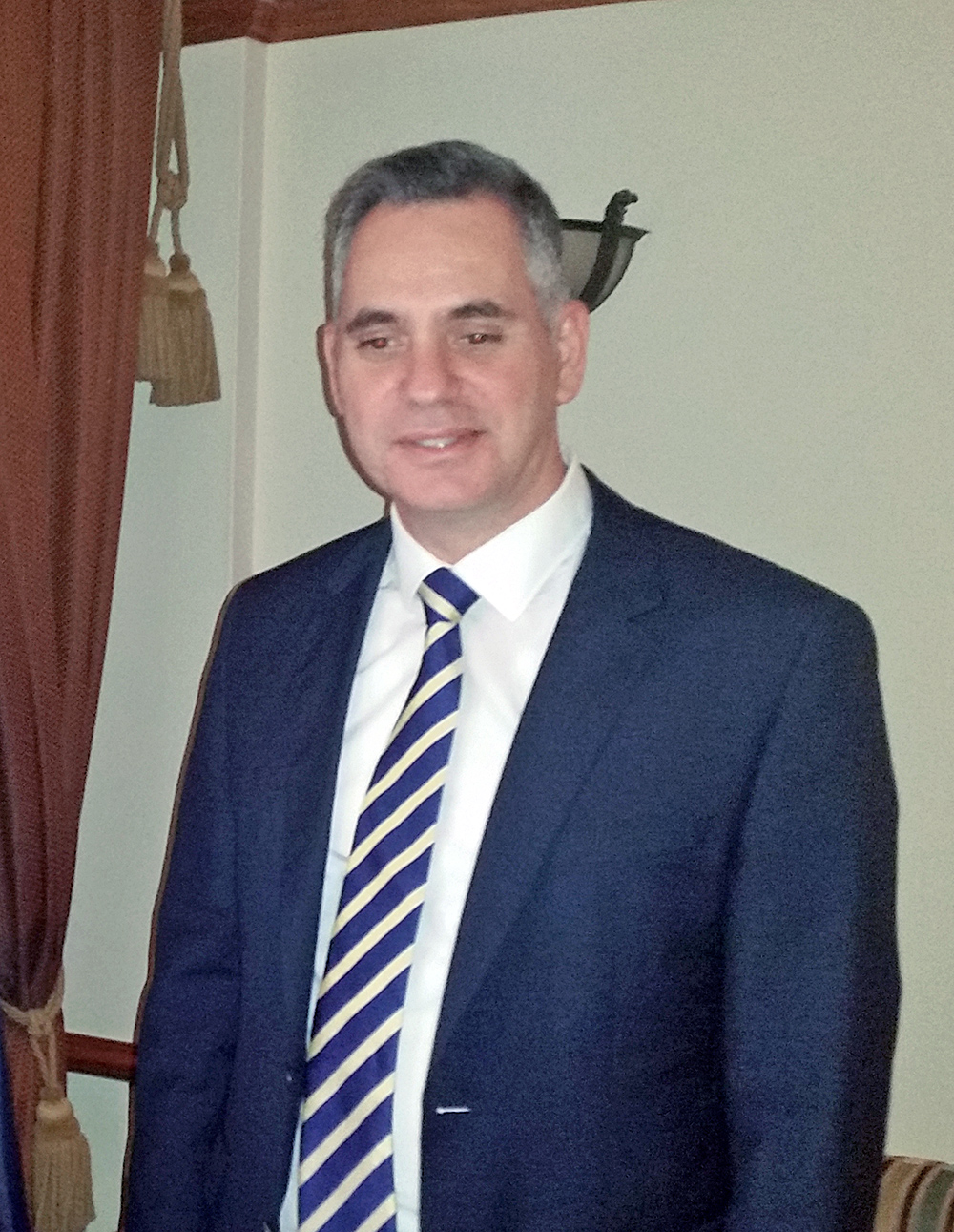

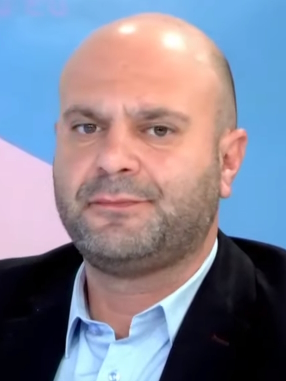

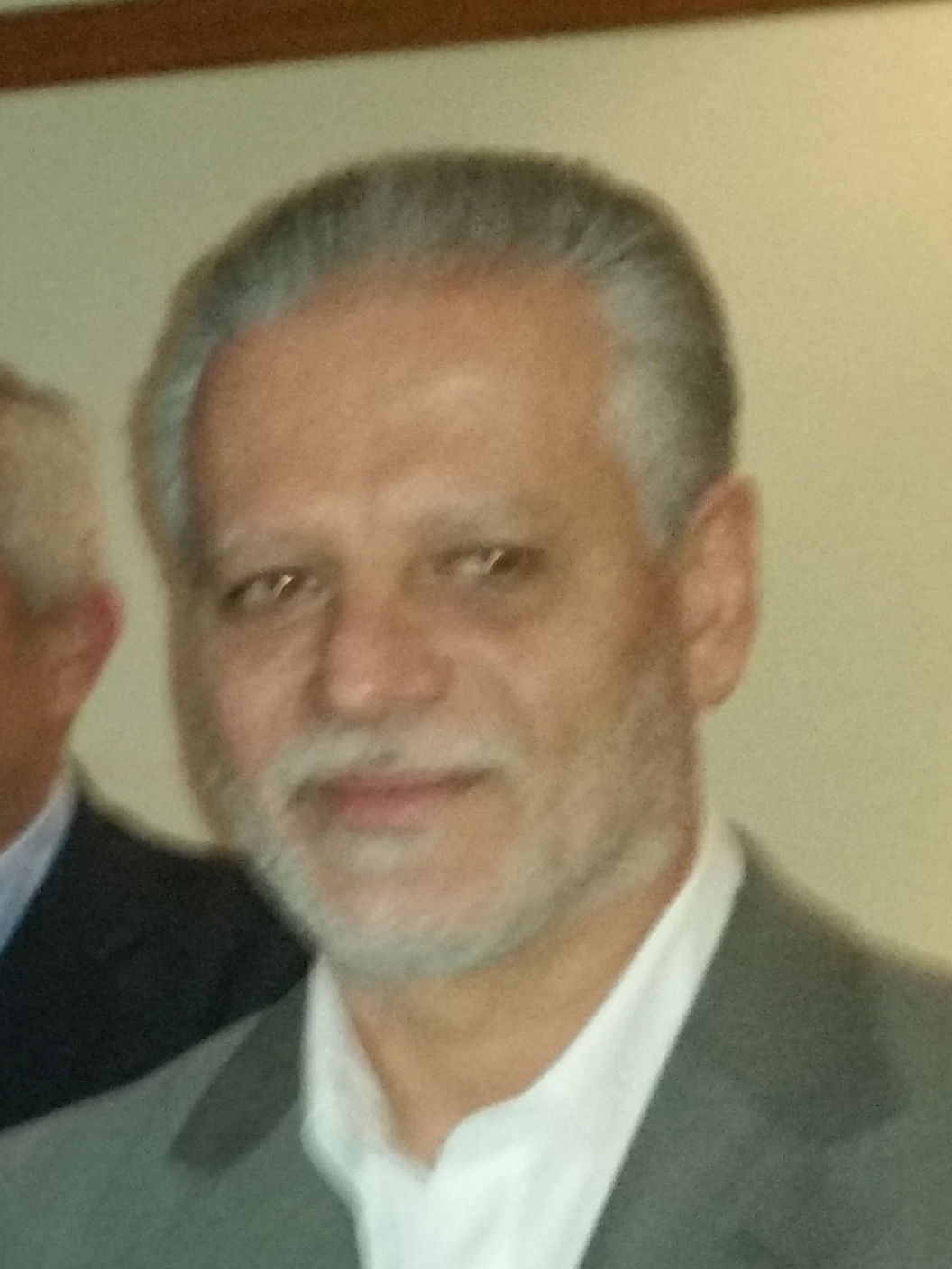

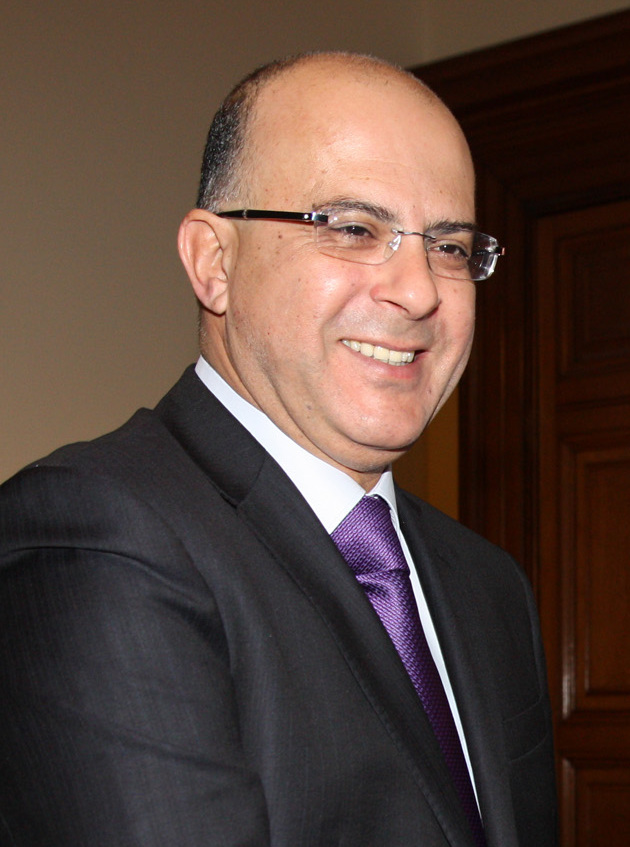
	First party	Second party	Third party
Leader	Averof Neophytou	Andros Kyprianou	Nikolas Papadopoulos
Party	DISY	AKEL	DIKO
Last election	30.69%, 18 seats	25.67%, 16 seats	14.49%, 9 seats
Seats won	17	15	9
Seat change	▼1	▼1	Steady
Popular vote	99,328	79,913	40,395
Percentage	27.77%	22.34%	11.29%
Swing	▼2.92pp	▼3.33pp	▼3.20pp
	Fourth party	Fifth party	Sixth party
Leader	Christos Christou	Marinos Sizopoulos	Marios Garoyian
Party	ELAM	EDEK–SYPOL	DIPA
Last election	3.71%, 3 seats	EDEK: 6.18%, 3 seats SYPOL: 6.01%, 3 seats	Did not exist
Seats won	4	4	4
Seat change	▲2	▼2	New party
Popular vote	24,255	24,022	21,832
Percentage	6.78%	6.72%	6.10%
Swing	▲3.07pp	▼5.44pp	New party
	Seventh party
	KOSP
Leader	Charalambos Theopemptou
Party	KOSP
Last election	4.81%, 2 seat
Seats won	3
Seat change	▲1
Popular vote	15,762
Percentage	4.41%
Swing	▼0.40pp
- Constituency results
President of the House of Representatives before election
Adamos Adamou
AKEL
Elected President of the House of Representatives
Annita Demetriou
DISY

Parliamentary elections were held in Cyprus on 30 May 2021 to elect 56 of the 80 Members of the House of Representatives.

== Electoral system ==
The 80 members of the House of Representatives are elected from six multi-member constituencies, with the number of seats allocated according to the population of each area. Of the 80, 56 are elected by Greek Cypriots and 24 by Turkish Cypriots. However, since 1964, the Turkish Cypriot seats are unfilled and the House of Representatives has de facto had 56 seats since its enlargement in the 1980s. Each constituency corresponds to the six districts of Cyprus.

The elections are held using open list proportional representation; voters vote for a party and can then cast one preferential vote for a candidate on their party's list for every four seats available in their constituency (party leaders or other candidates heading coalitions are not required to receive preferential votes to be elected). Seats are allocated using the Hare quota, with any remaining seats allocated to lists that won at least one seat or parties that received at least 3.6% of the vote. The current seat allocation for the 2021 election was as follows:

Districts	Seats
Nicosia	20
Limassol	12
Famagusta	11
Larnaca	6
Paphos	4
Kyrenia	3
Total	56

== Parties ==
Party	Ideology	Leader
Democratic Rally (DISY)	Liberal conservatism	Averof Neophytou
Progressive Party of Working People (AKEL)	Communism, Marxism-Leninism, Cypriotism	Andros Kyprianou
Democratic Party (DIKO)	Greek Cypriot nationalism, Centrism	Nikolas Papadopoulos
Movement for Social Democracy (EDEK)	Greek Cypriot nationalism, Social democracy	Marinos Sizopoulos
Movement of Ecologists - Citizens' Cooperation (KOSP)	Green politics, Social democracy	Charalambos Theopemptou
National Popular Front (ELAM)	Ultranationalism	Christos Christou
Citizens' Alliance (SYPOL)	Populism, Social democracy	Giorgos Lillikas
Solidarity Movement (KA)	National conservatism, Euroscepticism	Eleni Theocharous
Democratic Front (DIPA)	Centrism	Marios Garoyian
Generation Change (GA)	Social liberalism, Centrism	Anna Theologou

== Opinion polls ==
Date	Polling Firm	DISY	AKEL	DIKO	EDEK	SYPOL	KA	KOSP	ELAM	DIPA	GA	Others	Lead
14–20 May 2021	Symmetron	26.3	24.9	12.4	6.2		2.1	6.2	6.7	4.9	3.2	7.2 (Note: Famagusta for Cyprus 2.1%, Hunters’ Party 1.5%, Animal Party Cyprus 1.5%)	1.4
5–15 May 2021	IMR/UNic	21.0	19.0	9.5	5.5		1.5	5.5	5.5	3.0	2.5	6.5 (Note: Hunters’ Party 1.5%)	2.0
10–14 May 2021	Prime	25.7	23.4	13.0	5.7		1.5	5.4	6.8	3.5	3.4	11.5	2.3
5–13 May 2021	Noverna	26.1	24.8	10.7	5.8		1.4	7.0	8.5	4.3	4.4	7.0 (Note: Animal Party Cyprus 1.8%, Hunters’ Party 2.1%, Famagusta for Cyprus 0.9%, People's Breath 0.5%)	1.3
6–12 May 2021	Prime	18.8	17.3	9.5	4.2		1.8	4.6	4.9	2.8	2.5	7.2 (Note: Hunters’ Party 2.2%)	1.5
4–12 May 2021	CYMAR	26.9	22.9	14.3	6.0		1.7	7.1	6.2	2.7	3.5	8.7 (Note: Famagusta for Cyprus 2.7%, Hunters’ Party 2.0%, Animal Party Cyprus 1.4%, A2020 0.4%, People's Breath 0.3%)	4.0
4–7 May 2021	Pulse	25.0	23.0	12.0	6.0		3.0	7.0	7.0	3.5	3.5	9.0 (Note: Famagusta for Cyprus 2.0%, Hunters’ Party 2.0%, A2020 1.5%)	2.0
7-23 Apr 2021	Noverna	28.4	26.9	12.9	6.1		0.9	6.5	6.5	3.1	3.4	5.3 (Note: Animal Party Cyprus 1.2%, Famagusta for Cyprus 0.9%, People's Breath 1.4%)	1.5
13-17 Apr 2021	Cypronetwork	25.8	22.7	14.0	6.8		2.9	7.6	6.2	2.5	6.5	5.0 (Note: Animal Party Cyprus 1.5%, Famagusta for Cyprus 1.0%)	3.1
12-16 Apr 2021	Prime	26.3	24.0	13.3	5.1		1.8	6.1	6.6	3.4	4.6	7.8 (Note: Animal Party Cyprus 1.8%, Famagusta for Cyprus 1.6%, A2020 1.6%)	2.3
31 Mar-16 Apr 2021	IMR/UNic	27.2	24.5	13.6	6.8		1.4	6.8	6.1	4.1	5.4	4.1	2.7
2-9 Apr 2021	Symmetron	26.4	23.9	14.5	5.8		1.5	7.4	5.8	4.1	5.8	4.8 (Note: Animal Party Cyprus 1.5%, Famagusta for Cyprus 1.3%)	2.5
26 Mar-9 Apr 2021	CYMAR	28.1	24.6	12.0	4.8		0.7	6.5	8.5	2.6	5.4	6.8 (Note: Animal Party Cyprus 1.0%, Famagusta for Cyprus 1.2%, A2020 0.6%, People's Breath 0.4%)	3.5
9 Mar - 4 Apr 2021	Cypronetwork	26.9	22.1	14.1	6.1		0.6	6.1	6.2	2.2	8.3	7.4 (Note: People's Breath 0.5%)	4.8
8-20 Mar 2021	IMR/UNic	26.0	23.3	14.4	5.5		2.1	8.2	6.2	4.1	6.8	3.4	2.7
8-18 Mar 2021	Pulse	25.8	21.2	13.6	6.1		1.5	9.1	4.5	3.0	4.5	10.7	4.8
8-12 Mar 2021	Prime	23.9	21.3	11.9	4.8	-	1.9	6.1	5.8	3.0	1.9	10.4	2.6
25 Feb - 2 Mar 2021	GPO	28.1	26.3	13.8	4.8		1.6	8.4	9.2	3.4	3.4	2.6	2.3
12-19 Feb 2021	Symmetron	26.9	22.0	14.2	5.5		2.0	7.7	5.7	3.9	3.0	2.6 (Note: Animal Party Cyprus 2.0%)	4.9
1-6 Feb 2021	Prime	28.4	24.5	13.5	5.4		0.9	7.0	6.7	2.8	3.3	7.5	3.9
20-25 Jan 2021	Interview	30.0	20.5	12.0	4.8		4.8	4.0	4.8	4.3	-	14.8	9.5
16-23 Oct 2020	Prime	30.5	26.1	13.2	6.2	-	1.8	6.0	6.2	2.5	-	7.5	4.4
26 May 2019	EP election 2019	29.0	27.5	13.8	10.6	3.3	-	with SYPOL	8.3	3.8	-	5.7	1.5
22 May 2016	Election 2016	30.7	25.7	14.5	6.2	6.0	5.2	4.8	3.7	-	-	1.1	5.0

== Campaign ==
Anti-government demonstrations have been taking place that resulted in clashes with the police.

Despite the COVID-19 pandemic in Cyprus, the campaign and voting process is not expected to be significantly altered.

== Results ==
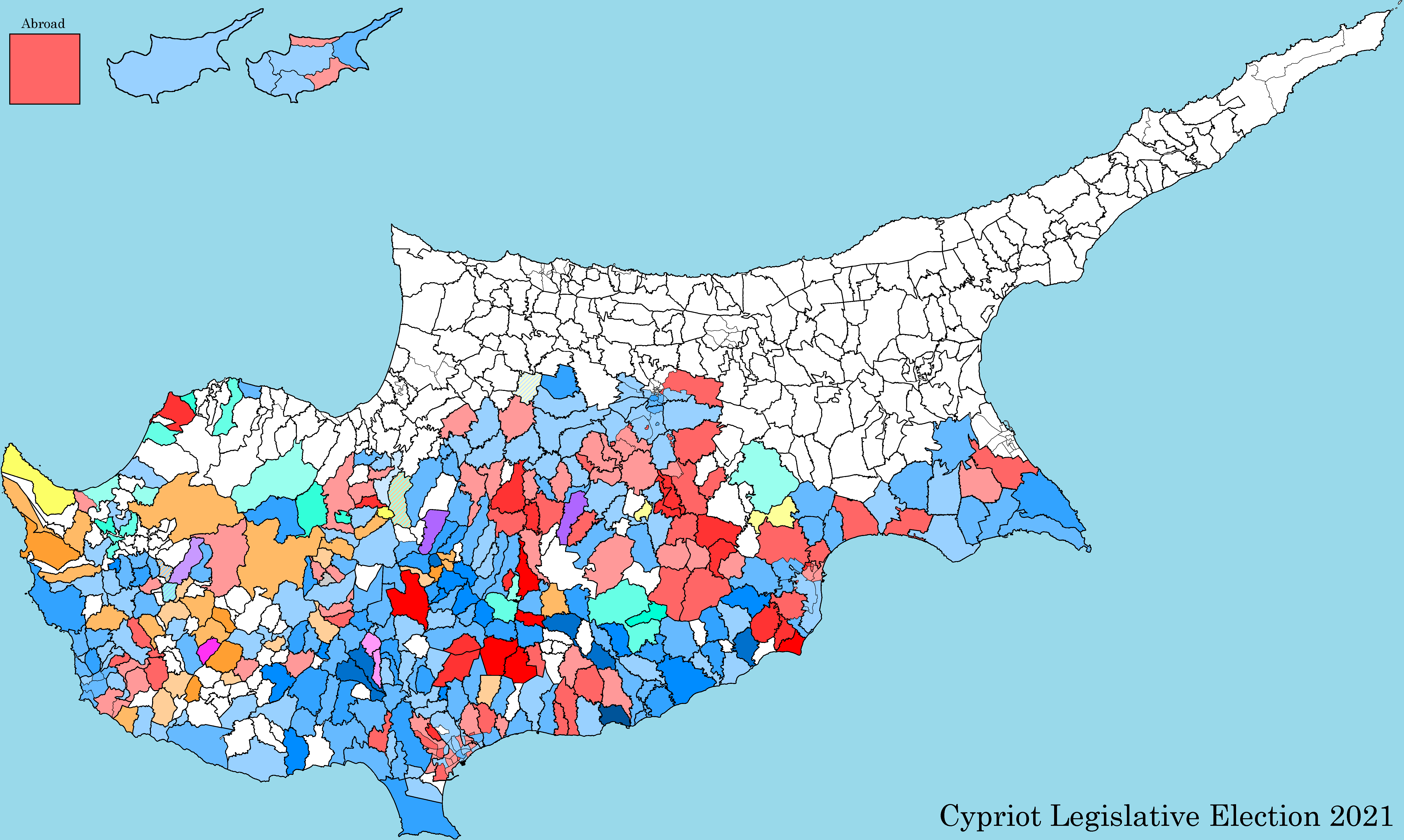
Results by locality

Party	Votes	%	Seats	+/–
Democratic Rally	99,328	27.77	17	–1
Progressive Party of Working People	79,913	22.34	15	–1
Democratic Party	40,395	11.29	9	0
National Popular Front	24,255	6.78	4	+2
Movement for Social Democracy–Citizens' Alliance	24,022	6.72	4	–2
Democratic Front	21,832	6.10	4	New
Movement of Ecologists – Citizens' Cooperation	15,762	4.41	3	+1
Active Citizens – Movement of Cypriot United Hunters	11,712	3.27	0	New
Generation Change	10,095	2.82	0	New
Solidarity Movement	8,254	2.31	0	–3
Famagusta for Cyprus	5,596	1.56	0	New
Awakening 2020	4,839	1.35	0	New
People's Breath	4,585	1.28	0	0
Animal Party Cyprus	3,593	1.00	0	0
Patriotic Coalition	376	0.11	0	New
Independents	3,155	0.88	0	0
Total	357,712	100.00	56	0
Valid votes	357,712	97.57		
Invalid votes	6,826	1.86		
Blank votes	2,070	0.56		
Total votes	366,608	100.00		
Registered voters/turnout	557,836	65.72		
Source: Ministry of Interior

=== Distribution by constituency ===
Constituency	DISY		AKEL		DIKO		ELAM		EDEK		DIPA		KOSP	
Constituency	%	S	%	S	%	S	%	S	%	S	%	S	%	S
Nicosia	25.5	5	21.1	6	11.0	3	6.1	1	7.4	1	6.7	2	6.9	2
Limassol	28.6	3	22.1	3	13.3	2	6.5	1	4.8	1	6.4	1	3.3	1
Famagusta	31.5	4	24.4	3	6.7	2	7.7	1	4.0	0	4.9	1	2.8	0
Larnaca	26.1	2	26.3	1	9.7	1	7.7	1	8.7	1	7.0	0	2.2	0
Paphos	29.9	1	17.2	1	18.5	1	7.3	0	13.3	1	3.7	0	3.6	0
Kyrenia	24.3	2	24.5	1	15.0	0	5.5	0	5.2	0	7.9	0	5.0	0
Total	27.8	17	22.3	15	11.3	9	6.8	4	6.7	4	6.1	4	4.4	3
Source.
