= Niyazi Kızılyürek =

Turkish Cypriot political scientist and politician

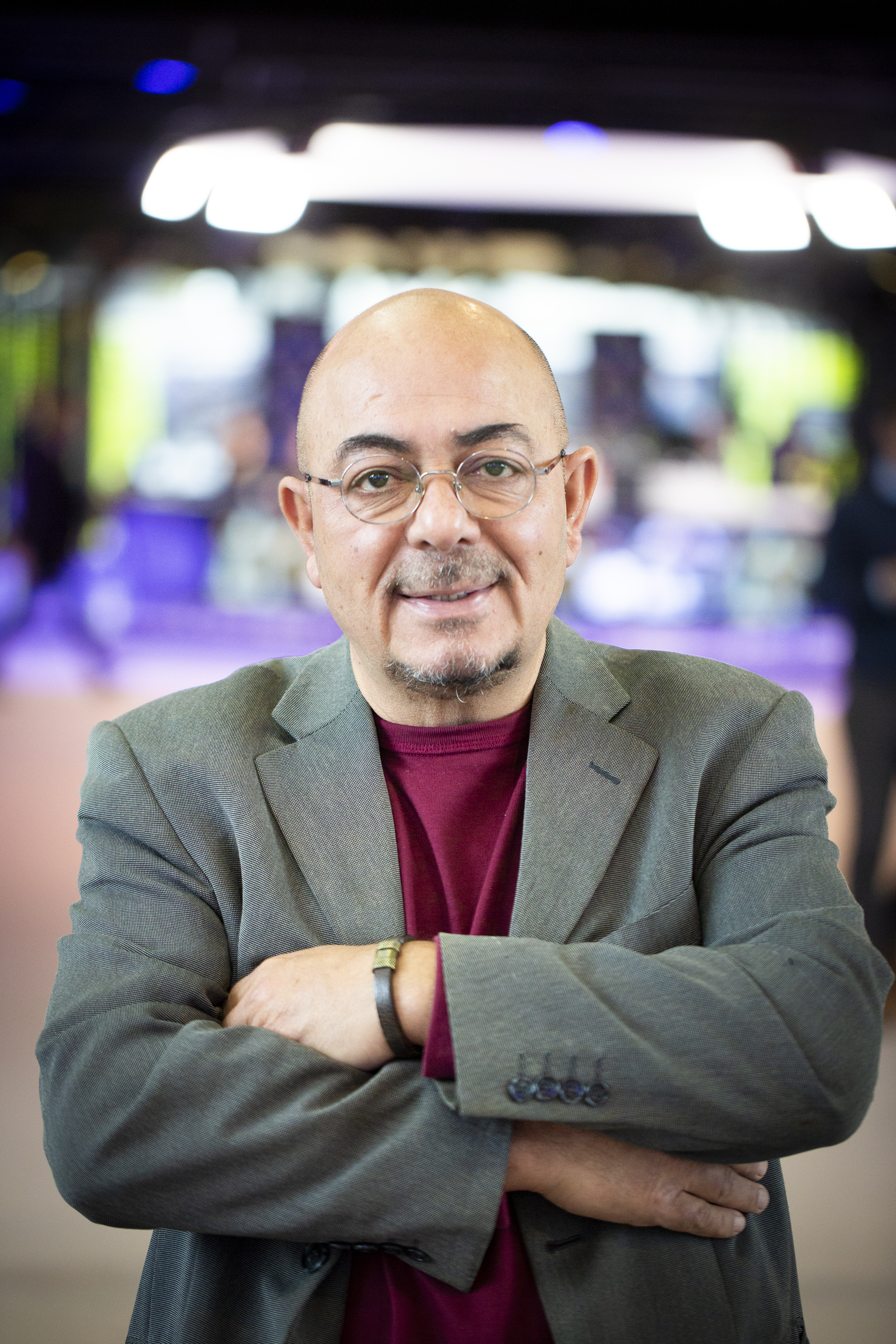

Member of the European Parliament for Cyprus
- In office 2 July 2019 – 16 July 2024

Personal details
- Born: 19 February 1959 (age 67) Potamia, Nicosia, Cyprus
- Party: Cyprus: AKEL (European Union) EU: GUE-NGL
- Education: University of Bremen (BA) (MA) (PhD)

Niyazi Kızılyürek (born 19 February 1959) is a Turkish Cypriot political scientist and politician. He is, as of 2016, a professor of political history in the University of Cyprus, specialising on the political history of Turkey and Cyprus, and the Dean of the School of Humanities there.

== Biography ==
Niyazi Kızılyürek born in Potamia, fled to Louroujina along with his family due to the intercommunal violence of 1964. After completing high school in Northern Cyprus, he went to University of Bremen, where he graduated with a BA and MA in Sociology, Politics and Economics in 1983. He completed his PhD at the same university, with a thesis on the Cyprus problem.

He produced a documentary called Our Wall with Panicos Chrysanthou, later winning the Abdi İpekçi Peace Award for the documentary in 1997. In 1995, he entered the University of Cyprus as a lecturer. Upon his entry, he was targeted by fascists, nationalist politicians and media, facing a year-long campaign for his expulsion from the university. He resisted with the support of his co-workers and the university and remained there. He related that over the years, the working environment became much less hostile. In 2013, he was elected Dean of the School of Humanities. In 2014, Kızılyürek became one of the advisers of President Nicos Anastasiades on Turkey in the Geostrategic Advisory Council.

Kızılyürek has authored around 20 books, including Glafcos Clerides: The Path of a Country. He is a columnist in the Turkish Cypriot left-wing newspaper Yeni Düzen and the right-wing Greek Cypriot newspaper Simerini. He has command of five languages: Turkish, Greek, English, German and French.

== Politics ==
Kızılyürek entered politics in 2019, as a candidate for the 2019 European Parliament election with the left-wing Progressive Party of Working People (AKEL). His candidacy has proved controversial; Averof Neofytou and Eleni Stavrou of the centre-right Democratic Rally claimed that it only serves to reward Turkish intransigence and to normalize the presence of the occupying Turkish Army in Cyprus.

He was elected to the European Parliament with 25,051 votes, coming second among AKEL's candidates, behind Giorgos Georgiou. His election led to renewed controversy because he said that he will promote the Turkish language as an official language of the European Parliament (because it is an official language of the Republic of Cyprus). On the other hand, his supporters have repeatedly praised Kızılyürek's positions about a peaceful reunification of Cyprus and his explicit condemnation of the Turkish invasion and military occupation, as well as the ethnic cleansing and theft of property committed against Greek Cypriots since 1974.

He ran for reelection in 2024 but lost because AKEL's vote share wasn't enough to win the second seat.

== Books ==
- Glafkos Clerides: The Path of a Country, Rimal Publications, Nicosia, 2008, 278 p. ISBN 9789963610341
