= Animal Party Cyprus =

Animal Party Cyprus Κόμμα για τα Ζώα Κύπρου Kıbrıs Hayvan Partisi
- Abbreviation: APC
- President: Kyriakos Kyriakou
- Founder: Kyriakos Kyriakou
- Founded: 27 April 2014; 12 years ago
- Headquarters: Limassol, Cyprus
- Ideology: Animal rights; Animal welfare
- Political position: Single-issue
- European political alliance: Animal Politics EU
- Colours: Orange; Blue
- House of Representatives: 0 / 56
- European Parliament: 0 / 6

Website
- animalpartycyprus.com

The Animal Party Cyprus (APC, Greek: Κόμμα για τα Ζώα Κύπρου, Turkish: Kıbrıs Hayvan Partisi) is a political party in Cyprus advocating for animal rights and welfare. It was founded on 27 April 2014, and is led by Kyriakos Kyriakou.

The party is one of the seven founding members of the European group Animal Politics EU, which is affiliated with The Left in the European Parliament. APC is a "hardcore" (single-issue) party and as such forms a core of the group.

== Election results ==
=== Parliament ===
House of Representatives
| Election | Votes | | | Seats | |
| Election | # | % | Rank | # | ± |
|---|---|---|---|---|---|
| 2016 | 4,088 | 1.16 | 9th | 0 / 56 | new |
| 2021 | 3,593 | 1.00 | 14th | 0 / 56 | 0 |

=== European Parliament ===
European Parliament
| Election | Votes | | | Seats | |
| Election | # | % | Rank | # | ± |
|---|---|---|---|---|---|
| 2014 | 2,288 | 0.88 | 8th | 0 / 6 | new |
| 2019 | 2,208 | 0.79 | 9th | 0 / 6 | 0 |
| 2024 | 1,013 | 0.27 | 11th | 0 / 6 | 0 |

== Sources ==
- Morini, Marco (2018-08-08). "'Animals first!' The rise of animal advocacy parties in the EU: a new party family". Contemporary Politics. 24 (4): 418–435. doi:10.1080/13569775.2018.1434450. ISSN 1356-9775.
