= Michalis Hatzipantelas =

Cypriot health minister from 2021 to 2023

Michalis Hatzipantelas MEP
- Μιχάλης Χατζηπαντέλα
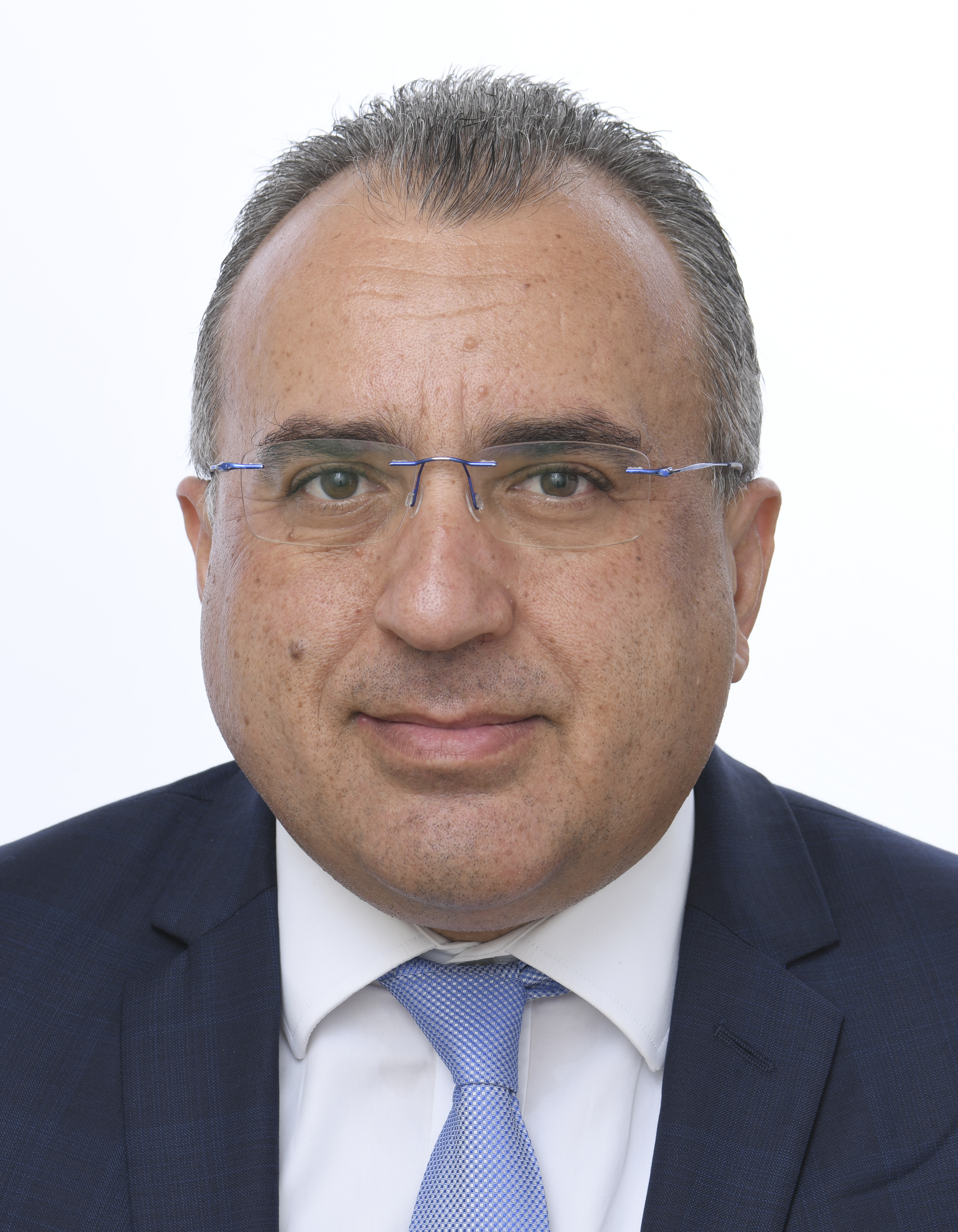
- Official portrait, 2024

Minister of Health
- In office 2 July 2021 – 28 February 2023
- Preceded by: Constantinos Ioannou
- Succeeded by: Popi Kanari

Member of the European Parliament
- Constituency: Cyprus

Personal details
- Born: June 12, 1974 (age 52) Peristeronopigi, Cyprus
- Party: Democratic Rally
- Education: University of West London; Queen Mary University of London
- Profession: Chartered Accountant

Michalis Hatzipantelas (born June 12, 1974) is a Greek Cypriot politician who served as the Health Minister of Cyprus in the government of Nicos Anastasiades. In the election of June 9, 2024, he was elected as an MEP for Cyprus with the centre-right party DISY.

== Early life and education ==
Hatzipantelas was born on June 12, 1974, in the village of Peristeronopigi, Famagusta, Cyprus. He graduated from the University of West London and Queen Mary University of London, obtaining degrees including FCA, AIA, MSc (Econ), and BA (Hons).

== Career ==
Hatzipantelas is a chartered accountant. He is the founder of HMI & Partners Ltd, and is a member of the Institute of Chartered Accountants in England and Wales (ICAEW).

He served as the president of Anorthosis Famagusta FC from April 2019 to October 2020.

Hatzipantelas served as a member of the Committee of the Audit Service of Cooperative Societies and as vice-chairman of the board of directors of the Cyprus Electricity Authority.

He serves as an accounting professor at European University, in Nicosia.

On July 2, 2021, he was appointed as the Health Minister of Cyprus by the president, Nicos Anastasiades, during the COVID-19 pandemic. He held this position until the end of Anastasiades' term.

On February 10, 2024, it was announced that Hatzipantelas would be one of the six candidates representing the Democratic Rally in the 9 June European Parliament Election, after finishing first in the party's internal election. He was successfully elected as an MEP.
