= Democratic Alignment (Cyprus) =

Democratic Alignment Δημοκρατική Παράταξη
- Abbreviation: DiPa
- Leader: Marios Garoyian
- Founded: 20 April 2018; 8 years ago
- Split from: DIKO
- Headquarters: Nicosia, Cyprus
- Youth wing: NEO DIPA (Youth Democratic Alignment)
- Ideology: Liberalism
- Political position: Centre
- European affiliation: Alliance of Liberals and Democrats for Europe
- European Parliament group: Renew Europe
- Colours: Blue, Orange
- House of Representatives: 0 / 56
- European Parliament: 0 / 6
- Municipal Councils: 19 / 443

Website
- depa.cy

Democratic Alignment (Greek: Δημοκρατική Παράταξη, Dimokratiki Parataxi) is a centrist political party in Cyprus.

The party was created after disagreements with Democratic Party (DIKO) leader Nikolas Papadopoulos with regard to the approach the Greek Cypriot administration should take with regard to working to solve the Cyprus problem. The party was admitted into the Alliance of Liberals and Democrats for Europe (ALDE) on 18 November 2020 and it is a member of the Renew Europe European parliament group. Following the 2026 legislative election, the party lost all its seats in the House of Representatives.

== Electoral results ==
=== Parliament ===
House of Representatives
Election	Votes			Seats	
Election	#	%	Rank	#	±
2021	21,832	6.10	6th	4 / 56	new
2026	11,693	3.14	9th	0 / 56	▼4

=== European Parliament ===
European Parliament
Election	Votes			Seats	
Election	#	%	Rank	#	±
2019	10,673	3.80	6th	0 / 6	new
2024	7,988	2.17	8th	0 / 6	Steady
