= 2019 European Parliament election in Cyprus =

- 26 May 2019

6 Cypriot seats in the European Parliament
- Opinion polls
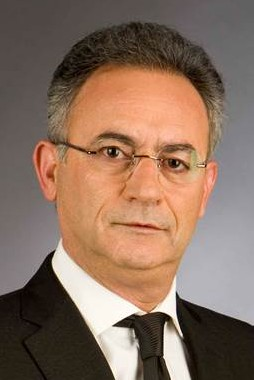

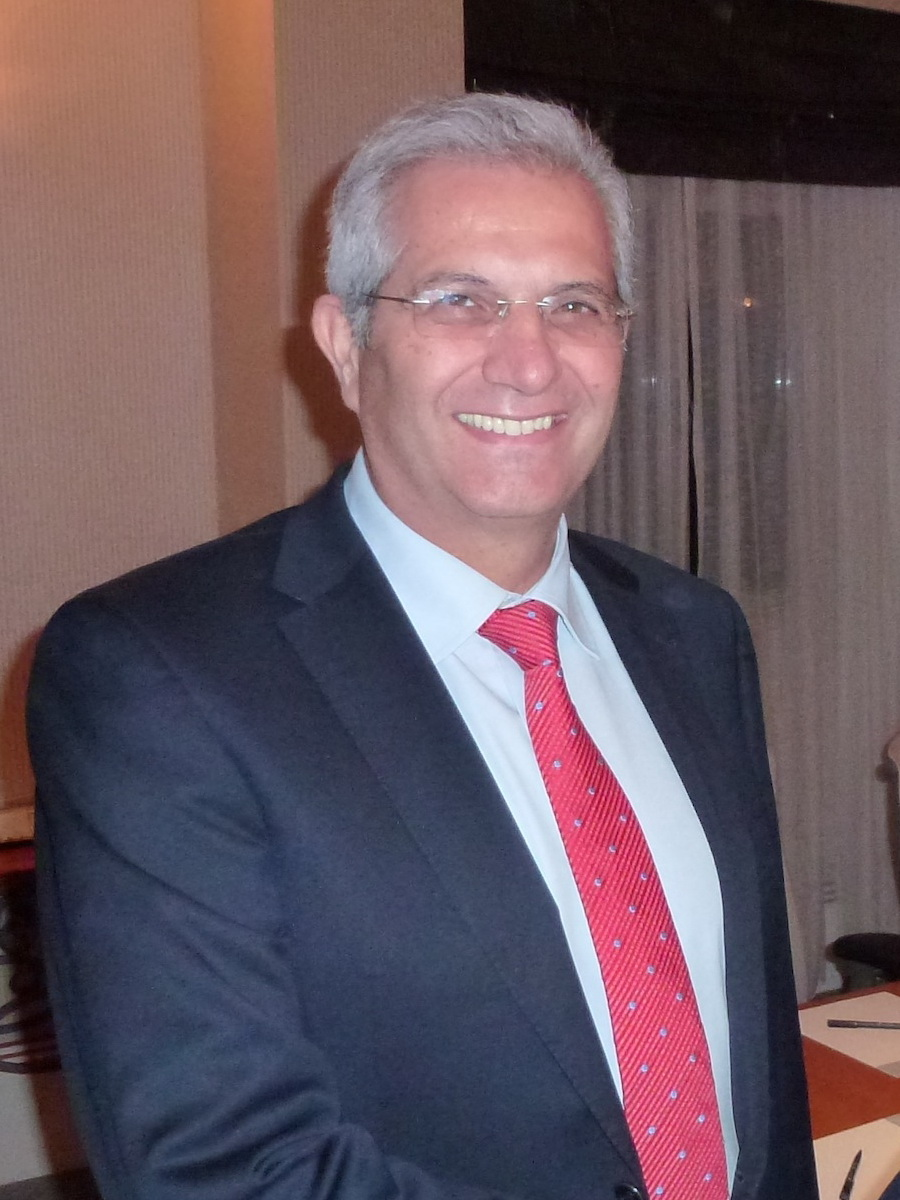

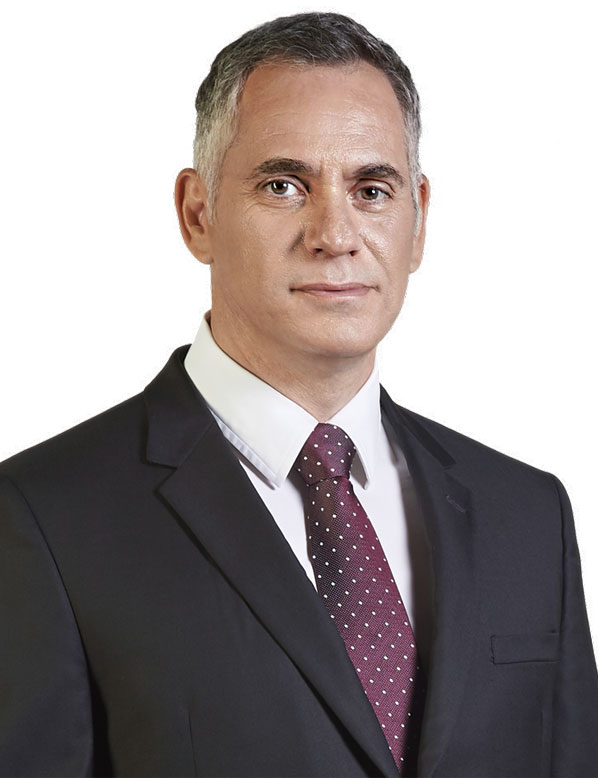

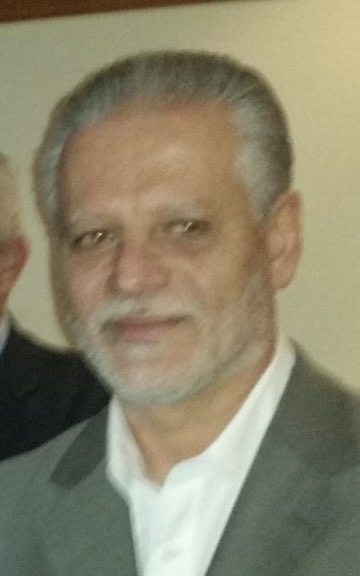
| | First party | Second party |
|---|---|---|
| Leader | Averof Neofytou | Andros Kyprianou |
| Party | DISY | AKEL |
| Alliance | EPP | The Left |
| Leader since | 11 May 2013 | 21 January 2009 |
| Last election | 2 seats, 35.65% | 2 seats, 26.98% |
| Seats before | 2 | 2 |
| Seats won | 2 | 2 |
| Seat change | Steady | Steady |
| Popular vote | 81,539 | 77,241 |
| Percentage | 29.02% | 27.49% |
| Swing | ▼8.73 | ▲0.51 |
| | Third party | Fourth party |
| Leader | Nikolas Papadopoulos | Marinos Sizopoulos |
| Party | DIKO | EDEK |
| Alliance | S&D | S&D |
| Leader since | 1 December 2013 | 1 March 2015 |
| Last election | 1 seat, 10.83% | 1 seat, 7.68% |
| Seats before | 1 | 1 |
| Seats won | 1 | 1 |
| Seat change | Steady | Steady |
| Popular vote | 38,756 | 29,715 |
| Percentage | 13.80% | 10.58% |
| Swing | ▲2.97 | ▲2.9 |
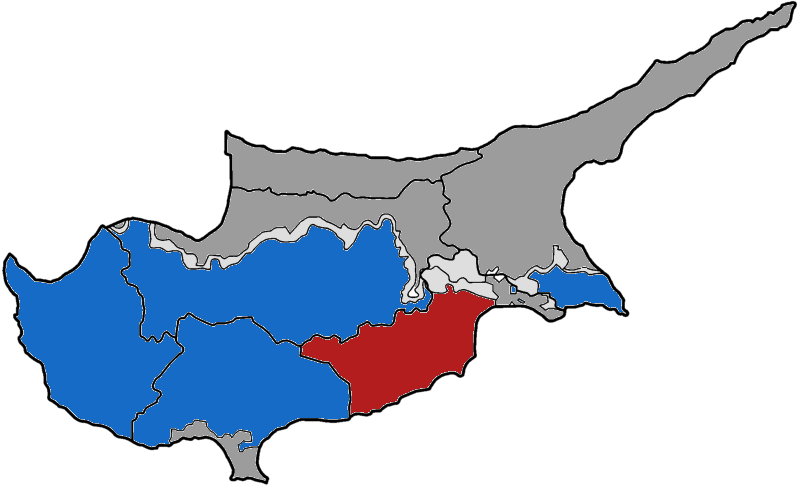
- Results by district

An election was held on 26 May 2019 to elect six representatives from Cyprus to the European Parliament.

The Democratic Rally (DISY) has won every election to the European Parliament since Cyprus joined the European Union in 2004.

According to final results, DISY again won the election with 29% and 2 seats. There were no changes in seat allocation, with AKEL also at 2 seats after securing 27% of the vote. DIKO and EDEK had 1 seat each, with 14% and 11% of the vote, respectively.

In terms of percentage, this was EDEK's best European elections result since 2004 (although that year it did not win any seats). Some attributed this in part to tactical voting, with many fearing the far-right ELAM gaining a seat had it finished fourth.

== Opinion polls ==
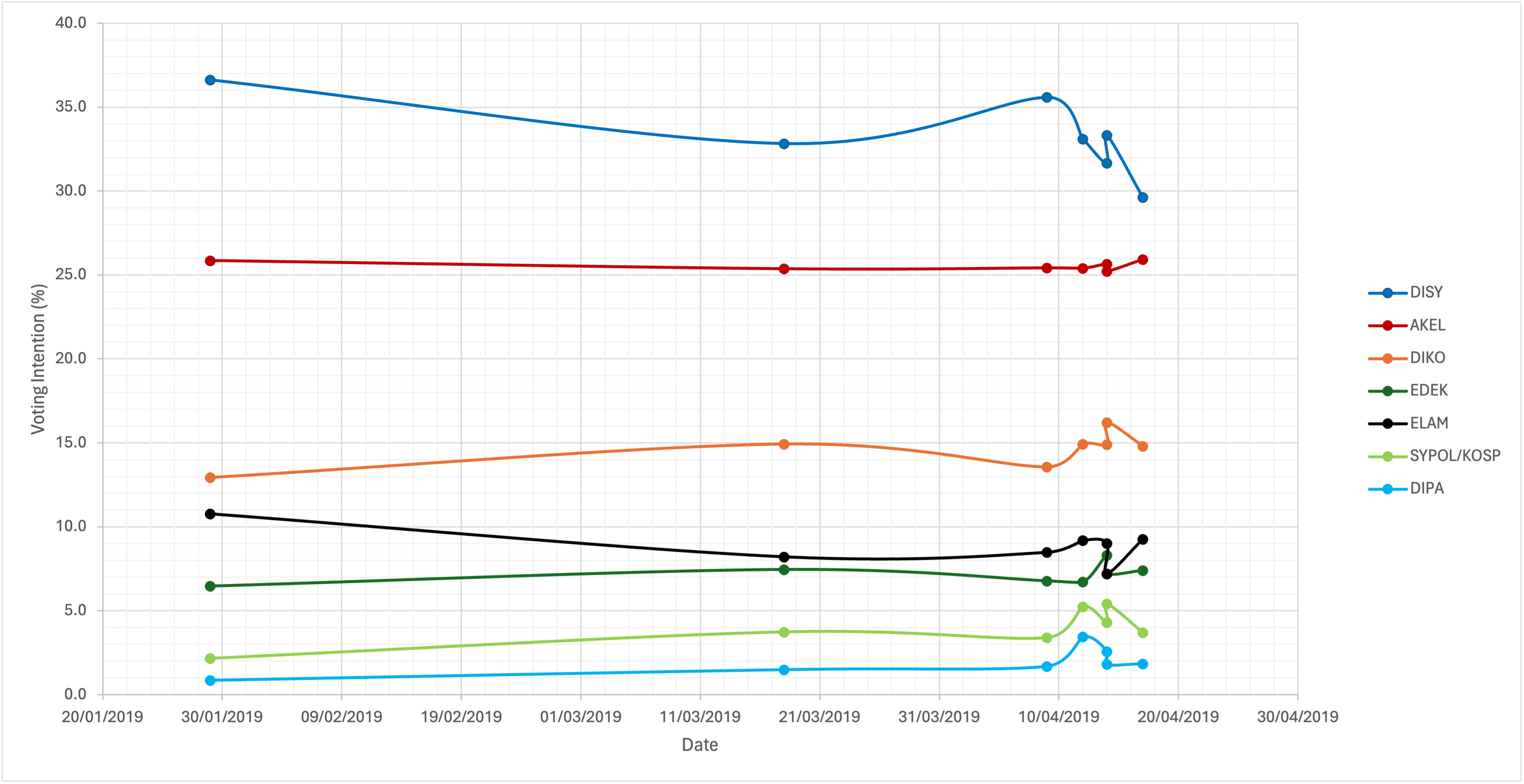

| Fieldwork date | Polling firm | Sample size | DISY | AKEL | DIKO | EDEK | ELAM | SYPOL/KOSP | DiPa | Others | Lead |
|---|---|---|---|---|---|---|---|---|---|---|---|
| 17 Apr 2019 | Cymar | – | 29.6 | 25.9 | 14.8 | 7.4 | 9.3 | 3.7 | 1.9 | 7.4 | 2 |
| 14 Apr 2019 | RIC | – | 33.3 | 25.2 | 16.2 | 7.2 | 7.2 | 5.4 | 1.8 | 3.6 | 4.5 |
| 14 Αpr 2019 | Prime Consulting | – | 31.7 | 25.6 | 14.9 | 8.3 | 9.0 | 4.3 | 2.6 | 3.6 | 4.2 |
| 12 Apr 2019 | Symmetron | 822 | 33.1 | 25.4 | 14.9 | 6.7 | 9.2 | 5.2 | 3.4 | 2.0 | 4.7 |
| 9 Apr 2019 | IMR | 1,200 | 35.6 | 25.4 | 13.6 | 6.8 | 8.5 | 3.4 | 1.7 | 5.1 | 6 |
| 18 Mar 2019 | Prime Consulting | 900 | 32.8 | 25.4 | 14.9 | 7.5 | 8.2 | 3.7 | 1.5 | 6.0 | 5 |
| 16–29 Jan 2019 | Pulse | 807 | 36.6 | 25.9 | 12.9 | 6.5 | 10.8 | 2.2 | 0.9 | 4.3 | 5 |
| 25 May 2014 | 2014 election | 258,914 | 37.8 | 27.0 | 10.8 | 7.7 | 2.7 | – | – | 3.1 | 10.8 |

== Results ==
| Party | Votes | % | Seats | +/– |
|---|---|---|---|---|
| Democratic Rally | 81,539 | 29.02 | 2 | 0 |
| AKEL–Left–New Forces | 77,241 | 27.49 | 2 | 0 |
| Democratic Party | 38,756 | 13.80 | 1 | 0 |
| Movement for Social Democracy | 29,715 | 10.58 | 1 | 0 |
| ELAM | 23,167 | 8.25 | 0 | 0 |
| Democratic Front | 10,673 | 3.80 | 0 | New |
| Citizens' Alliance–Movement of Ecologists | 9,232 | 3.29 | 0 | 0 |
| Jasmine Movement | 4,786 | 1.70 | 0 | New |
| Animal Party Cyprus | 2,208 | 0.79 | 0 | 0 |
| Patriotic Movement | 607 | 0.22 | 0 | New |
| Nationalist Liberation Movement | 569 | 0.20 | 0 | New |
| Union of Fighters for Justice | 457 | 0.16 | 0 | New |
| Cyprus Socialist Party | 170 | 0.06 | 0 | 0 |
| Independents | 1,815 | 0.65 | 0 | 0 |
| Total | 280,935 | 100.00 | 6 | 0 |
| Valid votes | 280,935 | 97.38 | | |
| Invalid/blank votes | 7,548 | 2.62 | | |
| Total votes | 288,483 | 100.00 | | |
| Registered voters/turnout | 641,181 | 44.99 | | |
Source: MOI
