= Charalambos Theopemptou =

Cypriot politician

Leader of the Movement of Ecologists – Citizens' Cooperation
- In office July 2020 – October 2023

Member of the Cypriot House of Representatives
- Incumbent
- Assumed office 2016
- Constituency: Nicosia

Personal details
- Born: 26 November 1955 (age 70)

Charalambos Theopemptou (born 26 November 1955) is a Cypriot politician, who was the leader of the Movement of Ecologists – Citizens' Cooperation from July 2020 until October 2023 and has served as a member of the Cypriot House of Representatives since 2016.

== Biography ==
Theopemptou represents Nicosia in the House of Representatives.

== Personal life ==
Theopemptou was born on 26 November 1955 to an ethnic Greek family.

== See also ==
- List of members of the House of Representatives (Cyprus), 2016–2021
