= Active Citizens – Movement of Cypriot United Hunters =

Active Citizens – Movement of Cypriot United Hunters Ενεργοί πολίτες – Κίνημα Ενωμένων Κύπριων Κυνηγών
- Abbreviation: KEKK
- President: Nikolas Prodromou
- Founded: 22 April 2018
- Headquarters: Larnaca, Cyprus
- Ideology: Green conservatism; Agrarianism; Social conservatism
- Colours: Green
- House of Representatives: 0 / 56
- European Parliament: 0 / 6
- Municipal Councils: 7 / 443

Website
- cyprushunters.com.cy

Active Citizens – Movement of Cypriot United Hunters (Greek: Ενεργοί πολίτες – Κίνημα Ενωμένων Κύπριων Κυνηγών, romanized: Energoí polítes – Kínima Enoménon Kýprion Kynigón) is a conservative political party in Cyprus that promotes sustainable animal hunting and the conservation of the natural environment. It was founded on 22 April 2018, in Larnaca and it is led by Nikolas Prodromou.

The party advocates for habitat conservation and responsible hunting practices, with a focus on promoting hunting and environmentalism through the educational system. It strongly opposes the development of Akamas, describing the cape as a "little heaven on earth" that must remain "virgin".

The party promotes the "traditional constitution of the family", vocally opposing same-sex marriage, which it describes as "insane" and "against human nature".

== Election results ==
=== Parliament ===
House of Representatives
Election	Votes			Seats	
Election	#	%	Rank	#	±
2021	11,712	3.27	8th	0 / 56	New
2026	11,890	3.20	8th	0 / 56	0

=== European Parliament ===
European Parliament
Election	Votes			Seats	
Election	#	%	Rank	#	±
2024	4,603	1.25	10th	0 / 6	new
