= Leondios G. Kostrikis =

Cypriot biochemist (born 1963)

- Born: April 20, 1963 (age 62); Nicosia, Cyprus
- Known for: Role of human genetics in HIV-1 transmission and AIDS disease progression
- Awards: Fulbright Scholar, Member of Cyprus Academy of Sciences, Letters, and Arts, Member of Academia Europaea
- Scientific career
- Fields: Molecular Virology
- Institutions: University of Cyprus

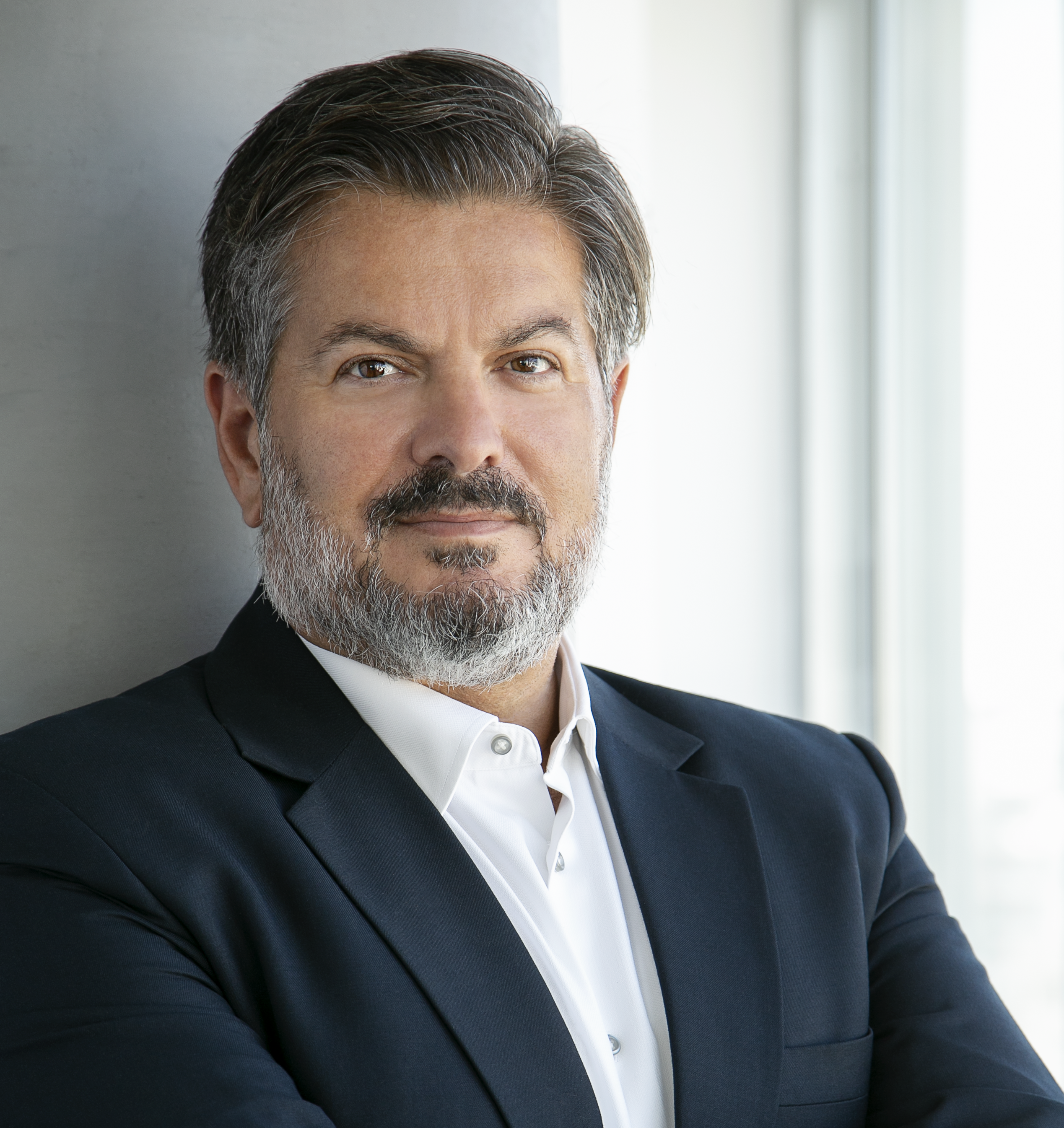

Leondios G. Kostrikis (born April 20, 1963) is a molecular virologist from Cyprus and a professor of molecular virology at the University of Cyprus. He is a founding member of the Cyprus Academy of Sciences, Letters and Arts and a member of Academia Europaea. In 2022, he attracted media attention with the news of having found a "Deltacron" Coronavirus variant, a recombinant between Delta and Omicron strains. The emergence of this phenomenon initially evoked scepticism, characterized by concerns primarily centered around contamination or coinfection as plausible etiological contributors. These hypotheses were predominantly disseminated through unsubstantiated assertions within the realms of social and mass media, lacking concurrent scientific evidence to validate their claims. Comparable observations on a global scale dispelled doubt, eventually leading to the recognition of Delta-Omicron variants by the scientific community and their subsequent monitoring by the World Health Organization.

== Early life and education ==
Kostrikis was born in Cyprus. He received his scientific education in Biochemistry from New York University. In 1987, he received his B.Sc. degree, supported by a Fulbright Scholarship. In 1993, he received his Ph.D. from the same university

== Career ==
He moved to Aaron Diamond AIDS Research Center (ADARC) to do HIV-1 research. In 1999, he was appointed Assistant Professor of Rockefeller University. In 2003, he returned to Cyprus. He became Head of Laboratory of Biotechnology and Molecular Virology and Professor of Molecular Virology at the University of Cyprus. In 2019, he was elected as a Founding Member (Biological Sciences) of The Cyprus Academy of Sciences, Letters and Arts and in 2020, he was elected as Member of the Biosciences Steering Panel of the European Academies Science Advisory Council (EASAC) and as a Distinguished Fellow of the International Engineering and Technology Institute (IETI). In 2020, he received the Cyprus Distinguished Researcher Award in Life Sciences from the Research and Innovation Foundation in Cyprus. In 2024, he was elected as a Member of The Academia Europaea (Academy of Europe) in the Section of Biochemistry and Molecular Biology

=== SARS-CoV-2 Deltacron hybrid variant ===
Following the emergence of COVID-19 Omicron variant, Kostrikis announced in January 2022 in local TV that his Cypriot health research team in Nicosia had found a new COVID-19 variant, dubbing it "Deltacron". Following the initial announcement, indiscriminate news of the COVID-19 hybrid variant dubbed "Deltacron" spread quickly in mainstream media.

Maria Van Kerkhove (WHO's COVID-19 Technical Leader), Krutika Kuppalli (member of WHO's COVID-19 Technical Team) and Thomas Peacock, a postdoctoral fellow (Imperial College London) challenged this announcement, saying a lab mistake was a more probable explanation for Cyprus lab's finding, although they did not provide any experimental data refuting the finding. Initially, some journalists have argued, without providing any experimental data, that it is most likely the result of a lab contamination, which purportedly shares specific properties with two different strains. Kostrikis' team has published a peer-reviewed study, providing experimental data that confirms the original observation about Deltacron was correct. Additionally, substantial scientific evidence has been produced since then, supporting the existence of Deltacron (Delta-Omicron) viruses, characterized by Delta (AY.4, AY.x) and Omicron (BA.1, BA.1.1, BA.2, BA.x) variants, which have been identified and verified by various laboratories around the world.
