= Gabrielle Louise McIntyre =

Australian lawyer

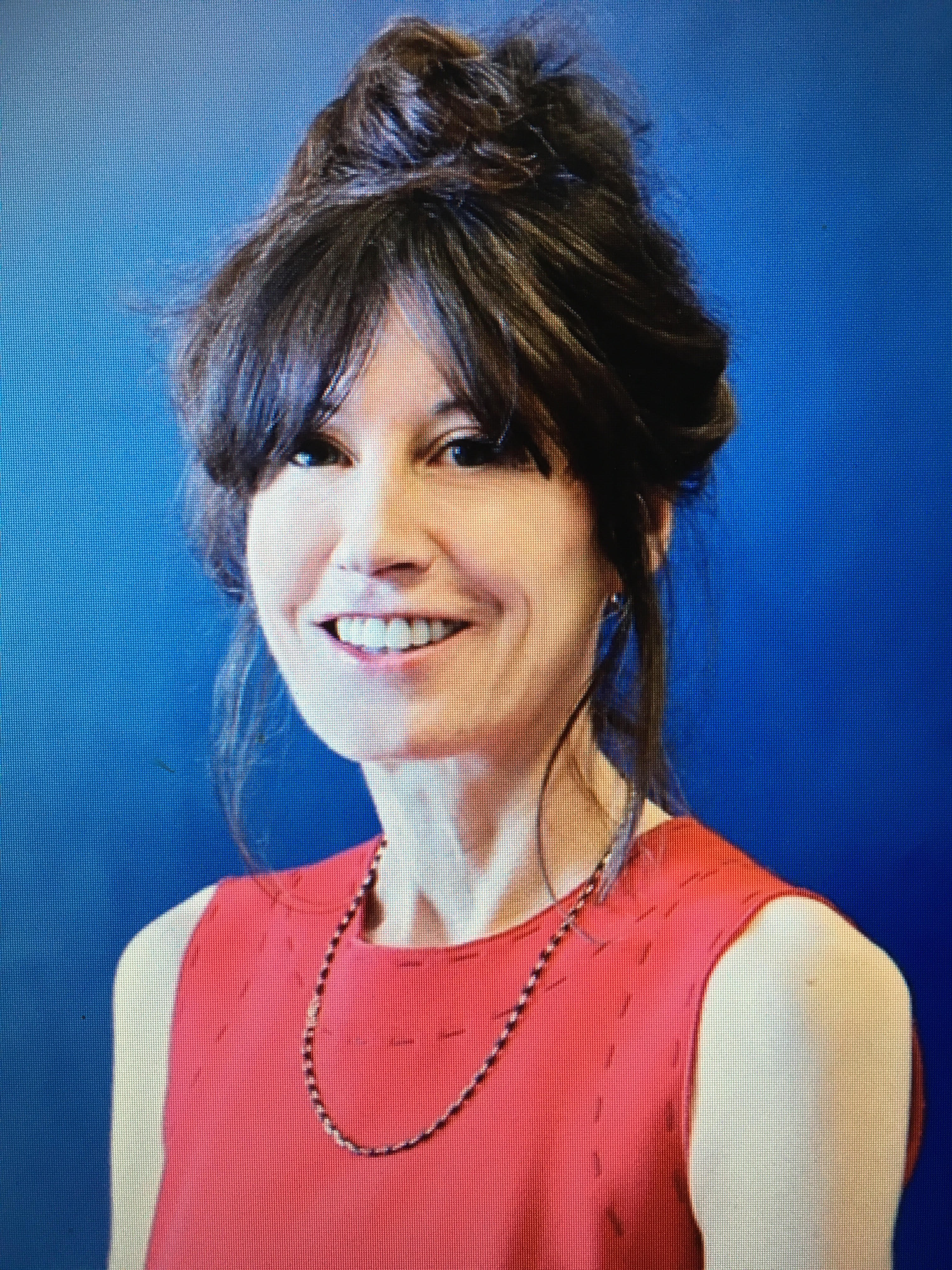
- Gabrielle Louise McIntyre

Gabrielle Louise McIntyre is an Australian international legal practitioner, jurist, and served as the Chairperson of the Seychelles' Truth, Reconciliation and National Unity Commission.

She previously served as the Chef de Cabinet and Principal Legal Advisor to the President of the International Residual Mechanism for Criminal Tribunals (IRMCT), the successor institution to the International Criminal Tribunal for the former Yugoslavia (ICTY) and the International Criminal Tribunal for Rwanda (ICTR). Before that, McIntyre served as the Chef de Cabinet and Principal Legal Advisor to four successive Presidents of the ICTY: Judge Theodor Meron (two periods of two consecutive terms each), Judge Fausto Pocar, and Judge Patrick Lipton Robinson. She has also served as the acting Head of Chambers of the ICTY.

== About ==
An expert in international legal practice, international humanitarian law, international criminal law, human rights law, and administrative law, McIntyre has managed legal proceedings for Judges of the ICTY at all stages of proceedings, including pre-trial, trial, and appeal, and has extensive experience with international court practice and common and civil law procedural rules. She has represented the Presidents on the ICTY Rules Committee and devised and drafted a number of rules aimed at streamlining judicial proceedings. She has also developed policy and practice directions aimed at facilitating the efficient conduct of the judicial work of the Tribunals. McIntyre has published and lectured widely in the field of international criminal justice and participated in numerous practical judicial trainings in The Hague, the former Yugoslavia, and Sierra Leone, sharing her expertise with national judiciaries She has been responsible for overseeing external relations and communications policy for both the ICTY and the Mechanism and, at the ICTY, spearheaded a wide range of initiatives aimed at facilitating a greater understanding of international criminal law and the ICTY's work and legacy, including a series of conferences held in The Hague and countries of the former Yugoslavia. In his remarks at the ICTY Global Legacy Conference in 2011, then-President Robinson attributed the conception, the implementation, and the success of the global and local legacy conferences to McIntyre. She has also contributed to a variety of expert projects and undertakings related to the International Criminal Court (ICC).

McIntyre has an honours degree (First Class) in Law from the University of Adelaide, South Australia, and a master's degree (First Class) in international law from the University of Cambridge, England. She has previously served as an associate in the Supreme Court of South Australia and as an advisor in the South Australian Attorney-General's Office. She holds a practicing certificate in the State of South Australia and is on the list of Defence Counsel for the International Criminal Court.

== Truth, Reconciliation and National Unity Commission ==
In 2019, McIntyre was sworn in as Chairperson of the Truth, Reconciliation and National Unity Commission (The commission) in the Seychelles following her appointment by the Seychelles’ President, Danny Faure. The commission began its preparatory work in May 2019.

The commission was composed of six national Commissioners in addition to McIntyre serving as chairperson. Modeled on the South African Truth Commission, the commission was mandated to investigate individual complaints of human rights violations related to the Coup d’état of 1977. It aimed to establish the truth to create a common understanding about the past amongst the Seychellois to allow the country to move forward with a common agenda, and ensure non-repetition. The commission was given the power to grant amnesty and to recommend reparations and rehabilitation measures to reconcile the people of Seychelles.

The commission received over 500 individual complaints, McIntyre led the investigation and determination of the 371 complaints deemined admissible. Many concerned allegations of enforced disappearance, unlawful killing, torture and discrimination perpetrated by former Presidents France Albert René and James Michel, as well as senior officials in the army, state security and the police, some of whom still retained their positions within Government. Most complainants appeared before the Commission in live televised hearings recounting their experiences to the commission and the broader public of Seychelles for the first time. For some the experience was cathartic, for others it brought back trauma that had remained buried under a cloak of fear for decades.

On 31 March 2023, McIntyre handed over the Final Report of the commission to the President of Seychelles, Wavel Ramkalawan, during a ceremony at State House,^{[1]} despite the commission's financial constraints, capacity issues and non-cooperation by Government officials. In so doing, McIntyre underscored the success of the work of the Commission despite the obstacles, detailed in volume one of the five volume Final Report and credited the strong commitment of the National Commissioners as the cornerstone of the commission's success.

The Final Report includes 371 individual written determinations on the complaints filed, and volumes dedicated to the historical context, the commission's amnesty proceedings, reparations, and a list of recommendations to Government to guarantee non-repetition. On receipt, the President made the Final Report publicly available on the Statehouse website. The Commission strongly recommended the establishment of a successor body to ensure the proper implementation of the commission's victims led reparations policy. In August 2023, the LDS Government and US opposition party endorsed the commission's recommendations and agreed on the establishment of a successor body. To date that body remains to be established.

== Judicial work ==
During her tenure as Chef de Cabinet at the ICTY, McIntyre managed numerous appeals proceedings, providing judicial support in court and devising solutions to the full ambit of procedural issues with a view toward preparing a case for hearing and eventual judgement. In this role, she drafted, reviewed or revised almost all major judgements and decisions of the ICTY and ICTR Appeals Chambers, serving as the final quality check of all drafts to ensure their legal integrity. In addition to hundreds of interlocutory, pre-appeal, and presidential decisions — dealing with a host of procedural and substantive matters, including immunity of defence counsel, rights of self-representation, provisional release, issuance of subpoenas, admissibility of evidence, delayed disclosure, the legality principle, clarifying elements of offences, fairness of time allocations, equality of arms, remuneration of defence counsel, and contempt and false testimony — the appeal judgements rendered during her tenure include those in the ICTY cases of Zdravko Mucić et al., Radislav Krstić, Dragan Nikolić, Miroslav Deronjić, Milomir Stakić, Stanislav Galić, Vidoje Blagojević & Dragan Jokić, Fatmir Limaj et al., Enver Hadžihasanović & Amir Kubura, Pavle Strugar, Milan Martić, Ljube Boškoski & Johan Tarčulovski, Ramush Haradinaj et al., Florence Hartmann, Ante Gotovina & Mladen Markač, Momčilo Perišić, and Zdravko Tolimir, and those in the ICTR cases of Georges Rutaganda, Eliézer Niyitegeka, Elizaphan & Gérard Ntakirutimana, Laurent Semanza, Jean de Dieu Kamuhanda, André Ntagerura et al., Mikaeli Muhimana, Aloys Simba, Ferdinand Nahimana et al., Tharcisse Muvunyi, Léonidas Nshogoza, Simon Bikindi, Siméon Nchamihigo, Yussuf Munyakazi, Théoneste Bagosora & Anatole Nsengiyumva, Aloys Ntabakuze, Justin Mugenzi & Prosper Mugiraneza, Grégoire Ndahimana, Augustin Ndindiliyimana et al., Augustin Bizimungu, Édouard Karemera & Matthieu Ngirumpatse, and Ildéphonse Nizeyimana.

During her tenure as Chef de Cabinet and Principal Legal Advisor to the President of the Mechanism, McIntyre advised on and reviewed all rulings related to the pre-appeal and appeal proceedings in the Mechanism's Radovan Karadžić, Ratko Mladić, Augustin Ngirabatware, and Vojislav Šešelj cases, the review proceedings in the Ngirabatware and Laurent Semenza cases before the Mechanism, and rulings in the pre-appeal and appeal proceedings in the ICTY's Jadranko Prlić et al. case, in addition to numerous other judicial matters including those involving allegations of contempt and false testimony. As at the ICTY, she oversaw the management of the cases over which the President presided and was responsible for ensuring the legal integrity of the rulings in those cases.

In addition, as the President at both the ICTY and the Mechanism held supervisory authority over the decision-making of the administration, McIntyre was responsible for advising on and overseeing the determination of administrative decisions with respect to requests for judicial review spanning a wide range of issues including challenges to assessments of indigence, challenges to assessments of remuneration owed to defence counsel, detainee complaints concerning conditions of detention, allegations by detainees of violations of due process rights and numerous other allegations of abuse of discretion in administrative decision-making.

Before joining the Office of the President of the ICTY, McIntyre served as the legal advisor to ICTY Judge David Hunt (judge) and assisted with the management of pre-trial proceedings in the cases of Vidoje Blagojević & Dragan Jokić, Radoslav Brđanin & Momir Talić, Dragan Nikolić, Dragan Obrenović, and Stevan Todorović, providing judicial support in court and drafting many procedural and substantive decisions on procedural matters, including the form of the indictment, the scope of prosecutorial disclosure obligations, and standards to be established prior to issuance of protective measures and rights to Counsel. McIntyre also managed the trial proceedings in the cases of Milorad Krnojelac and Mitar Vasiljević, providing in-court judicial support, assisting in the management of huge volumes of evidence, conducting evidentiary assessments, and drafting the judgements, and she was also instrumental in ensuring the efficient conduct of pre-appeal proceedings in the cases of Tihomir Blaškić, Dario Kordić & Mario Čerkez, and Radislav Krstić, including advising on the disposition of motions for the admission of additional evidence on appeal and clarifying the applicable legal framework.

== Further Tribunal service ==
During her long tenure at the ICTY and then the Mechanism, McIntyre has served as a principal legal advisor on a wide range of matters pertaining to the leadership of these institutions. She has also played a central role in advising on the establishment of the Mechanism as an institution, including in relation to the development and amendment of the Mechanism's Rules of Procedure and Evidence as well as a wide range of policies and practices. Among other things, she has been instrumental in ensuring the effective implementation of the remote judging model of the Mechanism.

In addition, McIntyre has served as a member of the Disciplinary Panel adjudicating claims of misconduct on the part of Counsel appearing before the ICTY and rendering judgements on those claims. She has also served as a member of the performance assessment rebuttal panel (rendering decisions on allegations of procedural unfairness) and a member of the review board (addressing downsizing matters) and she is currently a member of the Advisory Panel at the Mechanism, with a mandate to provide advice to the President and the Registrar on matters relating to Defence Counsel, including, inter alia, advising on Rules of Procedure and Evidence, the Code of Conduct, and policies and practice directions of the Mechanism. In April 2018, McIntyre was named the Focal Point for Gender and the Focal Point for the Prevention of Sexual Exploitation and Sexual Abuse for the Hague Branch of the Mechanism.

== Judicial nominations and election ==
McIntyre has been nominated for a number of positions in the international judiciary. Among other nominations, in 2013, McIntyre was nominated to be a judge at the ICTY. She was nominated for the position by Saint Vincent and the Grenadines and enjoyed strong support of Australia. She received 56 votes in the second round of voting at the United Nations General Assembly but lost the election to the Togolese candidate. There were no votes traded during the election to assist McIntyre.

== Capacity building ==
At the ICTY, McIntyre was responsible for the development, fundraising for, and implementation of Tribunal legacy projects including the War Crimes Justice Project, a four-year project funded by the European Commission in partnership with OSCE and UNICRI directed towards building national judicial capacity in the adjudication of war crimes cases. She has also led numerous practical judicial trainings in The Hague, the former Yugoslavia, and Sierra Leone, sharing her expertise with national judiciaries

In addition, McIntyre assisted international prosecutors in the preparation of war crimes cases for trial in the civil law jurisdiction of Kosovo while assigned to the United Nations Mission in Kosovo as the Head of the War Crimes Department, appearing in court alongside the prosecutors. In this role, she also worked with local national authorities on a range of transitional justice measures aimed at ensuring accountability and supporting peace-building initiatives.

In 2018, she was appointed Chair of the Advisory Committee to the Sarajevo Information Centre on the International Criminal Tribunal for the former Yugoslavia, established by the City of Sarajevo to promote greater understanding of the work and legacy of the ICTY. McIntyre spoke at the formal opening of the Centre in May 2018.

In 2024, she assisted in the development of a legal guide to assist Ukrainian prosecutors to investigate environmental war crimes, under an initiative led by Richard J Rogers.

== Women’s Initiatives for Gender Justice ==
McIntyre is the chair of the Board of Directors of the Women's Initiatives for Gender Justice, an international women's human rights organization that advocates for gender justice in international and domestic fora, with a particular focus on proceedings at the ICC. In this capacity, McIntyre has been responsible for overseeing the work of the organization, its governance, and the fulfillment of its mandate.

McIntyre is currently the co-coordinator of a mentoring programme for international judges developed in partnership with Africa Legal Aid entitled, “A Gender Sensitive Approach to Mentoring ICC Judges and Judges of Other International Courts and Tribunals”, which aims to increase gender-awareness amongst international judges, and was previously recognized by the same organization on International Women's Day as a "phenomenal woman".

== Expert advisory consultations concerning the International Criminal Court ==
In view of her expertise in international judicial practice and, in particular, international court proceedings, McIntyre was invited to serve as a member of the panel of independent experts who produced a report in December 2014 designed “to identify, from the point of view primarily of practitioners, the principal problems of effectiveness affecting the work of the Court with a view to offer practical and realistic solutions intended to improve upon the quality, cost and expeditiousness of ICC proceedings.” McIntyre participated in discussions of the report and related matters at a high-level retreat on strengthening proceedings at the ICC in September 2014.

== Publications and lectures ==
McIntyre's expertise with international criminal practice led to her taking a leading role as a primary drafter and editor of the ICTY Manual on Developed Practices, which sets out in detail the legal practices of the ICTY from investigations to appellate proceedings and details the procedural steps along the way.

She has also authored articles on human rights and international criminal law and procedure, including “International Residual Mechanism and the Legacy of the International Criminal Tribunals for the Former Yugoslavia and Rwanda” (3 Goettingen J Int’l L 923 (2011)) and “Equality of Arms – Defining Human Rights in the Jurisprudence of the International Criminal Tribunal for the former Yugoslavia” (16 Leiden J Int’l L 269 (2003)). She is a contributing author to The Oxford Companion to International Criminal Justice and International Criminal Law Developments in the Case Law of the ICTY. Invited to serve as an expert for ICC Forum to address the question of ICC performance, McIntyre published her essay on performance indicators, entitled “Performance Assessment Cannot Take Place in a Vacuum”, in 2017. In 2018, her essay on the ICC's treatment of crimes of sexual and gender-based violence was published by the American Journal of International Law as part of its Symposium on the Rome Statute at Twenty. In 2020, her article on the impact on the ICC's legitimacy of a lack of consistency and coherence in the Court's decision-making was published. In 2021, McIntyre's article The ICC, Self-created Challenges and Missed Opportunities to Legitimize Authority over Non-states Parties was published in the Journal of International Criminal Justice.

McIntyre has lectured widely on international criminal practice, international humanitarian law, international criminal law and procedure, and international justice generally and with regard to the ICTY, the ICTR, and the ICC. Among other things, she has delivered remarks at events organised by the Grotius Centre for International Legal Studies in 2012 and 2015 on the role of the legal officer and judgement drafting, and at conferences focused on the legacy of the ICTY in Sarajevo and Zagreb in 2012. In 2014 she spoke at the ICTR's legacy symposium in Tanzania on the assessment of evidence. She also took part in an expert seminar at the Hague Institute for Global Justice concerning efficiency at the ICC in 2014, addressing issues related to victim participation. In 2016, she provided remarks before the International Association for Court Administration on the international standards and best practices related to independence, impartiality, and integrity of justice, examining the responsibilities and obligations of judges. In 2018, she moderated a panel discussion on “Israel and the ICC - Exploring Israel's Legal Perspective" in The Hague and gave introductory remarks identifying the complexity of the jurisdictional issues surrounding the situation in Palestine. In 2019, she delivered remarks in honor of the contributions of Judge Theodor Meron to international criminal justice at the 2019 ADC-ICT Annual Conference.

She is regularly featured as a presenter or contributing expert at events organized in connection with meetings of the ICC Assembly of States Parties, including speaking about exit strategies for the ICC at a side event during the eleventh Assembly of States Parties in 2012. In 2013 she presented on modes of liability at the twelfth session of the Assembly of States Parties, and she spoke at the launch of the Gender Report Card on the International Criminal Court 2014 during the thirteenth session of the Assembly of States Parties. In 2016, she headlined a meeting with members of civil society focused on the work of the Mechanism during the fifteenth session of the Assembly of States Parties. In April 2019 McIntyre moderated an event organised by the Assembly of State Parties Co-Focal Points for Complementarity Facilitation on completion strategies across ICC activities. In December 2021, McIntyre presented 'No Women or Girls Left Behind: Programming Through a Gender Lens' to the Assembly of State Parties in an event organised by the Trust Fund for Victims.

McIntyre has also lectured widely on issues related to gender and gender-based violence in armed conflict. In 2017 she delivered a lecture on sexual violence in armed conflict at an international conference on women and national security held in Australia, speaking on the sidelines concerning violence against women and the role of international courts. Later that same year she was a featured speaker at an ICC Side Event to the GQUAL Conference: Changing the Picture of International Justice. In 2019, she was a featured speaker at the Second Annual Diversity and Inclusion event hosted by the Organisation for the Prohibition of Chemical Weapons. Later that same year she delivered remarks and moderated a panel in The Hague on Efforts to End Impunity: National and International Perspectives of the Prosecution of Sexual and Gender-based Crimes. She also spoke on a panel focused on Gender Justice: Progress and Challenges of prosecuting sexual and gender based crimes at the International Bar Association annual conference on international criminal law. In December 2020, she participated in a panel discussion during the ANZIL Zoom Keynote Lecture Series, entitled "The International Criminal Court: Threats, Challenges, and Opportunities."

McIntyre has frequently authored and co-authored blog posts on issues in international criminal law:

- What Lessons Can We Learn from the Prosecutor's Election? Part I - Opinio Juris
- What Lessons Can We Learn from the Prosecutor's Election? Part II - Opinio Juris
- The Use of AI at the ICC: Should we Have Concerns? Part I - Opinio Juris
- The Use of AI at the ICC: Should we Have Concerns? Part II - Opinio Juris
