= Citizens' Alliance (Cyprus) =

Citizens' Alliance Συμμαχία Πολιτών
- President: Giorgos Lillikas
- Founder: Giorgos Lillikas
- Founded: 28 April 2013
- Dissolved: 24 June 2021
- Merged into: EDEK
- Ideology: Social democracy; Euroscepticism; Greek Cypriot nationalism
- Political position: Centre to centre-left
- Colours: Green, Blue

Website
- www.symmaxiapoliton.org

Citizens' Alliance (Greek: Συμμαχία Πολιτών, Symmachía Politón) was a political party that aimed for a unitary republic of Cyprus and rejected a federation of the Greek Cypriot and the Turkish parts. The party's leader was Giorgos Lillikas. It opposed the austerity program in Cyprus and was opposed to the privatization of state assets.

== History ==
On 24 June 2021, the party announced that it began discussions with the Movement for Social Democracy party, to merge Citizens' Alliance into the latter. In addition, party leader Giorgos Lillikas, announced his intention to retire from political life. The party officially ceased to exist on 21 June 2021 (as per the political party register) and the party website is no longer in operation.

== Election results ==
=== Parliament ===
House of Representatives
Election	Votes			Seats	
Election	#	%	Rank	#	±
2016	21,114	6.01	5th	3 / 56	New
2021	With EDEK			0 / 56	▼3

=== European Parliament ===
European Parliament
Election	Votes			Seats	
Election	#	%	Rank	#	±
2014	17,549	6.78	5th	0 / 6	New
2019	9,232	3.29	7th	0 / 6	0
