= Marinos Sizopoulos =

Cypriot politician

- Μαρίνος Σιζόπουλος
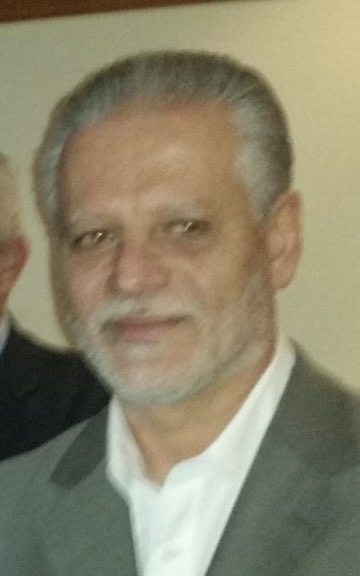
- Sizopoulos in 2015

President of the Movement for Social Democracy
- In office 1 March 2015 – 1 June 2025
- Preceded by: Yiannakis Omirou
- Succeeded by: Nikos Anastasiou

Member of the Cypriot House of Representatives
- In office 2016–2026
- Constituency: Limassol
- In office 2003–2011
- Constituency: Limassol

Personal details
- Born: 17 July 1957 (age 69) Nicosia, Cyprus
- Party: Movement for Social Democracy (EDEK)
- Children: two (Christina, Evita)
- Education: Aristotle University of Thessaloniki
- Profession: Dermatologist

Marinos Sizopoulos (Greek: Μαρίνος Σιζόπουλος; born 17 July 1957 in Nicosia) is a Cypriot politician who had served as the President of the Movement for Social Democracy (EDEK) from 2015 to 2025 and as a member of the House of Representatives from 2016 to 2026 and from 2003 to 2011.

== Biography ==
Sizopoulos' election as President of EDEK followed the resignation of Yiannakis Omirou.

In parliament, he represents the Limassol District, having been initially sworn in in 2003 after his predecessor had to leave his position due to his appointment to the cabinet, with Sizopoulos having been his runner-up at the parliamentary elections two years earlier. Sizopoulos was elected to a full term in 2008, but failed to win re-election in 2011. He returned as a lawmaker in the 2016 elections and was once again re-elected in 2021.

Party political offices
Preceded by	Leader of the Movement for Social Democracy; 2015–	Incumbent
