= Movement of Ecologists – Citizens' Cooperation =

Movement of Ecologists – Citizens' Cooperation Κίνημα Οικολόγων – Συνεργασία Πολιτών
- Leader: vacant
- Founded: 1996; 30 years ago
- Headquarters: Nicosia, Cyprus
- Youth wing: NEOI (Youth of Environmentalists)
- Women's wing: GYKO
- Ideology: Green politics; Anti-federalism
- Political position: Centre-left
- European affiliation: European Green Party
- International affiliation: Global Greens
- Colours: Green
- House of Representatives: 0 / 56
- European Parliament: 0 / 6
- Municipal Councils: 7 / 443

Website
- cyprusgreens.org

The Movement of Ecologists – Citizens' Cooperation (Greek: Κίνημα Οικολόγων – Συνεργασία Πολιτών, romanized: Kínima Oikológon – Synergasía Politón, ΚΟΣΠ, KOSP), formerly known as the Ecological and Environmental Movement (Greek: Κίνημα Οικολόγων Περιβαλλοντιστών, romanized: Kínima Oikológon Perivallontistón), is a green political party in Cyprus.

In both the 2001 and 2006 legislative elections, the party won 2.0% of the popular vote and 1 of 56 seats. In 2011, it garnered 2.2% of the popular vote, and its sole parliamentarian, George Perdikes, retained his seat.

The party increased its seat count from 1 to 2 following the 2016 legislative elections, where it obtained 4.8% of the vote, coming in seventh place. In the same year, the party adopted its current name and a new logo.

In the 2026 legislative elections, the party lost all its seats in the House of Representatives, rendering it without parliamentary representation for the first time since the 1996 election.

== Election results ==
=== Parliament ===
House of Representatives
Election	Votes			Seats	
Election	#	%	Rank	#	±
1996	3,710	1.00	8th	0 / 56	new
2001	8,129	1.98	8th	1 / 56	▲1
2006	8,193	1.95	6th	1 / 56	0
2011	8,960	2.21	6th	1 / 56	0
2016	16,909	4.81	7th	2 / 56	▲1
2021	15,762	4.41	7th	3 / 56	▲1
2026	7,264	1.95	11th	0 / 56	▼3

=== European Parliament ===
European Parliament
Election	Votes			Seats	
Election	#	%	Rank	#	±
2024	4,742	1.29	9th	0 / 6	new
