= List of members of the European Parliament for Cyprus, 2019–2024 =

This is a list of the 6 members of the European Parliament for Cyprus in the 2019 to 2024 session.

== List ==
Name	Photograph	National Party	EP Group	Ref
Loukas Fourlas		Democratic Rally	EPP	
1. Lefteris Christoforou (2019-2022); 2. Eleni Stavrou (2022-2024)		Democratic Rally	EPP	
Giorgos Georgiou		Progressive Party of Working People	EUL–NGL	
Niyazi Kızılyürek		Progressive Party of Working People	EUL–NGL	
Costas Mavrides		Democratic Party	S&D	
Dimitris Papadakis		Movement for Social Democracy (2019-2020) Independent (2020-present)	S&D	

== Party Representation ==
National Party	EP Group	Seats	±
Democratic Rally	EPP	2 / 6	▲1
Progressive Party of Working People	EUL–NGL	2 / 6	Steady
Democratic Party	S&D	1 / 6	Steady
Movement for Social Democracy	S&D	(2019-2020) 1 / 6	Steady
Movement for Social Democracy	S&D	(2020-present) 0 / 6	▼1
