= List of female members of the European Parliament for Cyprus =

This is a list of women who have served as members of the European Parliament representing Cyprus.

Cyprus currently has no female members serving as MEPS for the first time since 2009.

== List of female members of the European Parliament for Cyprus ==
Image	Name	National party	EP Group	First elected	Year left	Ref.
	Eleni Theocharous	Democratic Rally (until 2014)	EPP (until 2016)	2009	2019	
	Eleni Theocharous	Solidarity Movement (from 2016)	ECR (from 2016)	2009	2019	
	Antigoni Papadopoulou	Democratic Party	S&D	2009	2014	
	Eleni Stavrou	Democratic Rally	EPP	2022 (Note: Replacement for Lefteris Christoforou.)	2024	
