= Politics of Cyprus =

== Ministries ==
The Ministers form the Council of Ministers, including other members who may not be listed, which is an independent collective body with independent powers.

1. Ministry of Agriculture, Rural Development and Environment, Minister: Petros Xenophontos
2. Ministry of Energy, Commerce and Industry, Minister: Giorgos Papanastasiou
3. Ministry of Transport, Communications and Works, Minister: Alexis Vafiades
4. Ministry of Defence, Minister: Vasilis Palmas
5. Ministry of Education, Sport and Youth, Minister: Athena Michaelidou
6. Ministry of Finance, Minister: Makis Keravnos
7. Ministry of Foreign Affairs, Minister: Constantinos Kombos
8. Ministry of Health, Minister: Popi Kanari
9. Ministry of Interior, Minister: Constantinos Ioannou
10. Ministry of Justice and Public Order, Minister: Anna Prokopiou
11. Ministry of Labour and Social Insurance, Minister: Yiannis Panayiotou

=== Deputy Ministries ===
1. Deputy Ministry of Shipping, Deputy Minister: Marina Hadjimanoli
2. Deputy Ministry of Tourism, Deputy Minister: Costas Koumis
3. Deputy Ministry of Research, Innovation and Digital Policy, Deputy Minister: Nicodemos Damianou
4. Deputy Ministry of Social Welfare, Deputy Minister: Marilena Evangelou
5. Deputy Ministry of Culture, Deputy Minister: Vasiliki Kassianidou
6. Deputy Ministry of Migration and International Asylum, Deputy Minister: Nicholas A Ioannides

== Legislative branch ==
The House of Representatives (Greek: Βουλή των Αντιπροσώπων, romanized: Voulḗ tōn Antiprosṓpōn; Turkish: Temsilciler Meclisi) has 59 members elected for a five-year term: 56 Greek Cypriot members chosen by proportional representation and 3 observer members representing the Maronite, Latin Catholic and Armenian minorities. 24 seats are allocated to the Turkish community, but are currently vacant.

== Political parties ==
=== Democratic Rally (DISY) ===
The centre-right Democratic Rally (DISY) is the largest political party in Cyprus, currently holding 17 of the 56 seats in the House of Representatives. Founded on July 4, 1976, by veteran politician Glafcos Clerides, DISY emerged from the split of the right-wing "Eniaion" into two opposing parties: DISY and DIKO.

DISY is a Christian democratic and liberal-conservative party, often described as the most Atlanticist, pro-NATO and pro-EU party in Cyprus. The party is currently led by Annita Demetriou, who also serves as the President of the Cypriot House of Representatives, making her the first woman to hold this office. Two former leaders of the party have served as Presidents of Cyprus, Glafcos Clerides (1993–2003) and Nicos Anastasiades (2013–2023). DISY is a member of the European People's Party.

Over the years, internal disagreements, particularly regarding the Cyprus issue, have led to the formation of three splinter parties: the European Party (EvroKo), European Democracy (EvroDi) and Solidarity Movement. The current President of Cyprus, Nikos Christodoulides, was previously a member of DISY and served as Government Spokesman (2014–2018) and Minister of Foreign Affairs (2018–2022) under Anastasiades. Christodoulides sought DISY's nomination for the 2023 presidential election, but following accusations of undermining his campaign, he resigned from his ministerial role and launched an independent candidacy.

==== Notable Figures ====
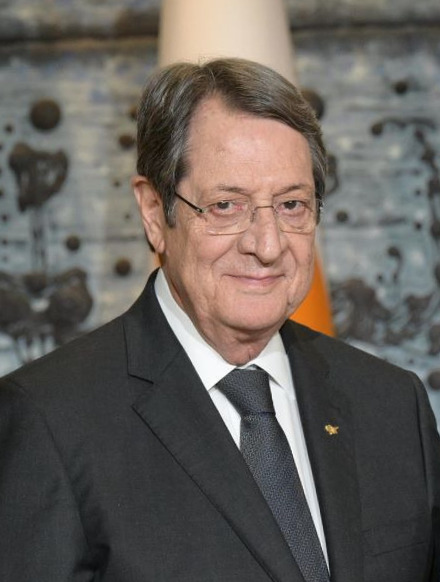
Nikos Anastasiades, former MP, President of DISY (1997–2013) and President of Cyprus (2013–2023).

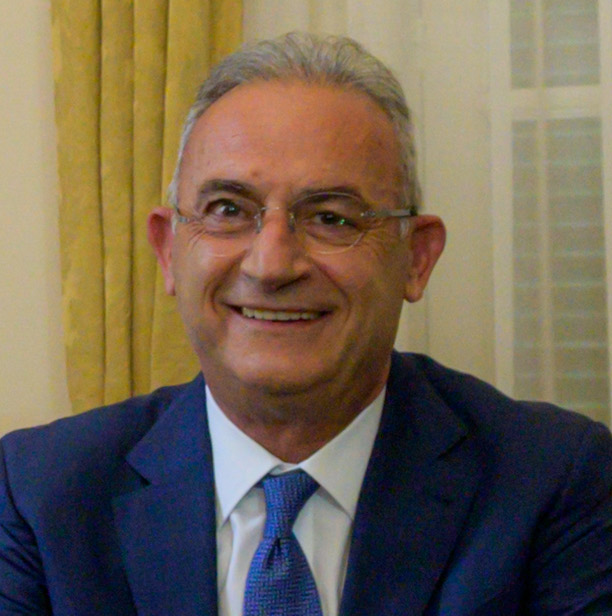
MP Averof Neofytou, former President of DISY (2013–2023) and DISY's candidate for the 2023 presidential election.

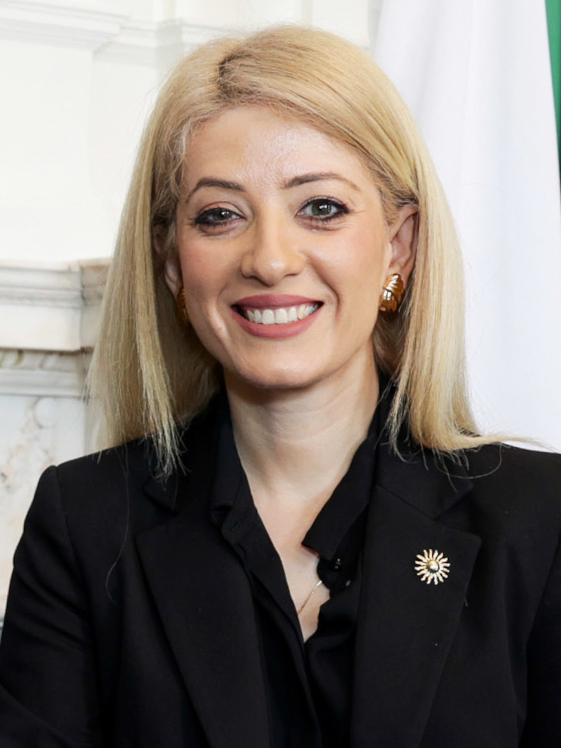
MP Annita Demetriou, President of DISY (2023–present) and President of the House of Representatives (2021–present).

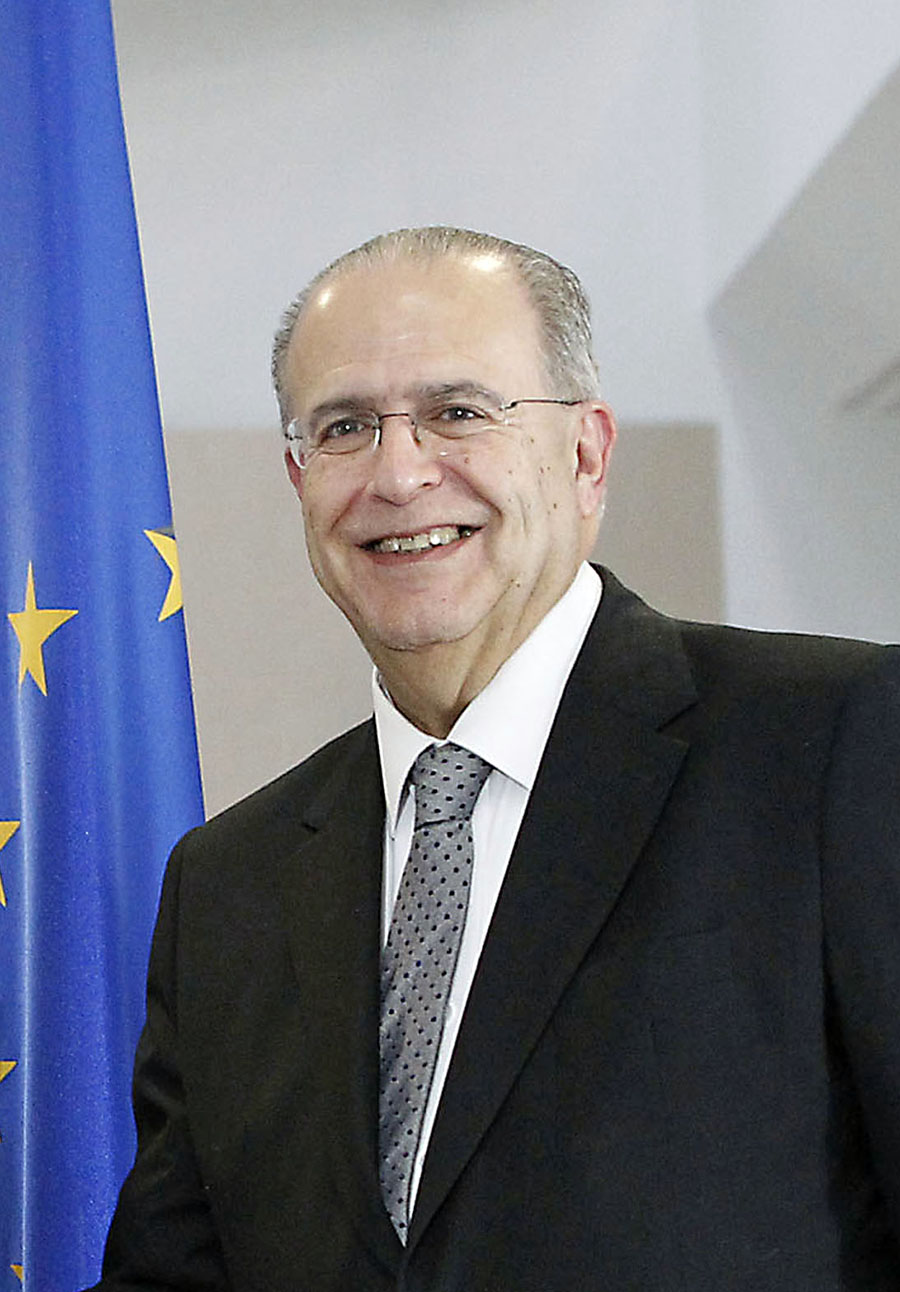
Ioannis Kasoulidis, former Minister of Foreign Affairs, MEP and DISY's candidate for the 2008 presidential election.

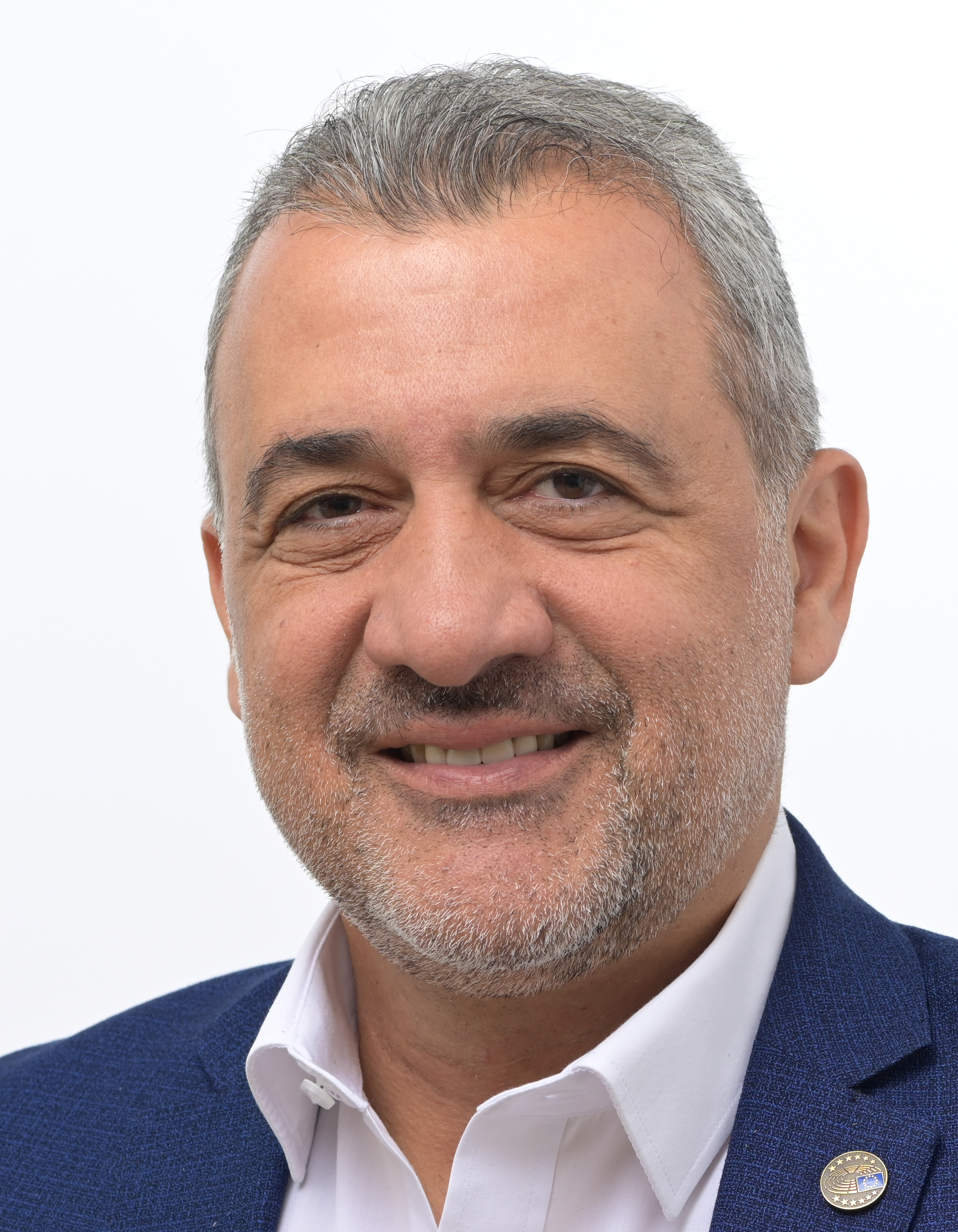
MEP Loukas Fourlas, DISY Member of the European Parliament since 2019.

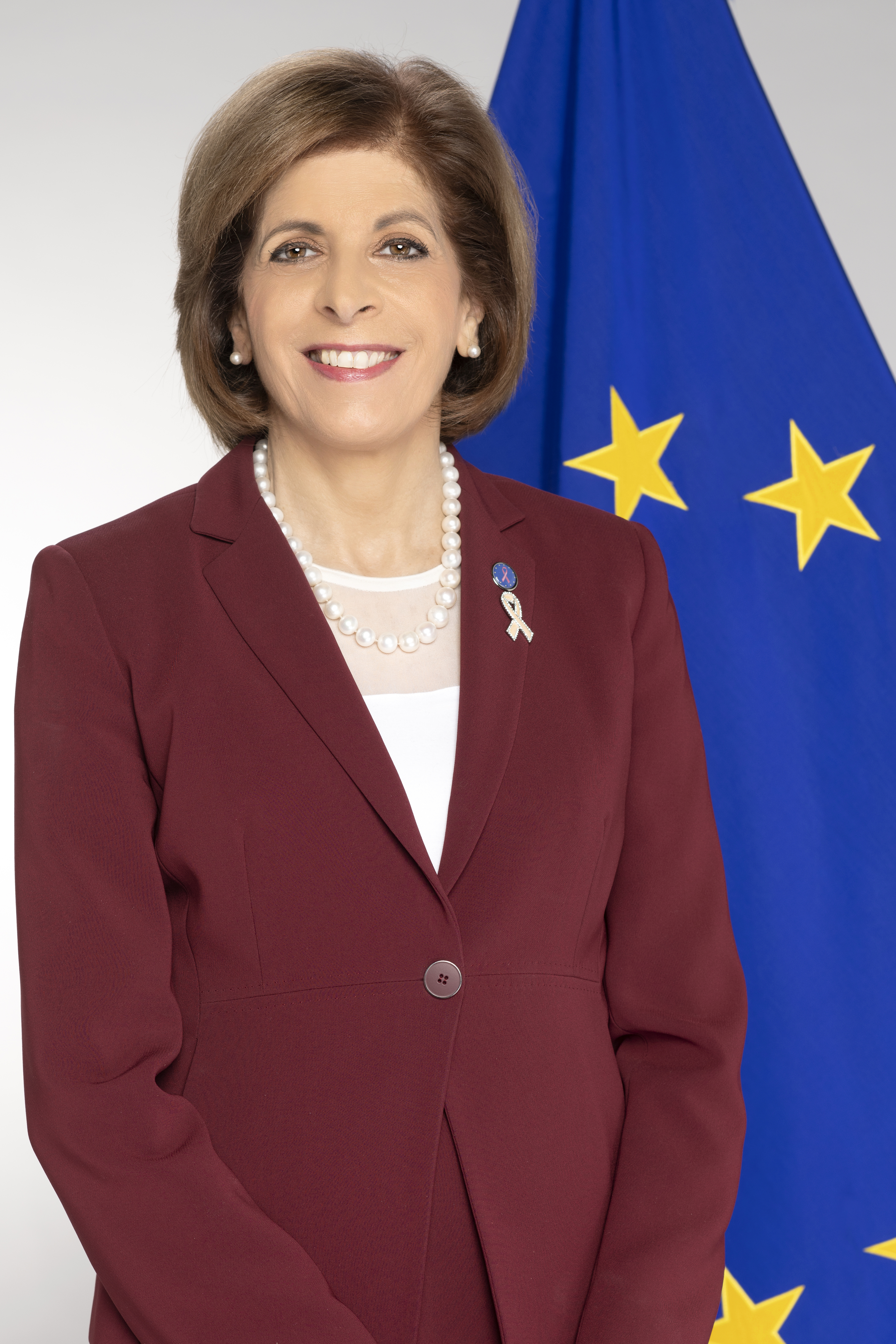
Stella Kyriakides, former DISY MP, former President of the Parliamentary Assembly of the Council of Europe (2017–2018) and former European Commissioner for Health and Food Safety (2019–2024).

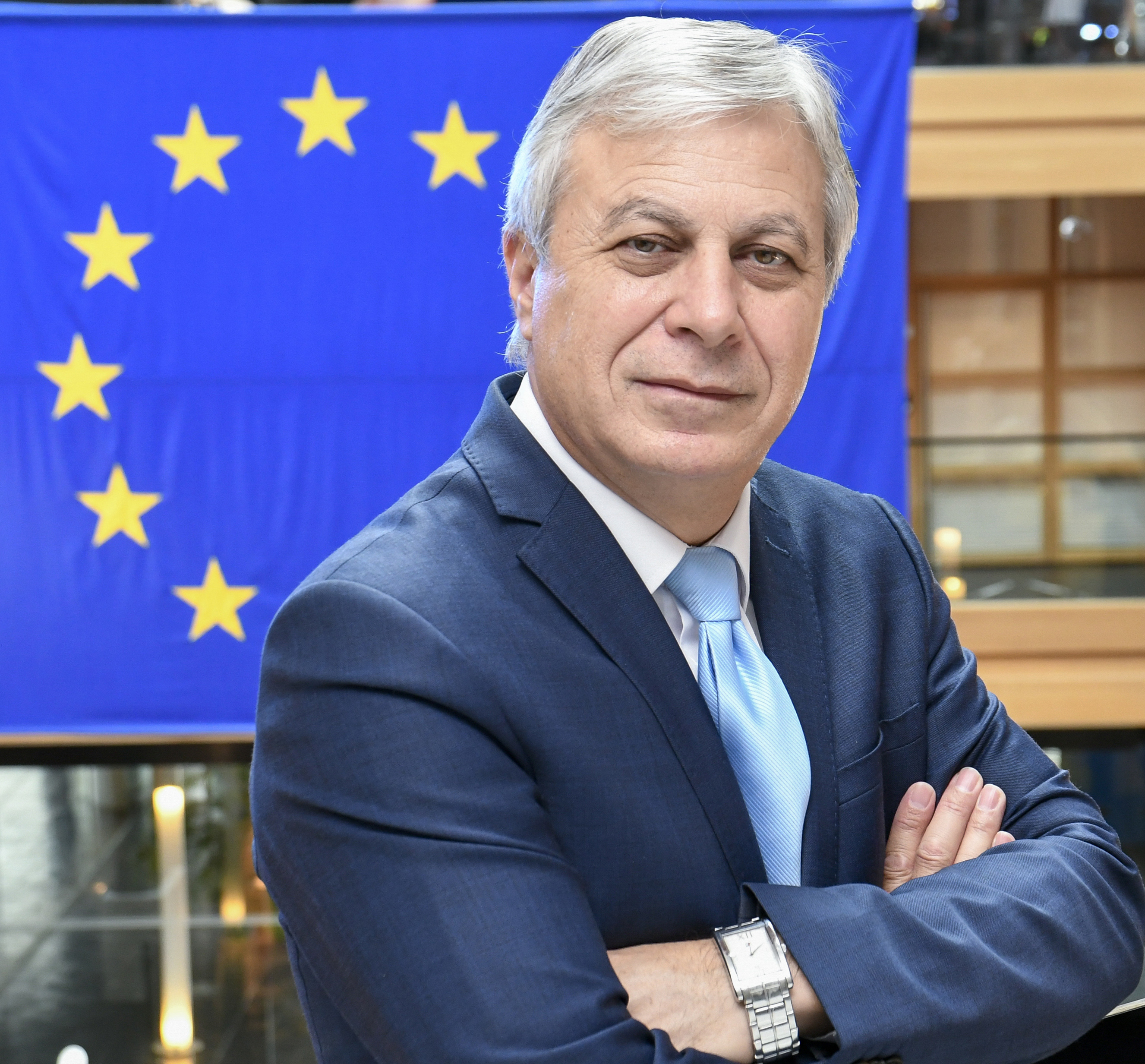
Lefteris Christoforou, former DISY MP (1996–2014) and MEP (2014–2022), Member of the European Court of Auditors (2022–present).

==== Notable Former Party Members ====
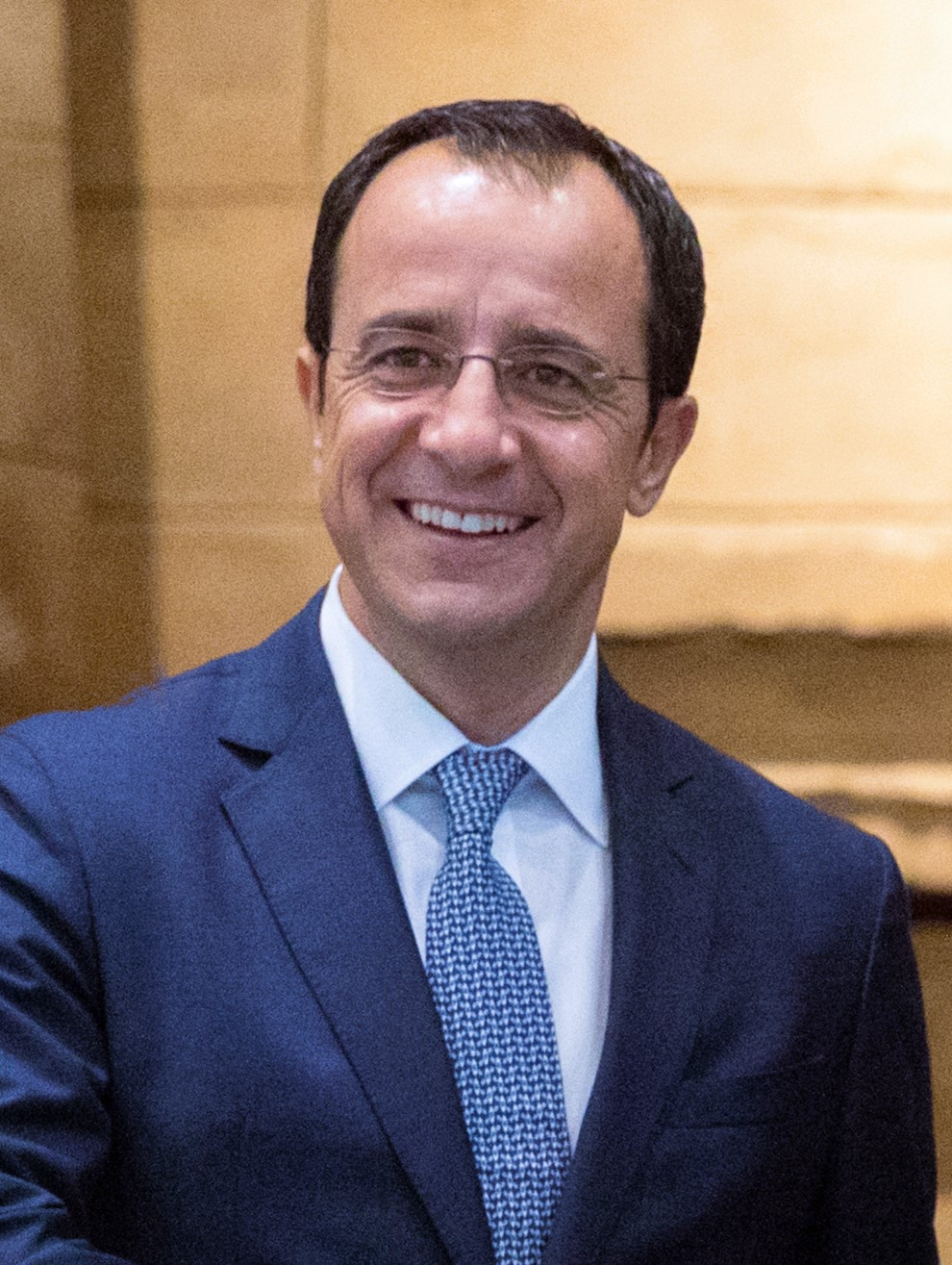
President Nikos Christodoulides, former Spokesman of Anastasiades' Government (2014–2018) and Minister of Foreign Affairs (2018–2022), and Independent President of Cyprus (2023–present)

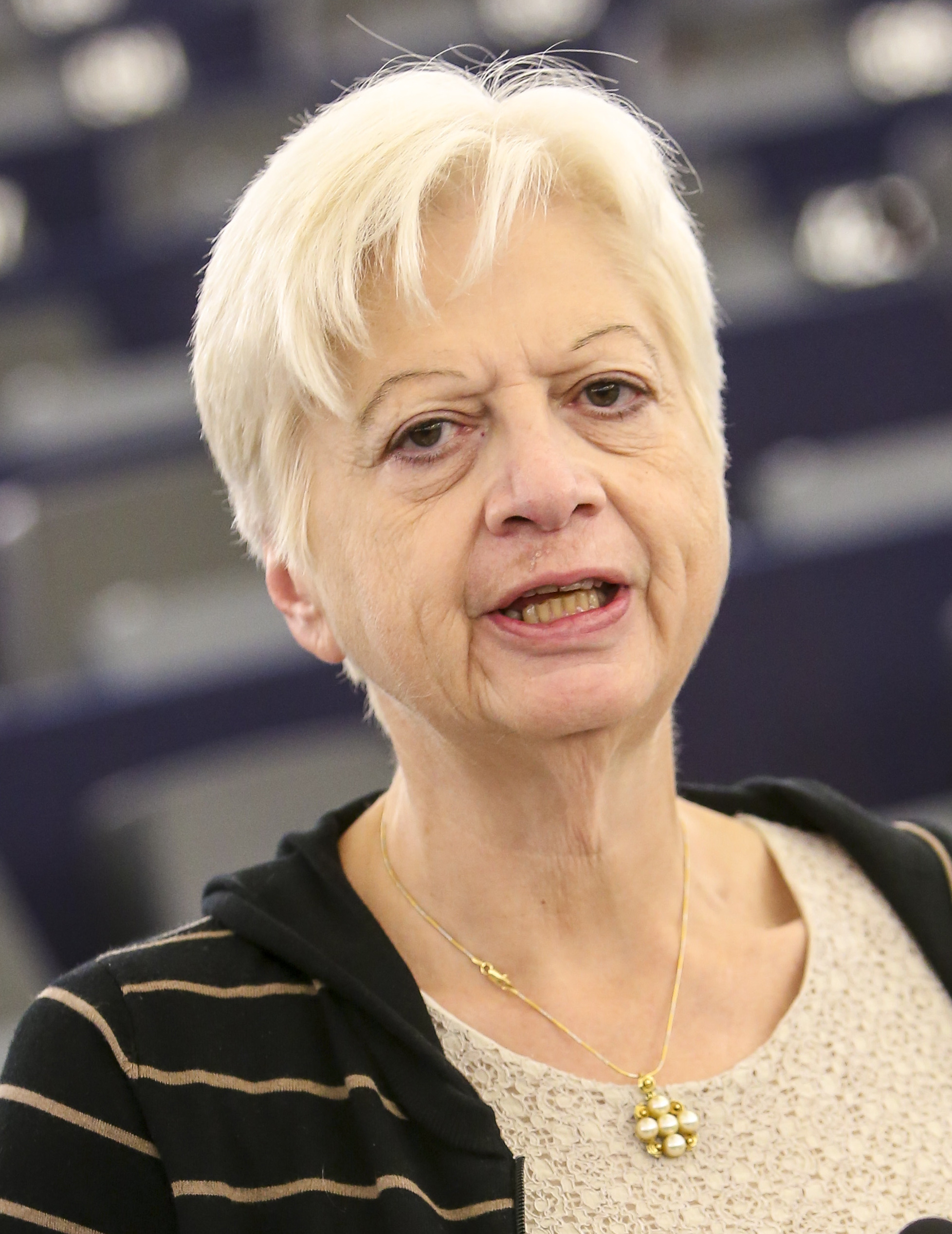
Eleni Theocharous, former DISY MP and MEP, founder of the DISY splinter party Solidarity Movement.

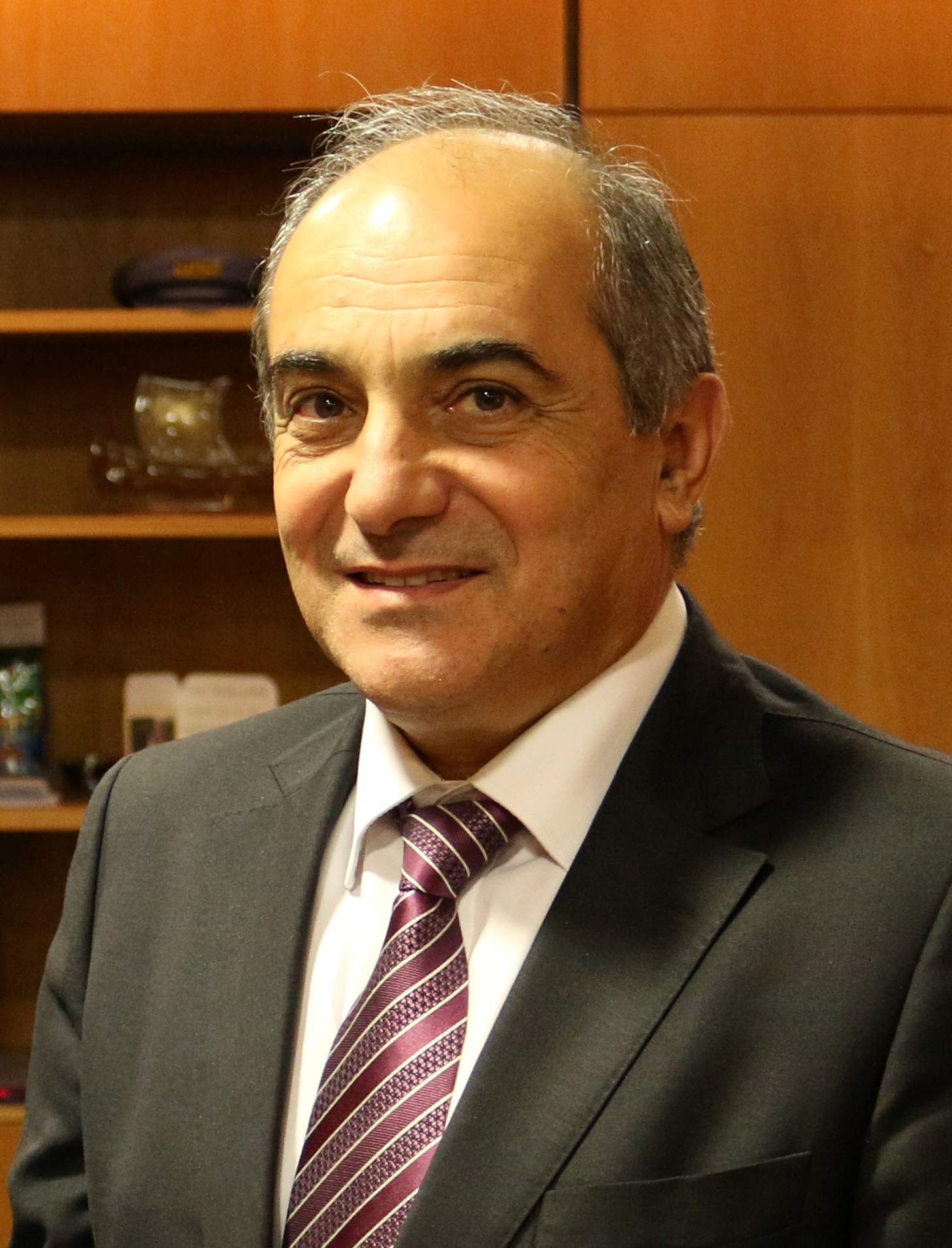
Demetris Syllouris, expelled DISY MP (2001–2004), president of the DISY splinter party EVROKO (2005–2016) and former President of the House of Representatives (2016–2020).

=== Progressive Party of Working People (AKEL) ===
The left-wing Progressive Party of Working People (AKEL) is the second largest political party in Cyprus, currently holding 15 of the 56 seats in the House of Representatives. It was founded in 1926 with the name "Communist Party of Cyprus" fighting against fascism, imperialism and chauvinism, but also aiming at the independence of Cyprus from British rule.

AKEL is a Marxist–Leninist, eurosceptic and communist party, classified as left-wing to far-left. It is currently led by MP Stefanos Stefanou and it is a member of The Left in the European Parliament. One party leader, Demetris Christofias, served as the President of Cyprus (2008–2013) for one term, without seeking re-election. Other presidents that were supported by AKEL were Archbishop Makarios III, Spyros Kyprianou, George Vassiliou and Tassos Papadopoulos.

==== Notable Figures ====
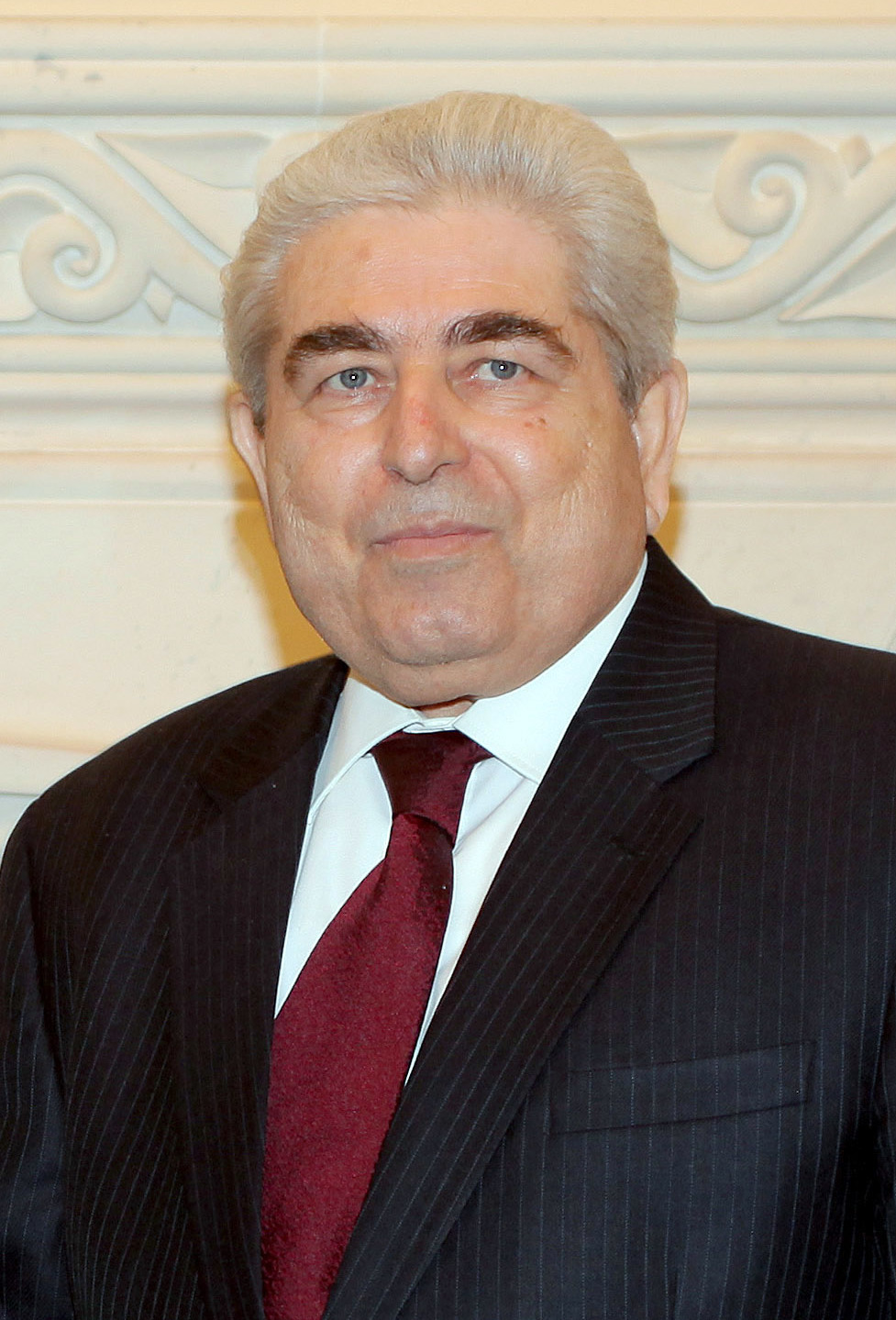
Demetris Christofias, former General Secretary of AKEL (1988–2009), President of the House of Representatives (2001–2008) and President of Cyprus (2008–2013).

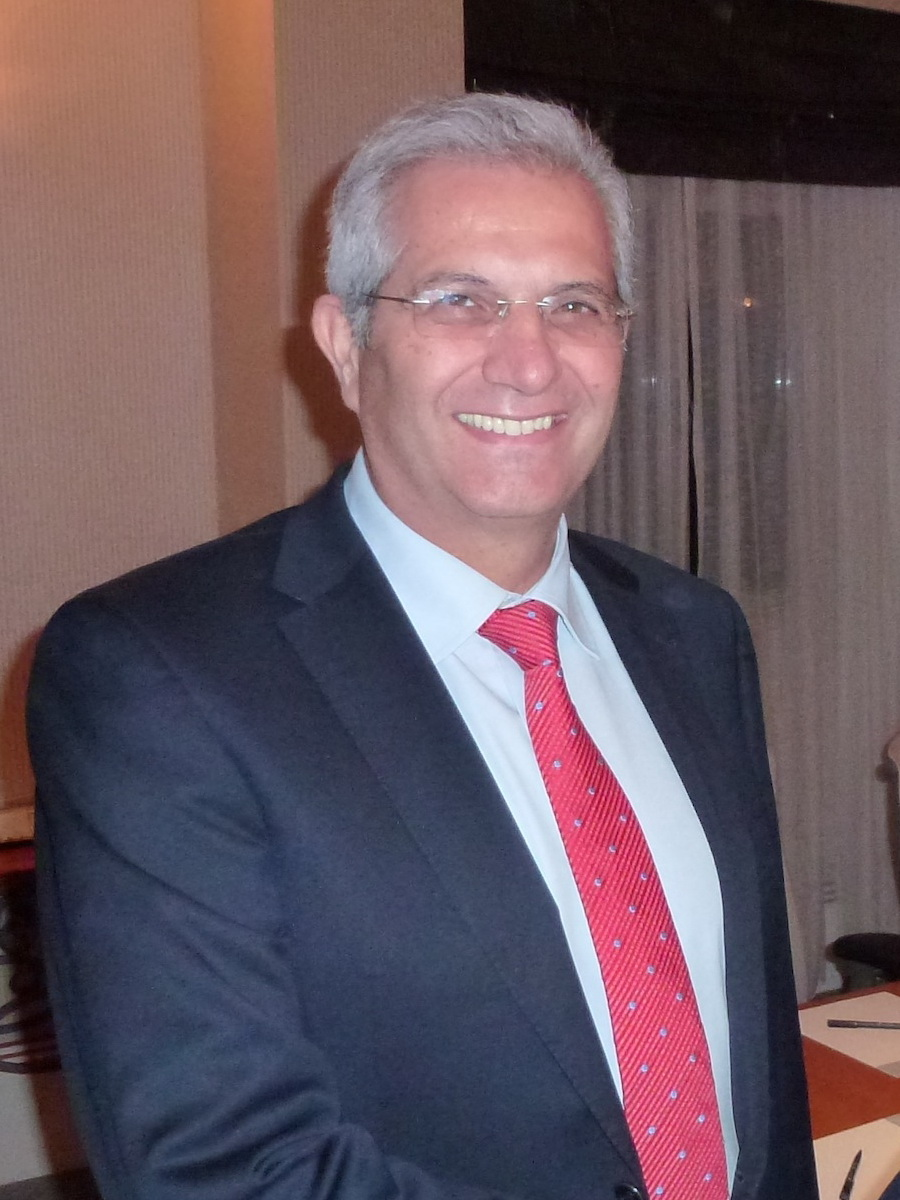
MP Andros Kyprianou, former General Secretary of AKEL (2009–2021).

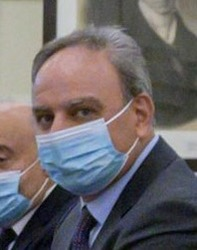
MP Stefanos Stefanou, General Secretary of AKEL since 2021.

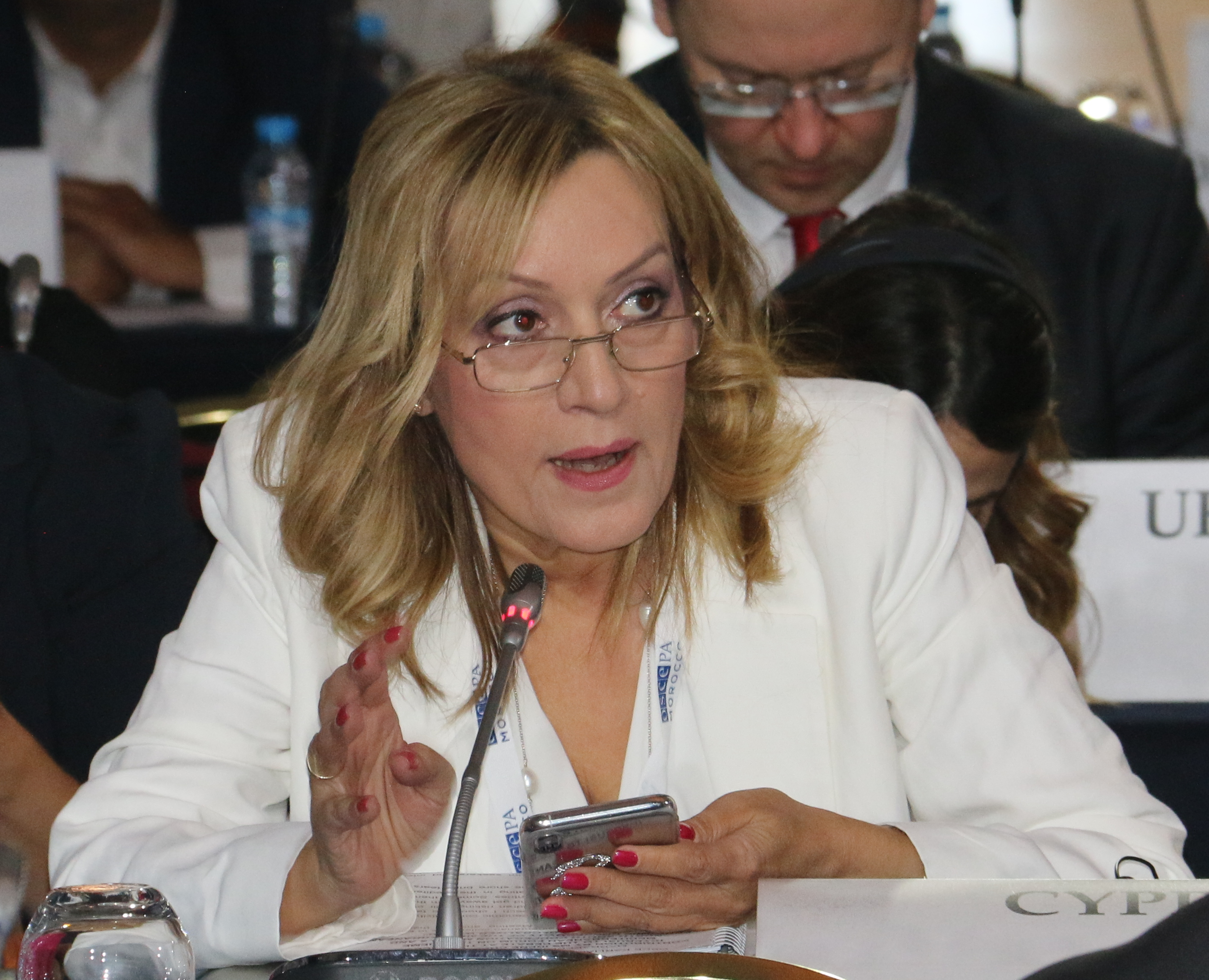
MP Irene Charalambidou, vice-president of the Parliamentary Assembly of the Organization for Security and Co-operation in Europe.

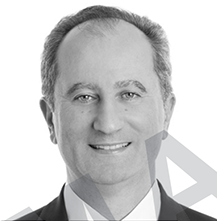
Stavros Malas, former Minister of Health (2011–2013) and AKEL-backed independent candidate in the 2013 and 2018 presidential elections.

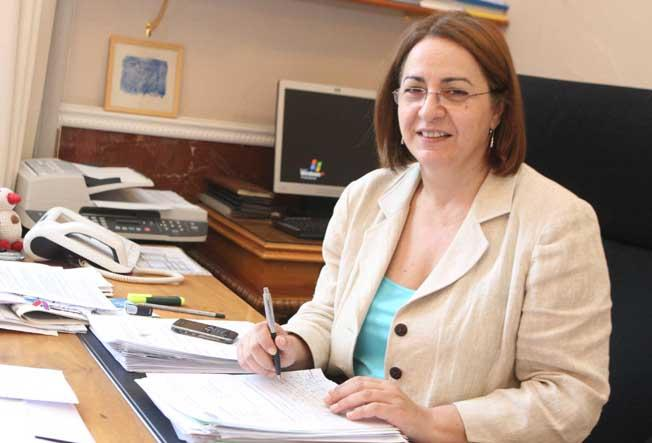
Eleni Mavrou, former AKEL MP (2001–2006), Minister of Interior (2012–2013) and Mayor of Nicosia (2007–2011).

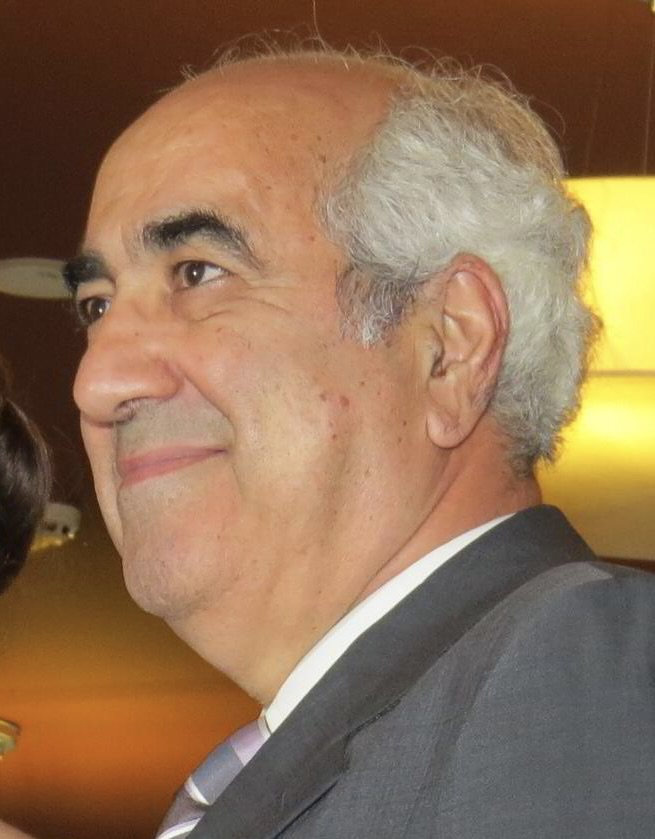
Andreas Christou, former AKEL MP (1991–2003), Interior Minister (2003–2006), Minister of Health (2004–2005) and Mayor of Limassol (2007–2016).

==== Notable Former Party Members ====
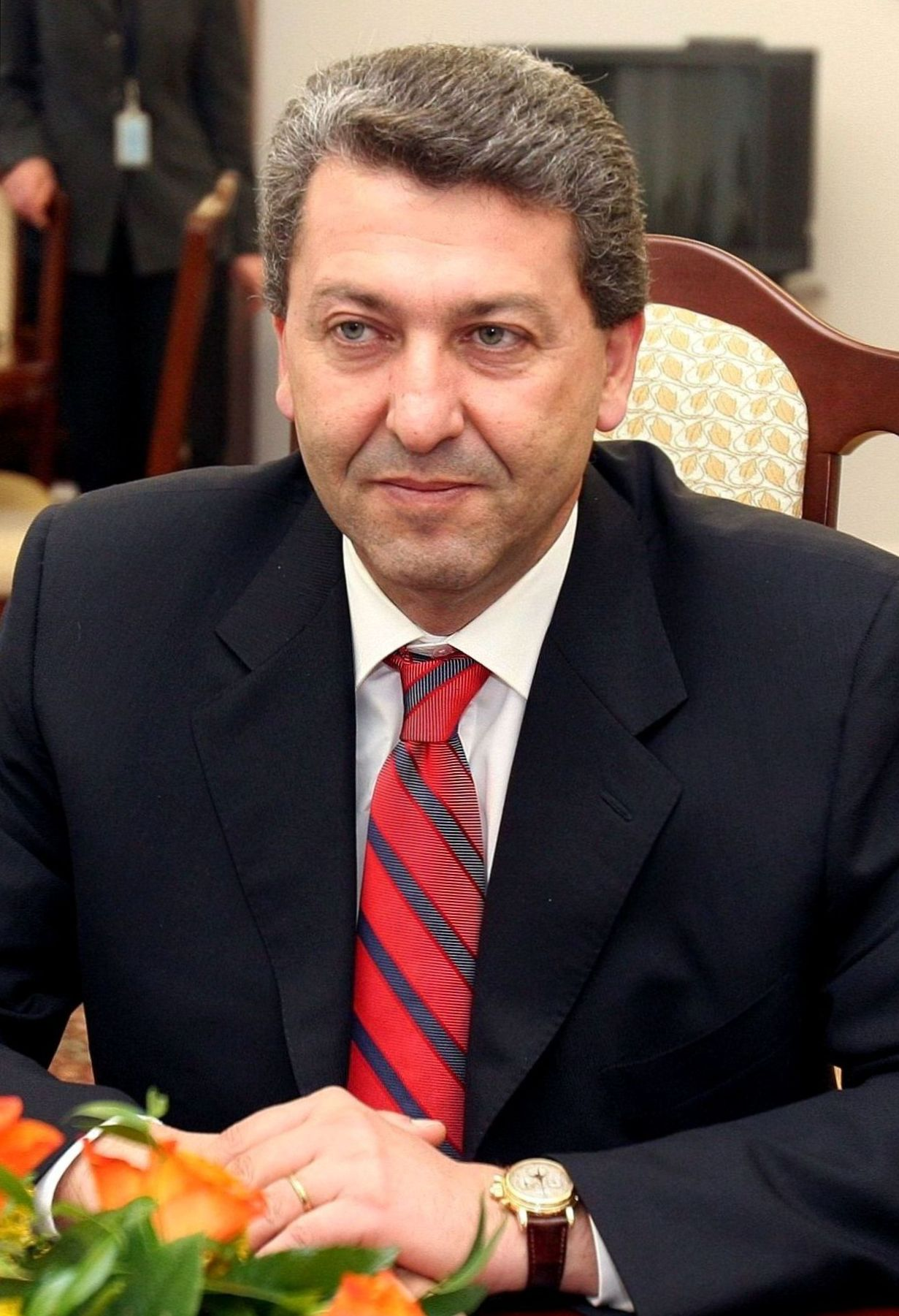
Giorgos Lillikas, former AKEL MP (1996–2003), founder of the splinter party Citizens' Alliance, and independent candidate at the 2013 Cypriot presidential election.

=== Democratic Party (DIKO) ===
DIKO is variously described as centrist, centre-left or centre-right; internationally, it is a member of the Progressive Alliance, which groups together mainly centre-left parties. DIKO claims to be the most loyal follower of the policies of Archbishop Makarios, the founding father of the Republic of Cyprus. It is currently led by Nikolas Papadopoulos, son of Tassos Papadopoulos, former President of Cyprus and of DIKO.

At its inception in 1976, DIKO maintained the right-wing ideology of its parent-party, Eniaion. However, in June 2003, under the leadership of Tassos Papadopoulos, DIKO announced a shift away from its traditional centre-right stance and declared an intention to move towards social democracy. The party has adopted a firm and hardline stance on the Cyprus problem, particularly in its strong opposition to the Annan Plan in 2004. While DIKO supports European integration and advocates a non-aligned foreign policy, it has also expressed support for Cyprus joining NATO's Partnership for Peace.

Two former leaders of the party have served as Presidents of Cyprus, Spyros Kyprianou (1977–1988) and Tassos Papadopoulos (2003–2008). The current President of Cyprus, Nikos Christodoulides, although running as an independent, was supported by DIKO, making the party the largest in the current government.

Internal disagreements over the Cyprus problem led to the creation of the splinter party Democratic Alignment (DIPA), in 2018, led by the former president of DIKO, Marios Garoyian.

==== Notable Figures ====
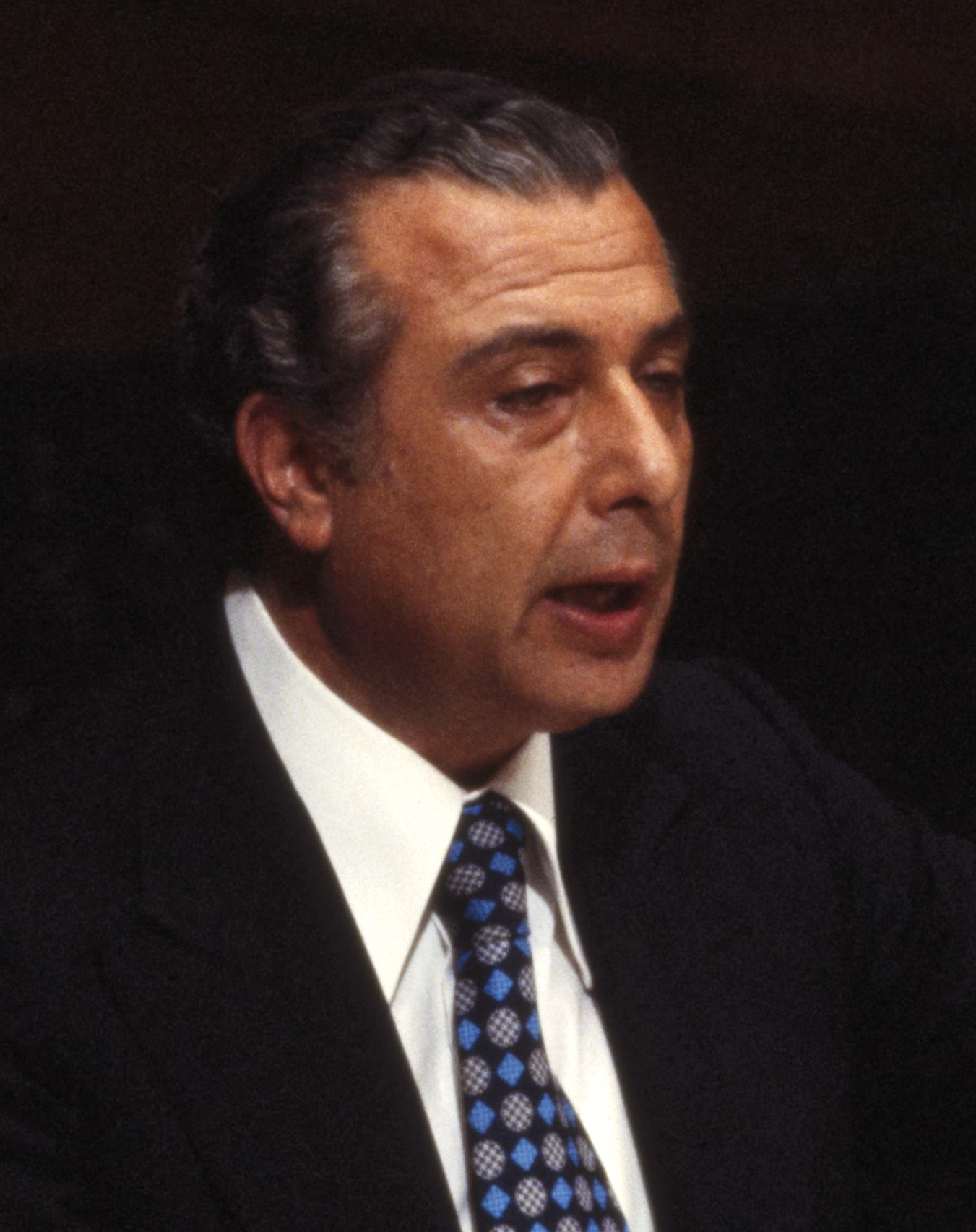
Spyros Kyprianou, former President of DIKO (1976–2000), President of the House of Representatives (1976–1977, 1996–2001) and President of Cyprus (1977–1988).

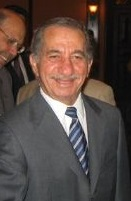
Tassos Papadopoulos, former President of DIKO (200–2006), President of the House of Representatives (1976) and President of Cyprus (2003–2008).

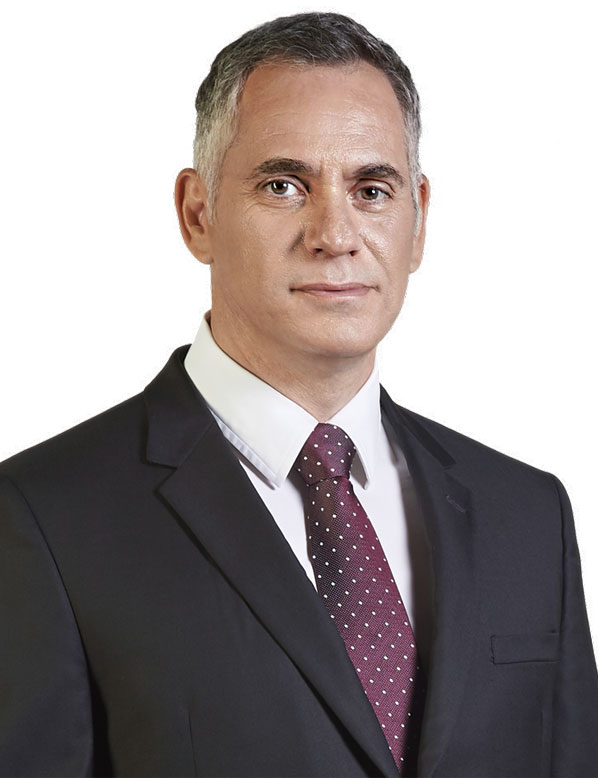
MP Nikolas Papadopoulos, President of DIKO since 2013 and DIKO's candidate in the 2018 presidential election.

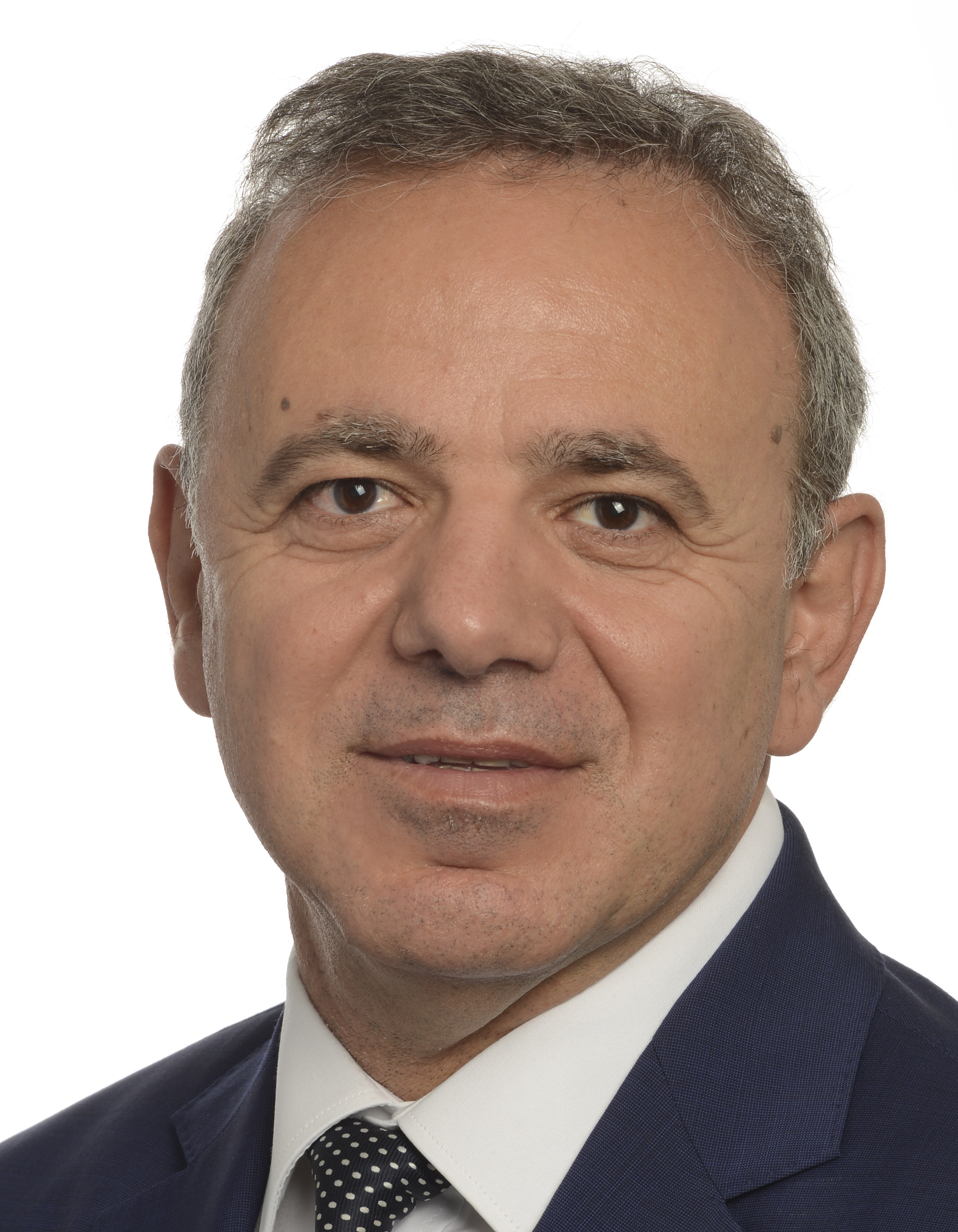
MEP Costas Mavrides, DIKO's Member of the European Parliament since 2014.

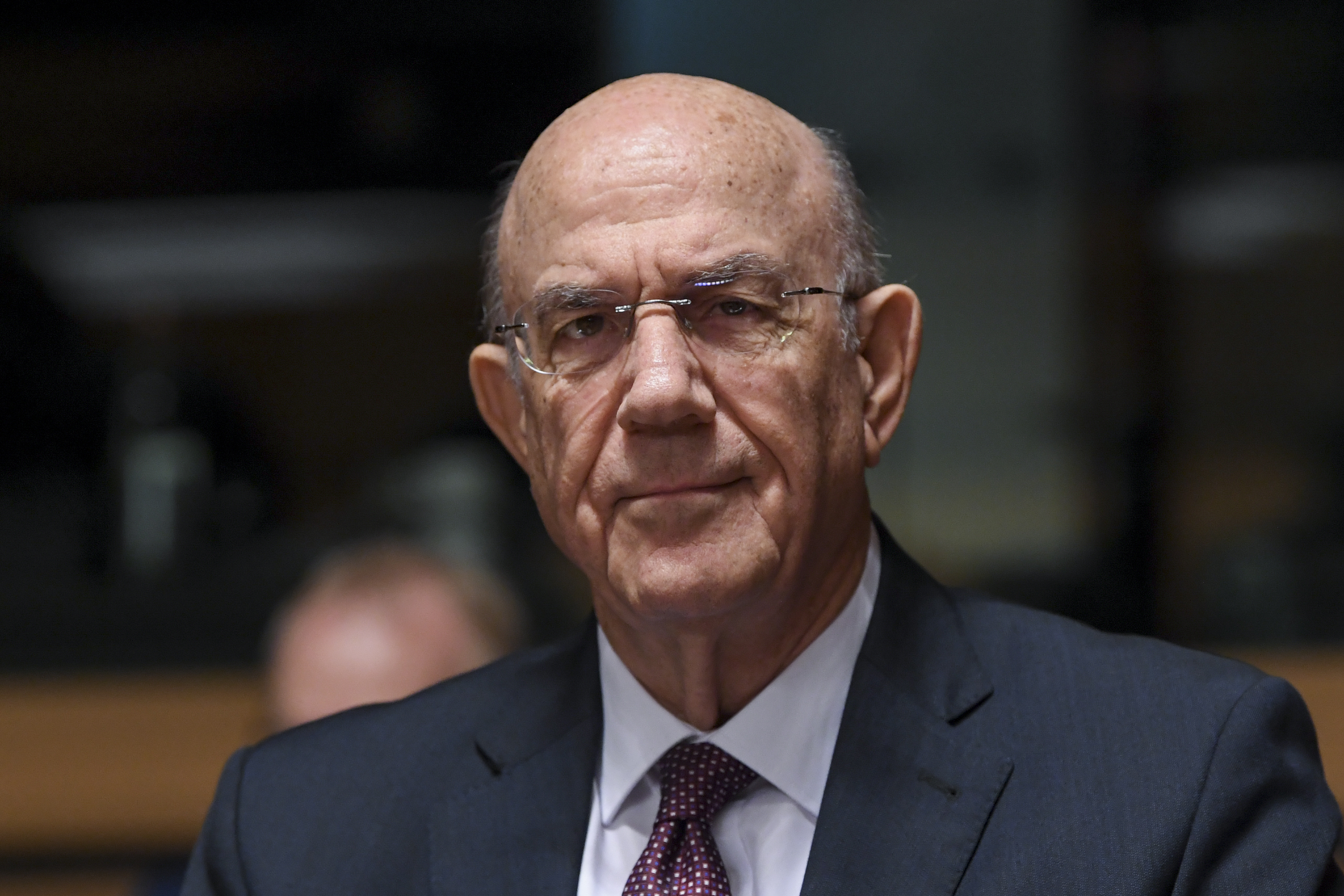
Makis Keravnos, member of DIKO, former Minister of Labor and Social Security (2003–2004), and Minister of Finance since 2023.

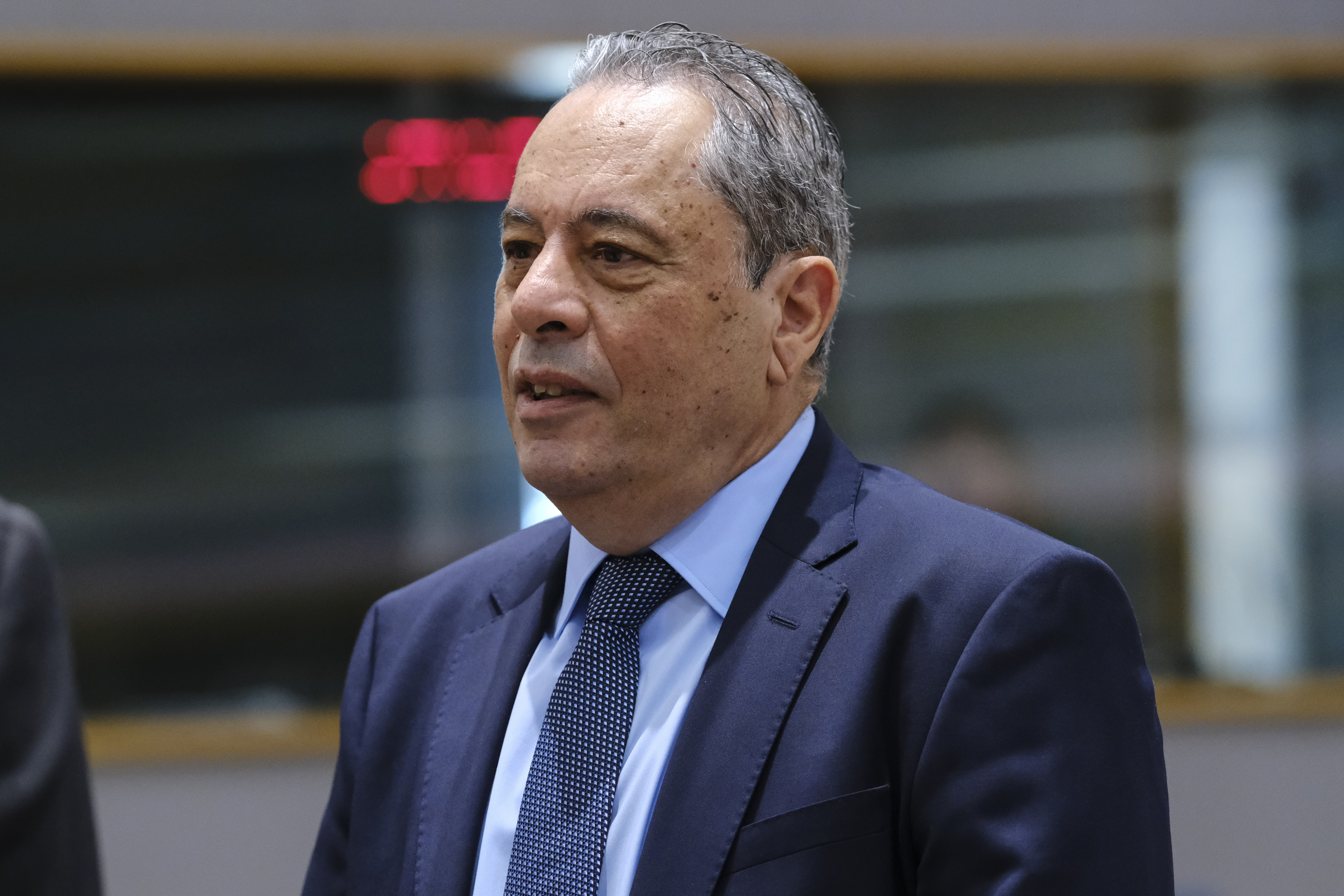
Vasilis Palmas, member of DIKO, former Government Spokesperson (2007–2008), Deputy Minister to the President (2017–2022), and Minister of Defence since 2024.

=== United Democratic Union of Centre (EDEK) ===
The EDEK Socialist Party, officially the Movement for Social Democracy, is a progressive centre, social-democratic party in Cyprus founded in 1969 by Vassos Lyssaridis with strong anti-imperialist and Greek-Cypriot nationalist roots.

In 2000 the party presintency passed to Yiannakis Omirou. The party involved itself to the EU parliament elections, notably with Kyriakos Mavronikolas.

Two former leaders of the party have served as president of the Cypriot parliament, Dr Vassos Lyssaridis (1985-1991) and Yiannakis Omirou (2011-2016).

==== Notable Figures ====
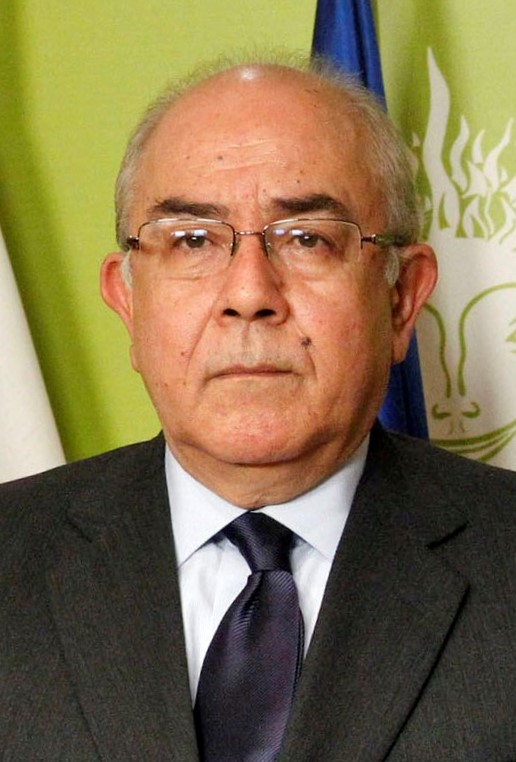
Yiannakis Omirou, former President of EDEK (2000–2015), President of the House of Representatives (2011-2011). Also and Minister of Defence 1998-1999.

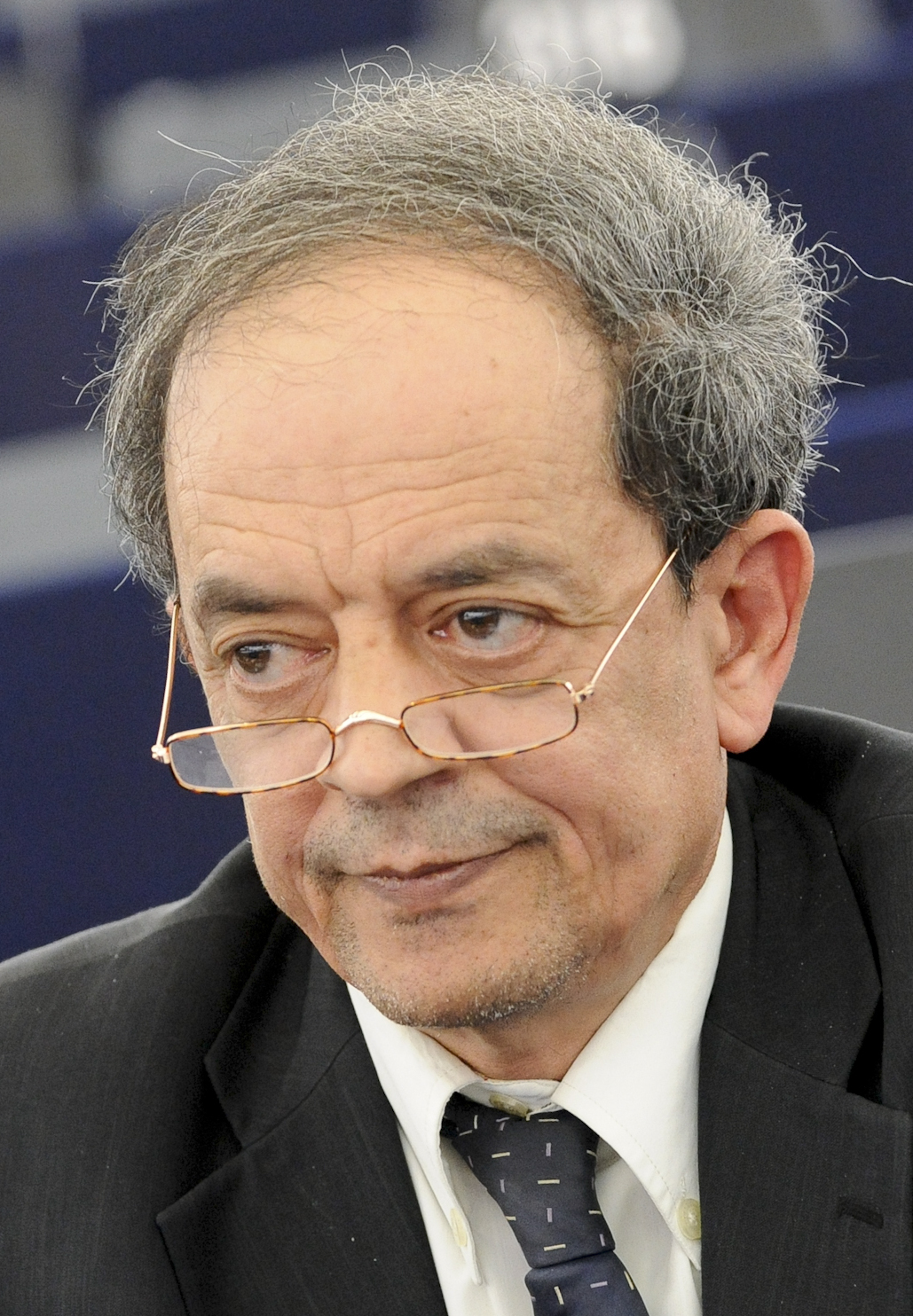
MEP Kyriakos Mavronikolas, EDEK Member of the European Parliament 2009-2014 and Minister of Defence 2004-2006.

== Latest elections ==
=== President ===
Candidate	Party	First round		Second round	
Candidate	Party	Votes	%	Votes	%
Nikos Christodoulides	Independent (Note: Supported by DIKO, EDEK, DIPA, Solidarity, Active Citizens – United Cypriot Hunters Movement and Animal Party Cyprus)	127,309	32.04	204,867	51.97
Andreas Mavroyiannis	Independent (Note: Supported by AKEL and Generation Change)	117,551	29.59	189,335	48.03
Averof Neofytou	Democratic Rally	103,748	26.11		
Christos Christou	National Popular Front	23,988	6.04		
Achilleas Dimitriades	Independent (Note: Supported by Famagusta for Cyprus)	8,137	2.05		
Constantinos Christofides	New Wave – The Other Cyprus	6,326	1.59		
Georgios Colocassides	Independent	5,287	1.33		
Alexios Savvides	Independent	2,395	0.60		
Charalampos Aristotelous	Independent	866	0.22		
Celestina de Petro	Independent	575	0.14		
Andronicos Zervides	Independent	341	0.09		
Ioulia Khovrina Komninou	United Cyprus Republican Party	330	0.08		
Andreas Efstratiou	Independent	299	0.08		
Loukas Stavrou	National Communitarian Reconstruction	165	0.04		
Total		397,317	100.00	394,202	100.00
Valid votes		397,317	98.27	394,202	96.95
Invalid votes		5,333	1.32	8,428	2.07
Blank votes		1,671	0.41	3,986	0.98
Total votes		404,321	100.00	406,616	100.00
Registered voters/turnout		561,273	72.04	561,273	72.45
Source: Central Electoral Service, Central Electoral Service

=== Parliament ===
Party	Votes	%	Seats	+/–
Democratic Rally	101,013	27.15	17	0
Progressive Party of Working People	88,777	23.86	15	0
National People's Front	40,567	10.90	8	+4
Democratic Party	37,222	10.00	8	–1
ALMA – Citizens for Cyprus	21,700	5.83	4	New
Direct Democracy Cyprus	20,159	5.42	4	New
EDEK Socialist Party	12,099	3.25	0	–4
Active Citizens – Movement of Cypriot United Hunters	11,890	3.20	0	0
Democratic Alignment	11,693	3.14	0	–4
Volt Cyprus	11,487	3.09	0	New
Movement of Ecologists – Citizens' Cooperation	7,264	1.95	0	–3
Democratic National Movement	2,628	0.71	0	New
Stand Up	1,897	0.51	0	New
Agronómos Agricultural Labour Party	1,044	0.28	0	New
Democratic Change	1,020	0.27	0	New
Green Party of Cyprus	509	0.14	0	New
Patriotic Front "Lacedaemonians"	494	0.13	0	New
Far-Left Resistance Communism	39	0.01	0	New
People's Struggle for Freedom	33	0.01	0	New
Independents	525	0.14	0	0
Total	372,060	100.00	56	0
Valid votes	372,060	97.69		
Invalid votes	6,621	1.74		
Blank votes	2,170	0.57		
Total votes	380,851	100.00		
Registered voters/turnout	569,182	66.91		
Source: Central Elections Service

=== European ===
Party	Votes	%	Seats	+/–
Democratic Rally	91,316	24.78	2	0
Progressive Party of Working People	79,163	21.49	1	–1
Independent – Fidias Panayiotou	71,330	19.36	1	New
National Popular Front	41,215	11.19	1	+1
Democratic Party	35,815	9.72	1	0
EDEK Socialist Party	18,681	5.07	0	–1
Volt Cyprus	10,777	2.92	0	0
Democratic Alignment	7,988	2.17	0	0
Movement of Ecologists – Citizens' Cooperation	4,742	1.29	0	New
Movement of Cypriot United Hunters	4,603	1.25	0	New
Animal Party Cyprus	1,013	0.27	0	0
National Action Movement	979	0.27	0	New
Independent – Andronikos Zervides	444	0.12	0	New
Victory Movement	389	0.11	0	New
Total	368,455	100.00	6	0
Source: https://live.elections.moi.gov.cy/

== Political pressure groups and leaders ==
1. Cypriot Workers Union (Greek: Συνομοσπονδία Εργατών Κύπρου (Σ.Ε.Κ.))
2. Union of Cypriots (Greek: Ένωσις Κυπρίων; Turkish: Kıbrıslılar Birliği)
3. Revolutionary Trade Unions Federation (DEV-İŞ)
4. Pan-Cyprian Labour Federation or PEO (Greek: Παγκύπρια Εργατική Ομοσπονδία (Π.Ε.Ο.))
5. Eleftheria Citizens Initiative (Greek: Πρωτοβουλία Πολιτών Ελευθερία)

== Administrative divisions ==
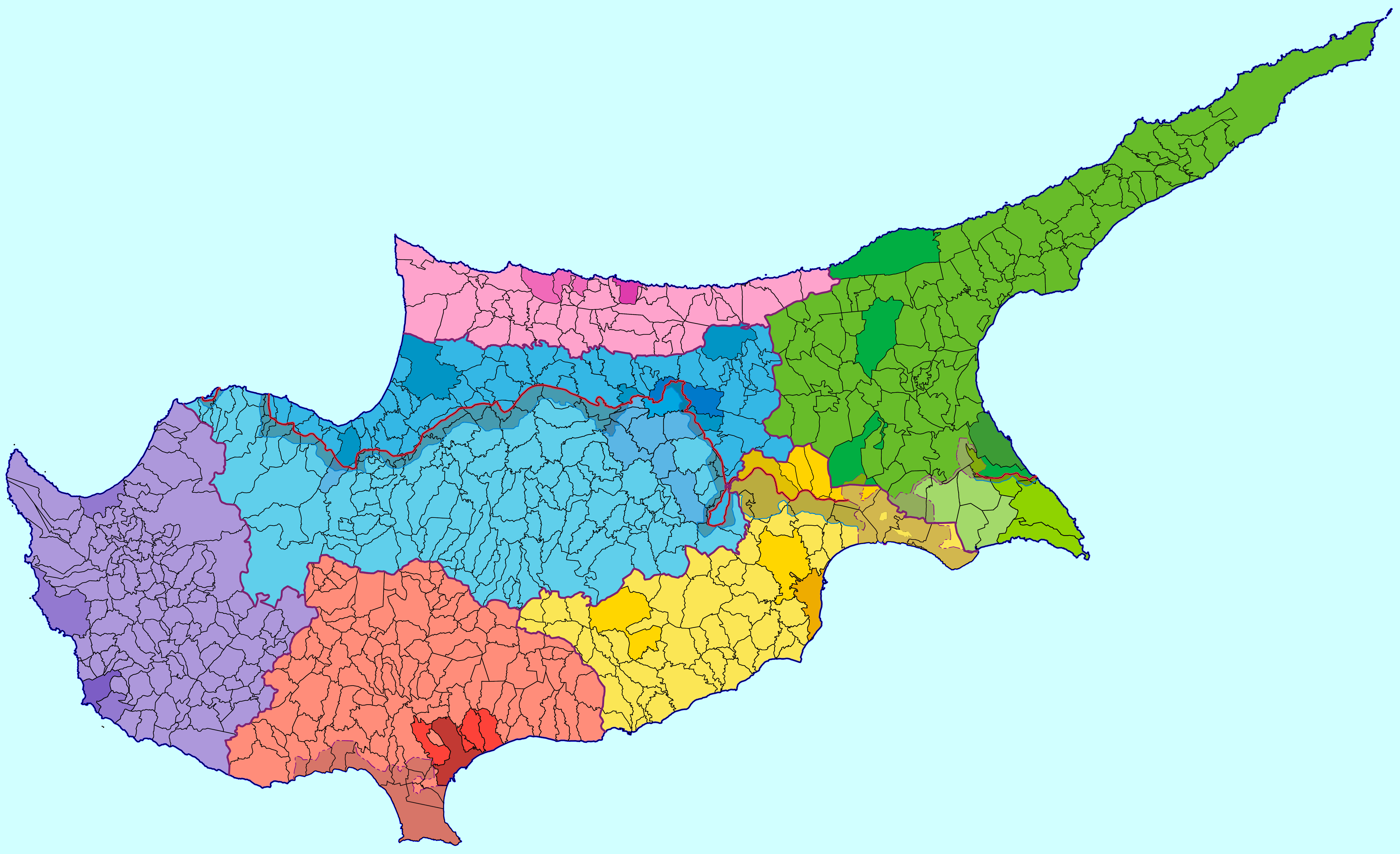
Map of the Districts in Cyprus

The island is divided into 6 administrative divisions: Nicosia (Lefkosia), Limassol (Lemesos), Larnaca, Paphos, Famagusta (Ammochostos), and Kyrenia. (Note: Occupied area's administrative divisions include Kyrenia, all but a small part of Famagusta (Ammochostos), and small parts of Lefkosia (Nicosia) and Larnaca.)

== Exclaves and enclaves ==
Cyprus has four exclaves, all in territory that belongs to the British Sovereign Base Area of Dhekelia. The first two are the villages of Ormidhia and Xylotymvou. Additionally there is the Dhekelia Power Station, which is divided by a British road into two parts. The northern part is an enclave, like the two villages, whereas the southern part is located by the sea and therefore not an enclave —although it has no territorial waters of its own.

The UN buffer zone separating the territory controlled by the Turkish Cypriot administration from the rest of Cyprus runs up against Dhekelia and picks up again from its east side, off of Ayios Nikolaos (connected to the rest of Dhekelia by a thin land corridor). In that sense, the buffer zone turns the south-east corner of the island, the Paralimni area, into a de facto, though not de jure, exclave.

== See also ==
- Cyprus
- Northern Cyprus
- List of ministers of communications and works of Cyprus
- List of ministers of labour and social insurance of Cyprus
- Corruption in Cyprus
