= Cyprus (European Parliament constituency) =

Constituency of the European Parliament

- European Parliament constituency
- Location among the current constituencies
- Member state: Cyprus
- Created: 2004
- MEPs: 6 (2004–present)

Cyprus is a European Parliament constituency for elections in the European Union covering the member state of Cyprus. It is currently represented by six Members of the European Parliament.

== Members of the European Parliament ==
Election	MEP (party)	MEP (party)	MEP (party)	MEP (party)	MEP (party)	MEP (party)
2004	Marios Matsakis (DIKO)	Panayiotis Demetriou (DISY)	Ioannis Kasoulides (DISY)	Yiannakis Matsis (EvroDi)	Adamos Adamou (AKEL)	Kyriacos Triantaphyllides (AKEL)
2009	Antigoni Papadopoulou (DIKO)	Eleni Theocharous (DISY) (Later defected to the Solidarity Movement)	Ioannis Kasoulides (DISY)	Kyriakos Mavronikolas (EDEK)	Takis Hadjigeorgiou (AKEL)	Kyriacos Triantaphyllides (AKEL)
2012	Antigoni Papadopoulou (DIKO)	Eleni Theocharous (DISY) (Later defected to the Solidarity Movement)	Ioannis Kasoulides (DISY)	Sophocles Sophocleous (EDEK)	Takis Hadjigeorgiou (AKEL)	Kyriacos Triantaphyllides (AKEL)
2013	Antigoni Papadopoulou (DIKO)	Eleni Theocharous (DISY) (Later defected to the Solidarity Movement)	Andreas Pitsillides (DISY)	Sophocles Sophocleous (EDEK)	Takis Hadjigeorgiou (AKEL)	Kyriacos Triantaphyllides (AKEL)
2014	Costas Mavrides (DIKO)	Eleni Theocharous (DISY) (Later defected to the Solidarity Movement)	Lefteris Christoforou (DISY)	Dimitris Papadakis (EDEK)	Takis Hadjigeorgiou (AKEL)	Neoklis Sylikiotis (AKEL)
2019	Costas Mavrides (DIKO)	Loukas Fourlas (DISY)	Lefteris Christoforou (DISY)	Dimitris Papadakis (EDEK)	Niyazi Kızılyürek (AKEL)	Giorgos Georgiou (AKEL)
2022	Costas Mavrides (DIKO)	Loukas Fourlas (DISY)	Eleni Stavrou (DISY)	Dimitris Papadakis (EDEK)	Niyazi Kızılyürek (AKEL)	Giorgos Georgiou (AKEL)
2024	Costas Mavrides (DIKO)	Loukas Fourlas (DISY)	Michalis Hatzipantelas (DISY)	Geadis Geadi (ELAM)	Fidias Panayiotou (IND)	Giorgos Georgiou (AKEL)

== Elections ==
=== 2004 ===
The 2004 European election was the sixth election to the European Parliament. However, as Cyprus had only joined the European Union earlier that month, it was the first election European election held in that state. The election took place on 13 June 2004.

The number of registered voters was 483,311 – out of which 503 were Turkish Cypriots and 2054 EU nationals – while the total number of people who voted was 350.387 or 72.50% of the registered voters. The number of polling stations was 1077, allocated to each polling district in the following manner: Nicosia 416, Limassol 323, Famagusta (free area) 50, Larnaca 169 and Paphos 119.

The six seats were contested by 59 candidates, belonging to parties or party coalitions or running as individuals. The conservative Democratic Rally and the left-wing Progressive Party of Working People (AKEL) achieved the largest shares of the vote.

=== 2009 ===
The 2009 European election was the seventh election to the European Parliament and the second for Cyprus.

=== 2014 ===
The 2014 European election was the eighth election to the European Parliament and the third for Cyprus.

=== 2019 ===
The 2019 European election was the ninth election to the European Parliament and the fourth for Cyprus.

=== 2024 ===
The 2024 European election was the tenth election to the European Parliament and the fifth for Cyprus.
