= Sophocles Sophocleous =

Cypriot politician

Sophocles Sophocleous MEP
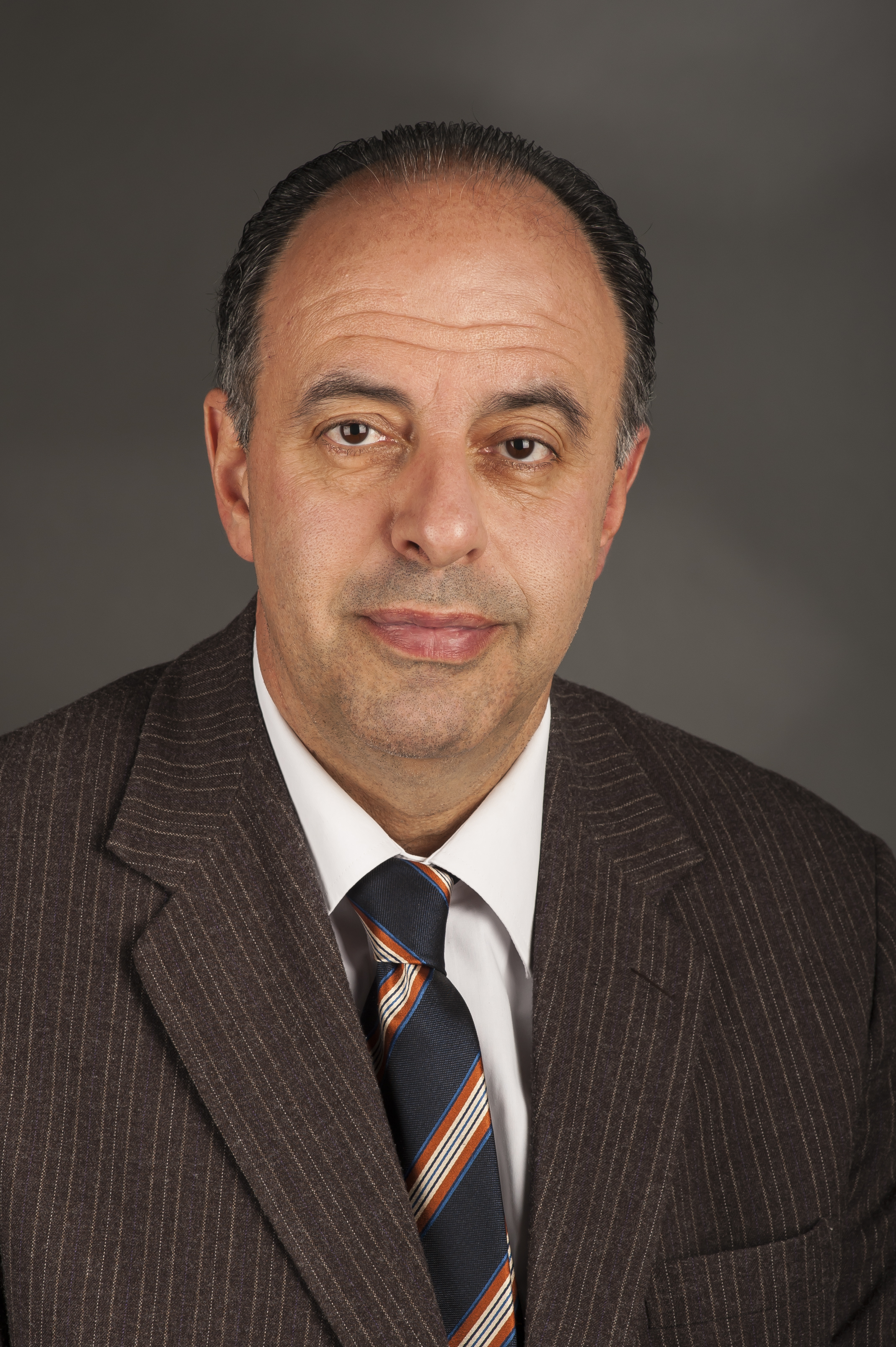

Member of the European Parliament for Cyprus
- In office 1 September 2012 – 30 June 2014

Personal details
- Born: 7 August 1962 (age 64) Pano Lefkara, Cyprus
- Party: Movement for Social Democracy
- Education: Aristotle University of Thessaloniki

Sophocles Sophocleous (born 7 August 1962) is a Cypriot Movement for Social Democracy politician. He sat as a Member of the European Parliament for Cyprus between 2012 and 2014. He was the Cypriot Minister of Justice and Public Order from 2006 to 2008. He is the current mayor of Lefkara, his hometown.

Sophocleous is a law graduate of the Aristotle University of Thessaloniki. He was the mayor of Pano Lefkara, his hometown, from 1992 to 2006, and he was the vice-president of the Movement for Social Democracy from 2000 to 2012. He was appointed Minister of Justice and Public Order in 2006, and he stayed in post until Tassos Papadopoulos lost the Cypriot presidency at the 2008 presidential election. Sophocleous took the seat of Kyriakos Mavronikolas in the European Parliament following the latter's resignation in 2012.
