= Pano Lefkara =

Pano Lefkara Λεύκαρα (Greek)
- Municipality
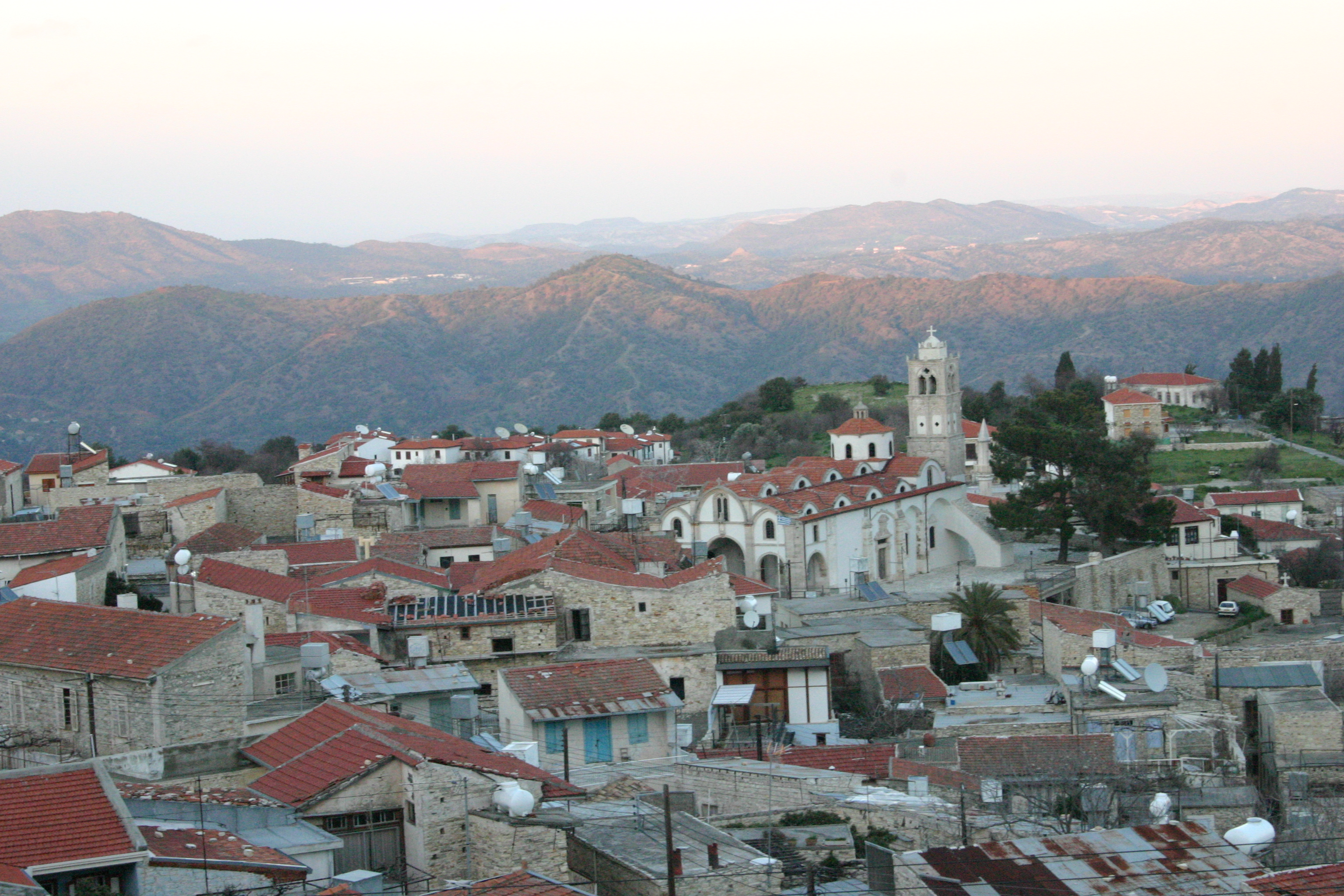

- Location within Cyprus
- Coordinates: 34°52′N 33°18′E
- Country: Cyprus
- District: Larnaca District

Government
  - Mayor: Sophocles Sophocleous
- Elevation: 500 m (1,600 ft)

Population (2021)
  - Total: 868
- Time zone: UTC+2 (EET)
  - Summer (DST): UTC+3 (EEST)
- Postal code: 7710
- Website: http://www.lefkara.org.cy/

Pano Lefkara (Greek: Πάνω Λεύκαρα) is a village on the island of Cyprus famous for its lace, known as lefkaritika in (Greek: λευκαρίτικα) and silver handicrafts. The village takes its name from the white of its silica and limestone: Lefkara is derived from a combination of the Greek words "lefka" (Greek: λευκά, Translation: white) and "ori" (Greek: όρη, Translation: mountains, hills). Pano means upper as there is also Kato Lefkara, whereby Kato means lower. Kato Lefkara is a separate village which sits below Pano Lefkar.

== Location ==
The village is located on the southern slopes of the Troodos Mountains in the Larnaca District of Cyprus, off the main Nicosia-Limassol highway. It features cobbled limestone streets. It is approximately 1.2 km (0.75 mi) from Kato Lefkara.

== Silver and lace ==
Groups of women sit in the narrow village streets and work on their fine embroidery, as they have for centuries. The village is also known for its skilled silversmiths who produce fine filigree work. A folklore museum in the town displays what life was like in Cyprus about hundred years ago. The museum is located in a restored house and exhibits the furniture and effects of a wealthy family, local costumes and examples of the Lefkara lacework. According to legend, Leonardo da Vinci visited the village in 1481, and purchased a lace cloth for the main altar of Milan Cathedral. In 1889 a local lace school was opened, and Pano Lefkara lace regained much of its ancient renown.

== Historical overview ==
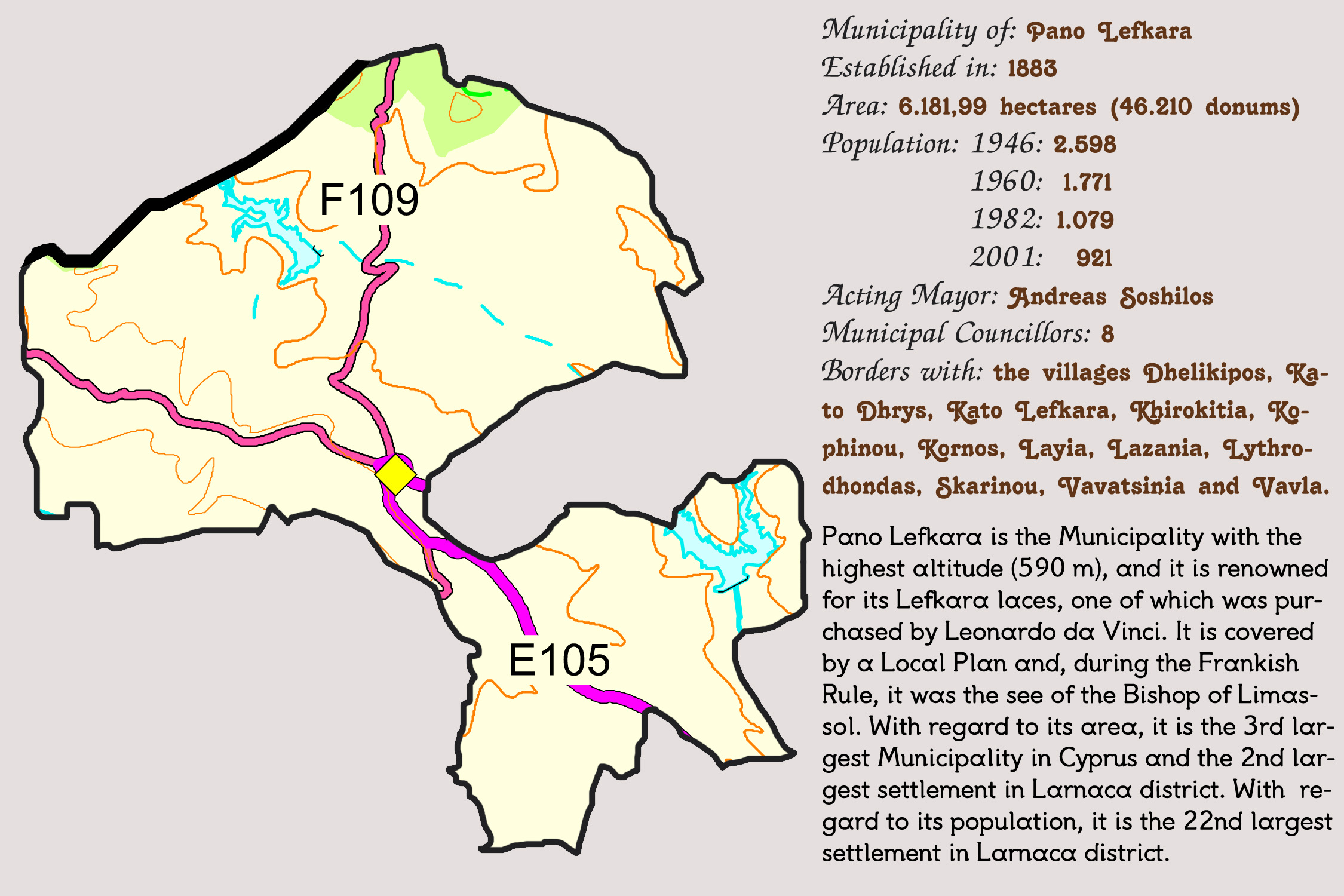
Concise presentation of Pano Lefkara

=== Antiquity to the end of the Ottoman period ===
The Neolithic archaeological remains found in the village show that the region around Pano Lefkara has been inhabited for many centuries. The first historical testimony of the existence of Pano Lefkara with its present-day name is found in the testament of Neophytos of Cyprus, born in 1134 in the village of Kato Drys near Pano Lefkara, when Cyprus was part of the Byzantine Empire. The house, which consists of a single room, where Saint Neophytos met with his wife-to-be the night before he ran away to become a monk, still stands. Although a newer house has been built around it, it is now unoccupied and owned by Maritsa Kallou. During the Frankish and Venetian period (1191–1571) Pano Lefkara became a fiefdom. In the 16th century, it was the largest town in Cyprus. From 1571 to 1878 Cyprus was rulled by the Ottoman Empire. Most of the houses conserved in the village date from this period. The bare stone façades with few openings, the layout of rooms around an inner courtyard and the flat rammed-earth roofs are typical elements of the architecture of Pano Lefkara until the late 19th century.

=== British period and independence ===
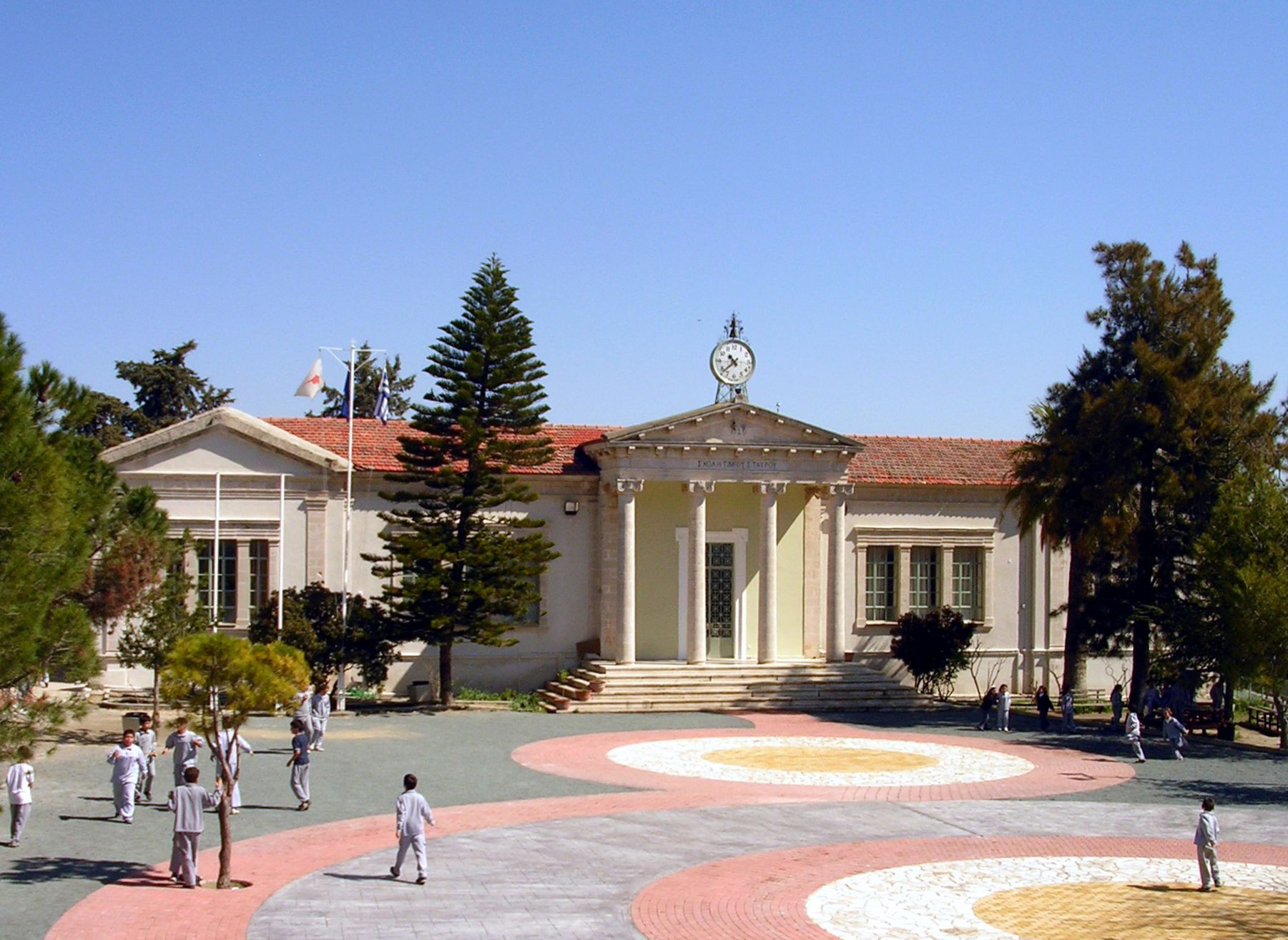
Elementary school

In 1878, Cyprus came under British administration, following the Cyprus Convention and the Treaty of Berlin of that year. Starting in the early 20th century, the commercialisation of local embroidery sold all over Europe by the people of Pano Lefkara produced major changes. Dating from this period are the two-storey houses with shops on their ground floors, sloping ceramic tiled roofs and long balconies running the length of main façades rendered in coloured plaster and decorated with period neoclassical architectural elements.

World War II interrupted the sale of embroidery, which never recovered. The shortage of work forced inhabitants to emigrate en masse and in the 1930s half of the village of Pano Lefkara was left uninhabited.

Historically, the town had a mixed population, consisting of a majority of Greek Cypriots and a minority of Turkish Cypriots. The 1946 census recorded a population of 2,530 Greek Cypriots and 473 Turkish Cypriots, totalling 3,003. A number of residents of Pano Lefkara migrated overseas in the 1950s, such that by 1960, the total population had dropped to 2,075, with 1,714 Greek Cypriots and 361 Turkish Cypriots. Around 400 Turkish Cypriots fled from the village and were displaced to nearby Kofinou during the intercommunal violence from December 1963 to January 1964. They were displaced once again to Northern Cyprus following the Turkish invasion of Cyprus in 1974, being resettled in the village of Agios Theodoros. These displaced residents hold on to the culture of Pano Lefkara, and a Pano Lefkara House where the weaving of the Pano Lefkara lace is taught functions in Agios Theodoros.

Tourism began to develop in the 1970s, saving Pano Lefkara from economic ruin. With traditional architecture still intact, embroidery and artisan silverwork attracted tourists.

== Civic obstacles ==
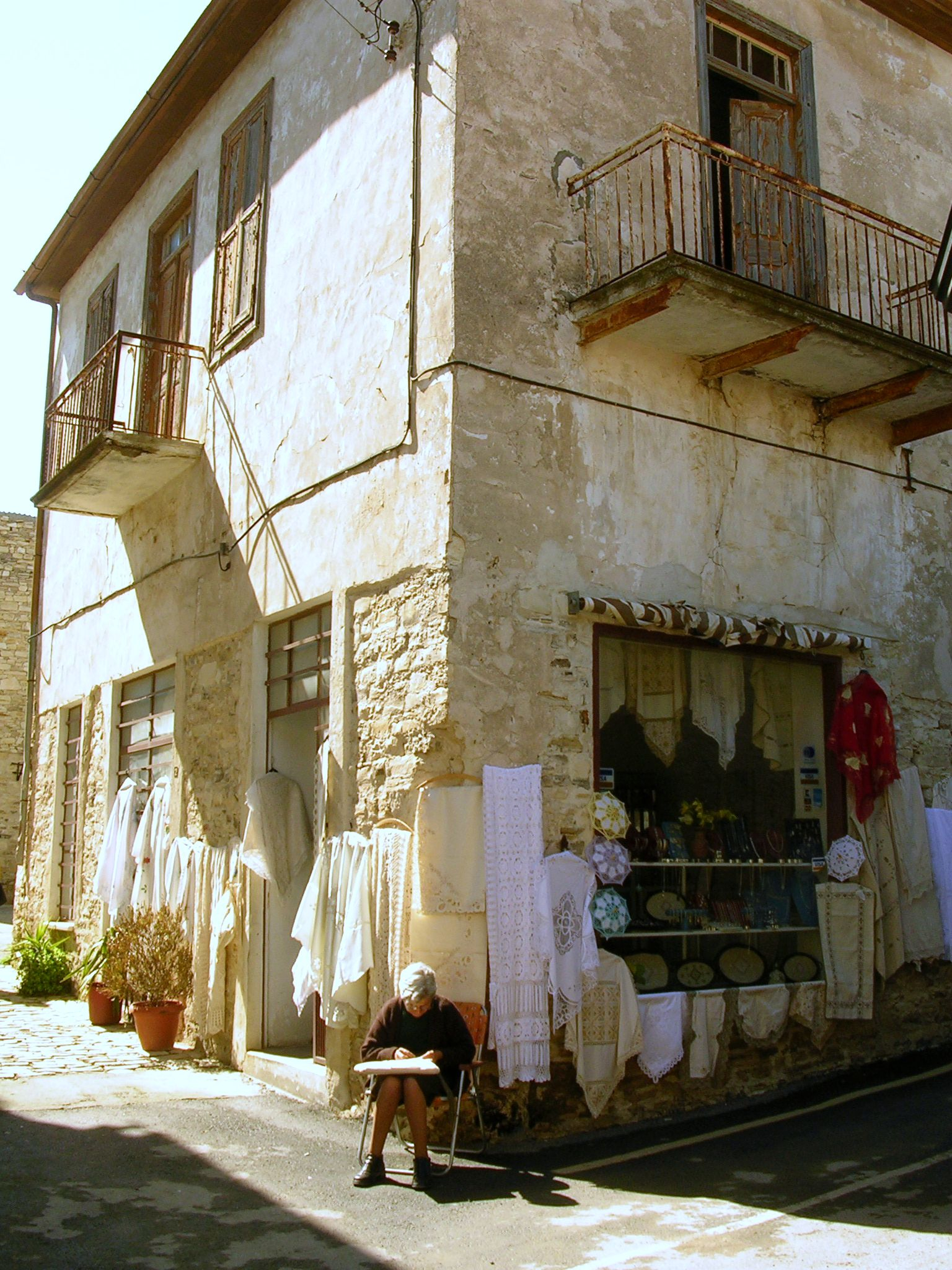
Shop of traditional embroidery in Lefkara

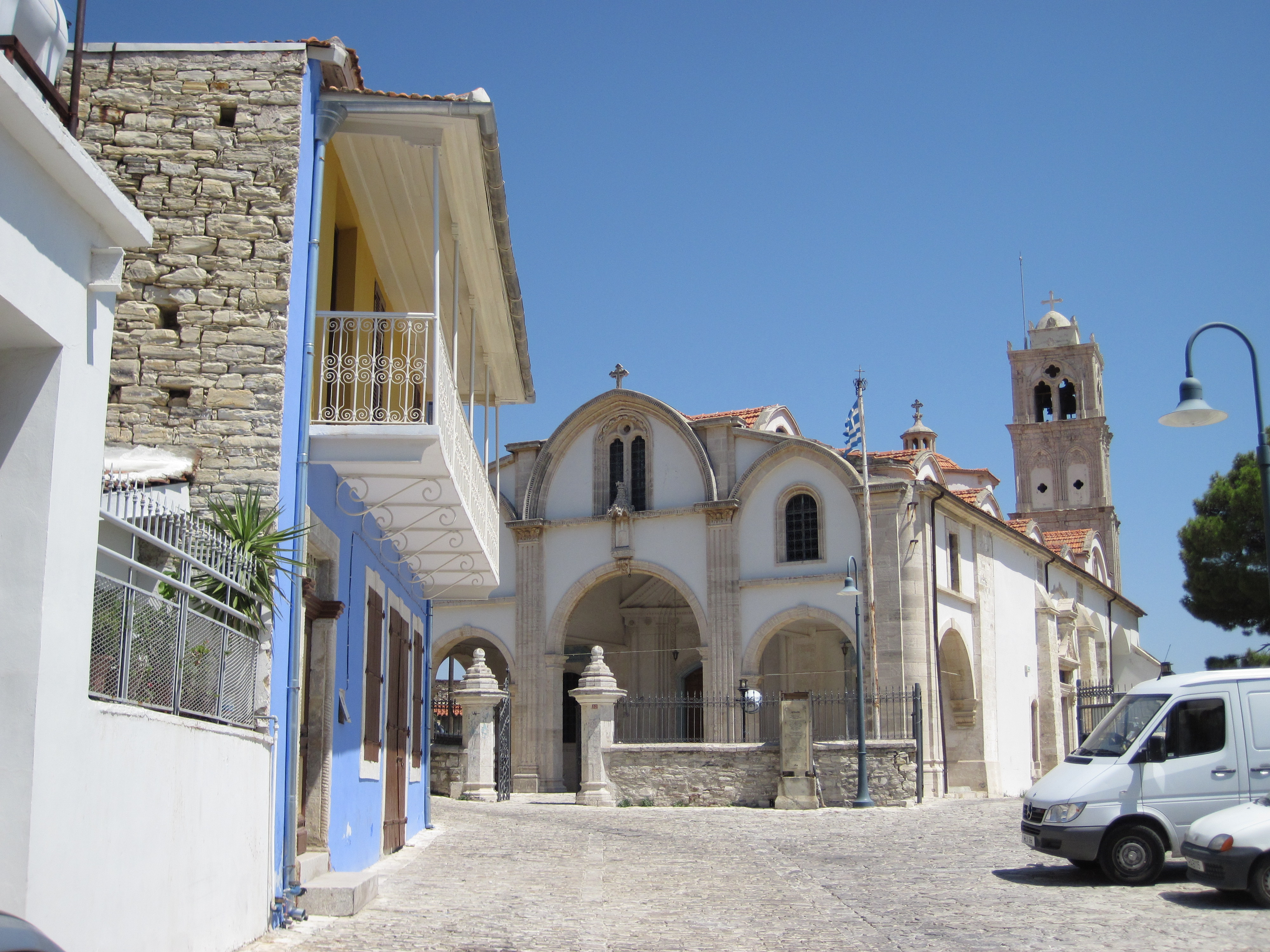
Timios Stavros Church, Pano Lefkara, in 2009

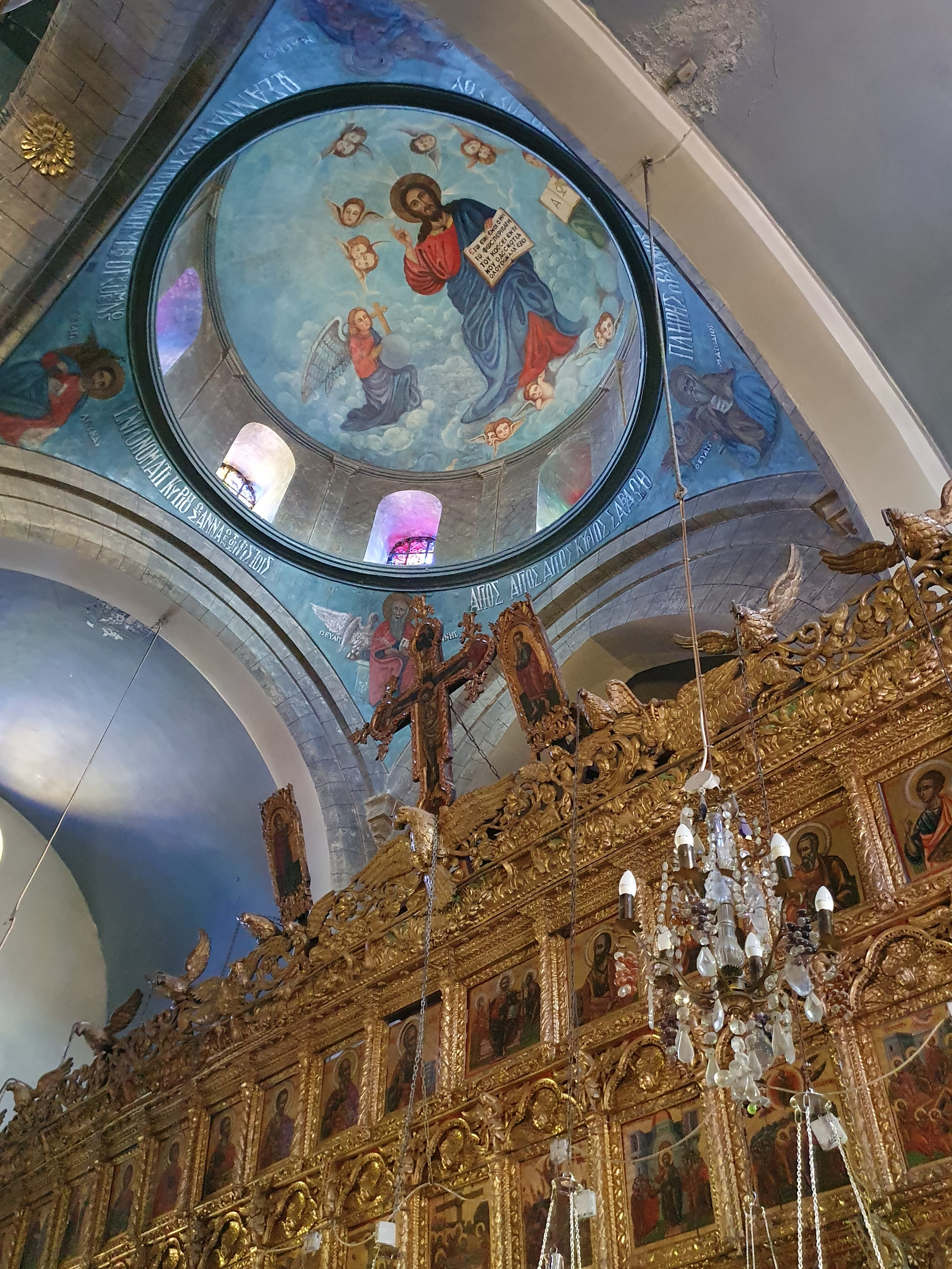
Interior of the Timios Stavros Church

The exodus of the population of Pano Lefkara from the 1930s to the 1970s resulted in the abandonment of many of the dwellings in the village. The development of tourism has had little impact upon the traditional architecture. The use of new materials chosen for reasons of comfort and fashion has had little change on the façades and interiors of traditional dwellings. There are a number of dwellings that have remained untouched and are now closed up and uninhabited. For the most part, the traditional architecture of Pano Lefkara remains intact.

== Conservation and architectural heritage ==
Numerous traditional houses have been listed by the Department of Antiquities and the Department of Housing and Urbanism. Since 1978, several buildings have been rehabilitated by the Department of Antiquities, most particularly the Patsalos residence, which has been converted into a local museum of embroidery and traditional silverwork. A rehabilitation decree issued by the Department of Housing will include all traditional buildings pending listing.

Pano Lefkara has a mosque that was built in the 20th century with the help of Turkish Cypriots living abroad, who had their roots in Pano Lefkara. A previous, Ottoman mosque existed in its place, but was destroyed in the 1890s. The rectangular mosque, with a minaret attached to the northeastern corner, reflects the traditional rural architecture of Cyprus.

== Twin towns — Sister cities ==
Pano Lefkara is twinned with:

- Rafina, Greece
- Lusignan, Vienne, France, which is connected to the House of Lusignan, the former ruling house of the Kingdom of Cyprus
