= Dimitris Papadakis =

Cypriot politician

Dimitris Papadakis MEP
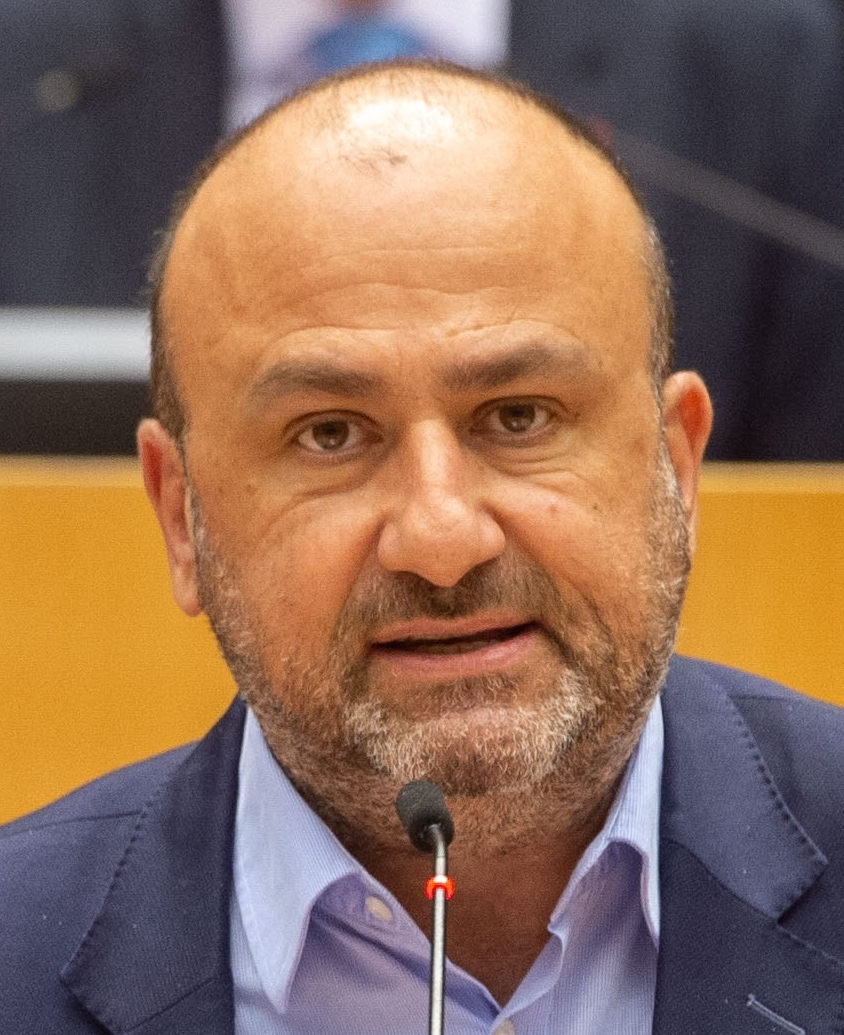

Member of the European Parliament
- In office 1 July 2014 – 16 July 2024
- Constituency: Cyprus

Personal details
- Born: 22 August 1966 (age 59) Famagusta, Cyprus
- Party: Independent (2020-); EDEK (-2020)
- Occupation: Politician

Dimitris Papadakis (born 22 August 1966), is a Cypriot politician, who between July 2014 and July 2024 has served as a Member of the European Parliament, representing Cyprus for the Movement for Social Democracy.

== Parliamentary service ==
- Member, Committee on Foreign Affairs
- Member, Delegation to the EU-Russia Parliamentary Cooperation Committee
