= Kyriakos Mavronikolas =

Cypriot politician

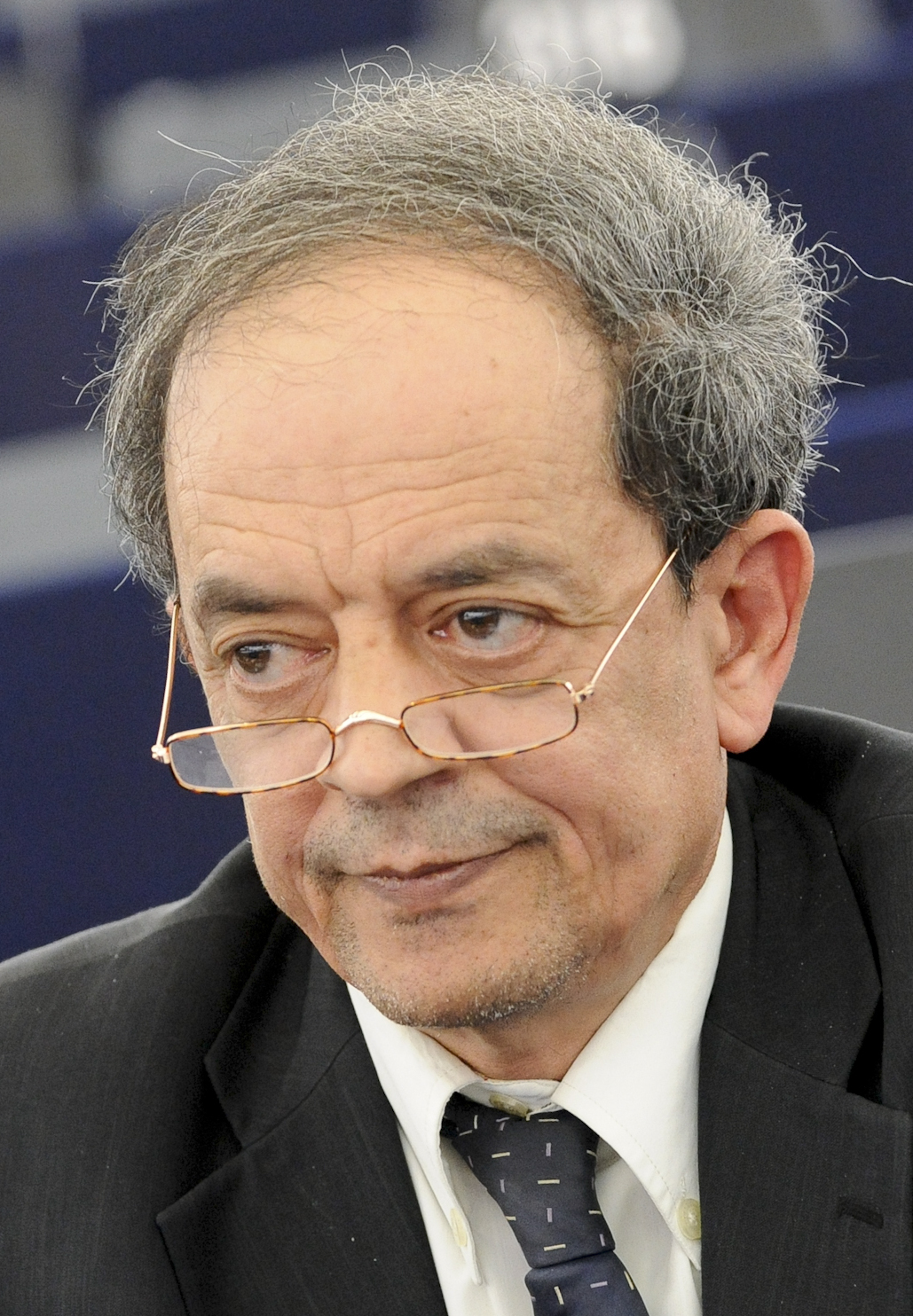

Member of the European Parliament for Cyprus
- In office 14 July 2009 – 31 August 2012

Personal details
- Born: 25 January 1955 (age 71) Paphos
- Party: Movement for Social Democracy
- Spouse: Roula Mavronicola
- Education: University of Athens
- Occupation: Ophthalmologist

Kyriakos Mavronikolas (born 25 January 1955) is a Cypriot Movement for Social Democracy politician. He served as the Cypriot Minister of Defence from 2003 to 2006, and he sat as a Member of the European Parliament for Cyprus from 2009 to 2012, when he vacated his seat and was replaced by Sophocles Sophocleous. Mavronikolas is a graduate of the University of Athens faculty of medicine, and outside politics he works as an ophthalmologist.
