= Eleni Stavrou =

Cypriot politician (born 1975)

- Ελένη Σταύρου
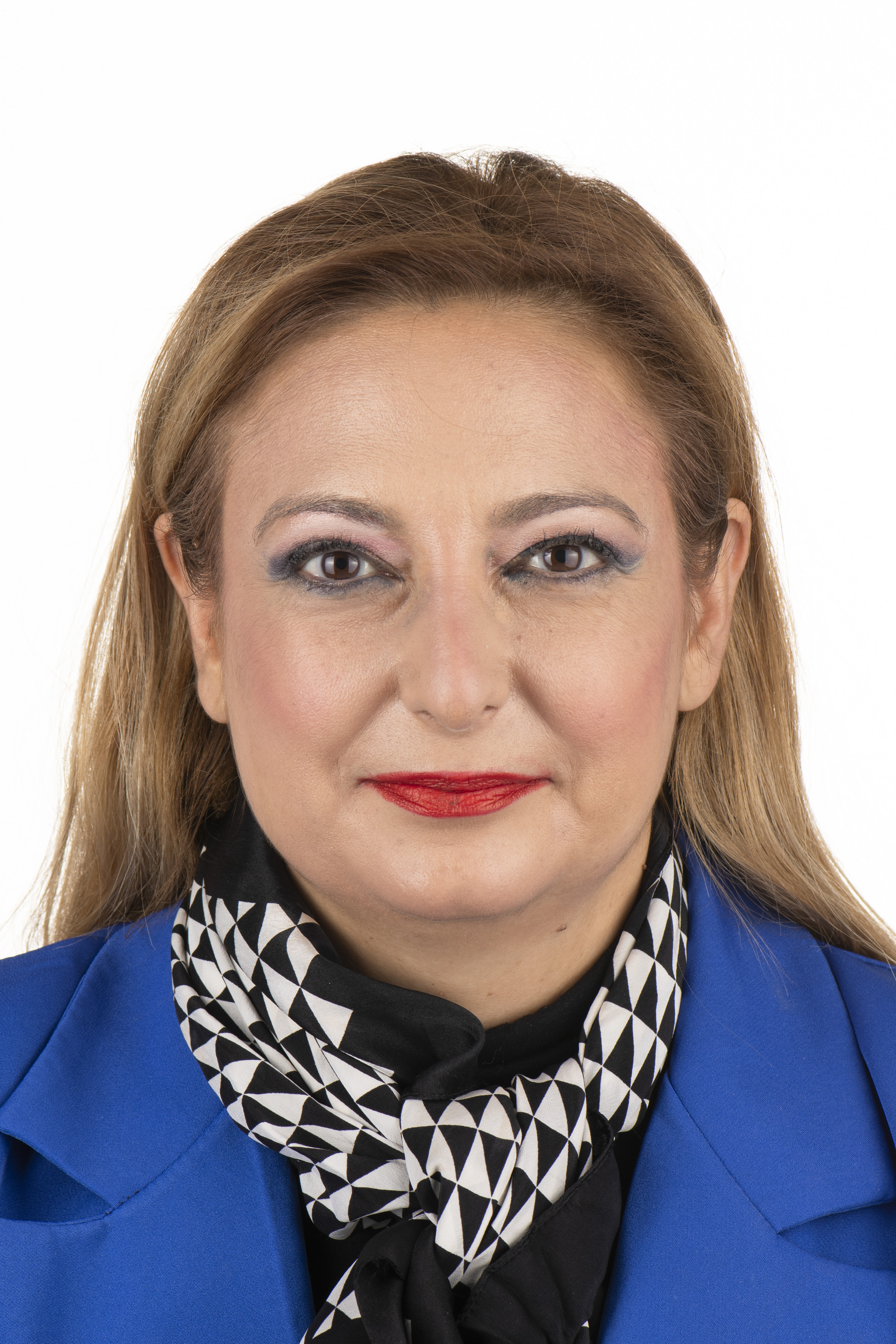

Member of the House of Representatives of Cyprus
- Incumbent
- Assumed office June 2016

Personal details
- Born: 4 July 1975 (age 51)
- Party: Democratic Rally
- Education: National and Kapodistrian University of Athens, King's College London
- Occupation: Politician

Eleni Stavrou (Greek: Ελένη Σταύρου; born 4 July 1975) is a Democratic Rally Member of the Cyprus House of Representatives for Limassol constituency.

== Early life and education ==
Stavrou was born in Turkish-occupied Famagusta and raised in Nicosia, Cyprus.

She studied English literature at the National and Kapodistrian University of Athens and completed an MA in war and Mediterranean studies and a PhD in war studies at King's College London. She underwent post-doctoral studies at the Begin-Sadat Center for Strategic Studies at Bar-Ilan University.

== Political career ==
=== Member of the Cyprus House of Representatives (2016–2022) ===
Stavrou was elected to the House of Representatives in the June 2016 legislative election, representing the Limassol constituency as a member of the Democratic Rally. She served as a member of several house committees, including those on defence affairs, foreign and European affairs, and the environment. She was also a member of the Cypriot delegation to the Interparliamentary Conference for the Common Foreign and Security Policy and the Common Security and Defence Policy of the European Union.

=== Member of the European Parliament (2022–2024) ===
On 1 November 2022, Stavrou was appointed Member of the European Parliament (MEP), succeeding Lefteris Christoforou. She served as a member of the European People's Party Group until 15 July 2024. During her tenure, she was a member of the Committee on Development, the Committee on Budgets, and the Committee on Budgetary Control. She was not re-elected in the 2024 European Parliament election.
