= Loukas Fourlas =

Cypriot politician

Loukas Fourlas MEP
- Λουκάς Φουρλάς
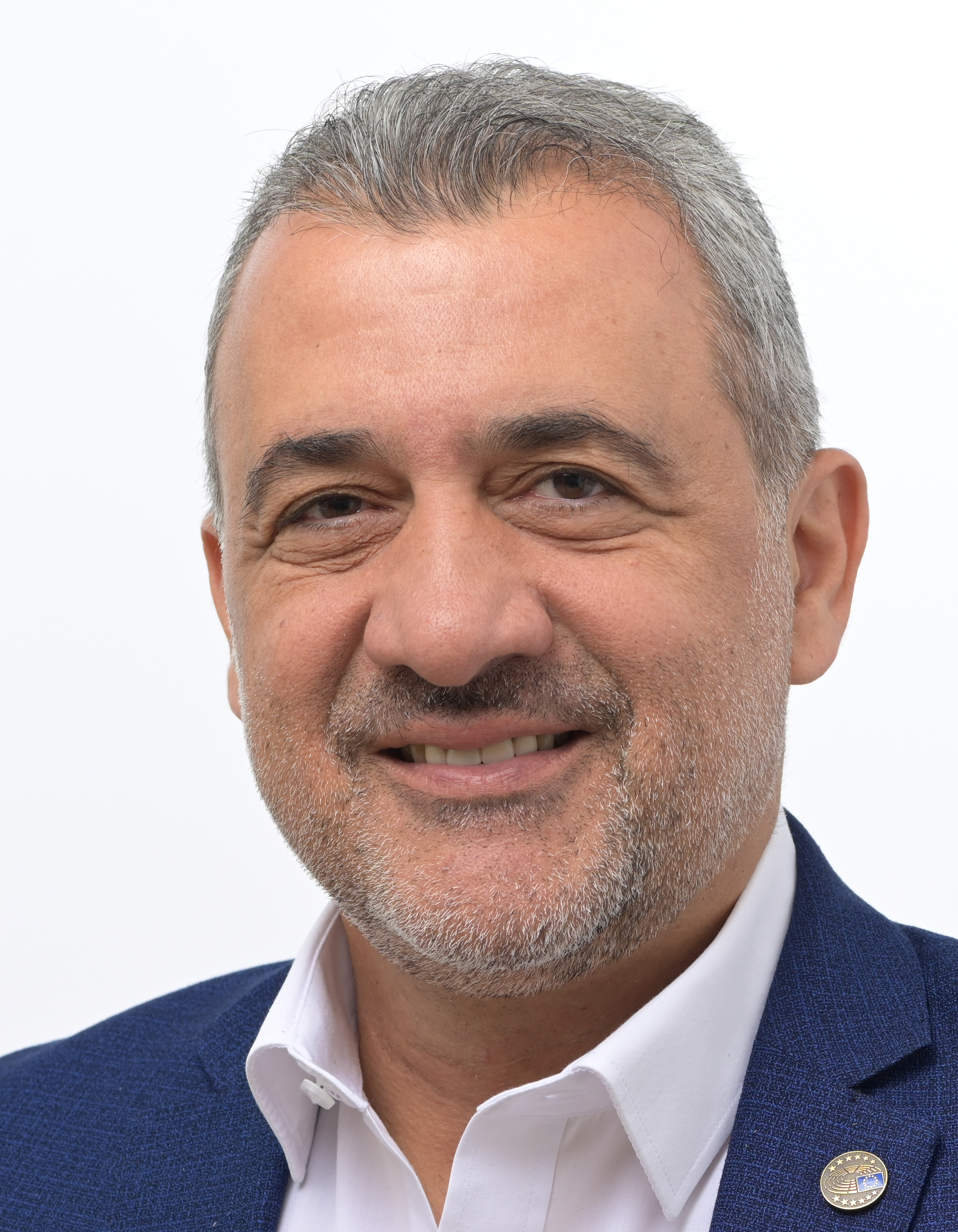

Member of the European Parliament for Cyprus

Personal details
- Born: August 21, 1969 (age 57) Limassol, Cyprus
- Party: Democratic Rally
- Education: Aristotle University of Thessaloniki

Loucas Fourlas (born August 21, 1969) is a Cypriot journalist and politician who has been serving as a Member of the European Parliament for the Democratic Rally since 2019.

In parliament, Fourlas serves on the Committee on Employment and Social Affairs. In 2020, he also joined the Special Committee on Beating Cancer.

In addition to his committee assignments, Fourlas is part of the Parliament’s delegation to the EU-Turkey Joint Parliamentary Committee, the European Parliament Intergroup on Disability and the European Parliament Intergroup on Trade Unions.

In September 2022, Fourlas was the recipient of the Health and Wellbeing Award at The Parliament Magazine's annual MEP Awards.
