= Lefteris Christoforou =

Cypriot politician

Lefteris Christoforou MEP
- Λευτέρης Χριστοφόρου
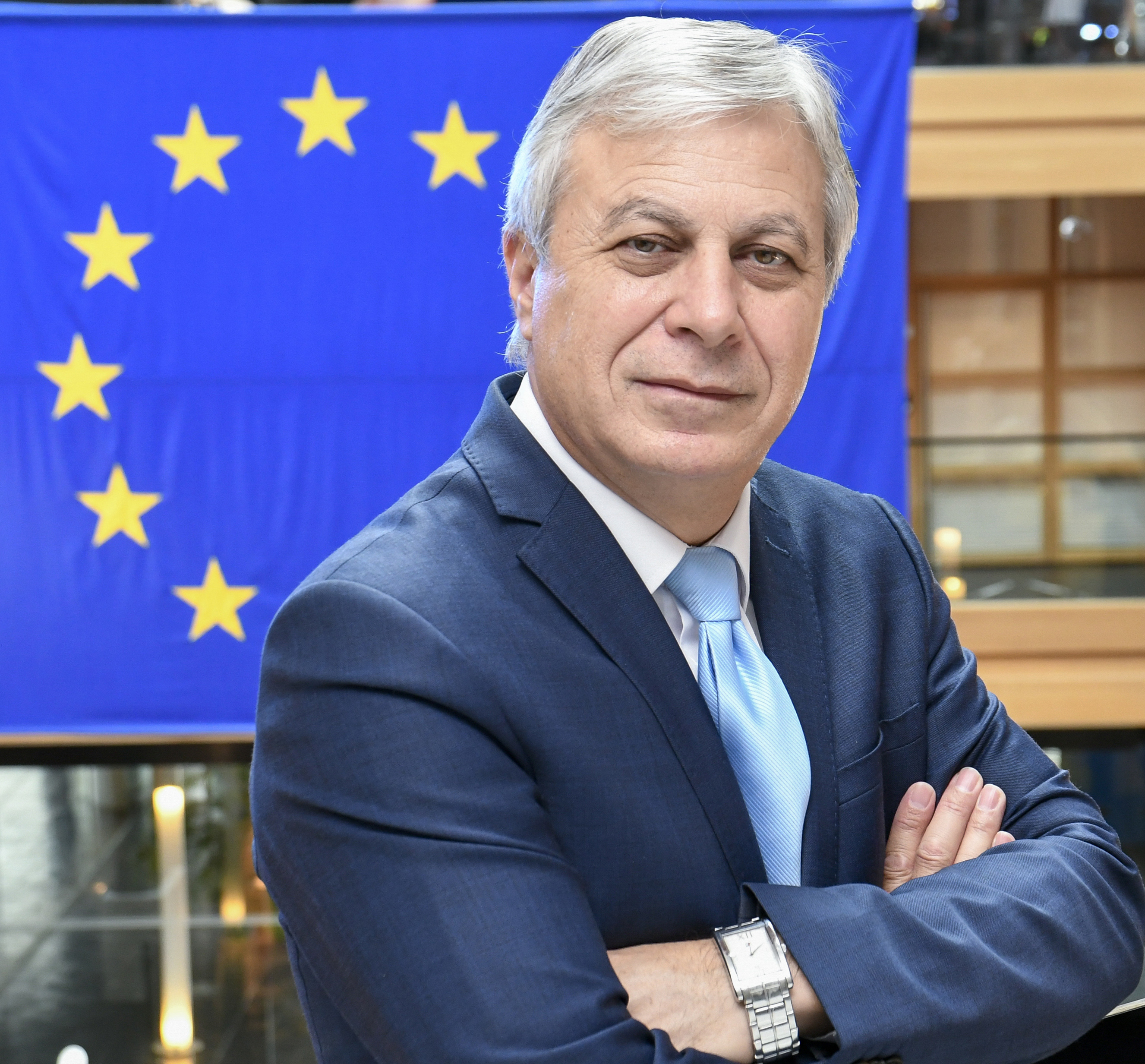

Member of the European Parliament for Cyprus
- In office 1 November 2014 – 2 November 2022

Member of the House of Representatives (Cyprus)
- In office 1996–2014

Personal details
- Born: 31 August 1963 (age 62) Prastio, Famagusta, Cyprus
- Party: Democratic Rally, European Peoples Party
- Spouse: Diamanto Orthodoxou
- Children: 1 son and 1 daughter
- Occupation: Εconomist

Lefteris Christoforou (Greek: Λευτέρης Χριστοφόρου; born 31 August 1963) is a Greek Cypriot politician. He was a member of the European Parliament (MEP) from 2014 to 2022, where he was head of national delegation in the European People's Party. He is a member of the Democratic Rally (DISY) and he served as vice president from 2003 to 2013 and also as deputy chairman from 2013 to 2019. He was a member of the Cyprus Parliament from 1996 to 2014 and represented Famagusta.

== Political career ==
Christoforou started his political activity in the Youth Movement (MAKI), from 1976 to 1981. He continued his activity, during his studies in Greece, in the University Students Movement, Protoporia, of which he was the chairman of the Executive Committee Protoporia. During the period 1993–1996 Lefteris Christoforou served as the district leader of the Youth of the Democratic Rally (NEDISY) of Famagusta.

=== Member of the Cyprus Parliament, 1996–2014 ===
In the 1996 Cyprus national elections, Lefteris Christoforou was elected for the first time as a member of the Cyprus Parliament for DISY. He was the youngest member of the Cyprus Parliament and received the highest number of votes. In the following parliamentary elections of 2001, 2006 and 2011, Christoforou was re-elected as a member of the Cyprus Parliament for the Famagusta District, retaining the lead in terms of electoral votes.

During his term in the Cyprus Parliament, Christoforou served as a chairman of the Parliamentary Committee on Trade, Energy, Tourism and Industry.

Parliamentary posts:

- Member in the Parliamentary Committee on Finance
- Member in the Parliamentary Committee on Institutions and Values
- Member in the Parliamentary Committee for Refugees and Missing Persons
- Member in the Parliamentary Committee on Home Affairs

=== Member of the European Parliament, 2014 – 2022 ===
In 2004 he was appointed by the Cyprus Parliament as an observer in the European Parliament.

Christoforou was a member of the European Parliament with the European People's Party Group. He was the leader of the Cyprus delegation in the European People's Party Group.

He served as:

- Member in the Committee on Budgets
- Member in the Committee on Budgetary Control
- Member in the Committee on Economic and Monetary Affairs

In addition to his committee assignments, Christoforou was a member of the European Parliament Intergroup on Freedom of Religion or Belief and Religious Tolerance, the European Parliament Intergroup on Cancer and the European Parliament Intergroup on Disability.

== Education and early career ==
Christoforou studied economics with a scholarship from IKY and graduated with distinction from the Aristotle University of Thessaloniki. He continued his postgraduate studies in business administration at the Aristotle University of Thessaloniki.

Before his political career, Christoforou worked in the financial and banking sector in Greece and in Cyprus and gained significant experience in finance and in banking.

== Personal information ==
Christoforou is married to Diamanto Orthodoxou and has a son, Panagiotis, and a daughter, Loukia.
