= Angelidou =

Angelidou (Greek: Αγγελίδου) is a Greek surname. Notable people with the surname include:

- Klairi Angelidou (1932–2021), Cypriot educator, poet, translator, and politician
- Marlen Angelidou, Cypriot singer and actress

== See also ==
- Angelides
- Angelidis
