= 2016 Cypriot legislative election =

- 22 May 2016

56 of 80 seats in the House of Representatives
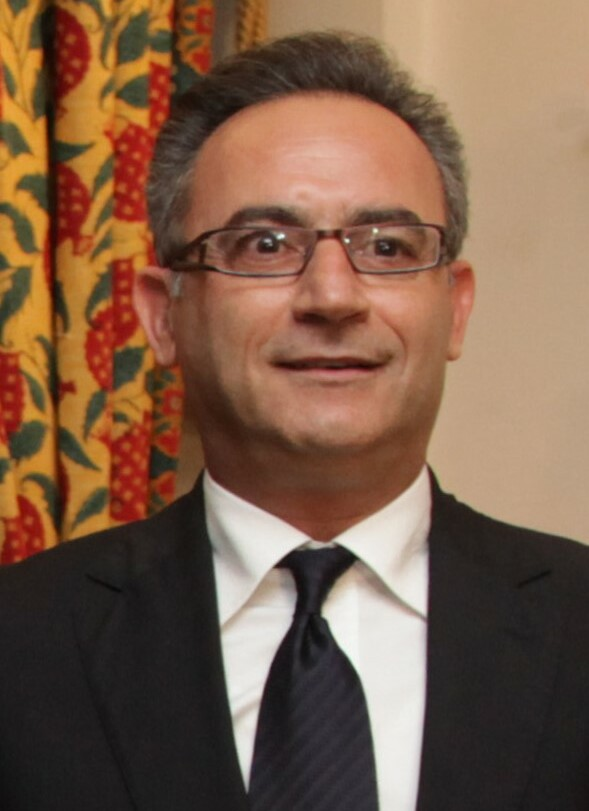

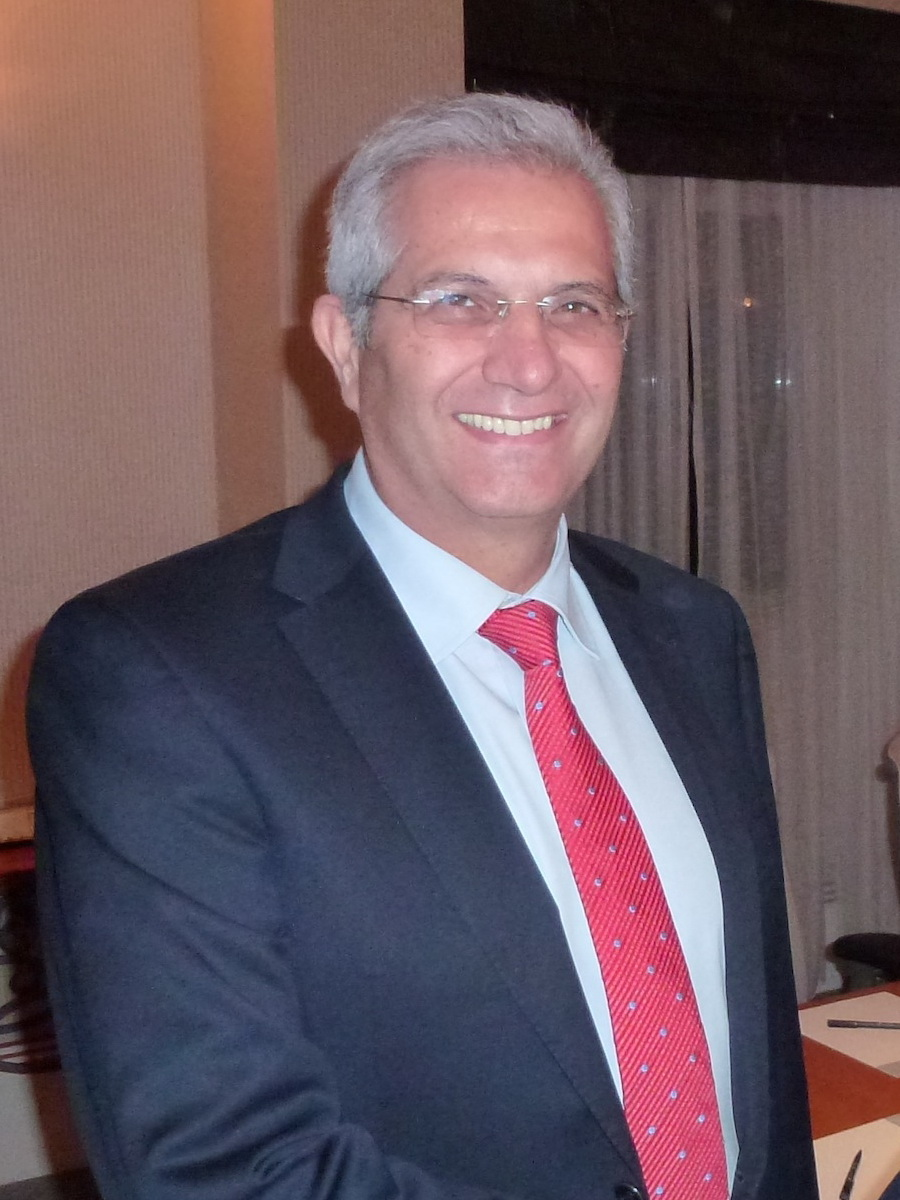

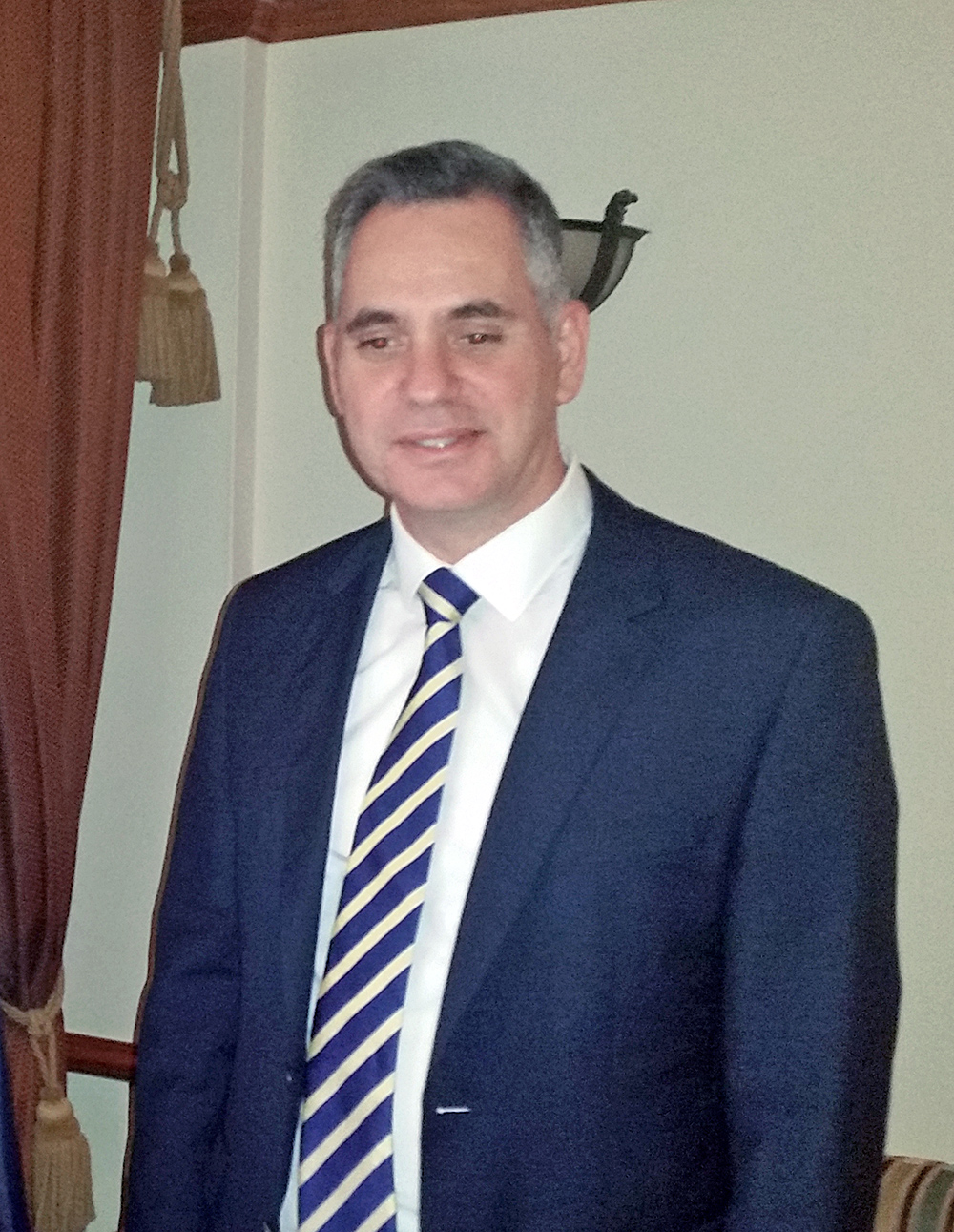

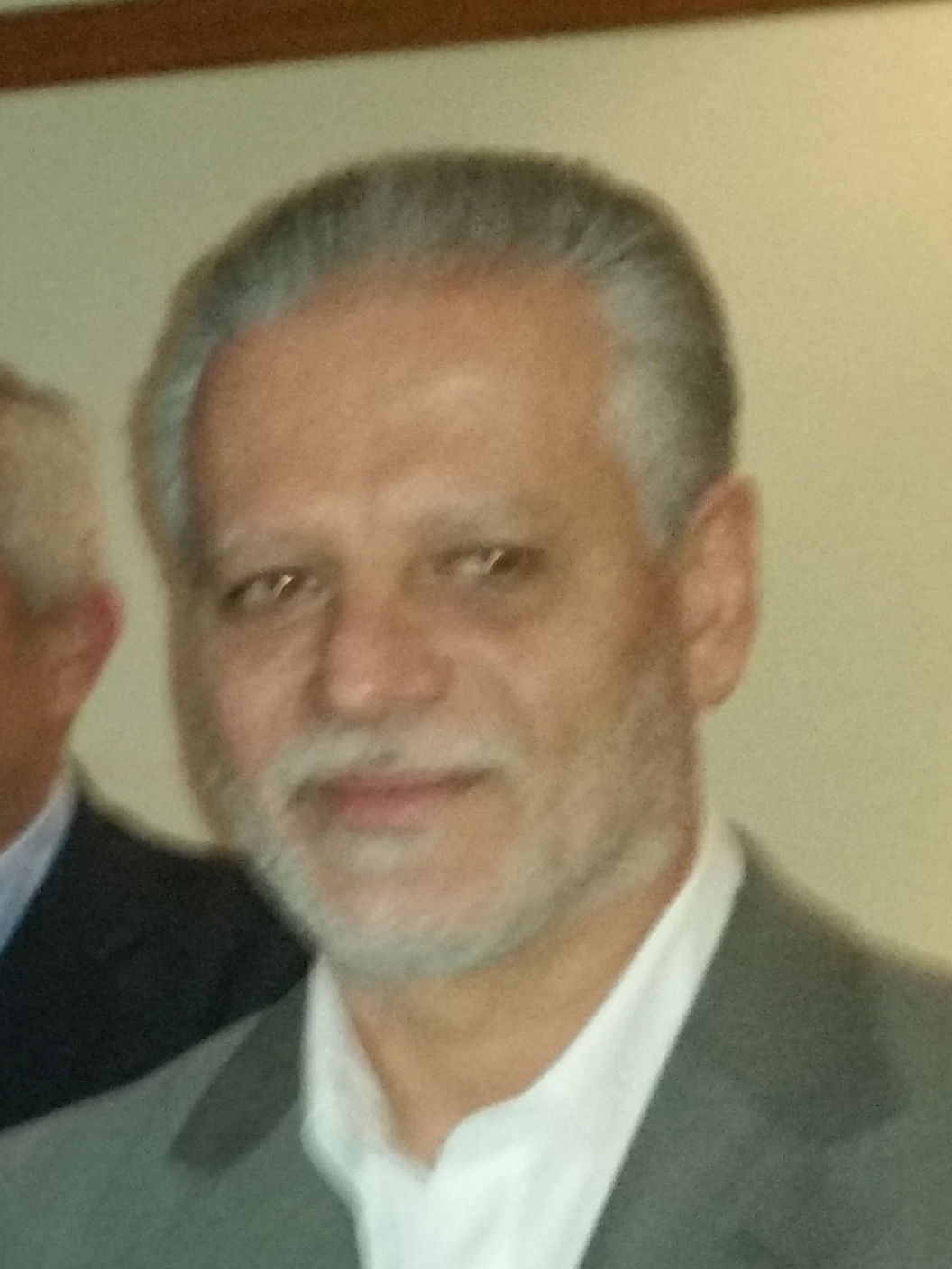

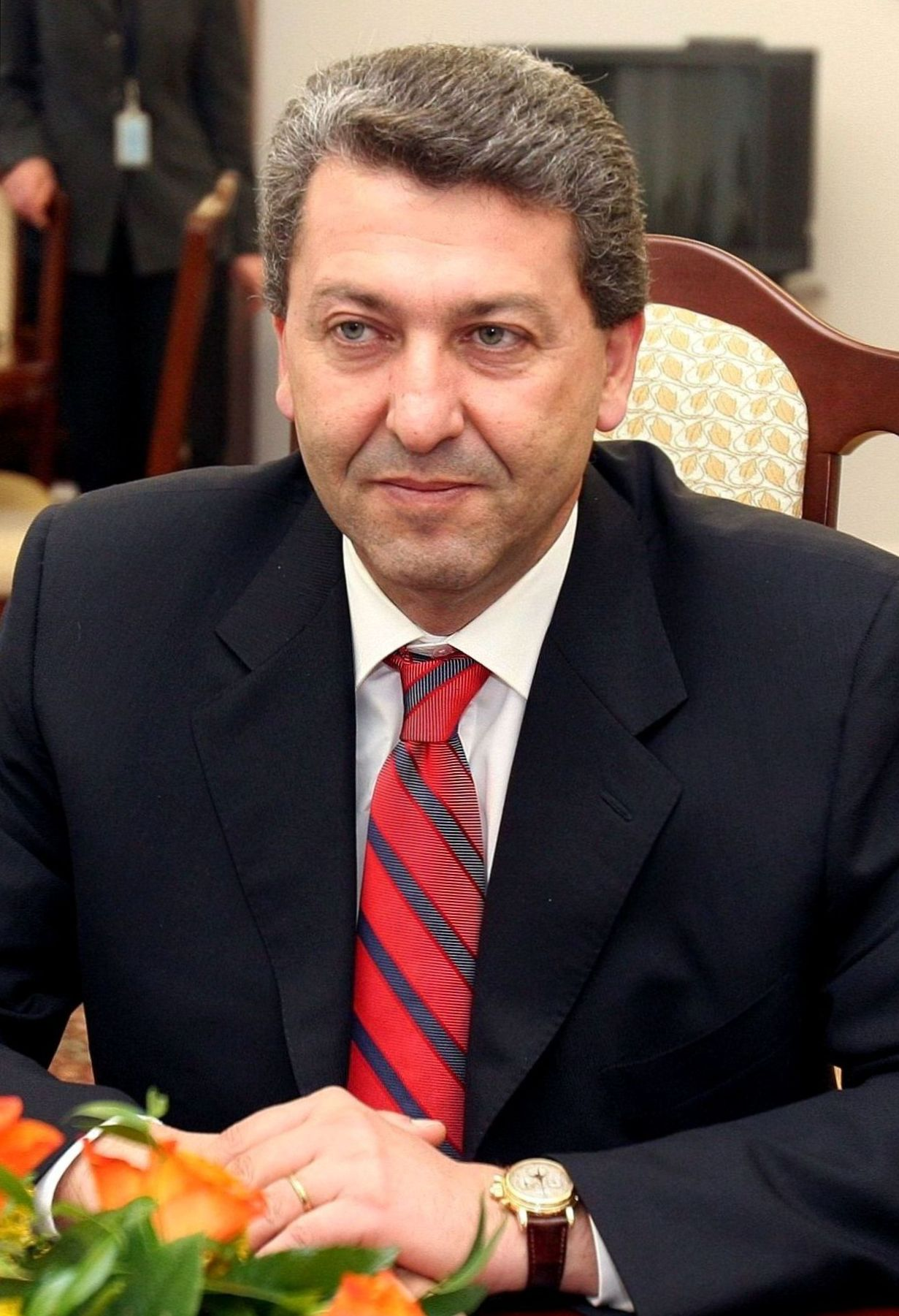

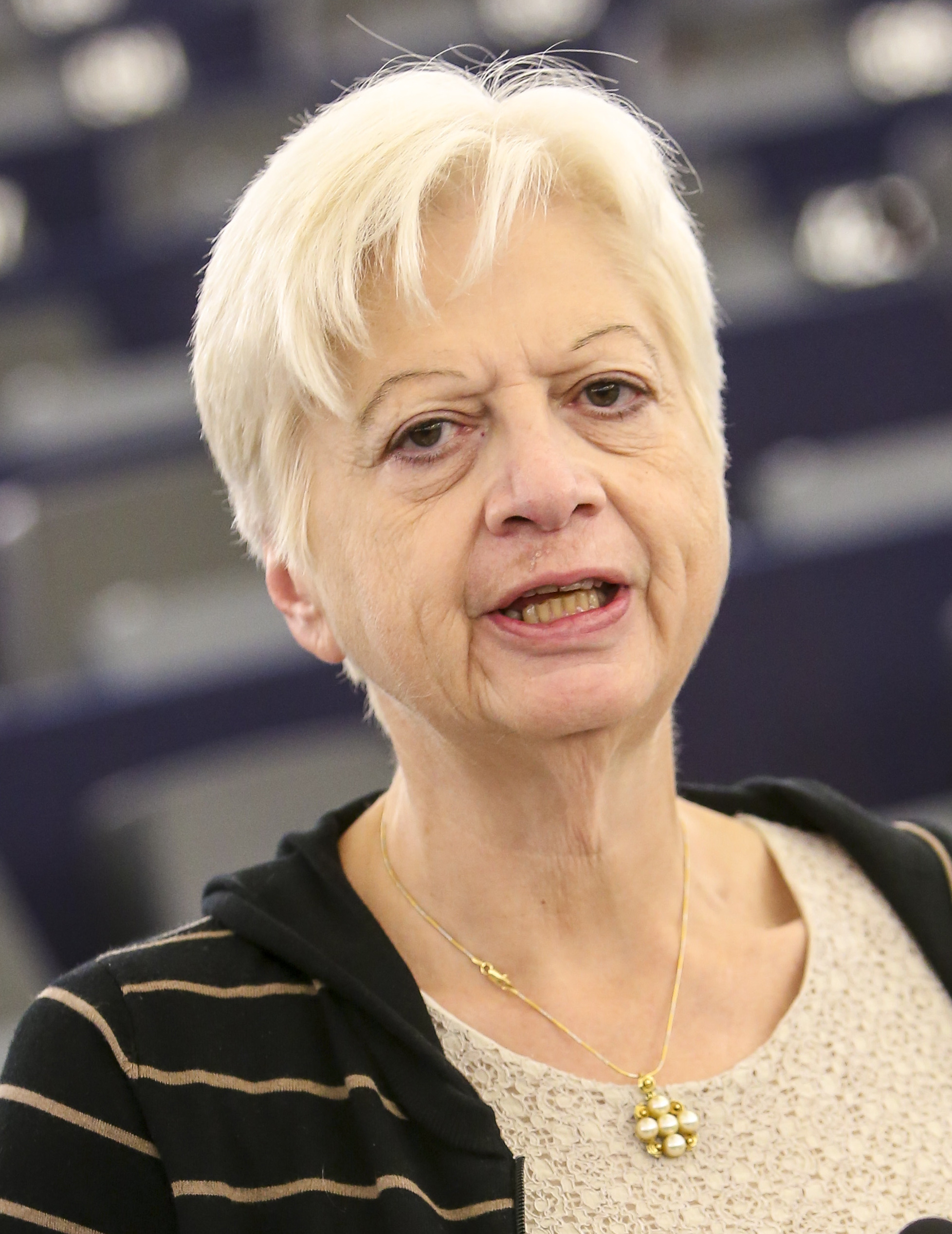

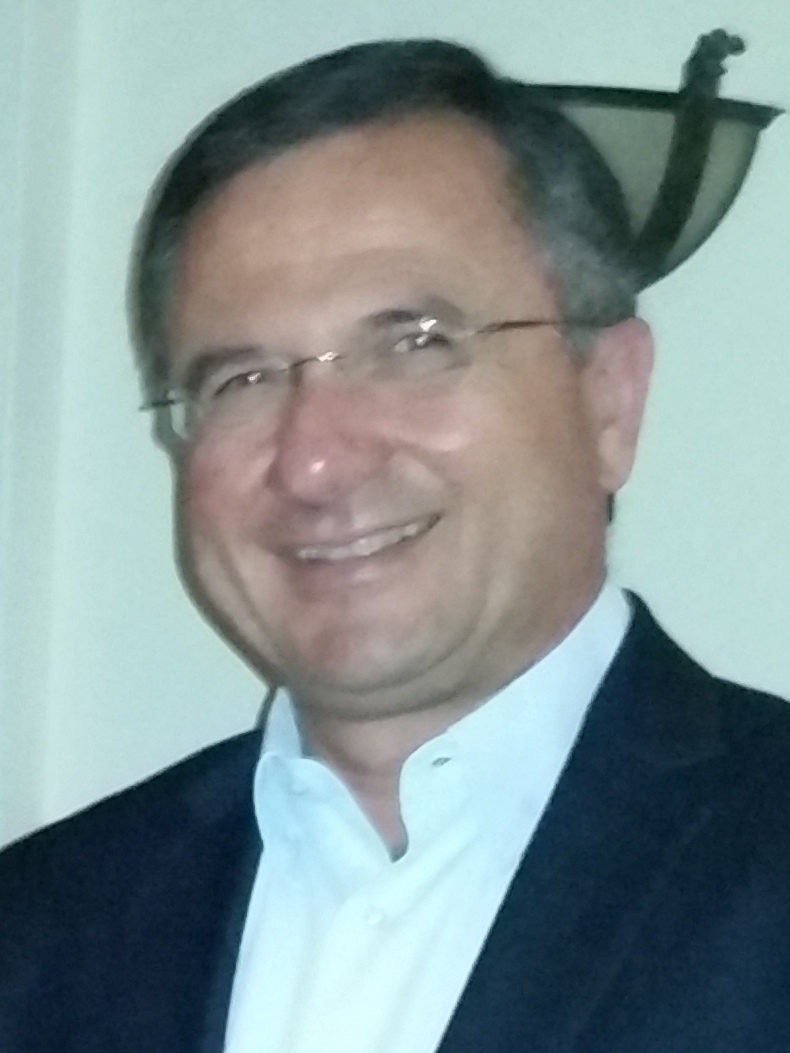

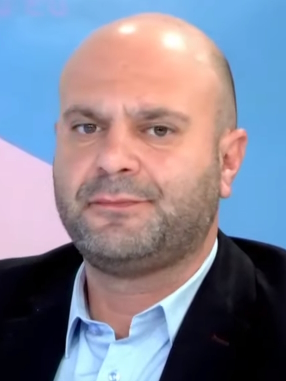
	First party	Second party	Third party
Leader	Averof Neophytou	Andros Kyprianou	Nikolas Papadopoulos
Party	DISY	AKEL	DIKO
Leader since	2013	2009	2013
Last election	20 seats, 34.3%	19 seats, 32.7%	9 seats, 15.8%
Seats won	18	16	9
Seat change	▼2	▼3	0
Popular vote	107,825	90,204	50,923
Percentage	30.7%	25.7%	14.5%
Swing	▼3.6pp	▼7.0pp	▼1.3pp
	Fourth party	Fifth party	Sixth party
Leader	Marinos Sizopoulos	Giorgos Lillikas	Eleni Theocharous
Party	EDEK	SYPOL	Solidarity
Leader since	2015	2013	2016
Last election	5 seats, 8.9%	Did not stand	Did not stand
Seats won	3	3	3
Seat change	▼2	▲3	▲1
Popular vote	21,732	21,114	18,424
Percentage	6.2%	6.0%	5.2%
Swing	▼2.7pp	▲6.0pp	▲5.2pp
	Seventh party	Eighth party
Leader	George Perdikes	Christos Christou
Party	KOSP	ELAM
Leader since	2011	2008
Last election	1 seat, 2.2%	0 seats, 1.1%
Seats won	2	2
Seat change	▲1	▲2
Popular vote	16,909	13,041
Percentage	4.8%	3.7%
Swing	▲2.6pp	▲2.6pp
- Results by district
President of the House of Representatives before election
Yiannakis Omirou
EDEK
Elected President of the House of Representatives
Demetris Syllouris
Solidarity

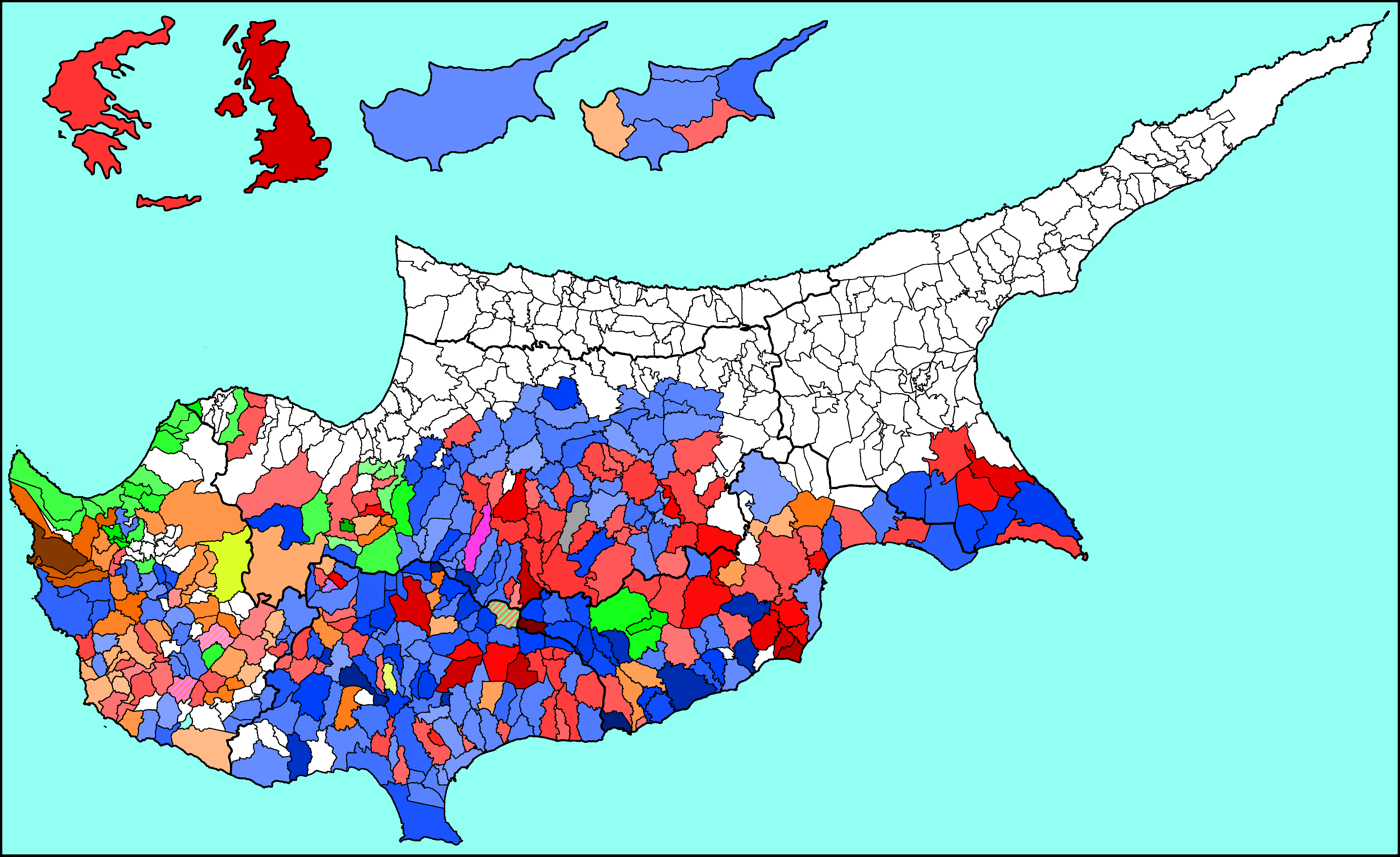
Results by locality.

Parliamentary elections were held in Cyprus on 22 May 2016 to elect 56 of the 80 Members of the House of Representatives.

== Political system ==
The Republic of Cyprus is a unitary republic with a presidential system of government. The President of Cyprus, directly elected in the middle of the legislative term, is both head of state and head of government, presiding over the executive Council of Ministers. The multi-member proportional elections to the House of Representatives however accommodate a multi-party system, where the elected president's party usually joins forces with smaller parties to form a joint coalition government that usually adapts to parliamentary shifts after legislative elections.

=== Electoral system ===
The 80 seats in the House of Representatives are elected from six multi-member constituencies, with the number of seats allocated according to the population of each area. Of the 80 seats, 56 are elected by Greek Cypriots and 24 by Turkish Cypriots. However, due to the partition of the island in 1974, the 24 Turkish Cypriot seats are unfilled and the House of Representatives has de facto had 56 seats since its enlargement in the 1980s.

The elections are held using open list proportional representation, with seats allocated using the Hare quota. Any remaining seats are allocated to lists that won at least one seat or parties that received at least 3.6% of the vote. In the open list system, voters first select the list they want to vote for, and then select a number of candidates equal to a quarter of the number of seats in the constituency. Party leaders or other candidates heading coalitions are not required to receive preferential votes to be elected. Although compulsory voting had not been formally abolished at the time the elections took place (it was abolished in 2017), the law had not been enforced for years.

== Background ==
=== 2011 ===
The previous legislative election took place on 22 May 2011. President Demetris Christofias of the communist Progressive Party of Working People (AKEL) had led a coalition consisting of his party as well as the centrist Democratic Party (DIKO) and the social-democratic Movement for Social Democracy (EDEK) since his election in 2008.

After three years in power, AKEL scored 32.7% in the 2011 legislative elections, narrowly behind the opposition center-right Democratic Rally, which polled 34.3% of votes. Meanwhile, AKEL's partners DIKO and EDEK scored 15.8% and 8.9% respectively. A mere two months after the legislative election, the Evangelos Florakis Naval Base explosion took place, triggering calls for President Christofias' resignation.

=== 2013 ===
Amidst widespread dissatisfaction and a deepening economic crisis, Christofias announced that he would not run for a second term in the presidential election in 2013. Ultimately, Nicos Anastasiades of DISY emerged victorious in the presidential election, taking 45.5% of the vote, against 26.9% for the AKEL-backed Stavros Malas and the EDEK-backed Giorgos Lillikas. In the second round, Anastasiades captured 57.5% to 42.5% for Malas. The Anastasiades administration took office on 28 February 2013, comprising DISY, DIKO and the European Party (EVROKO). The Democrats later pulled out of the coalition, however.

=== 2014 ===
Roughly a year into the presidency of Nicos Anastasiades, the Cypriot parties faced the electorate in European Parliament elections. Ahead of the election, DISY and EVROKO announced that they would participate in the election on a joint ticket; the social democrats in EDEK and the Ecological and Environmental Movement (KOP) also formed an electoral pact for the event. With the economic problems the country faced under Demetris Christofias' AKEL-led government fresh in the minds of voters, the party plummeted to 27.0% of the vote, a loss of 8.4% points. Meanwhile, the DISY-EVROKO pact garnered 37.8%. This election also served as the first electoral test of the Citizens' Alliance (SYPOL) party of former presidential candidate Giorgos Lillikas, which polled 6.8% but failed to win seats in the European Parliament. The decline of AKEL and the rise of anti-establishment parties continued into 2015 and 2016.

=== 2016 ===
Mere months before the 2016 legislative election, ex-DISY MEP Eleni Theocharous launched a splinter party, in opposition to Anastasiades' approach to the Cyprus issue. She advocated for tighter co-operation with other parties particularly DIKO and EDEK. The new party was dubbed the Solidarity Movement. On 11 March 2016, it was announced that EVROKO would merge into the new party, placing its candidates on its lists in the upcoming elections.

== Parties and leaders ==
Party	Ideology	Leader
Democratic Rally (DISY)	Liberal conservatism, Christian democracy	Averof Neophytou
Progressive Party of Working People (AKEL)	Communism, Marxism-Leninism, Cypriot nationalism	Andros Kyprianou
Democratic Party (DIKO)	Greek Cypriot nationalism, Centrism	Nikolas Papadopoulos
Movement for Social Democracy (EDEK)	Greek Cypriot nationalism, Social democracy	Marinos Sizopoulos
Movement of Ecologists - Citizens' Cooperation (KOSP)	Green politics, Social democracy	George Perdikes
National Popular Front (ELAM)	Ultranationalism	Christos Christou
Citizens' Alliance (SYPOL)	Populism, Social democracy	Giorgos Lillikas
Solidarity Movement (KA)	National conservatism, Euroscepticism	Eleni Theocharous

== Electoral campaigns ==
A televised debate of DISY leader Averof Neophytou, AKEL leader Andros Kyprianou and DIKO leader Nicolas Papadopoulos on 18 May 2016 turned into a heated exchange on economy issues and the question of reunification. Papadopoulos claimed that "behind closed doors", AKEL was trying to resurrect the 2004 Annan plan that was turned down by the Greek side in a referendum. While Neophytou and Papadopoulos criticized AKEL's judgment of the economic situation ahead of the 2012–13 Cypriot financial crisis, Kyprianou recalled his two rivals' assessments at that time. Back then in October 2008, Neophytou had expected things to go "very well", though "based on overconsumption", while Papadopoulos had gone even further off the mark stating: "Yes, our economy will be impacted, but certainly not our financial system, which is one of the most resilient in the world."

== Opinion polls ==
Date	Polling Firm	DISY	AKEL	DIKO	EDEK	EVROKO	KOP	ELAM	SYPOL	KA	Others	Lead
13 May 2016	Symmetron / Marc	31.8	26.0	13.7	5.7	with KA	5.2	3.3	6.1	5.6	2.6	5.8
5–11 May 2016	Cypronetwork	32.2	25.5	14.2	5.7	with KA	5.4	3.2	6.1	4.2	3.5	6.7
5–10 May 2016	IMR	35.8	29.2	13.1	5.1	with KA	4.4	2.2	5.1	5.1	0.0	6.6
4–7 May 2016	PMR & C	31.5	24.9	14.3	6.0	with KA	4.4	3.3	6.6	4.3	4.7	6.6
26 Apr–3 May 2016	IMR	31.7	26.6	13.7	6.3	with KA	4.8	2.0	6.7	6.3	2.0	5.1
14–20 Apr 2016	IMR	33.8	26.2	12.7	6.2	with KA	4.0	2.7	6.6	5.3	2.5	7.6
8–18 Apr 2016	IMR	35.1	25.4	13.4	6.7	with KA	4.5	2.2	6.0	4.5	2.2	9.7
16 April 2016	Kathimerini	34.7	24.0	14.1	6.1	with KA	5.3	2.9	7.3	3.8	1.8	10.7
11–16 Apr 2016	PMR & C	31.9	24.8	13.8	6.0	with KA	4.7	2.6	6.8	4.4	5.0	7.1
3 April 2016	IMR	37.0	27.8	11.1	5.6	with KA	3.7	1.9	7.4	3.7	1.8	9.2
14–19 Mar 2016	PMR & C	31.9	25.9	12.8	6.3	with KA	5.0	2.5	6.5	4.4	4.7	6.0
25 Feb–2 Mar 2016	IMR	33.1	25.5	10.0	5.5	1.7	4.1	2.8	6.4	6.6	4.3	7.6
15–19 Feb 2016	PMR & C	34.0	24.7	13.7	6.0	2.1	4.6	3.3	6.2	–	5.4	9.3
13–17 Jul 2015	GPO	33.1	30.8	12.5	7.2	1.5	3.0	1.8	7.8	–	2.3	2.3
22 May	Election 2011	34.3	32.7	15.8	8.9	3.9	2.2	1.1	—	—	1.1	1.6

=== Exit polls ===
Election day exit polls
TV channel	DISY	AKEL	DIKO	EDEK	KOP	KA	SYPOL	ELAM
CyBC	29.5 – 32.5	26.5–29.5	12–14	5–7	4–5	4–7	5–7	3.5–4.5
ANT1	29.5 – 33.5	25.5–29.5	12.5 –14.5	5.3–6.7	3.3–4.7	3.8–5.2	4.5–5.7	3.5–4.5
MEGA	30.5 – 33.5	26–29	11.5–14	4.5–6.6	3.5–4.5	3.5–4.5	4.5–6.6	2.5–4.5
Sigma	29 – 34	24–29	12–15	4–6.5	3.5–6	4.5–7	4.5–7	3–5.5

== Results ==
Party	Votes	%	Seats	+/–
Democratic Rally	107,825	30.69	18	–2
Progressive Party of Working People	90,204	25.67	16	–3
Democratic Party	50,923	14.49	9	0
Movement for Social Democracy	21,732	6.18	3	–2
Citizens' Alliance	21,114	6.01	3	New
Solidarity Movement	18,424	5.24	3	New
Movement of Ecologists – Citizens' Cooperation	16,909	4.81	2	+1
National Popular Front	13,041	3.71	2	+2
Animal Party Cyprus	4,088	1.16	0	New
People's Breath	3,072	0.87	0	New
Flag Social Movement	2,033	0.58	0	New
Union of Fighters for Justice	983	0.28	0	New
Independents	1,041	0.30	0	0
Total	351,389	100.00	56	0
Valid votes	351,389	96.92		
Invalid/blank votes	11,153	3.08		
Total votes	362,542	100.00		
Registered voters/turnout	543,186	66.74		
Source: Ministry of Interior

=== By district ===
Constituency	DISY			AKEL			DIKO			EDEK			Citizens' Alliance			Solidarity Movement			Greens			ELAM			Others			T/o
Constituency	#	%	S	#	%	S	#	%	S	#	%	S	#	%	S	#	%	S	#	%	S	#	%	S	#	%	S	T/o
Nicosia	35,867	29.25	6	29,288	23.89	5	16,323	13.31	3	8,301	6.77	1	7,457	6.08	1	6,919	5.64	1	9,096	7.42	2	4,265	3.48	1	5,086	4.15	0	65.50
Kyrenia	5,195	28.60	2	4,692	25.83	1	3,511	19.33	0	789	4.34	0	1,153	6.35	0	645	3.55	0	911	5.01	0	594	3.27	0	676	3.72	0	65.57
Famagusta	27,538	38.24	4	22,098	30.69	3	6,480	9.00	1	2,663	3.70	0	3,359	4.66	1	2,888	4.01	1	2,464	3.42	0	2,596	3.60	1	1,929	2.68	0	67.14
Larnaca	10,449	28.38	2	10,811	29.36	2	5,776	15.69	2	2,280	6.19	0	2,038	5.54	0	2,077	5.64	0	1,080	2.93	0	1,205	3.27	0	1,104	3.00	0	67.94
Limassol	21,876	30.48	3	17,893	24.93	4	11,533	16.07	2	3,077	4.29	1	5,184	7.22	1	5,254	7.32	1	2,681	3.74	0	2,421	3.37	0	1,846	2.57	0	66.09
Paphos	6,900	22.98	1	5,422	18.06	1	7,300	24.32	1	4,622	15.40	1	1,923	6.41	0	641	2.14	0	677	2.26	0	1,960	6.53	0	576	1.92	0	72.31

=== Analysis and reception ===
The election had the lowest turnout for a legislative election in the history of the Republic of Cyprus. "General apathy with public affairs, but likewise frustration with the credit crunch and disappointment with politicians" was cited in the Cyprus Mail for the low turnout, whilst political analyst Hubert Faustmann cited "dissatisfaction of the public with the bigger parties" and "that parliamentary elections in Cyprus are not that important, given the weakness of the Cypriot parliament". AKEL was seen as the biggest loser of the election, possible reasons being cited as the party's failure to take up a "proactive" role and continued disillusionment with the Christofias administration. In contrast, an AKEL member, Irini Charalambidou, gained the highest number of votes for any candidate, following her stark critique of and fight against failing banks. The results were interpreted as a weakening of the front calling for a federal solution by the Turkish Cypriot press and political analyst Louis Igoumenides. Whilst the pro-solution parties, DISY and AKEL, still received a combined 56% of the votes against 40% obtained by anti-solution parties, in the case of a referendum the "yes" vote was expected by Igoumenides to be much lower, partly due to the refusal of fanatic voters of DISY and AKEL to collaborate.

In terms of economics, the Anastasiades government became dependent on smaller parties to pass important reforms. This was expected to impede the ability of the government to pass these reforms, economic analyst Fiona Mullen said "I think we can forget privatization altogether". This was also the first time the far-right party ELAM entered the parliament. Anti-racist NGO KISA called upon political parties in the parliament to counter ELAM and stated its "concern over the number of absentee voters and the rightward drift of the electorate towards political parties that espouse racism and nationalism" and Turkish Cypriot daily Diyalog called the party "terrorist".

Cypriot electoral expert Yiannis Mavris said: "The electoral results herald a new political era for Cyprus. New small parties seem to be here to stay and will be exerting continuous pressure on traditional parties, which may find it difficult to win back their voters."
