= Christodoulides government =

14th Government of Cyprus

- 14th Government of Cyprus
- Incumbent
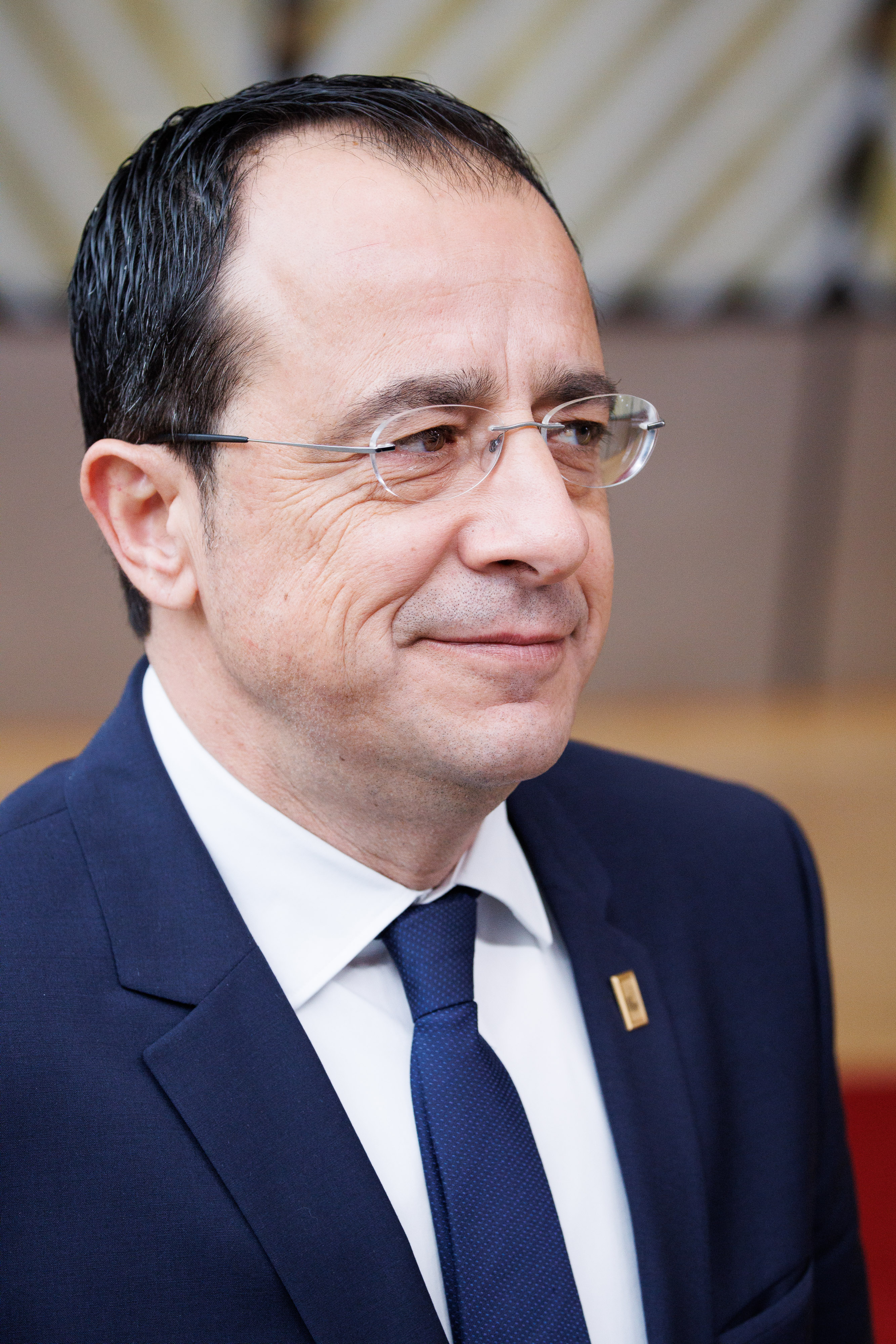
- Date formed: 28 February 2023

People and organisations
- Head of state: Nikos Christodoulides
- Head of government: Nikos Christodoulides
- Member parties: DIKO; DiPa (until 2026); EDEK (until 2026)
- Status in legislature: Coalition minority government (2023–2026); Minority government (2026–)
- Opposition cabinet: Demetriou Shadow Cabinet
- Opposition parties: DISY; AKEL; ELAM; ALMA; ADK
- Opposition leader: Annita Demetriou (2023–)

History
- Election: 2023 election
- Predecessor: Anastasiades II

The Cabinet (sworn in on 1 March 2023) formed by Nikos Christodoulides is the 14th Government of Cyprus and forms part of the Council of Ministers.

In the House of Representatives, the Government is in a minority coalition with the Democratic Party, Movement for Social Democracy and the Democratic Alignment party.

The Cabinet comprises Ministers affiliated with the coalition parties represented in the House of Representatives, with the addition of the Solidarity Movement party (which lost all its seats in the 2021 elections). Notably, some Ministers are members of the Democratic Rally, one of the main opposition parties.

The inauguration ceremony of the new president took place on February 28, 2023 at a special meeting of the House of Representatives.

On January 8, 2024, Christodoulides announced a major reshuffle, changing his health, justice, defence and agriculture ministers. The ministers were sworn on January 10. He faced heavy criticism for his removal of the Minister of Defense, Michalis Giorgallas.

On June 17, 2024, he established the Deputy Ministry of Immigration, and, two days later, appointed Nikolas Ioannides as the first Deputy Minister.

On November 9, 2024, Annita Demetriou, the leader of the opposition, announced the establishment of a shadow cabinet for the first time in the history of Cyprus.

In the 2026 legislative elections, two of the three parties supporting Christodoulides’ government, DIPA and EDEK, failed to reach the 3.6% threshold required to secure a parliamentary seat, leaving the president with a minority government supported solely by DIKO.

== Council of Ministers ==
Office	Name	Period	Party
President	Nikos Christodoulides	28 Feb 2023 –	Independent
Minister of Foreign Affairs	Constantinos Kombos	1 Mar 2023 –	Independent
Minister of Interior	Constantinos Ioannou (el)	1 Mar 2023 –	DISY
Minister of Finance	Makis Keravnos	1 Mar 2023 –	DIKO
Minister of Energy, Commerce and Industry	George Papanastasiou	1 Mar 2023 – 8 Dec 2025	Independent
Minister of Energy, Commerce and Industry	Michalis Damianos (el)	8 Dec 2025 –	DIKO
Minister of Labour and Social Insurance	Giannis Panagiotou	1 Mar 2023 – 8 Dec 2025	DIKO
Minister of Labour and Social Insurance	Marinos Moushouttas (el)	8 Dec 2025 –	DIPA
Minister of Agriculture, Rural Development and Environment	Petros Xenophontos	1 Mar 2023 – 10 Jan 2024	Independent
Minister of Agriculture, Rural Development and Environment	Maria Panayiotou	10 Jan 2024 –	EDEK
Minister of Education, Youth and Sports	Athena Michailidou	1 Mar 2023 –	Independent
Minister of Justice and Public Order	Anna Koukidis-Prokopiou	1 Mar 2023 – 10 Jan 2024	DIKO
Minister of Justice and Public Order	Marios Hartsiotis (el)	10 Jan 2024 – 8 Dec 2025	Independent
Minister of Justice and Public Order	Costas Fytiris	8 Dec 2025 –	
Minister of Defence	Michalis Giorgallas (el)	1 Mar 2023 – 10 Jan 2024	Solidarity
Minister of Defence	Vasilis Palmas (el)	10 Jan 2024 –	DIKO
Minister of Transport, Communications and Works	Alexis Vafiadis (el)	1 Mar 2023 –	DISY
Minister of Health	Popi Kanaris	1 Mar 2023 – 10 Jan 2024	Independent
Minister of Health	Michalis Damianos (el)	10 Jan 2024 – 8 Dec 2025	DIKO
Minister of Health	Neophytos Charalambides	10 Jan 2024 –	DIKO
Government Spokesperson	Constantinos Letympiotis (el)	1 Mar 2023 –	DISY
Deputy Minister to the President	Irini Piki	1 Mar 2023 –	Independent
Deputy Minister of Shipping	Marina Hatzimanoli	1 Mar 2023 –	DISY
Deputy Minister of Tourism	Kostas Koumis	1 Mar 2023 –	DISY
Deputy Minister of Research, Innovation and Digital Policy	Philip Hadzizacharia	1 Mar 2023 – 10 Jan 2024	Independent
Deputy Minister of Research, Innovation and Digital Policy	Nikodimos Damianou	10 Jan 2024 –	Independent
Deputy Minister of Social Welfare	Marilena Evangelou	1 Mar 2023 – 8 Dec 2025	Independent
Deputy Minister of Social Welfare	Clea Hadjistephanou Papaellina	8 Dec 2025 –	
Deputy Minister of Culture	Michalis Hatzigiannis	1 Mar 2023 – 11 Jul 2023	Independent
Deputy Minister of Culture	Vasiliki Kassianidou	11 Jul 2023 –	Independent
Deputy Ministry of Immigration (Established on June 17, 2024)	Dr. Nikolas Ioannides (el)	19 Jun 2024 –	Independent
Deputy Government Spokesperson	Doxa Komodoromou	1 Mar 2023 – 25 Sept 2023	DISY
Deputy Government Spokesperson	Yiannis Antoniou	25 Sept 2023 –	
Gender Equality Commissioner	Jozi Christodoulou	1 Mar 2023 –	Independent
Environment Commissioner	Maria Panayiotou	1 Mar 2023 – 10 Jan 2024	EDEK
Environment Commissioner	Antonia Theodosiou	10 Jan 2024 –	Movement of Ecologists – Citizens' Cooperation
