= Akis Cleanthous =

Cypriot politician and financial analyst

Akis Cleanthous (1964 – April 11, 2011) was a Cypriot politician and financial analyst. Cleanhous was the chairman of the Cyprus Stock Exchange from 2003 to 2007 and Minister of Education and Culture from 2007 until 2008. He was a member of the Democratic Party (DIKO), a center-right political party.

== Biography ==
Cleanthous was born in 1964 in Argaka, Paphos District, Cyprus. He received a bachelor's degree in marketing management from Baruch College in New York City. Cleanthous then obtained a Master of Business Administration (MBA) in quantitative analysis from St. John's University in Queens, New York.

Cleanthous initially worked as banker, specializing in electronic banking, before moving into the Cypriot Internet Technology sector. He was appointed the chairman of the Cyprus Stock Exchange (CSE) in 2003 by the Council of Ministers. He remained the head of the CSE until February 20, 2007, when he was appointed Minister of Education and Culture.

In February 2007, Cleanthous was appointed the Minister of Education and Culture within the government of President Tassos Papadopoulos. He remained in that position until the Cypriot presidential election in February 2008, when he was succeeded as minister by Andreas Demetriou. A former member of the House of Representatives of Cyprus for the DIKO, Cleanthous was the head of the party's political planning bureau and a member of DIKO's executive committee. He also was the chairman of the Spyros Kyprianou Institute, a Cypriot think tank named for Spyros Kyprianou.

Outside politics Cleanthous took a position as the managing director of Evresis Loyalty Management in 2008. Cleanthous also was the chairman of Sea Star Capital Plc and as a member of the board of directors of the Nicosia Chamber of Commerce and Industry.

Cleanthous died of a heart attack on April 11, 2011, at the age of 46. At the time of his death, Cleanthous had been scheduled to stand for election in the 2011 Cypriot legislative election on May 22, 2011.

Cleanthous' funeral was held at the Saint Sophia Church in Strovolos. Dignitaries in attendance included Cypriot President Demetris Christofias. He was buried at St. Nicolaos cemetery. Cleanthous was survived by his wife, Christiana Cleanthous, and son, Evangelos.
