= Council of Ministers (Cyprus) =

Executive branch of the Cypriot government

The Council of Ministers is the executive branch of the Cypriot government, consisting of ministers. The council is chaired by the President of Cyprus and the ministers head executive departments of the government. The President and his ministers administer the government and the various public services.

== Current Council ==
Christodoulides government
- 14th Government of Cyprus
- Incumbent
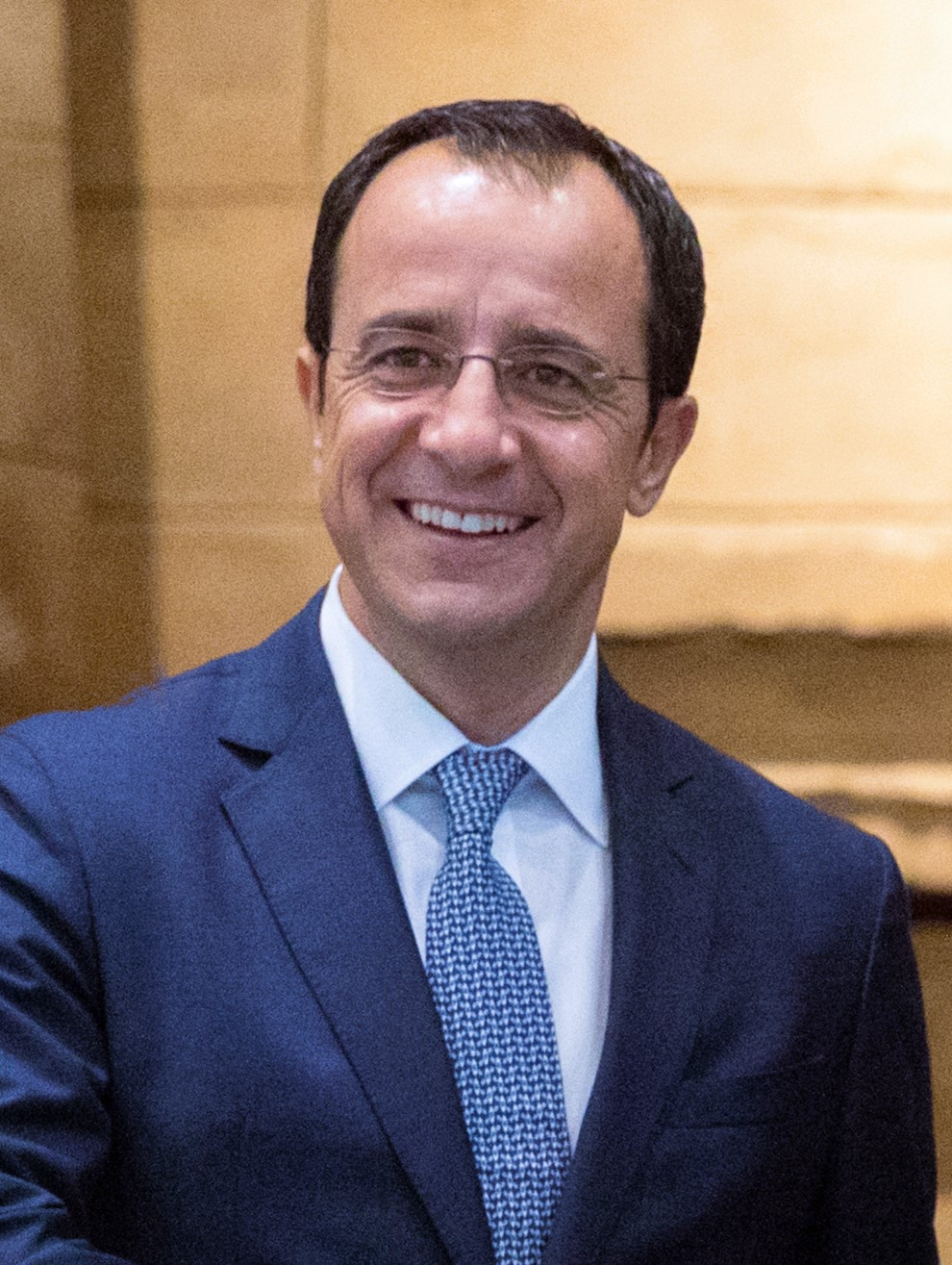
- Date formed: 1 March 2023

People and organisations
- Head of state: Nikos Christodoulides
- Head of government: Nikos Christodoulides
- Member parties: Independent Support From: DIKO; EDEK; DHPA; Solidarity Movement
- Opposition parties: Democratic Rally; AKEL; ELAM; KOSP; Volt
- Opposition leader: Averof Neofytou; Stefanos Stefanou

History
- Election: 2023 election
- Predecessor: Second Anastasiades government
- Successor: Christodoulides government

The Christodoulides government is the government of Cyprus, forming the Council of Ministers. Sworn in on 1 March 2023, it consists of members from various political parties and independent technocrats.

== Council of Ministers ==
Office	Name	Period	Party
President	Nikos Christodoulides	28 Feb 2023 – Incumbent	Independent
Minister of Foreign Affairs	Konstantinos Kompos	1 March 2023 – Incumbent	
Minister of Interior	Konstantinos Ioannou	1 March 2023 – Incumbent	
Minister of Finance	Makis Keravnos	1 March 2023 – Incumbent	
Minister of Energy, Commerce, Industry and Tourism	Giorgos Papanastasiou	1 March 2023 – Incumbent	
Minister of Labour and Social Insurance	Giannis Panayiotou	1 March 2023 – Incumbent	
Minister of Agriculture, Natural Resources and Environment	Maria Panayiotou	10 January 2024 – Incumbent	
Minister of Education and Culture	Athena Michailidiou	1 March 2023 – Incumbent	
Minister of Justice and Public Order	Marios Hartsiotis	10 January 2024 – Incumbent	
Minister of Defence	Vasilis Palmas	10 January 2024 – Incumbent	
Minister of Transport, Communications and Works	Alexis Vafiadis	1 March 2023 – Incumbent	
Minister of Health	Michalis Damianos	10 January 2024 – Incumbent	
Government spokesman	Konstantinos Letimpiotis	1 March 2023 – Incumbent	
Deputy Minister to the President	Irini Piki	1 March 2023 – Incumbent	
Deputy Minister of Shipping	Marina Hatzimanoli	1 March 2023 – Incumbent	
Deputy Minister of Culture	Michalis Hatzigiannis	1 March 2023 – Incumbent	
Deputy Minister of Tourism	Kostas Koumis	1 March 2023 – Incumbent	
Deputy Minister of Innovation, Research and Digital Policy	Nikodemos Damianou	10 January 2024 – Incumbent	
Deputy Minister of Migration and International Protection	Nicholas A. Ioannides	14 June 2024 – Incumbent	
