= Costas Kadis =

Cypriot politician (born 1967)

- Κώστας Καδής
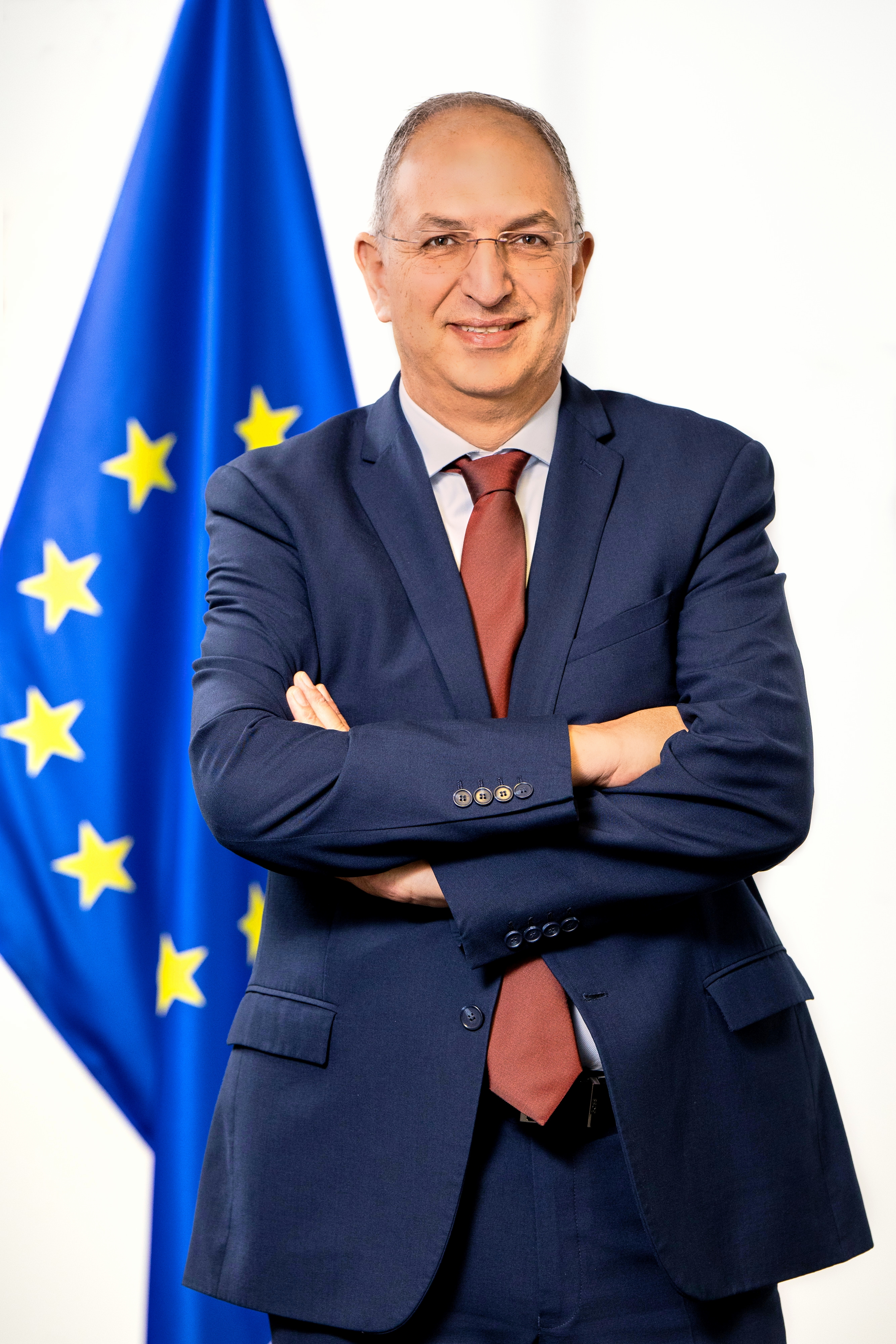
- Official portrait, 2024

European Commissioner for Fisheries and Oceans
- Incumbent
- Assumed office 1 December 2024
- Commission: Von der Leyen II
- Preceded by: Virginijus Sinkevičius

Minister of Agriculture, Natural Resources and Environment
- In office 1 March 2018 – 28 February 2023
- President: Nicos Anastasiades
- Preceded by: Nicos Kouyialis
- Succeeded by: Petros Xenophontos

Minister of Education and Culture
- In office 14 March 2014 – 28 February 2018
- President: Nicos Anastasiades
- Preceded by: Kyriakos Kenevezos
- Succeeded by: Costas Hambiaouris

Minister of Health
- In office 16 July 2007 – 28 February 2008
- President: Tassos Papadopoulos
- Preceded by: Haris Charalambous
- Succeeded by: Christos Patsalides

Personal details
- Born: Costas Kadis; 30 August 1967 (age 59) Nicosia, Cyprus
- Party: Independent
- Spouse: Marina Michailidou-Kadis
- Children: 2
- Education: National and Kapodistrian University of Athens
- Occupation: Biologist • Politician

Costas Kadis (Greek: Κώστας Καδής, pronounced [ˈkostas kaˈðis]; born 30 August 1967) is a Cypriot biologist and politician who has been serving as the European Commissioner for Fisheries and Oceans since December 2024. He previously served as the Cypriot Minister of Health (2007–2008), Minister of Education and Culture (2014–2018), and Minister of Agriculture (2018–2024). He is not a member of any political party.

== Early life and education ==
Kadis graduated from the University of Athens with a BSc in Biology in 1991. He received his PhD from the same university in 1995.

== Career ==
Kadis started his career in academia at the University of Athens and then moved back to his home country to work at the Research Promotion Foundation of Cyprus. In 2005, he established the Nature Conservation Unit at Frederick University.
