= Aggelidis =

Aggelidis is a surname. Notable people with the surname include:

- Grigorios Aggelidis (born 1965), German banker and politician
- Michael Aggelidis (born 1962), German politician

== See also ==
- Angelidis
