= Eleni Theocharous =

Cypriot politician and surgeon

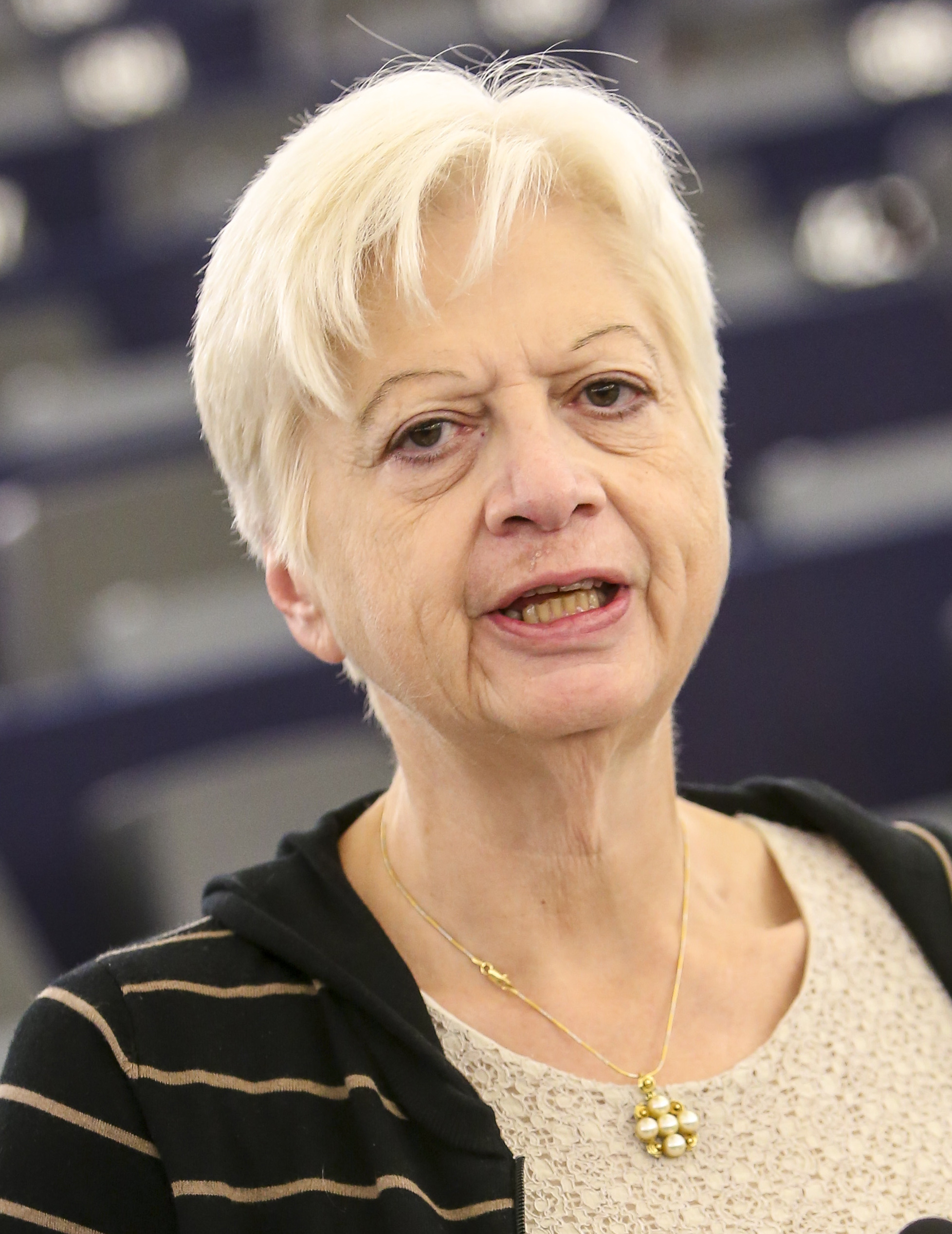

Member of the European Parliament for Cyprus
- In office 2009–2019

Member of the Cypriot Parliament for Limassol
- In office 2001–2009

Personal details
- Born: 24 June 1953 (age 73) Amiantos, Cyprus
- Party: Solidarity Movement (Cyprus)
- Other political affiliations: Democratic Rally (-2015)
- Spouse: Louis Kariolou (1978-2014)
- Children: 1
- Profession: Pediatric surgeon
- Website: www.elenitheocharous.com

Eleni Theocharous (Greek: Ελένη Θεοχάρους; born 24 June 1953) is a Cypriot paediatric surgeon and politician who leads the political party Solidarity Movement. She was elected to the European Parliament in 2009, re-elected in 2014 and served until 2019. Between 2001 and 2009, Theocharous was a member House of Representatives of Cyprus for the Limassol constituency.

== Early life and education ==
Theocharous was born in Amiantos on 24 June 1953.

== Politics ==
At the parliamentary elections of 27 May 2001 she was elected Member of the House of Representatives standing as a DISY candidate in Limassol and was re-elected at the parliamentary elections of 21 May 2006. She was deputy chairwoman of the House Standing Committee on Foreign Affairs and of the House Standing Committee on Health Affairs. She is currently a chairwoman of the House Standing Committee on Health Affairs and a member of the House Standing Committee on the Environment, of the House Standing Committee on Foreign Affairs and of the House Standing Committee on Human Rights. She is also a member of the delegation of the House to the Commonwealth Parliamentary Association. In 2003 she was appointed by the House as observer to the European Parliament, where she was a member of the Political Group of the European People's Party.

Mere months before the 2016 legislative election, Theocharous launched a splinter party, in opposition to President Anastasiades' approach to the Cyprus issue. She advocated for tighter co-operation with other Greek-Cypriot nationalist groups, particularly DIKO and EDEK. The new party was dubbed the Solidarity Movement. As of March 8, 2016, she is a member of the European Conservatives and Reformists. On 11 March 2016, it was announced that EVROKO would merge into the new party, placing its candidates on its lists in the 2016 election. On 26 May 2019, Theocharous lost her seat as MEP in the 2019 European Parliament election.

== Social and humanitarian activities ==
Theocharous was a member of the High Directorate of the "Médecins du Monde" international organisation and director of medical, environmental and provisional projects of the International Aid Fund in Brussels.

She is honorary president of the "Médecins du Monde - Cyprus" organization and a member of the Permanent Committee of the United Nations for the Promotion of Co-operation between Palestinian and Israeli Doctors. She is also a member of the executive committee of the International Union of Parliamentarians for the Defence of the Palestinian Cause.

== Literary work ==
Theocharous has published in literary magazines.

Her first collection of poems, "Poetic Act and Political Co-Act" (1991) earned her the award of the First State Prize for Poetry. In 1995, she published her second collection of poems: "Proxenos Thanatos Angele Mou" (Greek: Πρόξενος Θάνατος Άγγελε Μου). The third collection of short stories was «Tempelokalokairo» (Greek: Τεμπελοκαλόκαιρο) (Lazy summer). Her fourth collection of poems «Ellinosyron Magon» (Greek: Ελληνοσύρων Μάγων).

Many of her published poems and short stories have been translated in Armenian, Turkish, Russian and English.

In September 1992, she represented Cyprus at the 18th World Biennial of Poetry in Liège, Belgium.

In 1999, she published her third collection of poems "Oi Megaloi Tritoi" (Greek: Οι Μεγάλοι Τρίτοι, The Big Thirds) for which she was awarded, for the second time, with the First State Prize for Poetry.

== Honorary awards ==
Theocharous has been awarded the Gold Medal of Honour of Nagorno-Karabakh, the Gold Medal of the Democritus University of Thrace and the All Balkan Award of the Vardinoyiannis Foundation. She has received the First State Award for Poetry twice (1991 and 2000). The University of Minsk and the University of Syktyvkar have awarded her honorary doctorates. She has also received the "Margarette Golding" award of the Lions International and the "Paul Harris Fellow" title of the Rotary International, as well as various other awards.
