= Constantina Akkelidou =

Cypriot politician (born 1946)

- Ντίνα Ακκελίδου

Minister of Health
- In office 1 March 2003 – 26 November 2004
- President: Tassos Papadopoulos
- Preceded by: Frixos A. Savvides
- Succeeded by: Andreas Christou

Personal details
- Born: 29 March 1946 (age 80) Nicosia, Cyprus
- Party: Progressive Party of Working People (AKEL)
- Education: Patrice Lumumba Peoples' Friendship University of Russia
- Occupation: Politician, chemist

Constantina 'Dina' Akkelidou (Greek: Ντίνα Ακκελίδου; born 29 March 1946) is a Cypriot chemist and politician who served as Minister for Health in Cyprus from March 2003 to November 2004.

== Early life and career ==
Akkelidou was born in Nicosia, Cyprus. She studied chemistry at an undergraduate and postgraduate level, and became involved in leftist movements during her time as a student. She received a Master of Science in analytical chemistry from the Patrice Lumumba Peoples' Friendship University of Russia.

In 1989, Akkelidou became the director of the State General Laboratory, remaining in the role until 2003. She has also served on food safety committees for both the World Health Organization and the Food and Agriculture Organization,and as president of the Antinarcotic Council of Cyprus.

== Political career ==
On 1 March 2003, Akkelidou was appointed Minister of Health by President Tassos Papadopoulos, succeeding Frixos Savvides. In 2004 she sent a letter to a judge in Larnaca, requesting that the judge be lenient with a particular defendant, described as a reformed drug addict. On 26 November 2004, a Nicosia District Court found her guilty of interfering with the course of justice and fined her £1,000. She resigned the same day, and was later succeeded by Andreas Christou. In April 2005, the Supreme Court of Cyprus overturned her conviction in a 9–3 decision, prompting the resignation of Attorney General Solon Nikitas, who disagreed with the ruling.

In April 2005, Akkelidou was appointed special advisor to Markos Kyprianou, the European Commissioner of Health and Consumer Protection. In the 2006 legislative election, she was elected to the House of Representatives of Cyprus, representing the Nicosia constituency as a member of the Progressive Party of Working People (AKEL). She took office on 11 January 2007.
