= Maria Panayiotou =

Cypriot historian, professor and politician (born 1982)

- Μαρία Παναγιώτου
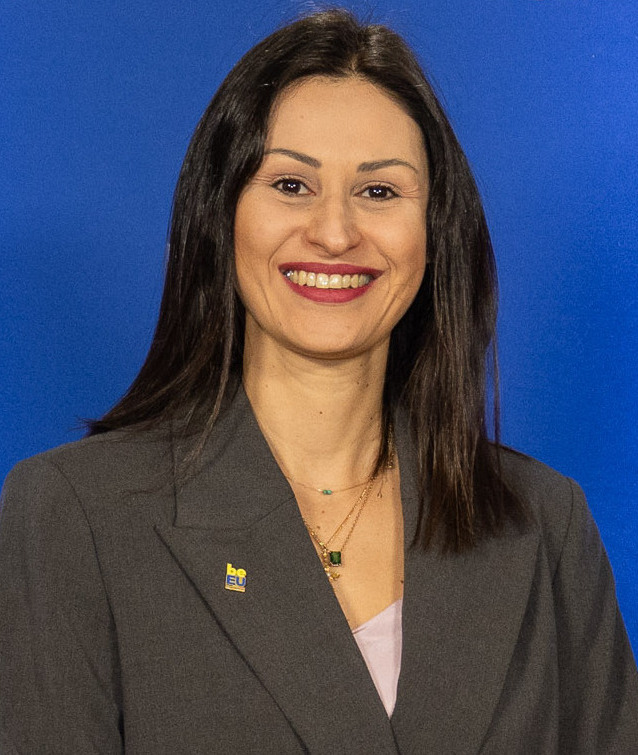
- Panayiotou in 2024

Minister of Agriculture, Rural Development and Environment
- Incumbent
- Assumed office 10 January 2024
- President: Nikos Christodoulides
- Preceded by: Petros Xenophontos

Personal details
- Born: 5 June 1982 (age 44) Larnaca, Cyprus
- Party: EDEK Socialist Party
- Education: University of Cyprus; University of Birmingham

Maria Panayiotou (Greek: Μαρία Παναγιώτου; born 5 June 1982) is a Cypriot historian, professor and politician, who has served as Minister of Agriculture, Rural Development and Environment of Cyprus since 2024. She previously served as Commissioner of the Environment between 2023 and 2024.

== Early life ==
Panayiotou was born on 5 June 1982 in Larnaca, Cyprus. She graduated in history and archaeology from the University of Cyprus in 2004, completed a postgraduate degree at the University of Birmingham in 2006, where she also obtained a master's degree in modern history of the eastern Mediterranean, and in 2017 she received her PhD in modern and contemporary history from the University of Cyprus.

== Career ==
Between 2004 and 2022, she worked on several funded research projects, and between 2017 and 2022, she taught economic history at the University of Cyprus. Panayiotou was press officer and spokesperson for the EDEK party between March 2016 and February 2023.

Her research has focused on the country's economic history, agricultural export trade, and British fiscal policy, as well as Cyprus' port infrastructure. Panayiotou has published several scientific articles and participated in conferences around the world.

She was Commissioner for Environment between March 2023 and January 2024. On 5 January 2024 Panayiotou was sworn in as the new Minister of Agriculture, Rural Development and Environment under president Nikos Christodoulides.

In April 2024, she promoted a national water investment plan with dozens of supply, irrigation, and reuse projects, valued at hundreds of millions of euros, to tackle drought and improve the management of water. In October 2024 she announced a new strategy for the primary sector with a budget of €109.3 million. In December 2025, there were rumors that she might be removed from her position as minister, but Christodoulides kept her on during a government reshuffle.

Panayiotou was appointed professor of Greek and literature in August 2025 and requested a one-year suspension due to incompatibility with her role as minister, which was accepted. She requested another suspension in February 2026, but her request was rejected.

After the 2025 Limassol wildfires, AKEL called for her resignation or dismissal in February 2026, criticizing her “failed” response to the fires, drought, and foot-and-mouth disease outbreak that began that same week. Faced with this outbreak affecting livestock, Panayiotou announced on 25 February a plan to vaccinate thousands of farm animals.

== Personal life ==
She has a son.
