= Christos Patsalides =

Cypriot politician

Christos Patsalides Χρίστος Πατσαλίδης

Cypriot Minister of Health
- In office February 2008 – August 2011
- President: Demetris Christofias
- Preceded by: Costas Kadis
- Succeeded by: Stavros Malas

Personal details
- Born: Pafos
- Profession: Lawyer, politician

Christos Patsalides is a Cypriot Lawyer, politician and a former Minister of Health of the Republic of Cyprus. He was also the president of the Sixty-fourth World Health Assembly.
