= List of ministers of health of the Republic of Cyprus =

The minister of health of the Republic of Cyprus is the head of the health sector of the island.

== Ministers of health ==
Since the establishment of the Republic of Cyprus, 18 persons have headed the ministry. They are:

- Androulla Agrotou
- Stavros Malas
- Niyazi Manyera
- Christos Patsalides
- Costas Kadis
- Charis Charalambous
- Andreas Gabrilides
- Constantina 'Dina' Akkelidou
- Frixos Savides
- Christos Solomis
- Manolis Christofides
- Panikos Papageorgiou
- Christos Pelekanos
- Andreas Mikkelides
- Giorgos Tombazos
- Christos Vakis
- Zenon Severis
- Michalis Glikis
- Tassos Papadopoulos
- Stella Soulioti
- Philippos Patsalis
- George Pamporidis
- Yiorgos Pamboridis, appointed 2015
- Michalis Hatzipantelas
- Popi Kanari
- Michalis Damianos
