= Nicos Kouyialis =

His Excellency Nicos Kouyialis Νίκος Κουγιάλης
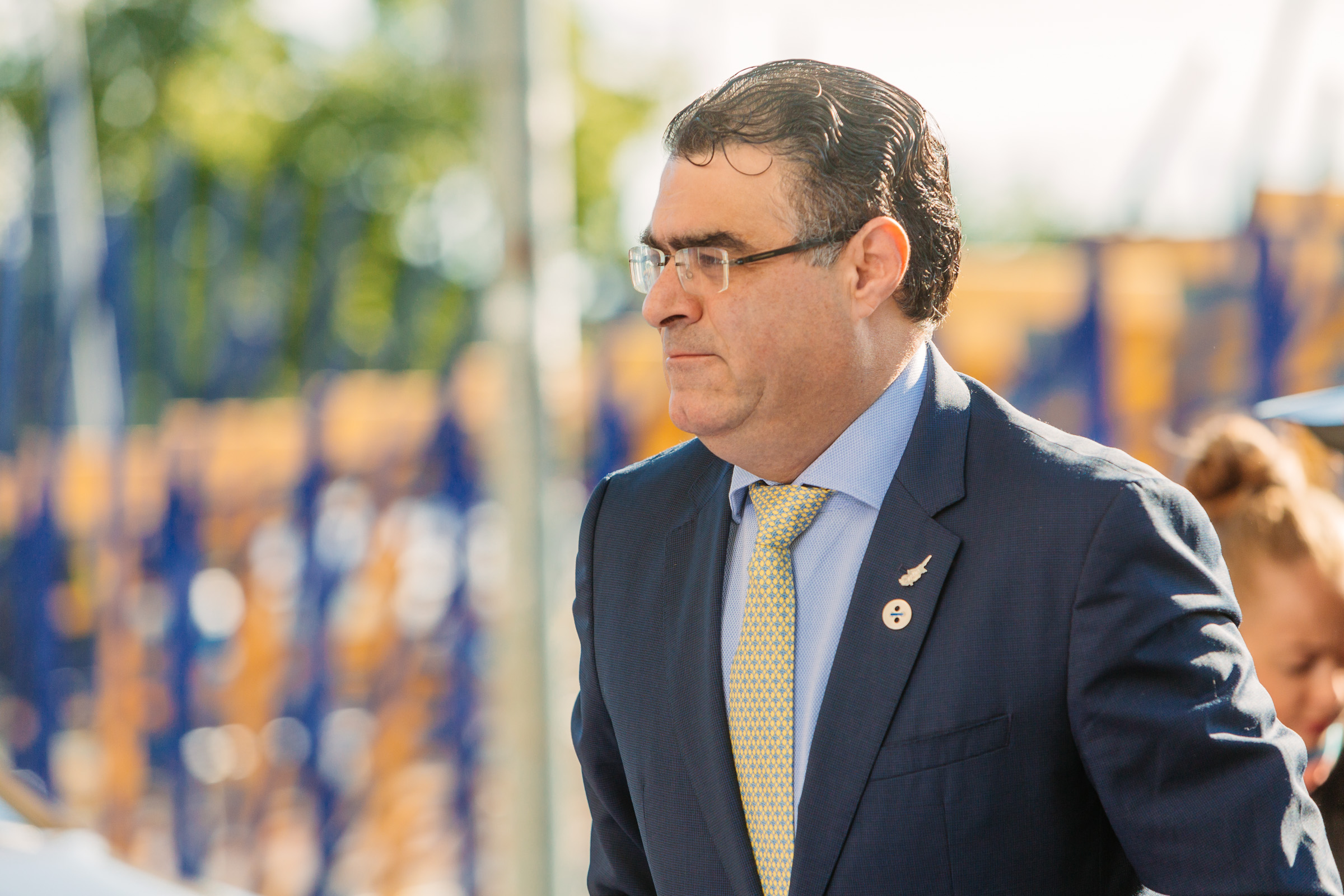

Minister of Agriculture, Rural Development and Environment of Cyprus
- In office 1 March 2013 – 28 February 2018
- President: Nicos Anastasiades
- Preceded by: Sophocles Aletraris
- Succeeded by: Costas Kadis

Personal details
- Born: 30 March 1967 (age 59) Nicosia, Cyprus
- Children: 3
- Education: Electrical Engineering and Telecommunications. North Carolina State University, United States
- Occupation: Management Consultant

Nicos Kouyialis is a Greek Cypriot politician. He served as Minister of Agriculture, Rural Development and Environment of Cyprus between 2013 and 2018.

== Biography ==
Nicos Kouyialis was born in Nicosia, Cyprus on March 30, 1967. He studied in the USA and he holds a BSc and MSc in Electrical Engineering from the North Carolina State University (NCSU). He was the Chairman of the Institution of Engineering and Technology (IET), UK and an elected member of the IET World Council. He also served as chairman of the Institution of Electrical Engineers (IEE), UK. He served unionism as the Assistant Secretary of the Professional Employees Union of the Electricity Authority of Cyprus (SEPAIK). He worked at the Electricity Authority of Cyprus as an Electrical Engineer. Previously, he worked for the IBM Research Triangle Park NC/USA, ALCATEL Network Systems NC/USA, Siemens Cyprus and the North Carolina State University as a lecturer in telecommunications.

== Political career ==
He was a member of the European Party (Cyprus), of which he was also Vice-President. On March 1, 2013, Nicos Kouyialis was appointed Minister of Agriculture, Rural Development and Environment of Cyprus in the government of Nicos Anastasiades. In August 2013, Cyprus signed an agreement with Greece and Israel to link the three countries’ electricity grids via an underwater cable and enforce the Energy Triangle plan. On April 22, 2016, Nicos Kouyialis represented Cyprus in the United Nations and signed the Paris Agreement on Climate Change. He has led the government's remarkable changes in the public's perception of recycling for promoting programs aimed at the reduction, reuse, and recycling of waste. During his term, he was actively involved with developing and applying EU policies to tackle water scarcity and climate change. Furthermore, he has shown a personal commitment and given real leadership to receive Protected Designation of Origin status for multiple Cypriot agriculture products and foodstuffs including Cyprus ‘Χαλλουμι’ (Halloumi)/‘Hellim’ cheese.
