= 2025 Limassol wildfires =

July 2025 wildfire in Cyprus

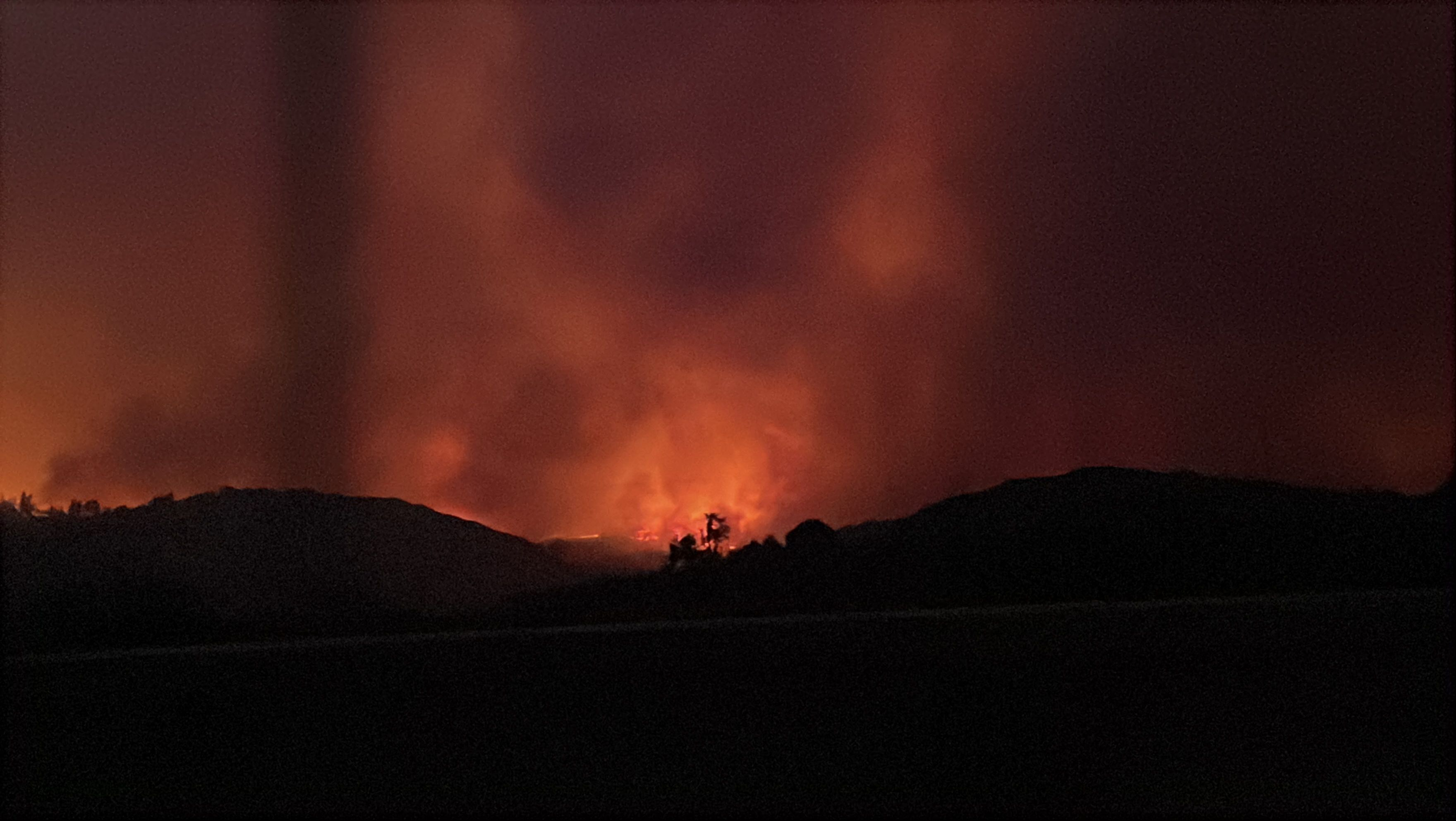
- Smoke rising over Malia on 24 July 2025
- Date: 23–24 July 2025
- Location: Malia, Cyprus
- Coordinates: 34.833°N 32.800°E

Statistics
- Burned area: 130 km^{2} (50 sq mi)
- Land use: Forest, agricultural, rural communities

Impacts
- Deaths: 2
- Injuries: 16+
- Evacuated: 16 Communities
- Livestock lost: Hundreds lost
- Structures destroyed: Completely Burned: 224 Partially Burned: 308 Total: 532

Ignition
- Cause: Accidental

Map
- Location of Malia in Cyprus

On 23 July 2025, wildfires broke out near the Cypriot village of Malia during a severe heatwave with temperatures exceeding 44 °C. The fires rapidly spread through the Limassol District throughout the day and night, destroying multiple villages and forcing evacuations in over a dozen areas.

A Cypriot couple was killed while fleeing in their vehicle, and multiple others were injured. Firefighting efforts involved more than 250 personnel and international assistance (after the 24th) from Jordan, Spain, Israel, Egypt, and the United Kingdom. Authorities originally suspected arson, with later investigations by the US Bureau of Alcohol, Tobacco, Firearms and Explosives International Response Team concluding that the wildfire was likely caused by a carelessly discarded cigarette coming into contact with dry vegetation, and classifying it as Accidental.

== Villages affected ==
Village / Area	Status	Notes
Malia	Evacuated	Near fire origin
Vasa Koilaniou	Evacuated	
Vouni	Evacuated	
Koilani	Evacuated	
Lofou	Evacuated	
Pera Pedi	Evacuated	Includes camping area
Monagri	Evacuated	
Agios Ambrosios	Evacuated	
Kyvides	Evacuated	
Souni-Zanakia	Evacuated	Large damage to residential buildings and infrastructure in the area of Souni-Zanakia
Agios Therapon	Evacuated	
Potamiou	Evacuated	
Agia Mavri	Evacuated	Camping area
Platres	Evacuated	Camping area
Sotira Limassol	Partial evacuation	
Ypsonas	Partial evacuation	
