= Androulla Agrotou =

Cypriot politician

Androula Agrotou Ανδρούλα Αγρότου

Minister of Health
- In office 15 October 2012 – 28 February 2013
- President: Demetris Christofias
- Preceded by: Stavros Malas
- Succeeded by: Petros Petridis

Personal details
- Born: 1 January 1947 (age 79) Nicosia, Cyprus
- Party: Progressive Party of Working People
- Education: University of Moscow

Androulla Agrotou (Greek: Ανδρούλα Αγρότου; born 1 January 1947), is a Cypriot medical doctor, politician and former Minister of Health of Cyprus.

Androula Agrotou was born in Nicosia in 1947. She graduated from the Pancyprian Pallouriotissa Gymnasium in 1965 and studied at the Medical School of the University of Moscow.

She holds a postgraduate degree in Public Health and Business Administration with an emphasis on Public Administration and holds the specialties of Hygiene - Community Medicine and General Medicine. In 1973, Agrotou became a Medical Officer at the Palaichori Health Center and subsequently at various Health Centers and First Aid Departments.

She then worked in the Department of Administration of the Ministry of Health, serving amongst other things the positions of the Senior Medical Officer and the First Medical Officer. Between 2007 and 2010 she served as Director of Medical Services and Public Health Services and she served as Deputy Director General of the Ministry of Health for a quarter before retiring (2010).

On 15 October 2012, was appointed Minister of Health of the Republic of Cyprus by decision of president Demetris Christofias.
