= Klairi Angelidou =

Cypriot educator, philologist, poet, translator, and politician (1932–2021)

- Κλαίρη Αγγελίδου

Member of the House of Representatives
- In office 30 May 1991 – 27 February 1993
- Constituency: Famagusta

Minister of Education and Culture
- In office 28 February 1993 – 8 April 1997
- President: Glafcos Clerides

Personal details
- Born: 19 November 1932 Famagusta, Cyprus
- Died: 1 April 2021 (aged 88)
- Party: Democratic Rally (DISY)
- Education: University of Athens
- Occupation: Educator

Klairi Angelidou (Greek: Κλαίρη Αγγελίδου) (19 November 1932 – 1 April 2021) was a Cypriot educator, philologist, poet, translator, and politician.

== Biography ==
Born in Ammochostos, Famagusta, Angelidou was educated at the School of Philosophy at the University of Athens. In 1955 she married Nicos Angelides, with whom she has three sons. She began her educational career as a teacher at a gymnasium in 1956, continuing until 1962, when she became assistant headmistress; she became headmistress in 1980 and remained in the position until 1991. An honorary member of the International Women's Association, she was also the Honorary President of the Cyprus Language Association and the Lions Club Arsinoe; she has received honorary degrees from the University of Athens and the University of Middlesex. She was elected to the House of Representatives in 1991. Two years later, she was appointed Minister of Education and Culture, in which role she continued until 1997. She has continued to be active in political affairs in retirement.

Angelidou has published fourteen volumes of poetry, and numerous works in a variety of other forms. Her poetry has been translated into numerous languages, and set to music by such composers as Marios Meletiou and George Theophanous.

== Selected publications ==
Her works include:

- Poiemata (1967)
- Tou Xerizomou (Uprooting) (1975)
- Nostimon Imar (1982)
- En Demo Anathountos (1988)
- Pentadaktylos, My Son (1991)
- The Silence of Statues (1994)
