= Athena Michailidou (Cypriot politician) =

Cypriot educator and politician

- Αθηνά Μιχαηλίδου
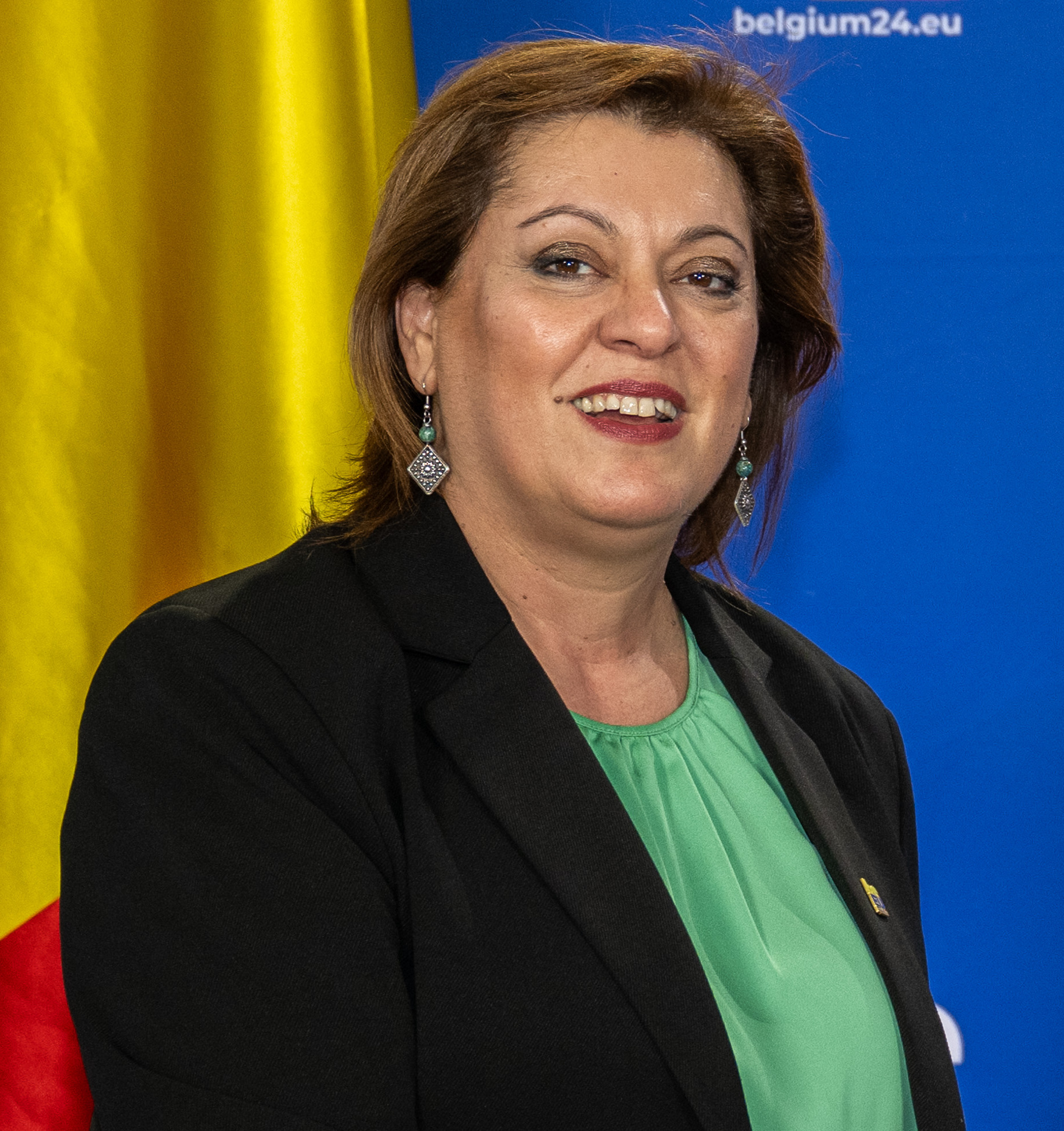
- Michailidiou in 2024

Minister of Education, Sports and Youth
- Incumbent
- Assumed office 1 March 2023
- President: Nikos Christodoulides
- Preceded by: Prodromos Prodromou

Personal details
- Born: Kyrenia, Cyprus
- Education: Aristotle University of Thessaloniki; University of London; University of Manchester; Pedagogical Academy of Cyprus

Athena Michailidou (Greek: Αθηνά Μιχαηλίδου) is a Cypriot educator and politician, who has served as Minister of Education, Sports and Youth since 2023.

== Early life ==
Michailidou was born in Kyrenia, Cyprus. She graduated in education from the Pedagogical Academy of Cyprus and holds a bachelor's degree from the Aristotle University of Thessaloniki, as well as a master's degree in education from the University of Manchester and a PhD in educational studies from the University of London, specialising in educational research and evaluation.

== Career ==
She has been a public school teacher and taught pedagogy at the Cyprus Pedagogical Institute, where she also became director, a position that allowed her to serve as acting permanent secretary of the Minister of Education, Sports and Youth and represent the Ministry in European Commission working groups. Michailidou has also collaborated with the Open University of Cyprus and the University of London.

In July 2022 Michailidou was appointed acting permanent secretary to the Deputy Minister of Culture.

On 27 February 2023, newly sworn in President of Cyprus Nikos Christodoulides announced the members of his cabinet, in which Michailidou was announced as the new Minister of Education, Sports and Youth. She was sworn in on 1 March. In an interview in August of that year, Michailidou stated that her priorities as minister were to integrate artificial intelligence, robotics and new technologies in general into the education system in order to achieve the technological transformation of education, as well as to strengthen students and teachers in the psychosocial area through special programmes to prevent violence in schools. In June 2023, the new University of Limassol was inaugurated.

She announced policies to promote talent in sports in January 2024. Between August 2024 and July 2025, Michailidiou served as the first Cypriot president of the European School. In November 2024, the government approved her national strategy for the prevention and management of violence in schools for the period 2024–2028.

In December 2025, she called as an "historic day" the approval by the House of Representatives of the Public Education Service Act and the approval of the regulation for the evaluation of teachers and educational work in primary and secondary education.

== Personal life ==
She is divorced and mother of two.
