= Malia, Cyprus =

Mallia Μαλλιά Malya
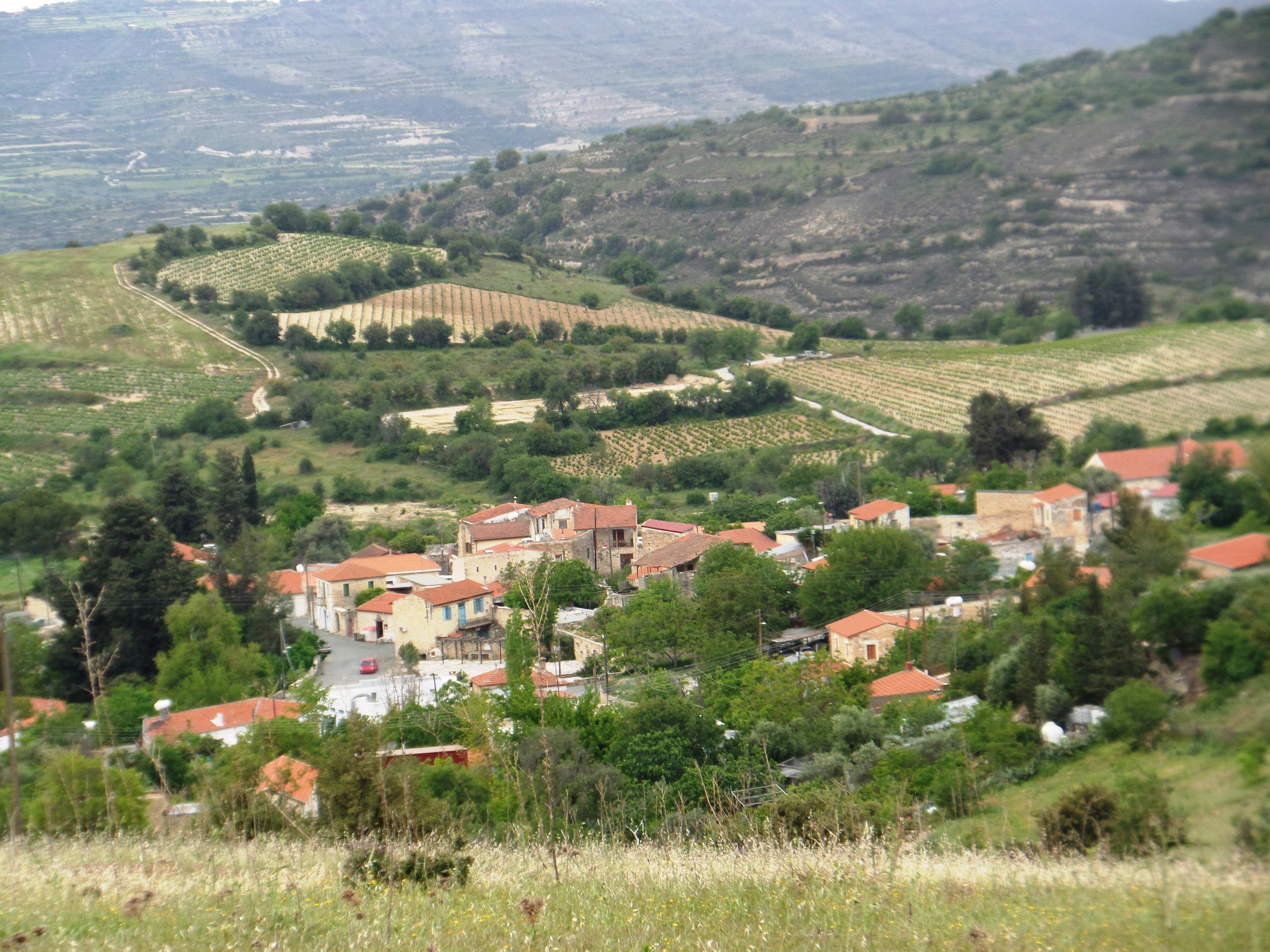

- Location in Cyprus
- Coordinates: 34°48′59″N 32°46′58″E
- Country: Cyprus
- District: Limassol District

Population (2001)
  - Total: 59
- Time zone: UTC+2 (EET)
  - Summer (DST): UTC+3 (EEST)

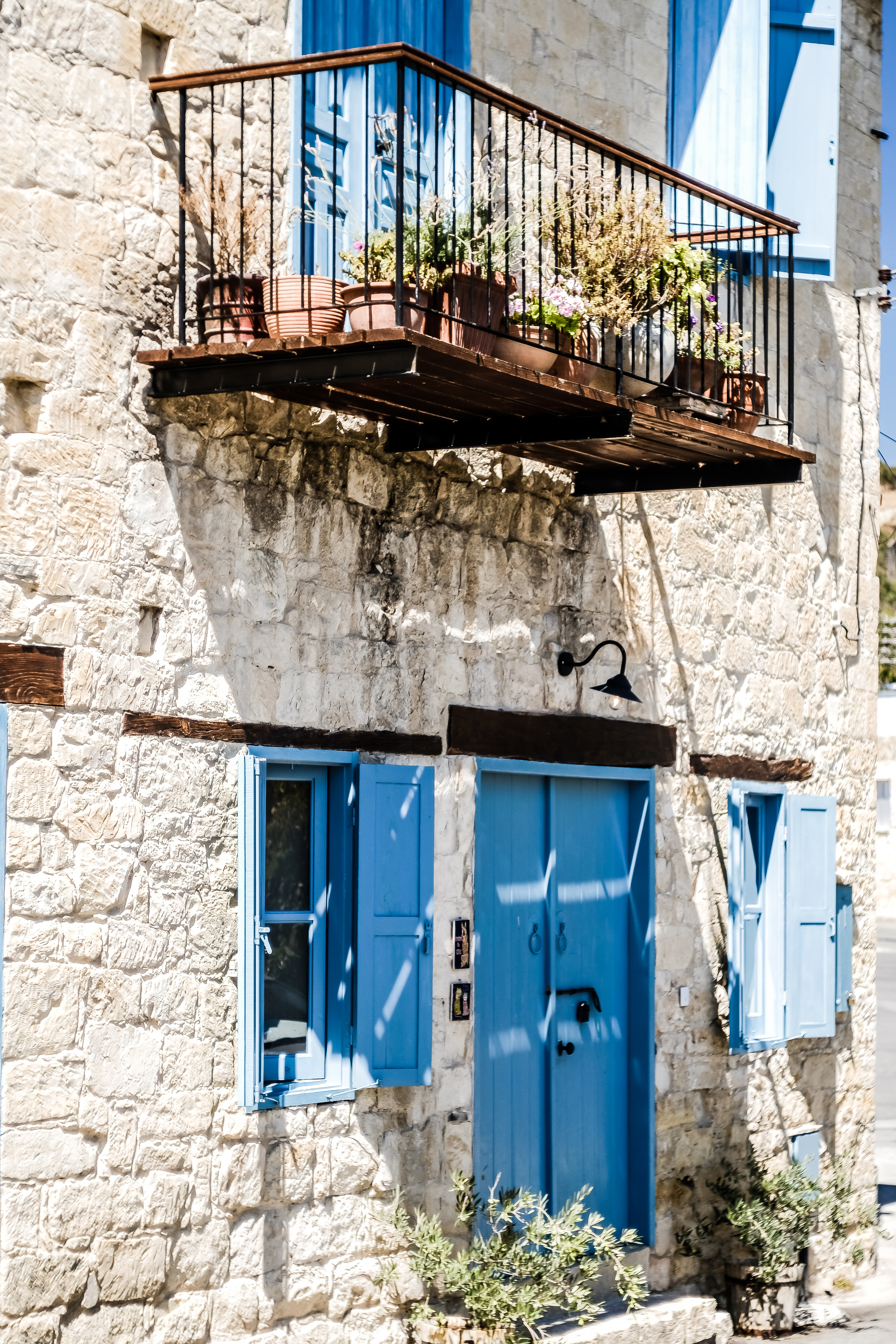
Malia village Cyprus

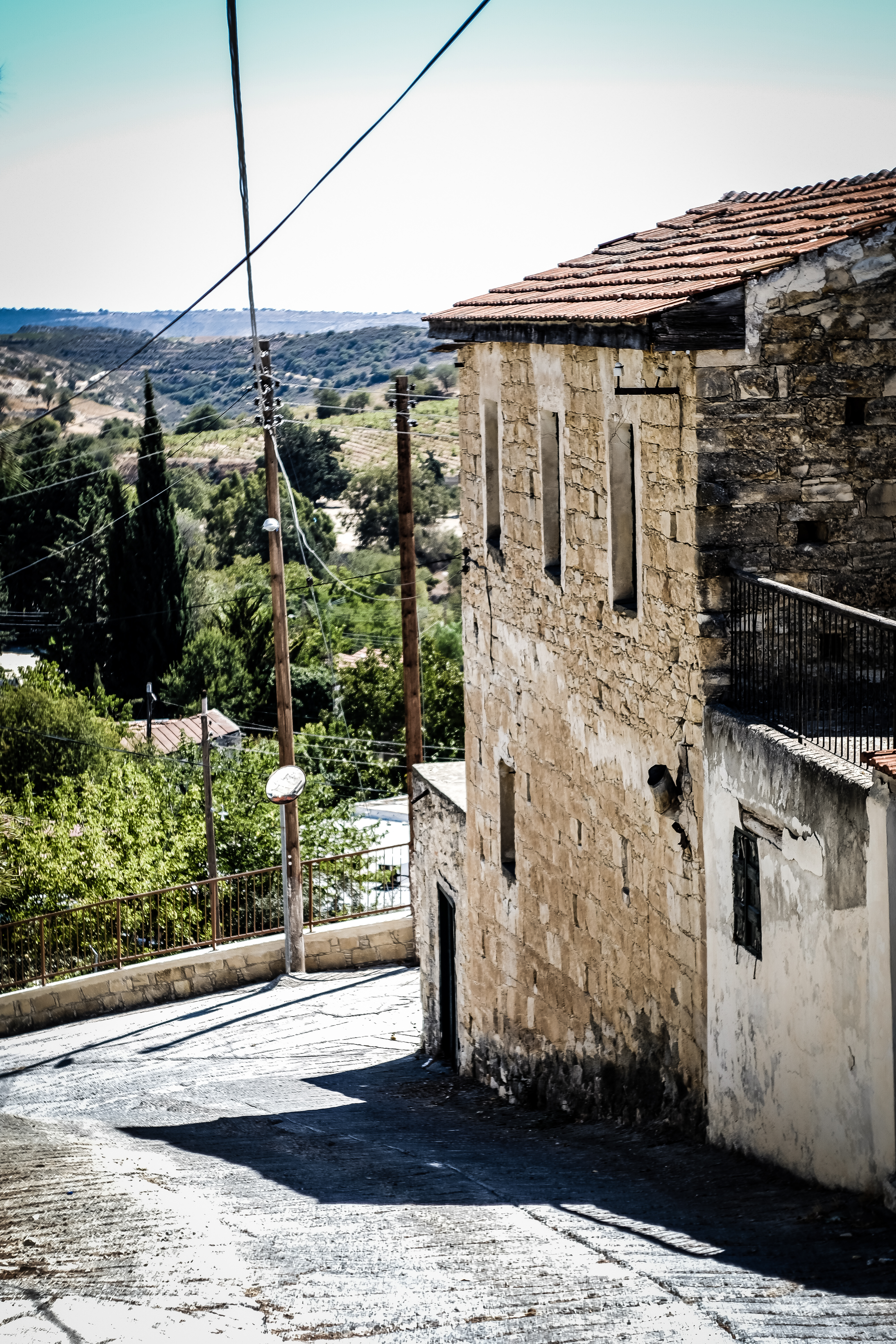

Malia (Greek: Μαλλιά, Turkish: Malya or Bağlarbaşı) is a village in the Limassol District of Cyprus, located 4 km south of Omodos.

The village is located south of Troodos wine area almost thirty kilometers northwest of the city of Limassol. The village’s name appears to come from the Greek "mallia," meaning "hair." Goodwin claims that "mallia" also means "sheep" in ancient Arcadian dialect. In 1958 Turkish Cypriots adopted the alternative name Bağlarbaşı, literally meaning something like "the best vineyard."

== History ==
As can be seen in the chart below, Malia was a mixed village from the Ottoman period. The population of the village increased throughout the British period, rising from 494 persons in 1891 to 712 in 1960. The Turkish Cypriots always constituted the clear majority in the village. In 1960, Turkish Cypriots made up 88% of the village’s population.

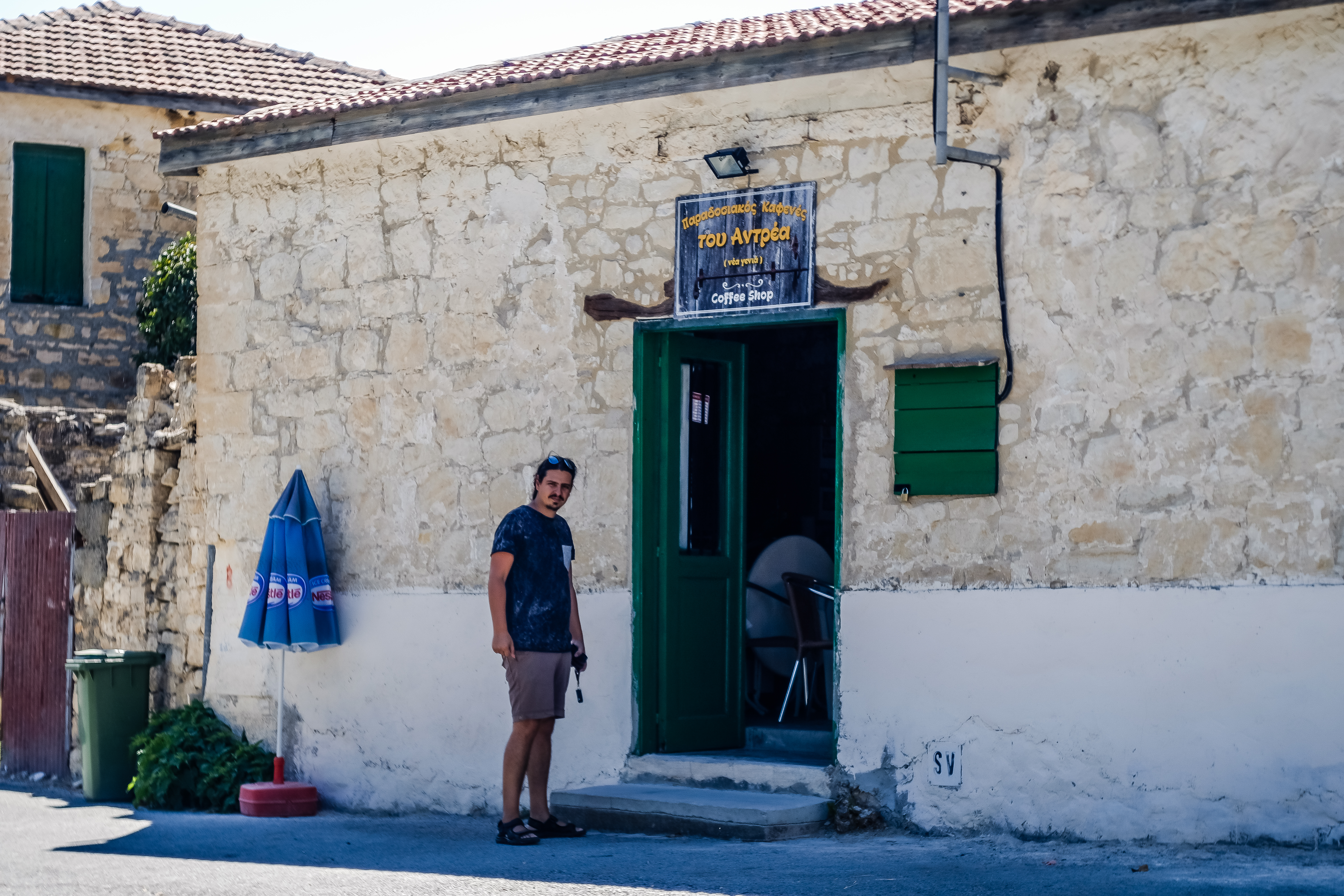

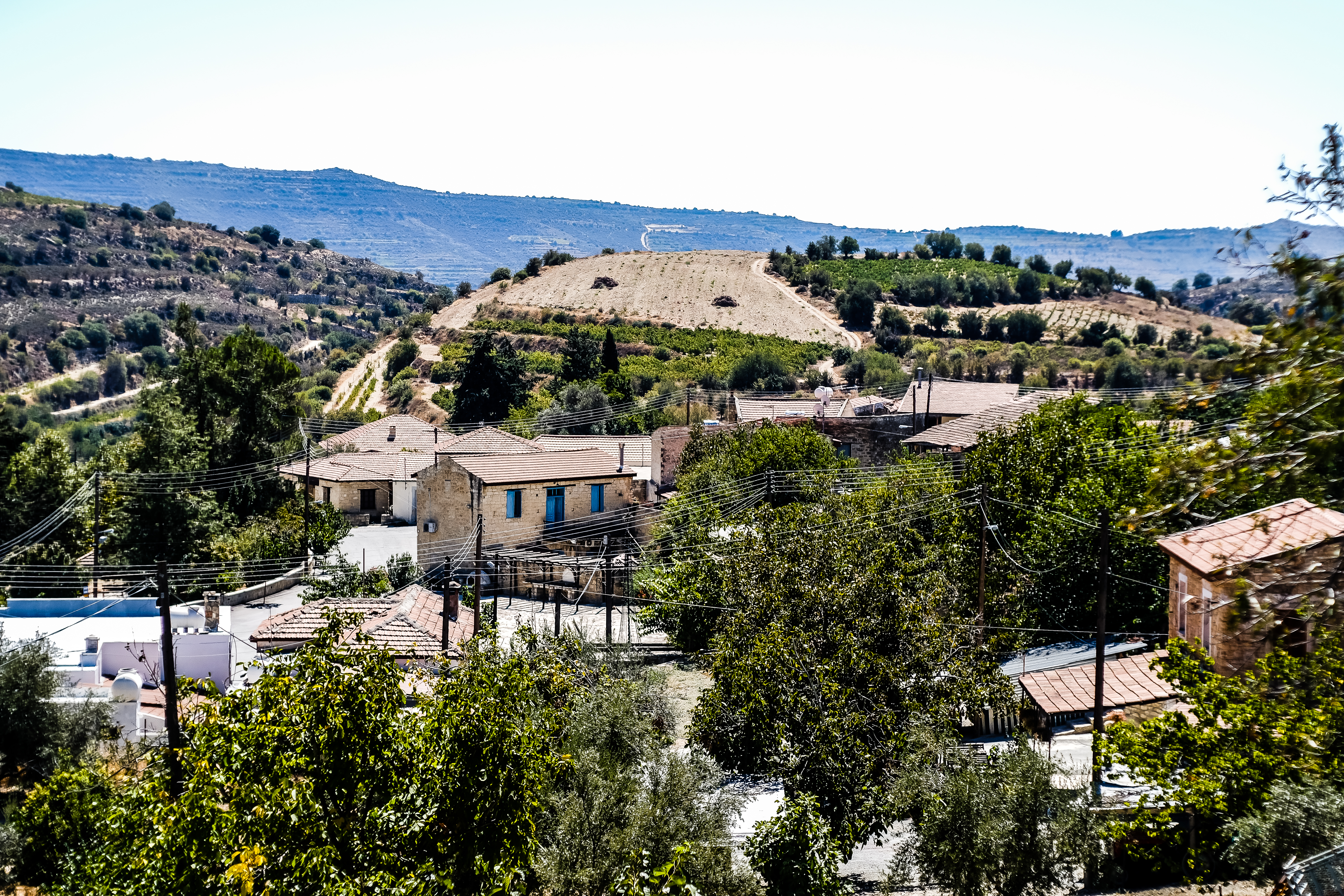

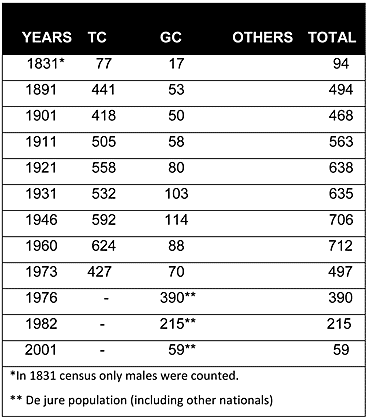

=== Displacement ===
No one was displaced during the emergency years of the late 1950s. However, in January 1963 about 300 Turkish Cypriots from the nearby villages of Prastio(279), Gerovasa(264) and Kidasi(310) (from Paphos district) sought refuge there. On 9 March 1964, following an attack by Greek Cypriot forces in which seven Turkish Cypriots were killed, approximately 1,000 Turkish Cypriots—both those from Malia and those who had taken refuge there—fled the village. They were scattered to the nearby villages of Avdimou/Düzkaya(260), Kantou/Çanakkale(265), Episkopi/Yalova(262), Kato Polemidia/Binatlı(277), Alektora/Gökağaç(256), Paramali/Çayönü(274), Mari/Tatlısu(363), Platanisteia/Çamlıca(276), Vretsia/Dağaşan(342) and Souskiou/Susuz(337). After 1968 many of the Malia Turkish Cypriots returned to their village, and Richard Patrick recorded 416 living there in 1971. The number of Turkish Cypriots of Mallia was 624 in 1960. Patrick also notes that the RoC government encouraged the return of the Malia Turkish Cypriots, along with Turkish Cypriot residents of three other grape-producing villages, because of the economic importance of the island’s wine industry and the fear that the large untended Turkish Cypriot vineyards would be destroyed. By December 1970 the RoC government claimed to have spent 6,719 pounds repairing 103 Turkish Cypriot houses in Malia that had been damaged and burned in March 1964.

In 1974, once again the entire Turkish Cypriot population of Malia fled the village, but this time to the Akrotiri British Base Area. They stayed there until February 1975, when they were transferred via Turkey to the northern part of the island, subsequently to be resettled in Prastio/Aydınköy(091) The total number of displaced Turkish Cypriots from Malia/Bağlarbaşı can be estimated to be 650-700 (624 in the 1960 census).

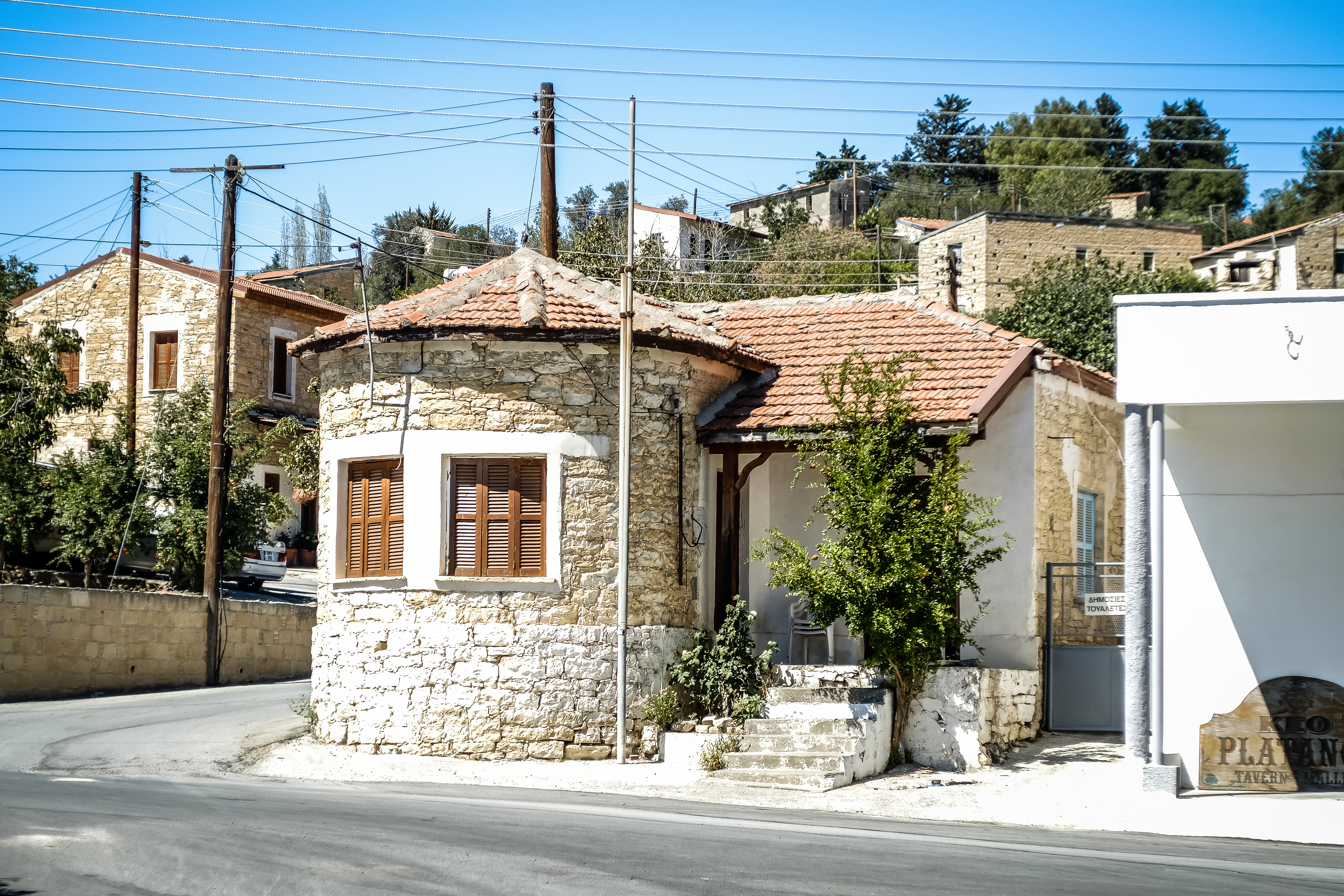

== Current population ==
Currently the village is mainly inhabited by its original Greek Cypriot inhabitants and displaced Greek Cypriots from the north. The last Cypriot census of 2001 put the total population at only 59.

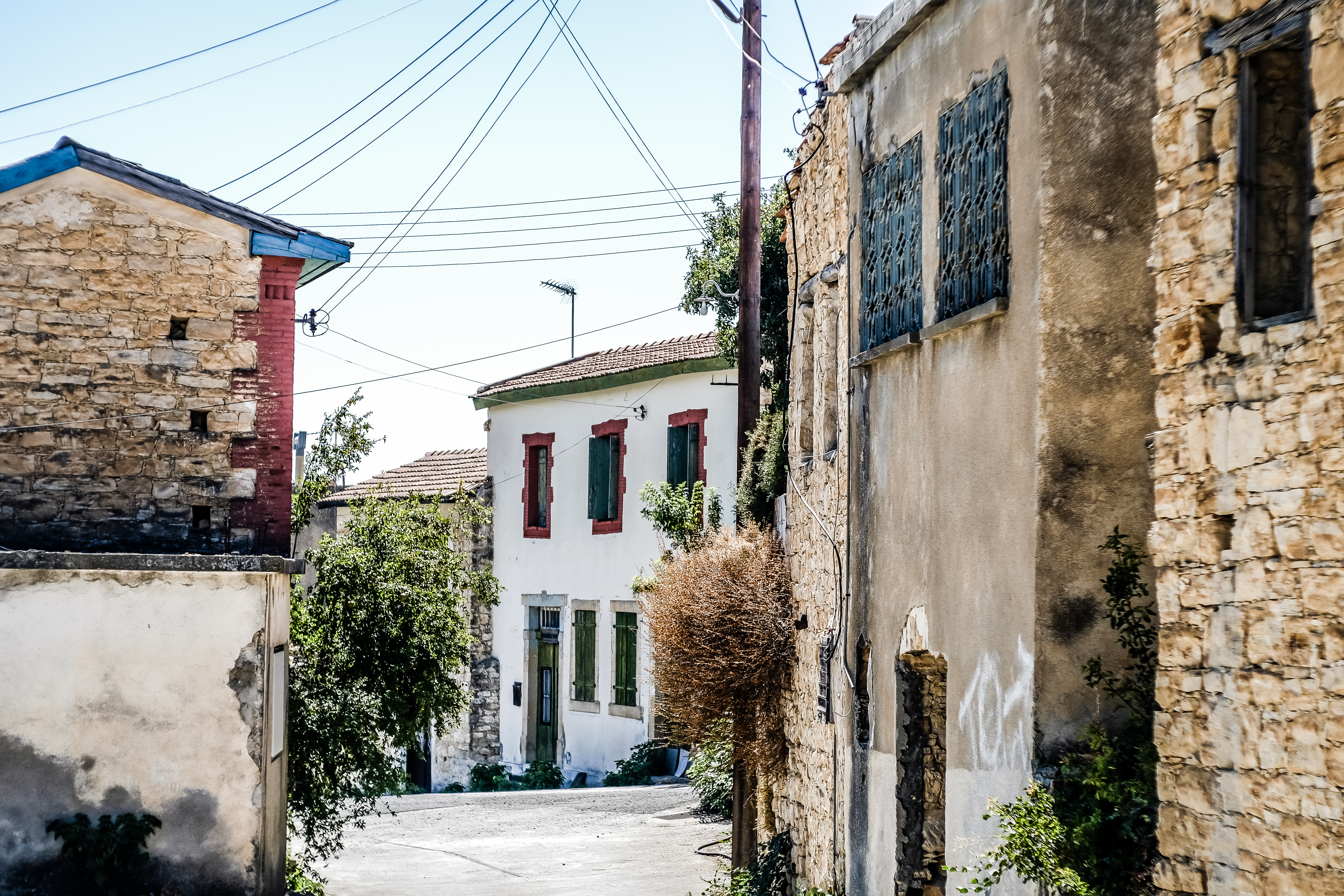

== Structures ==
The Mallia Winery is located in Malia village in Limassol region. It is owned and managed by the KEO Group. It is among the largest of the island’s regional wineries with an annual capacity of around 3 million bottles. The winery was established in 1928. In 1996 it was restored and 50 hectares of new vineyards planted which gave their first wines in 2001. Among their wide range of grapes Riesling is particularly interesting being otherwise unusual in Cyprus.

The mosque in the village of Malia dates to period: ca 1920, today it is not in use. Walls joined to boys’ school. Single room interior divided into three bays by rectangular pillars. Ceiling peaks under two pitched roof, lined in wood boards. i-beams support roof and link pillars transversely through space. First bay over doorway, covered with interior balcony supported on two flanking pillars. Balcony above separated 2/3 into harem (with lattice wood shutters) and 1/3 selamlik platform. Women’s side decorated with wood board pointed arches overlooking the main space. Three bays at lower level of platform also decorated with wood lattice pointed arches. All woodwork on the interior is painted in white and green stripes. Mihrab extruded from wall in simple grauful arc. Minaret accessible, concrete steps, stone exterior. Two pitched concrete porch on exterior.
