= Andreas Demetriou =

Greek Cypriot developmental psychologist (born 1950)

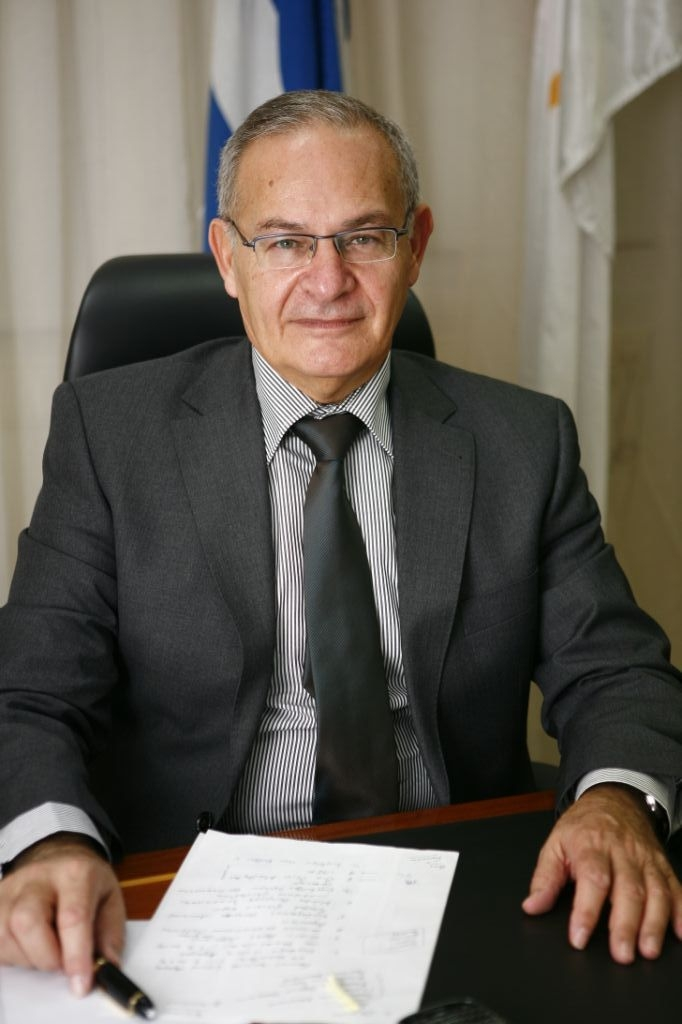
- Born: Andreas Panteli Demetriou; 15 August 1950 (age 76); Famagusta, Cyprus
- Education: Aristotle University of Thessaloniki, Greece
- Known for: Neo-Piagetian theories of cognitive development He proposed a comprehensive theory of cognitive development
- Scientific career
- Fields: Psychology; Cognitive psychology Developmental psychology
- Workplaces: University of Cyprus; Aristotle University of Thessaloniki and Cyprus University of Technology

Andreas Demetriou (Greek: Ανδρέας Δημητρίου; born Andreas Panteli Demetriou on 15 August 1950) is a Greek Cypriot developmental psychologist and former Minister of Education and Culture of Cyprus. He is a founding fellow and former president of The Cyprus Academy of Sciences, Letters and Arts.

== Life ==
Demetriou was born in Strongylo, Famagusta, Cyprus, on 15 August 1950. He is married to Julia Tsakalea and he has two sons, Pantelis and Demetris. After graduating from Pancyprian Gymnasium, the oldest secondary school in Cyprus, he went to Thessaloniki, Greece, where he studied psychology at the Aristotle University of Thessaloniki. He received a PhD in psychology in 1983. He was a professor of developmental psychology at the Aristotle University of Thessaloniki until 1996. He then moved to the University of Cyprus, where he was a professor of psychology until he became the Minister of Education and Culture. Currently he is professor of psychology and president of the University of Nicosia Research Foundation. He is also president of the Pancyprian Association of Psychologists.

== Research ==
His research focuses on cognitive development. From the very beginning he attempted to develop a comprehensive theory of cognitive development aiming to integrate the empirically valid aspects of Piaget's theory with psychometric and cognitive theory. That is, the theory aimed to describe and explain intellectual development through the life span, individual differences in the rate and directions of intellectual development, and the cognitive mechanisms underlying development and individual differences. According to this theory, the human mind is organised in three functional levels. The first is the level of processing potentials, which involves information processing mechanisms underlying the ability to attend to, select, represent, and operate on information. The other two levels involve knowing processes, one oriented to the environment and another oriented to the self. The level oriented to the environment includes thought processes and functions that specialise in the representation and processing of information coming from different domains of the environment. Six domains are specified: Categorical, quantitative, causal, spatial, propositional, and social thought. The self-oriented level includes functions and processes oriented to monitoring, representing, and regulating processing potentials and the environment-oriented systems. It underlies executive control and planning and it generates self-perceptions that converge on a self-image that shape how we view and avail ourselves to problem solving and social interactions. Recently, he studies the relations between intellectual development and personality development and also the relations between intellectual development and brain development. He is also working on the educational applications of his theory., This theory is presented in more than 180 books and articles, such as (1) The Architecture and Dynamics of Developing Mind, (2) The Development of Mental Processing , and (3) Unity and Modularity in the Mind and the Self. The journals New Ideas in Psychology Developmental Review, Developmental Science, Educational Psychology Review, and Intelligence, devoted special issues in the discussion of aspects of his theory.

== Present ==
As a Minister of Education and Culture from March 2008 to August 2011 he led a large programme of reforms in Cypriot education which includes the development of new curricula across all subjects and grades from preschool to senior high school and the expansion of the university system of the country. He also contributed to elevating Cypriot universities into regional centres of excellence and co-operation. Moreover, he reformed the system of cultural governance so that creators and people of culture are involved in the decision making mechanisms concerning arts and culture. Finally, he attempted to improve the efficiency of the Ministry through a series of changes in its administrative operation.

== List of achievements ==
=== Appointments ===
- 1975–1996 – He taught psychology from all ranks at the Department of Psychology and Education and then the School of Psychology, Aristotelian University of Thessaloniki.
- 1992–1994 – Chairman of the School of Psychology, Aristotelian University of Thessaloniki.
- 1996–2008 – Professor of Psychology, University of Cyprus.
- 1996–1998 – Chairman of the Department of Educational Sciences, University of Cyprus.
- 1999–2002 – Vice-Rector and Acting Rector of the University of Cyprus.
- 2003–2004 – Dean of the School of Humanities and Social Sciences, University of Cyprus.
- 2004–2006 – Dean of the School of Social Sciences and Sciences of Education, University of Cyprus.
- 2004–2008 – Founding President of the Interim Governing Board of the Cyprus University of Technology.
- 2006–2008 – President of the Conference of Rectors of Cyprus Universities.
- 2008–2011 – Minister of Education and Culture of the Republic of Cyprus.
- 2011–2016 – President, University of Nicosia Research Foundation.
- 2012–2017 – President of the Pancyprian Association of Psychologists.
- 2018– – Editorial board of Intelligence.

=== Honors ===
- 2001 – Distinguished Visiting Professor, Faculty of Education, University of Fribourg, Switzerland.
- 2004 – Fellow of the International Academy of Education http://www.iaoed.org/.
- 2009 – Honorary Visiting Professor of the Northeastern Normal University, Changchun, Jilin Province, China.
- 2010 – Doctor of the University Honoris Causa, Middlesex University, London, United Kingdom.
- 2011 – Honorary President of the Pancyprian Psychological Association.
- 2011 – Initiative Founder Award, Awarded at the Eduvision 2020 Conference, 16 September 2011, Bucharest, Romania.
- 2012 – Fellow of Academia Europaea.
- 2017 – Fellow of Association for Psychological Science.
- 2019 – Founding Fellow of Cyprus Academy of Sciences, Letters, and Arts.
- 2020 – President of Cyprus Academy of Sciences, Letters, and Arts.

== List of major works ==
- Demetriou, A. (Ed.), (1988). The neo-Piagetian theories of cognitive development: Toward an integration. Amsterdam: North-Holland.
- Demetriou, A., (2000). Organization and development of self-understanding and self-regulation: Toward a general theory. In M. Boekaerts, P. R. Pintrich, & M. Zeidner (Eds.), Handbook of self-regulation (pp. 209–251). Academic Press.
- Demetriou, A., & Bakracevic, K. (2009). Cognitive development from adolescence to middle age: From environment-oriented reasoning to social understanding and self-awareness. Learning and Individual Differences, 19, 181–194.
- Demetriou, A., Christou, C., Spanoudis, G., & Platsidou, M. (2002). The development of mental processing: Efficiency, working memory, and thinking. Monographs of the Society for Research in Child Development, 67, Serial Number 268.
- Demetriou, A., Efklides, A., & Platsidou, M. (1993). The architecture and dynamics of developing mind: Experiential structuralism as a frame for unifying cognitive developmental theories. Monographs of the Society for Research in Child Development, 58 (5, Serial No. 234).
- Demetriou, A., & Kazi, S. (2001). Unity and modularity in the mind and the self: Studies on the relationships between self-awareness, personality, and intellectual development from childhood to adolescence. London: Routledge.
- Demetriou, A., & Kazi, S. (2006). Self-awareness in g (with processing efficiency and reasoning). Intelligence, 34, 297–317.
- Demetriou, A., Kazi, S., & Georgiou, S. (1999). The emerging self: The convergence of mind, self, and thinking styles. Developmental Science, 2:4, 387–409 (With commentaries by F. Marton, R. S. Sternberg, C. F. M. van Lieshout, E. C. Hair & W. G. Graziano, and J. Asendorpf).
- Demetriou, A., Kyriakides, L., & Avraamidou, C. (2003). The Missing link in the relations between intelligence and personality. Journal of Research in Personality, 37, 547–581.
- Demetriou, A., & Kyriakides, L., (2006). The functional and developmental organisation of cognitive developmental sequences. British Journal of Educational Psychology, 76, 209–242.
- Demetriou, A., Mouyi, A., & Spanoudis, G. (2008). Modeling the structure and development of g. Intelligence, 36, 437–454.
- Demetriou, A., Mouyi, A., & Spanoudis, G. (2010). The development of mental processing. Nesselroade, J. R. (2010). Methods in the study of life-span human development: Issues and answers. In W. F. Overton (Ed.), Biology, cognition and methods across the life-span. Volume 1 of the Handbook of life-span development (pp. 306–343), Editor-in-chief: R. M. Lerner. Hoboken, New Jersey: Wiley.
- Demetriou A., & Raftopoulos, A. (1999). Modeling the developing mind: From structure to change. Developmental Review, 19, 319–368 (published with peer commentary by Mark Bickhard).
- Demetriou, A.& Spanoudis, G. (2018). Growing minds: A developmental theory of intelligence, brain and education. London: Routledge.
- Demetriou, A., Spanoudis, G., & Mouyi, A. (2011). Educating the developing mind: Towards an overarching paradigm. Educational Psychology Review, DOI 10.1007/s10648-011-9178-3.
- Demetriou, A., Spanoudis, G., Christou, C., Greiff, S., Makris, N., Vainikainen, M. P., & Gonida, E. (2023). Cognitive and personality predictors of school performance from preschool to secondary school: An overarching model. Psychological Review, 130, 480–512. https://doi.org/10.1037/rev0000399
- Demetriou, A., Spanoudis, G., Greiff, S., Panaoura, R., Vainikainen, M.P., Kazi, S., & Makris, N. (2024). Educating the developing mind: A developmental theory of instruction. London: Routledge.
- Demetriou, A., Spanoudis, G., & Papadopoulos, T. (2024). The typical and atypical developing mind: a common model. Development and Psychopathology, 36, 1–13. https://doi.org/10.1017/S0954579424000944
- Kargopoulos, P., & Demetriou, A. (1998). Logical and psychological partitioning of mind: Depicting the same picture? New Ideas in Psychology, 16, 61–88 (with commentaries by J. Pascual-Leone, M. Bickhard, P. Engel, and L. Smith).
