= Stavros Malas =

Cypriot politician

- Σταύρος Μαλάς
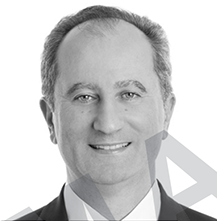

Minister of Health
- In office 5 August 2011 – 28 February 2013
- President: Demetris Christofias
- Preceded by: Christos Patsalides
- Succeeded by: Androulla Agrotou

Personal details
- Born: 10 June 1967 (age 59) Famagusta, Cyprus
- Party: Progressive Party of Working People
- Spouse: Zacharoulla Mala (1994–present)
- Children: 4
- Education: University College London Imperial College London

Stavros Malas (Greek: Σταύρος Μαλάς; born 10 June 1967) is a Cypriot geneticist, academic and politician who served in the government of Cyprus as health minister from 2011 to 2012. Previously, he was a Special Advisor to the European Commissioner for Health from 2008 to 2009.

Malas was appointed to the government of Cyprus as Minister of Health in August 2011. In June 2012, he decided to run as an independent candidate for the 2013 presidential election. In September 2012 he was officially declared as an independent candidate with the backing of AKEL. Having placed second in the first round of the elections with 26.91% of the votes, he made it to the runoffs that were held in February 2013. In the second round he lost to Nicos Anastasiades having received 42.52% of the votes.

Malas ran again as an independent candidate in the 2018 presidential election, regaining the support of AKEL. In the first round of the elections held on 28 January 2018 he received 30.24% of the votes, qualifying to the second round along with the then president Anastasiades who was applying for re-election. In the second round he lost to Anastasiades having received 44.01% of the votes.

Malas has served as the president of The Cyprus Institute since February 2023.
