= Costas Hambiaouris =

Cypriot politician

Minister of Education and Culture
- In office 1 March 2018 – 1 December 2019

Personal details
- Born: 1963 (age 61–62)

Costas Hambiaouris (Greek: Κώστας Χαμπιαούρης; born 1963) is a Cypriot politician. He served as Minister of Education and Culture from 1 March 2018 until 1 December 2019. In December 2019, he was appointed as the Mountain Communities Development Commissioner.
