= Angelides =

Angelides is a surname. Notable people with the surname include:

- Brendan Angelides, American electronic music producer and composer
- Chloe Angelides (born 1992), American singer-songwriter
- Phil Angelides (born 1953), American politician
- June Angelides (born 1984), British Investor

== See also ==
- Angelidis
