= List of ministers of Education, Sports and Youth of Cyprus =

This is a list of ministers of education and culture for the Republic of Cyprus since the independence in 1960.

| Minister | Begin | End |
|---|---|---|
| Konstantinos Spyridakis | 31 March 1965 | 30 June 1970 |
| Frixos Petrides | 1 July 1970 | 15 June 1972 |
| Andreas Kouros | 16 June 1972 | 16 July 1974 |
| Andreas Mikkelides | 8 August 1974 | 15 January 1975 |
| Andreas Mikkelides | 15 January 1975 | 4 October 1976 |
| Chrysostomos Sofianos | 5 October 1976 | 8 March 1978 |
| Chrysostomos Sofianos | 9 March 1978 | 9 September 1980 |
| Nicos Konomis | 10 September 1980 | 13 April 1982 |
| Panos Ioannou | 20 April 1982 | 22 September 1982 |
| Stelios Katsellis | 23 September 1982 | 6 January 1985 |
| Andreas Christofides | 7 January 1985 | 27 February 1988 |
| Andreas Philippou | 28 February 1988 | 3 May 1990 |
| Christoforos Christofides | 4 May 1990 | 27 February 1993 |
| Klairi Angelidou | 28 February 1993 | 7 April 1997 |
| George Hadjinikolaou | 8 April 1997 | 28 February 1998 |
| Lykourgos Kappas | 1 March 1998 | 4 January 1999 |
| Ouranios Ioannides | 5 January 1999 | 28 February 2003 |
| Peukios Georgiadesm | 1 March 2003 | 17 January 2007 |
| Akis Cleanthous | February 2007 | 29 February 2008 |
| Andreas Demetriou | 29 February 2009 | 5 August 2011 |
| George Demosthenes | 6 August 2011 | 28 February 2013 |
| Kyriakos Kenevezos | 1 March 2013 | 14 March 2014 |
| Costas Kadis | 14 Mar 2014 | 28 February 2018 |
| Costas Hambiaouris | 1 Mar 2018 | 1 December 2019 |
| Prodromos Prodromou | 3 December 2019 | 1 March 2023 |
| Athena Michailidou | 1 March 2023 | Incumbent |
