= Angelidis =

Angelidis, (Greek: Αγγελίδης) is a Greek surname. Notable people with the surname include:

- Dinos Angelidis (born 1969), Greek basketball player of mixed Greek-Austrian ancestry
- Mike Angelidis (born 1985), Canadian ice hockey player of Macedonian descent

== See also ==
- Angelides
