= Solidarity Movement (Cyprus) =

Greek Cypriot nationalist party in Cyprus

Solidarity Movement Κίνημα Αλληλεγγύη
- Leader: Eleni Theocharous
- Founder: Eleni Theocharous
- Founded: 15 January 2016
- Dissolved: 6 May 2026
- Merger of: European Party
- Split from: Democratic Rally
- Merged into: Democratic Party
- Headquarters: Nicosia
- Ideology: Greek Cypriot nationalism; National conservatism; Soft Euroscepticism
- Political position: Right-wing
- European affiliation: ACRE (2016–19); EAFD (2020–2023)
- European Parliament group: European Conservatives and Reformists (2016–19)
- Colours: Blue, Red

Website
- www.allileggii.com (archived)

The Solidarity Movement (Greek: Κίνημα Αλληλεγγύη, romanized: Kinima Allilengyi) was a Greek Cypriot nationalist party in Cyprus. It was founded in 2016 by Eleni Theocharous.

Theocharous departed the conservative Democratic Rally in November 2015, in protest to their support of a bizonal, bifederal settlement to the Cyprus problem. She established the Solidarity Movement in January 2016 and right-wing Evroko merged with the party in March of the same year. The Solidarity Movement is contesting 56 seats in the 2016 Cypriot legislative election.

On 9 March 2016, Eleni Theocharous joined the Alliance of European Conservatives and Reformists, after she retired from the Democratic Rally and the European People's Party. The party lost its one and only seat on 26 May 2019, in the 2019 European Parliament election.

On 6 May 2026, Eleni Theocharous announced the dissolution of the Solidarity Movement and endorsed the Democratic Party for the 2026 legislative election, calling on Solidarity Movement supporters to join forces with the party.

== Electoral results ==
=== Parliament ===
House of Representatives
Election	Votes			Seats	
Election	#	%	Rank	#	±
2016	18,424	5.24	6th	3 / 56	new
2021	8,254	2.31	10th	0 / 56	▼3
