= List of members of the parliament of Cyprus, 2026–2031 =

This is a list of the current 56 members of the House of Representatives of Cyprus, following the 2026 Cypriot legislative election.

The House of Representatives (Greek: Βουλή των Αντιπροσώπων Voulī́ tōn Antiprosṓpōn; Turkish: Temsilciler Meclisi) is the national unicameral legislature of the Republic of Cyprus. Members and three observers representing Armenian, Latin, and Maronite Cypriots are elected by proportional representation every five years. 30% of seats are allocated to Turkish Cypriots, but these have been vacant since 1964. The House of Representatives of Cyprus is the only legislature in the European Union within a fully presidential system.

== Seats by District ==
The current electoral law provides for a simple proportional representation system. The number of seats in each constituency is determined by law with constituencies coinciding with administrative districts. Seat allocation for the Greek Cypriot community are as follows:

Districts	Seats
Nicosia	19
Limassol	12
Famagusta	11
Larnaca	6
Paphos	5
Kyrenia	3
	Total: 56

== Composition ==
Party	Seats
Democratic Rally	17
Progressive Party of Working People	15
National People's Front	8
Democratic Party	8
ALMA – Citizens for Cyprus	4
Direct Democracy Cyprus	4
EDEK Socialist Party	0
Active Citizens – Movement of Cypriot United Hunters	0
Democratic Alignment	0
Volt Cyprus	0
Movement of Ecologists – Citizens' Cooperation	0
Democratic National Movement	0
Stand Up	0
Agronomist Agricultural Labour Party	0
Democratic Change	0
Green Party of Cyprus	0
Patriotic Front "Lacedaemonians"	0
Independents	0
Total	56
Source: Central Elections Service

== List ==
Member of Parliament	Constituency	Party	Parliamentary group
Dimitris Dimitriou	Nicosia	Democratic Rally	DISY
George Pamboridis	Nicosia	Democratic Rally	DISY
Savia Orfanidou	Nicosia	Democratic Rally	DISY
Andreas Constantinou	Nicosia	Democratic Rally	DISY
Charalambos Petrides	Nicosia	Democratic Rally	DISY
Stefanos Stefanou	Nicosia	Progressive Party of Working People	AKEL
Christos Christofidis	Nicosia	Progressive Party of Working People	AKEL
Aristos Damianou	Nicosia	Progressive Party of Working People	AKEL
George Loukaidis	Nicosia	Progressive Party of Working People	AKEL
Constantinos Constantinou	Nicosia	Progressive Party of Working People	AKEL
Christos Christou	Nicosia	National Popular Front	ELAM
Marios Pelekanos	Nicosia	National Popular Front	ELAM
Andreas Papacharalambous	Nicosia	National Popular Front	ELAM
Nicholas Papadopoulos	Nicosia	Democratic Party	DIKO
Christiana Erotokritou	Nicosia	Democratic Party	DIKO
Chrysis Pantelidis	Nicosia	Democratic Party	DIKO
Odysseas Michaelides	Nicosia	ALMA – Citizens for Cyprus	ALMA
Irene Charalambidou	Nicosia	ALMA – Citizens for Cyprus	ALMA
Yiannis Laouris	Nicosia	Direct Democracy Cyprus	ADK
Fotini Tsiridou	Limassol	Democratic Rally	DISY
George Karaiskakis	Limassol	Democratic Rally	DISY
Michalis Fellas	Limassol	Democratic Rally	DISY
Michalis Kounounis	Limassol	Democratic Rally	DISY
Efraim Christou	Limassol	Progressive Party of Working People	AKEL
Marina Nikolaou	Limassol	Progressive Party of Working People	AKEL
Argentoula Ioannou	Limassol	Progressive Party of Working People	AKEL
Polis Anogiriatis	Limassol	National Popular Front	ELAM
Eugenios Champoullas	Limassol	National Popular Front	ELAM
Panikos Leonidou	Limassol	Democratic Party	DIKO
Michalis Paraskevas	Limassol	ALMA – Citizens for Cyprus	ALMA
Dimitris Souglis	Limassol	Direct Democracy Cyprus	ADK
George Karoullas	Famagusta	Democratic Rally	DISY
Nikos Georgiou	Famagusta	Democratic Rally	DISY
George Lysandrides	Famagusta	Democratic Rally	DISY
Nikos Kettiros	Famagusta	Progressive Party of Working People	AKEL
George Koukoumas	Famagusta	Progressive Party of Working People	AKEL
Giannakis Gabriel	Famagusta	Progressive Party of Working People	AKEL
Linos Papagiannis	Famagusta	National Popular Front	ELAM
Linos Ioannis Chatzigeorgiou	Famagusta	National Popular Front	ELAM
Zacharias Koulias	Famagusta	Democratic Party	DIKO
Theodoulitsa Drousiotou	Famagusta	ALMA – Citizens for Cyprus	ALMA
Diana Constantinidi	Famagusta	Direct Democracy Cyprus	ADK
Annita Demetriou	Larnaca	Democratic Rally	DISY
Prodromos Alabritis	Larnaca	Democratic Rally	DISY
Andreas Pasiourtidis	Larnaca	Progressive Party of Working People	AKEL
Panikos Xiourouppas	Larnaca	Progressive Party of Working People	AKEL
Andreas Apostolou	Larnaca	Democratic Party	DIKO
Sotiris Ioannou	Larnaca	National Popular Front	ELAM
Charalambos Pazaros	Paphos	Democratic Rally	DISY
Nicoletta Constantinou	Paphos	Democratic Rally	DISY
Valentinos Fakontis	Paphos	Progressive Party of Working People	AKEL
Chrysanthos Savvidis	Paphos	Democratic Party	DIKO
Dimitris Baros	Paphos	Direct Democracy Cyprus	ADK
Dimos Georgiadis	Kyrenia	Democratic Rally	DISY
Anastasia Chasikou	Kyrenia	Progressive Party of Working People	AKEL
Adamos Aspris	Kyrenia	Democratic Party	DIKO

== See also ==
- Politics of Cyprus
