= List of members of the parliament of Cyprus, 2021–2026 =

This is a list of the current 56 members of the House of Representatives of Cyprus, following the 2021 Cypriot legislative election.

== List ==
Member of Parliament	Constituency	Party	Parliamentary group
Prodromos Alabritis	Larnaca	Democratic Rally	DISY
Andreas Apostolou	Larnaca	Movement for Social Democracy	Independent
Alexandra Attalides	Nicosia	Volt Cyprus (since 2023) Movement of Ecologists – Citizens' Cooperation (2021–2023)	KOSP
Giannakis Gabriel	Famagusta	Progressive Party of Working People	AKEL
Haris Georgiadis	Nicosia	Democratic Rally	DISY
Nikos Georgiou	Famagusta	Democratic Rally	DISY
Michalis Giakoumis	Famagusta	Democratic Alignment	Independent
Aristos Damianou	Nicosia	Progressive Party of Working People	AKEL
Annita Demetriou	Larnaca	Democratic Rally	DISY
Dimitris Dimitriou	Nicosia	Democratic Rally	DISY
Efthymios Diplaros	Limassol	Democratic Rally	DISY
Christiana Erotokritou	Nicosia	Democratic Party	DIKO
Konstantinos Efstathiou	Nicosia	Movement for Social Democracy	Independent
Andreas Themistocleous	Limassol	National Popular Front (later independent)	Independent
Rita Theodorou	Kyrenia	Democratic Rally	DISY
Charalambos Theopeptou	Nicosia	Movement of Ecologists – Citizens' Cooperation	KOSP
Sotiris Ioannou	Larnaca	National Popular Front	ELAM
Marios Garoyian	Limassol	Democratic Alignment	DIPA
George Karoullas	Famagusta	Democratic Rally	DISY
Andreas Kavkalias	Limassol	Progressive Party of Working People	AKEL
Nikos Kettiros	Famagusta	Progressive Party of Working People	AKEL
George Koukoumas	Famagusta	Progressive Party of Working People	AKEL
Zacharias Koulias	Famagusta	Democratic Party	DIKO
Onofrios Koullas	Famagusta	Democratic Rally	DISY
Andros Kyprianou	Nicosia	Progressive Party of Working People	AKEL
Kostas Kostas	Limassol	Progressive Party of Working People	AKEL
Panikos Leonidou	Limassol	Democratic Party	DIKO
George Loukaidis	Nicosia	Progressive Party of Working People	AKEL
Marios Mavridis	Kyrenia	Democratic Rally	DISY
Marinos Mousouttas (until December 2025) Giorgos Penintaex (from December 2025)	Nicosia	Democratic Alignment	DIPA
Pavlos Mylonas	Limassol	Democratic Party	DIKO
Ilias Myrianthous	Paphos	Movement for Social Democracy	EDEK
Averof Neofytou	Nicosia	Democratic Rally	DISY
Marina Nikolaou	Limassol	Progressive Party of Working People	AKEL
Christos Orphanidis	Larnaca	Democratic Party	DIKO
Savia Orfanidou	Nicosia	Democratic Rally	DISY
Charalambos Pazaros	Paphos	Democratic Rally	DISY
Chrysis Pantelidis	Nicosia	Democratic Party	DIKO
Linos Papagiannis	Famagusta	National Popular Front	ELAM
Nicholas Papadopoulos	Nicosia	Democratic Party	DIKO
Stavros Papadouris	Limassol	Movement of Ecologists – Citizens' Cooperation	KOSP
Andreas Pasiourtidis	Larnaca	Progressive Party of Working People	AKEL
Chrysanthos Savvidis	Paphos	Democratic Party	DIKO
Christos Senekis	Famagusta	Democratic Party	DIKO
Marinos Sizopoulos	Limassol	Movement for Social Democracy	EDEK
Stefanos Stefanou	Nicosia	Progressive Party of Working People	AKEL
Nikos Sykas	Limassol	Democratic Rally	DISY
Nicos Tornaritis	Nicosia	Democratic Rally	DISY
Alekos Tryfonidis	Nicosia	Democratic Alignment	DIPA
Fotini Tsiridou	Limassol	Democratic Rally	DISY
Valentinos Fakontis	Paphos	Progressive Party of Working People	AKEL
Irini Charalambidou	Nicosia	Progressive Party of Working People	AKEL
Kyriakos Hatzigiannis	Famagusta	Democratic Rally	DISY
Christos Christou	Nicosia	National Popular Front	ELAM
Christos Christofias	Kyrenia	Progressive Party of Working People	AKEL
Christos Christofidis	Nicosia	Progressive Party of Working People	AKEL

== See also ==
- Politics of Cyprus
