= 2028 Cypriot presidential election =

- February 2028 (presumptive)
Incumbent President
Nikos Christodoulides
Independent

Presidential elections will be held in Cyprus in 2028. Should no candidate receive a majority of the vote in the first round, a runoff will be held. The elections may be held earlier under exceptional circumstances, such as the resignation or death of the incumbent president Nikos Christoudoulides. Christodoulides, being in office since 2023, is eligible to run for a second term.

== Potential candidates ==
=== ALMA – Citizens for Cyprus ===
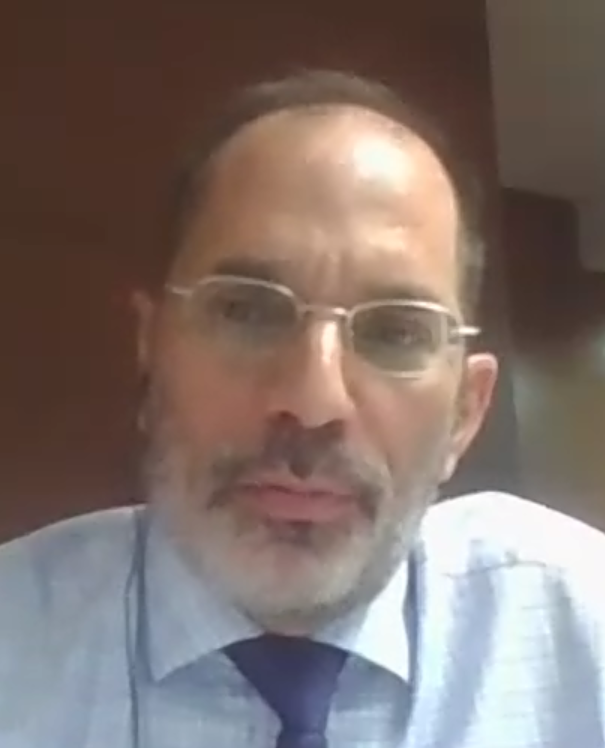
Odysseas Michaelides

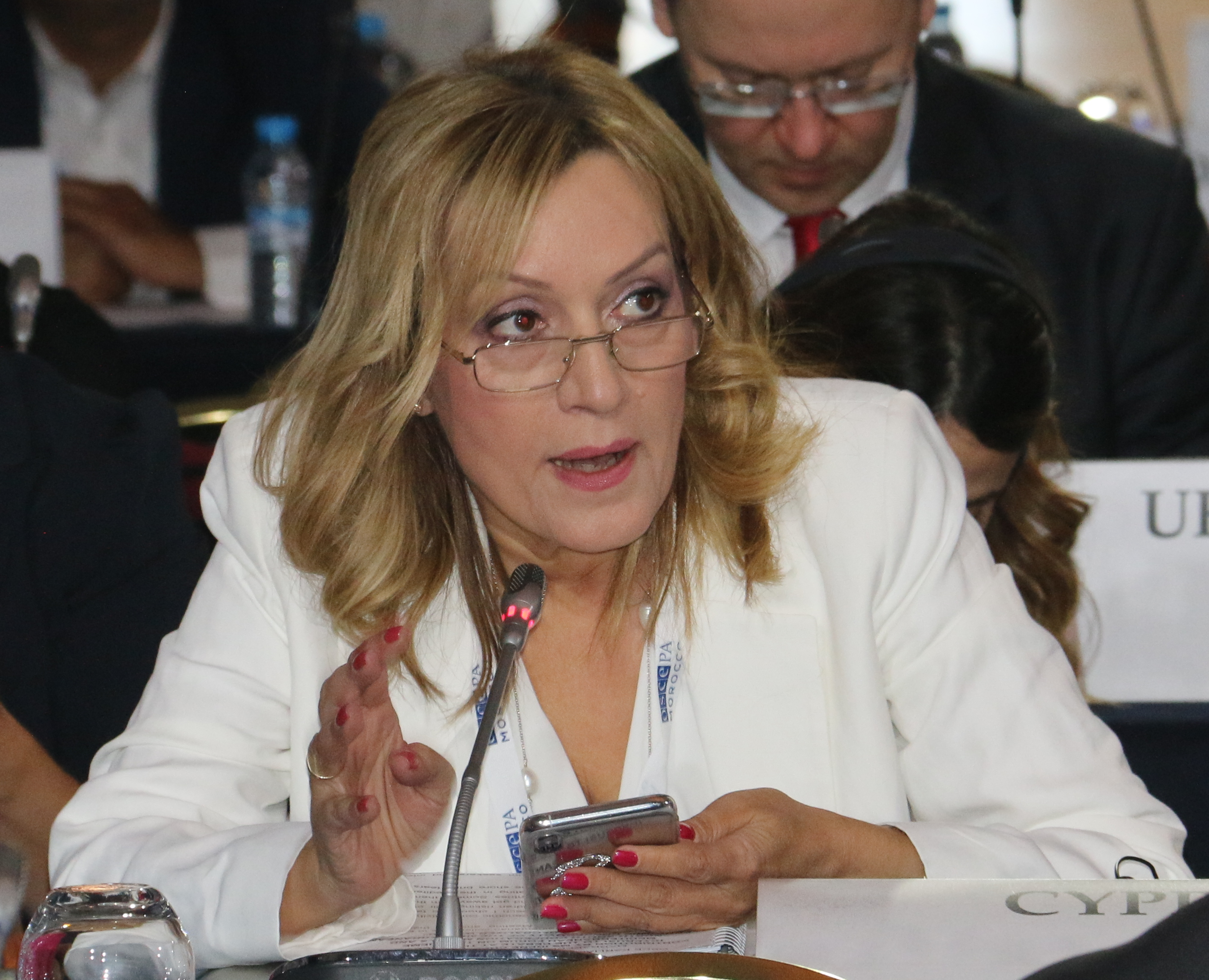
Irene Charalambidou
- MP Odysseas Michaelides,, President of ALMA, former auditor general of Cyprus, controversially dismissed from his position due to inappropriate conduct.
- MP Irene Charalambidou, vice-president of the Parliamentary Assembly of the Organization for Security and Co-operation in Europe.

=== Democratic Party (DIKO) ===
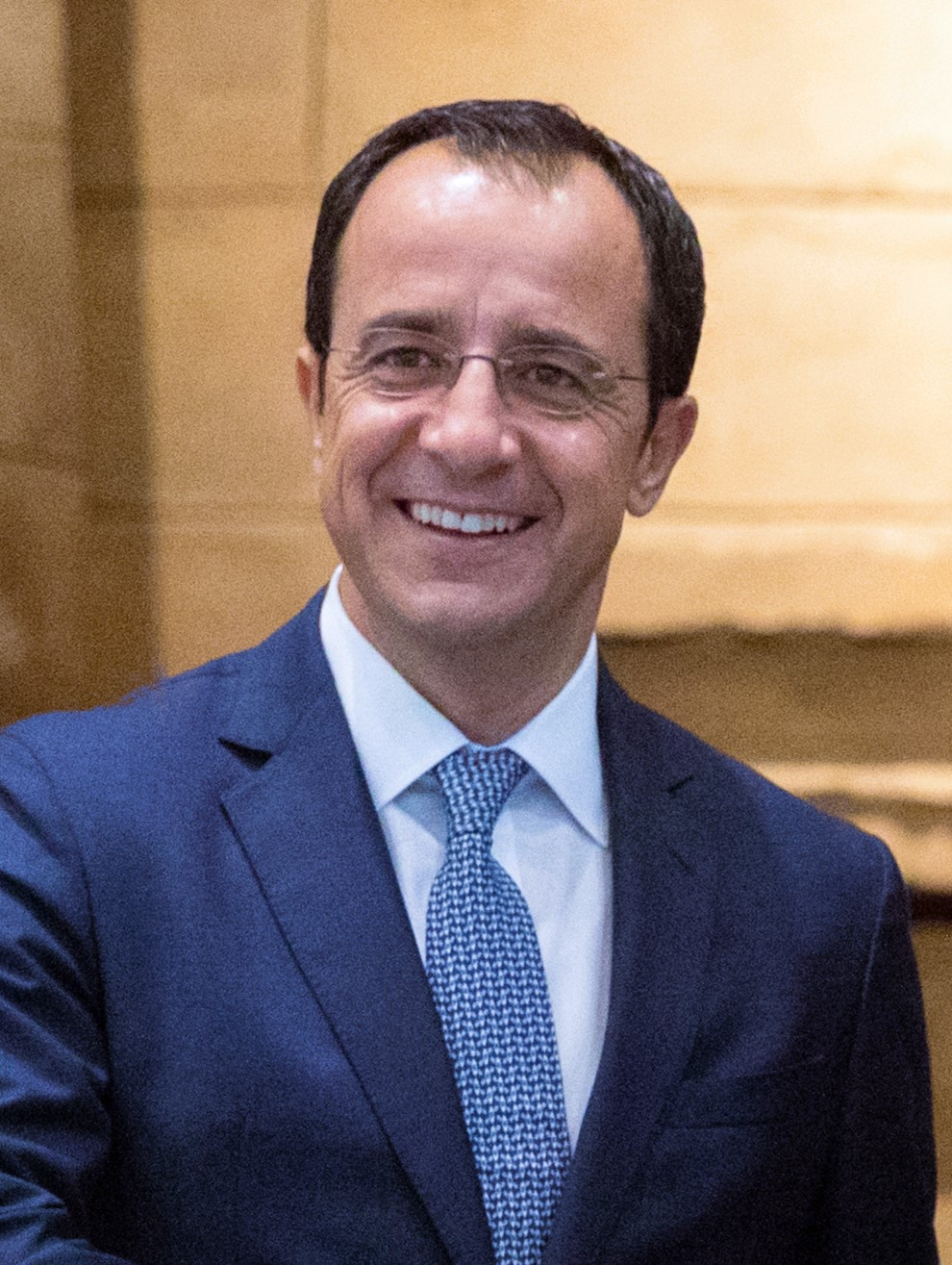
Nikos Christodoulides (Independent)

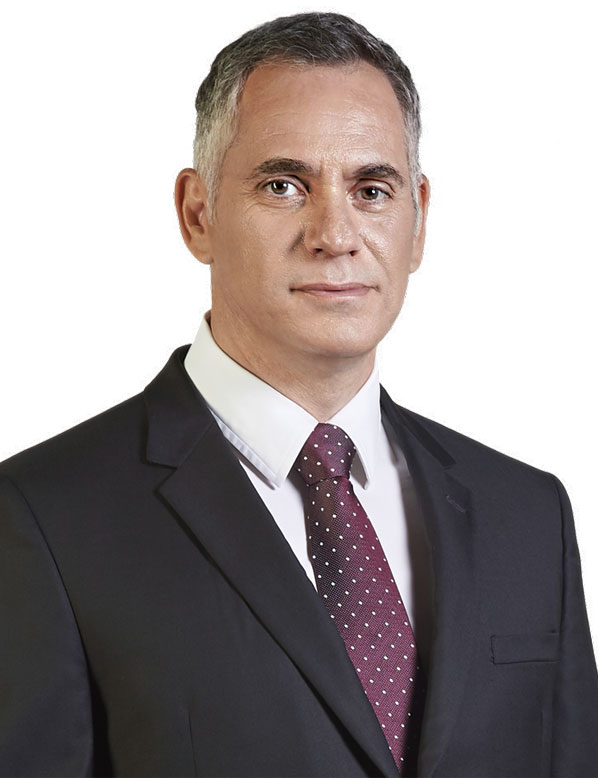
Nikolas Papadopoulos
- Nikos Christodoulides (Independent, supported by DIKO), incumbent President of Cyprus, former Minister of Foreign Affairs (2018–2022), former Government Spokesman (2013–2018) and former member of DISY.
- MP Nikolas Papadopoulos, President of DIKO since 2013 and DIKO's candidate in the 2018 presidential election.

=== Democratic Rally ===
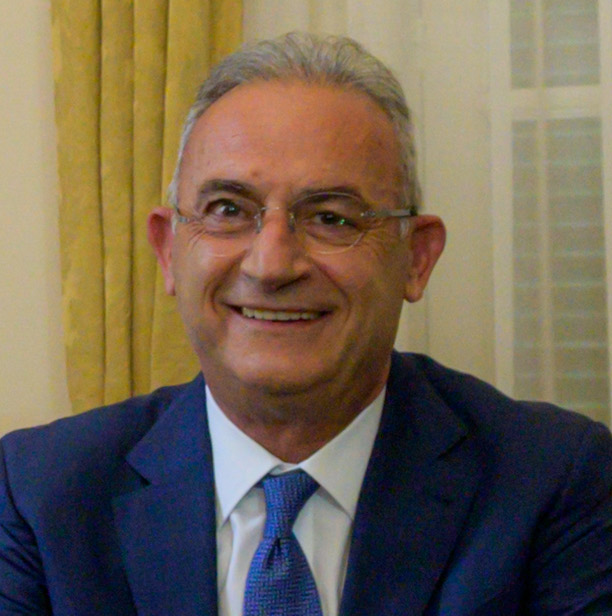
Averof Neofytou

George Pamboridis
- MP Averof Neofytou, former President of DISY (2013–2023) and DISY's nominee for the 2023 presidential election.
- MP George Pamboridis, former Minister of Health (2015-2018).

Withdrawn:

- MP Annita Demetriou, President of DISY (2023–present) and President of the House of Representatives

The Democratic Rally has announced that its presidential nominee will be elected by its 50,000 members.

=== Progressive Party of Working People (AKEL) ===
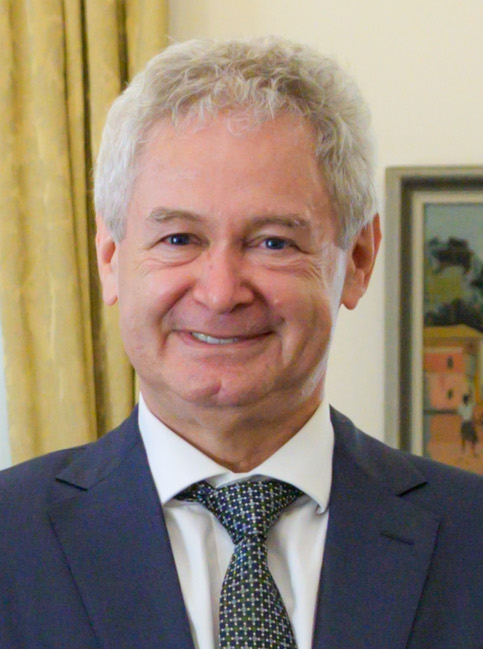
Andreas Mavroyiannis (Independent)
- Andreas Mavroyiannis (Independent, supported by AKEL), former negotiator of the Greek Cypriot community in the Cyprus talks, former Permanent Representative of Cyprus to the UN, former Permanent Representative of Cyprus to the EU and Deputy Minister for European Affairs (2012). Mavroyiannis was an independent candidate for the 2023 presidential election, supported by AKEL.

=== National People's Front ===
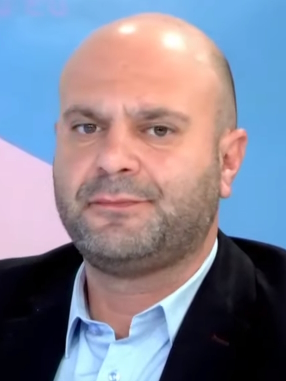
Christos Christou
- Christos Christou, president of ELAM and ELAM's candidate for the 2018 and 2023 presidential election.

== Declined to be candidates ==
- Efthimios Diplaros, Deputy President of the Democratic Rally.
