= Michalis Paraskevas =

Cypriot lawyer, activist and politician (born 1976)

- Μιχάλης Παρασκευάς
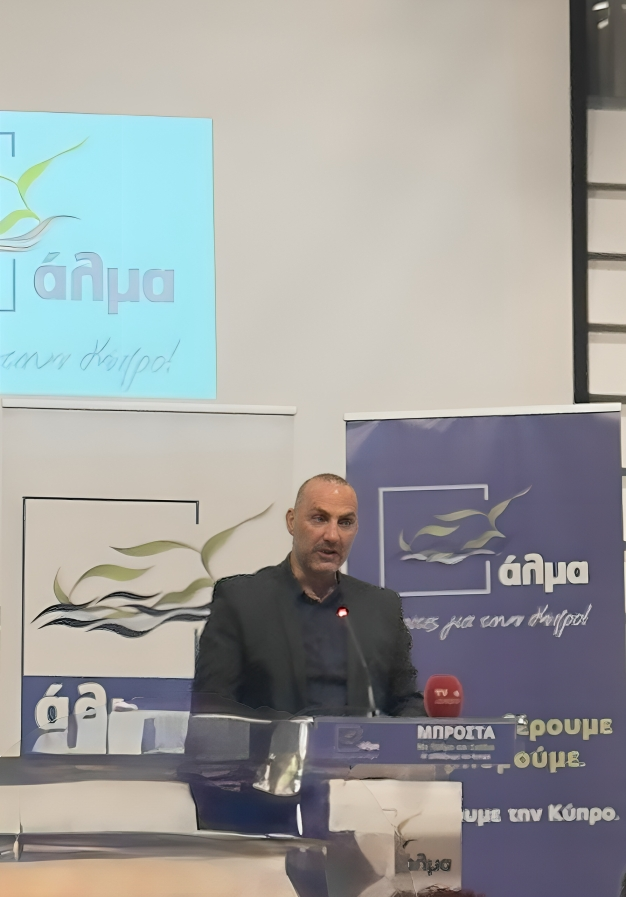
- Paraskevas in 2026

Member of the Cypriot House of Representatives
- Incumbent
- Assumed office 25 May 2026
- Constituency: Limassol

Personal details
- Born: 17 November 1976 (age 49) Nicosia, Cyprus
- Party: ALMA

Michalis Paraskevas (Greek: Μιχάλης Παρασκευάς; born 17 November 1976) is a Cypriot lawyer and politician, who serves as a member of the House of Representatives in Cyprus since May 2026. He has been described as an activist and as a politician. His activism work primarily concerned the rights and well-being of refugees, and opposition to the austerity policies of the Cypriot government.

== Early life and education ==
Michalis Paraskevas was born and raised in Nicosia to a Greek-Cypriot family. He has been influenced by his family and his social environment and he was raised to be proud of his Greek heritage and the national struggles, but he never was a nationalist or right-wing. He studied law at Aristotle University of Thessaloniki in Greece.

== Activism ==
In Cyprus, the treatment of asylum seekers has long drawn sharp international criticism, with reports highlighting systemic failures in processing claims, inadequate detention conditions, and procedural irregularities that undermine due process. His high-profile stance, which included public appeals for reform and legal battles that reached the appeals court, drew attention to interconnected issues such as prolonged detentions at facilities like Menoyia, questionable deportations, and cases involving vulnerable asylum seekers, including pregnant women facing bureaucratic obstacles. Through his activism and media engagements, Paraskevas positioned his refusal to contribute to the SIF as both personal principle and a broader challenge to institutional failures in protecting human rights within the Republic of Cyprus.

In 2014, he refused to pay social insurance contributions as an act of civil disobedience in response to the government's decision of writing-off a 7.2 billion euro debt to the Social Insurance Fund, as suggested by the Troika in 2012. A refusal to comply with the court order to pay the fine could result in a jail sentence and probably disbarment. Michalis Paraskevas' civil disobedience was also connected to the refusal of the Minister of Finance to comply with the Social Insurance Fund 2010 Law, which obliged the Minister to repay some of the debt back to the Social Insurance account so as to create real assets, and to appoint an independent committee for auditing purposes. The initiative concerning the Social Insurance Fund resulted in the creation of a small team of activists called "Initiative for Social Control of Social Insurance Fund". It demanded the return of money from the state to the Social Insurance Fund, and reformation of the way the Fund is controlled so as to allow for some direct control by the citizens. As he explained in interviews following the 2018 Presidential Election, when the same people were candidates, as if nothing happened, he realized that the impact of this endearing effort simply had no practical effect on society and that the civil disobedience as way of social struggle or awaking in Cyprus society was at least insufficient. ΕΥΡΩΕΚΛΟΓΕΣ 2019-ΜΙΧΑΛΗΣ ΠΑΡΑΣΚΕΥΑΣ Active Radio Cyprus on Facebook Watch

== Ideas, influences, and political stances ==
Michalis Paraskevas has consistently defended human rights and social equality.

He identified himself as an anarchist who supports direct democracy, and named Peter Kropotkin, Mikhail Bekunin, Errico Malatesta and Alexander Berkman as his influences. At some point, he vehemently opposed voting and all contact with political parties, and argued that anyone running for office does it for personal gain, and also argued against the hypocrisy of tie-wearing politicians.

He later switched position and lobbied parliamentary parties in order to influence the legislative process.

A quote from one of his interviews:

"Δημοκρατία είναι να είσαι σε θέση να αλλάζεις τις αποφάσεις σου, αν κρίνεις ότι αυτό είναι αναγκαίο για το κοινό καλό. Όλα κρίνονται σε πολιτικό επίπεδο και όχι με λόγια του αέρα ή με ατάκες στο facebook. Στην αρχή της δημιουργίας της Πρωτοβουλίας, πράγματι είπαμε όχι επαφές με κόμματα… αλλά συνειδητοποιήσαμε στην πορεία, ότι τον νόμο για το ΤΚΑ θα τον ψηφίσουν τα κόμματα φυσικά…και τότε τους πρότεινα ο ίδιος, να κάνουμε συμμαχίες με τα κόμματα. Κάναμε λοιπόν συναντήσεις με όλα τα κόμματα, εκτός από το ΕΛΑΜ, γιατί η Πρωτοβουλία δεν διαχωρίζει τους ανθρώπους με βάση την εθνικότητα, το φύλο, τον σεξουαλικό προσδιορισμό ή άλλα χαρακτηριστικά τους…Πρέπει να πω ότι η Πρωτοβουλία ήταν ένα τεράστιο σχολείο για μένα και το πρώτο μάθημα που έμαθα είναι ότι ο μέσος Κύπριος απλώς λέει μεγάλα λόγια και δεν ενδιαφέρεται πραγματικά να κάνει κάτι ουσιαστικό και πρακτικό, για να αλλάξει προς το καλύτερο τη ζωή του. Δεν έχουμε κουλτούρα αυτο-οργάνωσης και μάθαμε να αποφασίζουν άλλοι, για μας. Δεν υπάρχει το ιδεατό και το ιδανικό, οπότε κάποιος, είτε θα κάνει ό,τι καλύτερο, για να αλλάξει μια κατάσταση που δεν του αρέσει, είτε θα συνεχίσει να λέει μεγάλα λόγια στο facebook και να νομίζει ότι είναι μεγάλος επαναστάτης του πληκτρολογίου… Ουσιαστικά παρέμεινα μόνος, σε ό,τι αφορά την πολιτική ανυπακοή, αφού κανένας δεν ήταν πρόθυμος να κάνει επίσης πολιτική ανυπακοή ώστε να έχει κόστος η άλλη πλευρά και να αναγκαστεί να διαπραγματευτεί μαζί μας."

— Michalis Paraskevas

In December 2018, he announced his candidacy for the European Parliament Elections of May 2019 and started wearing a tie on TV. He also claimed that his political views and aspirations partly overlap with two parties, the Cyprus Green Party and the Citizens' Alliance.

On 14 January 2019 he announced that he would be running for office as an independent candidate. In justifying his decision, he stated that society wants others to decide. He also stated that his personal long-term goal is to participate in decisions.

He has a distinctive style and mannerisms, characterised by "fiery posturing", furious and energetic "as if about to explode".

On the 18th of October 2025, Paraskevas announced he will be running for the 2026 Cypriot legislative election as part of the new political movement called ALMA, which was created by Odysseas Michaelides. On the 22nd of March, ALMA announced that Paraskevas will be running as a candidate for the Limassol district.

On the 24th of May 2026, Michalis was elected as a member of the House of Representatives, being one of the four ALMA elected members.
