= Savia Orphanidou =

Cypriot politician (born 1979)

- Σάβια Ορφανίδου

House of Representatives of Cyprus
- Incumbent
- Assumed office December 2019

Personal details
- Born: 18 August 1979 (age 47) Nicosia, Cyprus
- Party: Democratic Rally
- Education: University of Warwick (BSc, MA)
- Occupation: Politician, economist

Savia Orphanidou (Greek: Σάβια Ορφανίδου; born 18 August 1979) is a Cypriot economist and politician. She has served in the House of Representatives since December 2019, representing the Nicosia constituency as a member of the Democratic Rally (DISY).

== Early life and career ==
Orphanidou was raised in Nicosia, Cyprus, and attended The English School. She obtained a BSc in economics and politics and an MA in international political economy from the University of Warwick.

In 2025, Orphanidou was included in a list of the "most powerful women" in Cyprus compiled by the Employers and Industrialists Federation (OEB) and the Gender Equality Commissioner.

== Political career ==
=== Youth politics ===
Orphanidou became involved in youth politics in the early 2000s. From 2003 to 2005, she was a member of the Nicosia District Committee of NEDISY, the youth wing of the Democratic Rally (DISY), and Nicosia District Secretary for MAKI, the student wing of DISY. From 2005 to 2007, she served as the public relations secretary of the NEDISY political bureau. In 2009, she became the press and communications secretary of the Organisation of Young Scientists of DISY, remaining in the role until 2011.

=== National politics ===
From 2009 to 2011, Orphanidou worked as a coordinator of the communications, media, and public relations sector of the DISY communications directorate. In November 2010, she was named Deputy Secretary of the party's political planning, remaining in the role until February 2012.

In February 2012, she was elected as a member of the party's political bureau, a role she held until May 2018. From 2015 to 2016, she was also a member of the Technical Committee for Economic Affairs, an advisory body for the negotiation process related to the Cyprus problem.

In May 2023, Orphanidou was elected vice president of the Democratic Rally.

=== House of Representatives ===
Orphanidou became a member of the House of Representatives in December 2019, representing the Nicosia constituency as a member of DISY, and she was re-elected in the legislative election in May 2021.

As of March 2026, she serves as vice chair of the House Standing Committee on Health, and as a member of the committees on finance, the environment, and public expenditure. She is also a member of the delegation to the Interparliamentary Conference on Stability, Economic Coordination, and Governance in the European Union. She previously served as deputy chairperson of the House Standing Committee on Energy, Trade, Industry and Tourism.

Orphanidou was one of two incumbent DISY members of parliament in Nicosia who indicated that they would seek re-election in the 2026 legislative election.

==== Accessibility law ====
In March 2023, Orphanidou tabled a bill along with DIKO MP Christiana Erotokritou that would provide accommodations to vulnerable groups such as seniors and people with disabilities, granting them priority access to public services. Parliament passed the bill unanimously.

==== Animal rights ====
In March 2025, she tabled a bill to strengthen protections against animal abuse by amending the Law on the Protection and Welfare of Animals, stating that "a nation's values are evident in how it treats its animals."

==== Maternity protections ====
In May 2025, she proposed an amendment to the Protection of Maternity Law that would provide an additional three months of flexible working hours to new mothers. The bill was passed unanimously by parliament, with support from several trade unions, despite opposition from the Cyprus Chamber of Commerce.

== Personal life ==
In July 2020, Orphanidou gave birth to her first child, a daughter.
