= Democratic National Movement =

Cypriot political party

Democratic National Movement Δημοκρατικό Εθνικό Κίνημα
- Abbreviation: ΔΕΚ
- President: Andreas Themistokleous
- Vice Presidents: Nicos Charalambous, Prokopis Prokopiou, Marios Mavrikios
- Founder: Andreas Themistokleous
- Founded: 15 January 2025
- Split from: National Popular Front
- Ideology: Greek nationalism Ultraconservatism
- Political position: Far-right
- Colors: Dark blue and white
- House of Representatives: 0 / 56
- European Parliament: 0 / 6

Website
- dekcyprus.com

The Democratic National Movement (Greek: Δημοκρατικό Εθνικό Κίνημα, romanized: Dimokratiko Ethniko Kinima) is a far-right Cypriot political party, led by the independent MP of Limassol constituency, Andreas Themistokleous.

The party was founded in January 2025 by Themistokleous following his expulsion from the far-right National Popular Front (ELAM) and ideological disagreements during his earlier involvement with the centre-right Democratic Rally (DISY). It was formed in response to internal conflicts and disputes over political direction in both parties.

The Democratic National Movement focuses on the preservation of Greek national identity in Cyprus, strong opposition to progressive social reforms and "Woke culture", and the revitalization of rural and economically disadvantaged communities. It strongly opposes a bi-zonal, bi-communal federation as a solution to the Cyprus problem, viewing it as a threat to the Hellenic identity and territorial integrity of the Republic of Cyprus.

== Ideology and positions ==
The Democratic National Movement (DEK) promotes national identity, Hellenic heritage, and Orthodox Christian values. It asserts that Cyprus is an inseparable part of the Greek nation and cultural sphere. Its founder, Andreas Themistokleous, has described the party as opposing what he refers to as "Woke culture" and everything it entails.

DEK rejects any stance on Cypriot sovereignty based on a bi-zonal, bi-communal federation, which it views as a threat to national unity and democratic integrity. Instead, it promotes the full rejection of Turkish occupation and the safeguarding of the Greek character of the island.

Its foundational principles include:

- Absolute commitment to the survival of Hellenism in Cyprus.
- Rejection of any recognition or normalization of the pseudo-state in occupied Cyprus.
- Defense of Greek as the national language in all domains of public and cultural life.
- Promotion of armed defense capabilities, the revival of the Greece–Cyprus Unified Defense Doctrine, and the pursuit of strategic alliances.
- Opposition to mass illegal immigration, globalism, the woke ideology, and efforts to deconstruct the traditional values of the Greek nation.
- Support for national education, the public health system, rural development, and the protection of small and medium enterprises.
- Emphasis on economic sovereignty, a regulated private sector, and the rejection of oligopolistic practices.
- Commitment to European integration only under the condition of safeguarding national sovereignty and Christian values.

== Party leaders ==
No.	Leader	Term of office	Notes
1	Andreas Themistokleous	2025 – present	Provisional president since the party's foundation

== Election results ==
=== Parliament ===
House of Representatives
Election	Votes			Seats	
Election	#	%	Rank	#	±
2026	2,628	0.71	12th	0 / 56	new
