= George Pamboridis =

Cypriot lawyer and politician

- Γιώργος Παμπορίδης
- Pamboridis in 2017

Member of the House of Representatives
- Incumbent
- Assumed office June 2026
- Constituency: Nicosia

Minister of Health
- In office 27 July 2015 – 28 February 2018
- President: Nicos Anastasiades
- Preceded by: Philippos Patsalis
- Succeeded by: Constantinos Ioannou

Personal details
- Born: Nicosia, Cyprus
- Party: Democratic Rally
- Occupation: Lawyer

George Pamboridis (Greek: Γιώργος Παμπορίδης) is a Cypriot lawyer and politician. A member of the Democratic Rally, he has represented Nicosia in the House of Representatives since June 2026. He served as Minister of Health under President Nicos Anastasiades from July 2015 to February 2018.

== Education and legal career ==
Pamboridis was born in Nicosia. He studied law at the National and Kapodistrian University of Athens. He holds an LL.M. in shipping law and a Ph.D. in public international and shipping law from the University of Southampton, and an M.Sc. in international relations from the London School of Economics.

He worked at Holman Fenwick Willan in London and later practised as a partner at L. Papaphilippou & Co in Nicosia. In 2003, he established Pamboridis LLC, with offices in Nicosia and Athens. He has also taught international shipping law and energy law at the University of Cyprus.

== Political career ==
=== Minister of Health ===
Pamboridis served as Minister of Health from 27 July 2015 to 28 February 2018, succeeding Philippos Patsalis and preceding Constantinos Ioannou.

As health minister, Pamboridis negotiated with political parties and health-sector organisations on legislation for the General Health System (GeSY). On 16 June 2017, the House of Representatives unanimously approved legislation and regulations concerning GeSY and the autonomy of public hospitals.

=== House of Representatives ===
Pamboridis was elected to parliament in the May 2026 election. He took office in June as a Democratic Rally representative for Nicosia.

=== Presidential nomination bid ===
On 5 October 2026, Pamboridis announced that he would seek the Democratic Rally nomination for the 2028 Cypriot presidential election.

== Other roles ==
In February 2019, The Cyprus Institute announced that Pamboridis had accepted an invitation to join the board of trustees of the Cyprus Research and Educational Foundation, the institute's governing body.

== Publications ==
- International Shipping Law: Legislation and Enforcement (Kluwer Law International, 1999).
- Hydrocarbons of the Republic of Cyprus (2012).
