= Marina Nikolaou =

Cypriot politician (born 1986)

- Μαρίνα Νικολάου
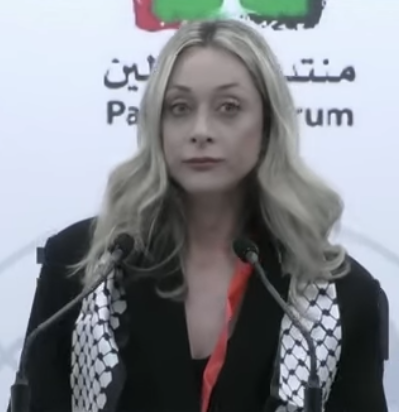
- Speaking in 2025

Member of the House of Representatives of Cyprus
- Incumbent
- Assumed office June 2021
- Constituency: Limassol District

Personal details
- Born: 27 November 1986 (age 39) Limassol, Cyprus
- Party: AKEL
- Education: University of Cyprus, Frederick University
- Occupation: Politician

Marina Nikolaou (Greek: Μαρίνα Νικολάου; born 27 November 1986) is a Cypriot politician. She was elected to the House of Representatives in the 2021 legislative election, representing the Limassol constituency as a member of the Progressive Party of Working People (AKEL).

== Early life and career ==
Nikolaou was born in Limassol, Cyprus, and raised in Pelendri. She studied political science at the University of Cyprus and underwent postgraduate studies in communications, media, & journalism at Frederick University.

She became involved in politics from a young age as a member of PEOM, a leftist student organization; EDON, the youth wing of AKEL; and the Progressive Movement of Students. She has been a member of AKEL since 2004, and is a member of the party's Central Committee. She has represented EDON and AKEL at various international conferences.

Nikolaou worked in the press office and cultural affairs bureau of EDON and as a research fellow at the Cyprus Labour Institute (INEK-PEO), and later at the youth centre of the Cyprus Youth Organization (ONEK). She has also been a member of the general council of the POGO Women's Movement.

== Political career ==
=== European Parliament (2016–2021) ===
In 2016, Nikolaou began working as a political advisor for the European United Left/Nordic Green Left in the European Parliament. Her work focused on engaging with the Committee on Culture and Education and the Committee on Regional Development, as well as the European Parliament delegation to Palestine and the delegation to the Parliamentary Assembly for the Mediterranean.

In May 2019, she ran for election to the European Parliament as a member of AKEL.

=== House of Representatives of Cyprus (2021–present) ===
Nikolaou was elected to the House of Representatives in the June 2021 legislative election, becoming one of three AKEL MPs representing the Limassol constituency, and one of eight women in parliament.

During her tenure, she has served as deputy chair of the House Standing Committee on Internal Affairs and as a member of the Committee on Foreign and European Affairs, the Committee on Health Affairs, and the Committee on the Environment. She is also a member of the Cypriot delegation to the Conference of Parliamentary Committees for Union Affairs of Parliaments to the European Union (COSAC). In December 2025, AKEL announced that she would seek re-election in the May 2026 legislative election, making her the only AKEL MP in Limassol to do so.

In October 2025, Nikolaou signed a joint statement with more than eighty other European parliamentarians condemning Israel's interception of the Global Sumud Flotilla and the detention of the convoy's volunteers. In March 2026, following drone strikes on RAF Akrotiri, she accused President Nikos Christodoulides of "leading a spineless foreign policy."
