= Irene Charalambidou =

Cypriot journalist and politician

- Ειρήνη Χαραλαμπίδου
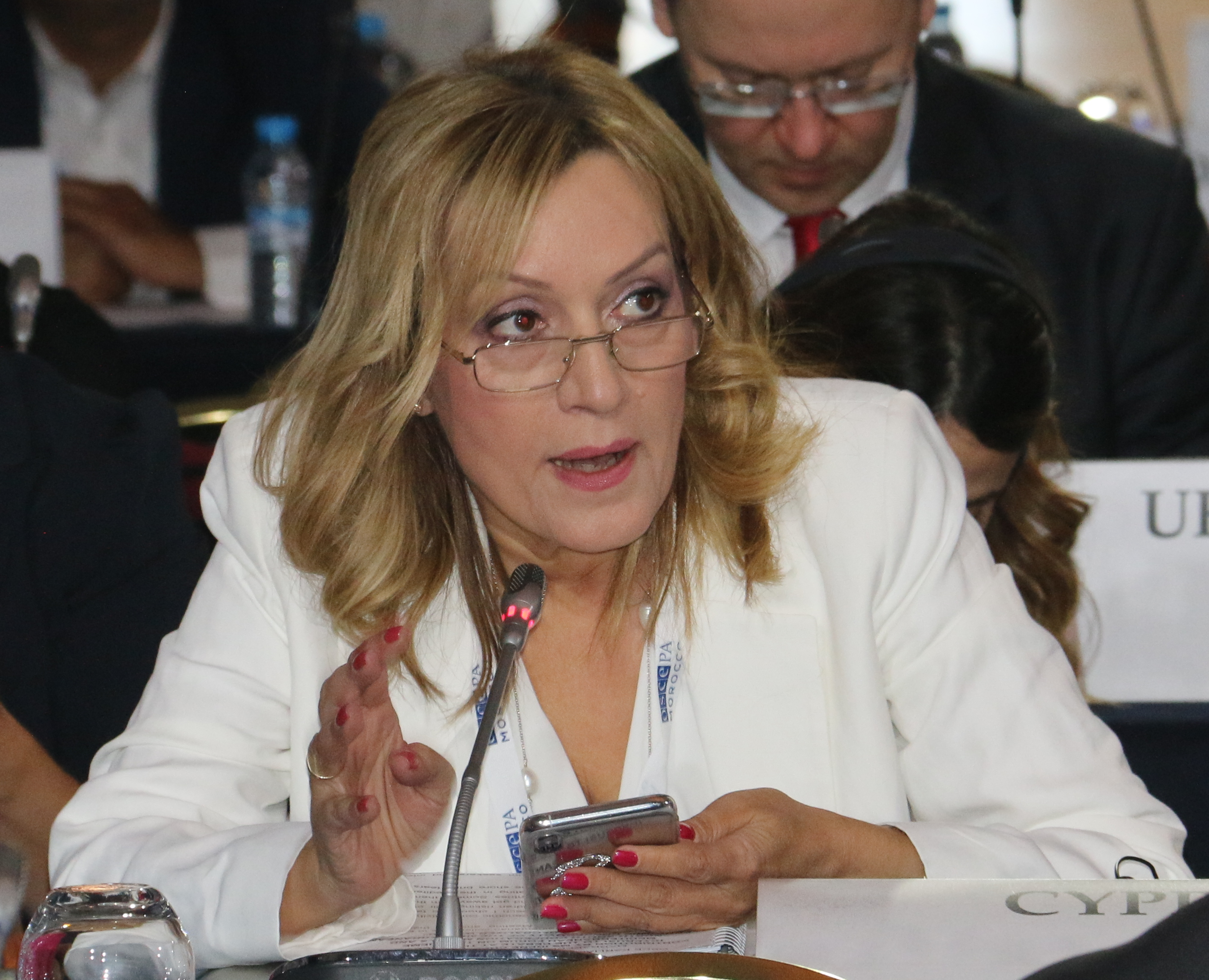

Member of the House of Representatives
- Incumbent
- Assumed office 2011

Personal details
- Born: 19 March 1964 (age 62) Lemesos, Cyprus
- Party: ALMA (since 2026); AKEL (until 2026)
- Education: University of Nicosia; Mediterranean College of Athens

Irene Charalambidou (Greek: Ειρήνη Χαραλαμπίδου; born 19 March 1964) is a Cypriot journalist and politician. In 2011, she was elected MP in the Nicosia constituency with AKEL, being re-elected in 2016, and again in 2021. She joined ALMA ahead of the 2026 election.

== Early life and education ==
Irene Charalambidou was born in Limassol on 19 March 1964.

She studied psychology at the University of Nicosia and journalism at the Mediterranean College in Athens.

== Career ==
=== Journalism ===
She worked as a journalist at the newspaper "The Games", in "Eleftherotypia" and collaborated with the newspaper "Kiryka". She was the director of public relations of the "Louis" Tourism Organization. She has worked for many years on Cyprus Broadcasting Corporation, presenting one of the most popular shows of the time, "Pleasant Saturday Night". She also worked for the television of "Logos" and "ANT1 Cyprus". During the period 2005-2011 she was responsible for the research, journalistic supervision and presentation of the TV broadcasting policy of RIK "We Discuss It". The President of the Republic of Cyprus, Demetris Christofias, made the first presidential report on this show in December 2008.

=== Author ===
In 2007, she published her first book titled What We Talked and in January 2011, the second book, The White Pages of the Cyprus issue on the political analysis of events of the contemporary political history of Cyprus. The presentation of the book was made by the President of the Republic of Cyprus, Dimitris Christofias.

=== Politics ===
In 2011, Charalambidou was elected a member of the electoral district of Nicosia with AKEL. She is a member of the Parliamentary Committee on Institutions, Securities and Administration, the House Standing Committee on the Development and Control of Public Expenditure and the Parliamentary Committee on Health. On May 22, 2016, she is re-elected to Nicosia with AKEL. She is ranked first in crosses of preference and this makes her the first female Member who succeeds in national elections to be elected with most crosses of preference pancyprian. With the new legislature, she is Deputy Chairwoman of the House Standing Committee on the Development and Control of Public Expenditure, and a member of the Institutions, Securities and Administration, Health and Human Rights Committees.

== Personal life ==
She is married to Andros Papapavlou and has two sons.
