= Direct Democracy Cyprus =

Political party in Cyprus

Direct Democracy Cyprus Άμεση Δημοκρατία Κύπρου Ámesi Dimokratía Kýprou
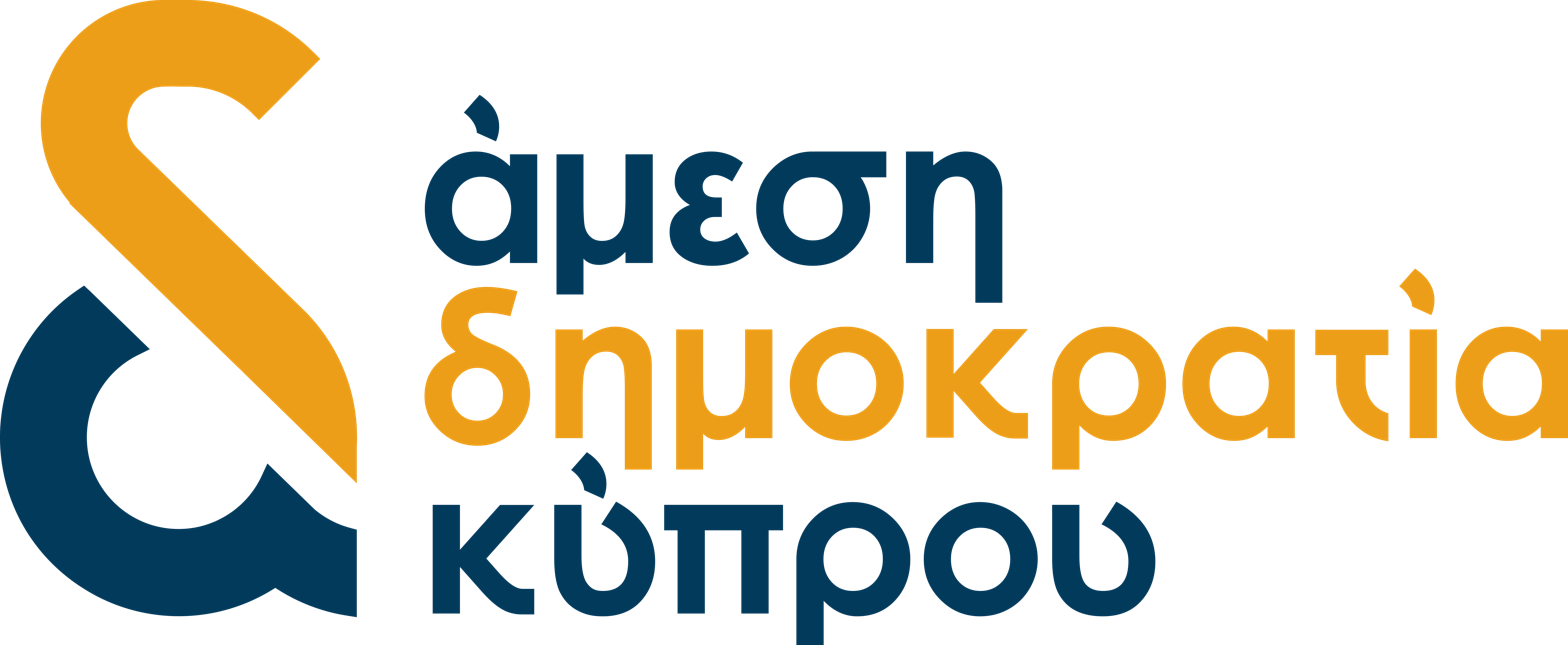
- President: Fidias Panayiotou
- Founder: Fidias Panayiotou
- Founded: 16 October 2025; 12 months ago
- Legalised: 27 February 2026; 7 months ago
- European Parliament group: Non-Inscrits
- Colours: Dark blue Orange
- House of Representatives: 4 / 56
- European Parliament: 1 / 6
- Municipal Councils: 0 / 443

Website
- register.directdemocra.cy

Direct Democracy Cyprus (Greek: Άμεση Δημοκρατία Κύπρου, romanized: Ámesi Dimokratía Kýprou) is a political party in Cyprus established by YouTuber and MEP Fidias Panayiotou.

Initially declared "Direct Democracy" on 16 October 2025, the party was legally founded on 27 February 2026, under the name "Direct Democracy Cyprus".

== The "Agorà" application ==
The "Agorà" App (meaning "marketplace" and "place of public discussion" in Greek) is the application used by the party supporters to vote on parliamentary issues.

The party operates an online application through which Cypriot citizens can verify their identity and indicate how they want their representatives to vote. According to the party, elected representatives would use these results to guide their votes in parliament, with the long-term aim of replacing the representative parliamentary system with direct democracy.

This is not the first attempt to establish direct democracy into a parliament via a similar "Trojan Horse" system, with the first one being IserveU. This idea was also tried, under the name pirategov, in the Pirate Party of Greece from 19 June 2012 until 16 December 2012.. There is also the Russian Party of Direct Democracy that was founded in 2020 and several other attempts in the List of direct democracy parties.

Between 12 and 14 March 2026, over 16,000 verified Cypriot citizens voted in the app to determine the party's 56 candidates for the 2026 Cypriot parliamentary elections. Between 19 and 21 March 2026, elections were held to determine the party's president, with Fidias Panayiotou receiving 56.79% of the vote. Diana Constantinides, who received 27.26%, was appointed vice-president. At the elections, ADK elected 4 MPs and received over 20,000 votes.

== Cyprus Parliamentary Elections 2026 ==
The "Direct Republic of Cyprus" won four seats in the parliamentary elections of Cyprus in 2026. Initially, the following were elected:

- Fidias Panayiotou (Nicosia)
- Diana Lucia Konstantinidis (Ammochostos)
- Dimitris Souglis (Limesos)
- Dimitris Baros (Paphos)

Fidias Panayiotou chose to keep his seat in the European Parliament and renounced the parliamentary seat of Nicosia, which goes to Yiannis Laouris.

== Stances and principles ==
The party supports direct democracy and e-democracy.

=== Criticism of the four elected MPs ===
The four elected members of the party in the Cypriot parliament are accused of betraying Direct Democracy principles, because their very first action was to vote for the president of the parliament without asking the Agora App, and because they deny to put themselves in a digital recall election. The members apologized in the official podcast of direct democracy party.

=== The Party's president requested for police protection ===
The party's president Fidias Panayiotou, although never having requested protection before, requested the protection from the Cyprus Police.

== Electoral results ==
=== Parliament ===
House of Representatives
Election	Votes			Seats	
Election	#	%	Rank	#	±
2026	20,159	5.42	6th	4 / 56	New
