= Christiana Erotokritou =

Cypriot politician & lawyer (born 1973)

- Χριστιάνα Ερωτοκρίτου

Deputy Chair of the Democratic Party of Cyprus
- Incumbent
- Assumed office 2018

Member of the Cypriot House of Representatives
- Incumbent
- Assumed office 2016
- Constituency: Nicosia

Spokesperson of the Democratic Party of Cyprus
- In office 2014–2018

Personal details
- Born: 24 May 1973 (age 53)

Christiana Erotokritou (Greek: Χριστιάνα Ερωτοκρίτου; born 24 May 1973) is a Cypriot politician and lawyer. She has served as a member of the House of Representatives of Cyprus since 2016.

== Biography ==
Erotokritou grew up in Nicosia and graduated from the English School in 1991. She studied law at the University of Wolverhampton and obtained the title of Barrister at Law at Lincoln's Inn in London. Since her youth, she has been a member of the Democratic Party.

Erotokritou has served in the Democratic Party Executive Office since 2003. She was appointed Party Spokesperson in 2013, a post she held until 2016.

In the parliamentary elections of 2016, Erotokritou was elected lawmaker for Nicosia District with Democratic Party. During her tenure, she has served as a member of the Selection Committee, the Parliamentary Committee on Human Rights and Equal Opportunities for Men and Women, the Parliamentary Committee on Foreign and European Affairs, the Parliamentary Committee on Legal Affairs, the Ad Hoc Parliamentary Committee on the Compliance of the Parliament's Rules of Procedure and an alternate of the Special Parliamentary Committee on the Middle East. She is also an alternate member of the Parliament delegation to the Parliamentary Assembly of the Council of Europe.

Erotokritou was elected deputy chairman of DIKO in the party's 2018 internal elections.
