= 2026 Cypriot legislative election =

- 24 May 2026

56 of the 80 seats in the House of Representatives 29 seats needed for a majority
- Turnout: 66.91% (▲1.19 pp)
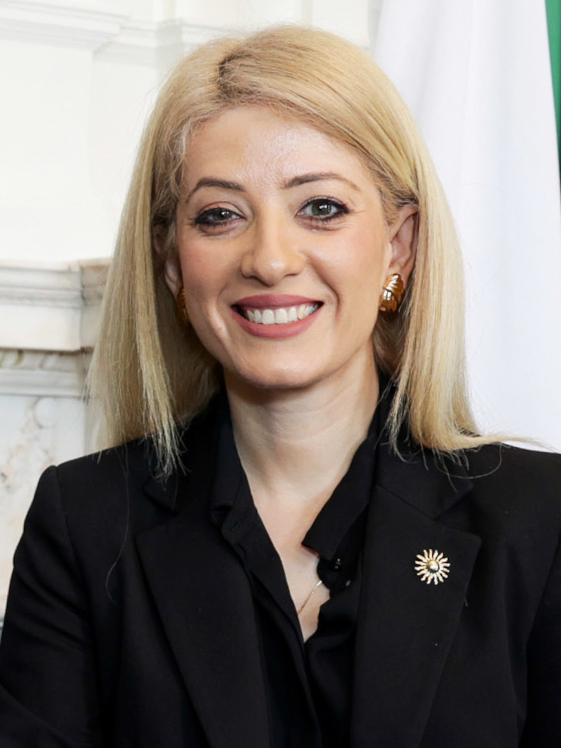

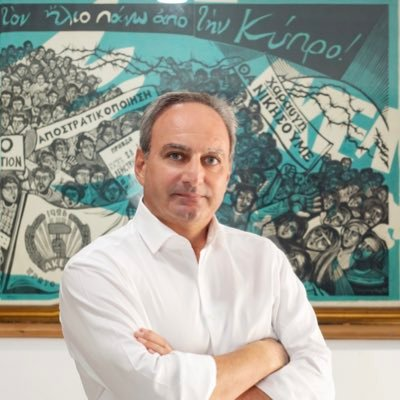

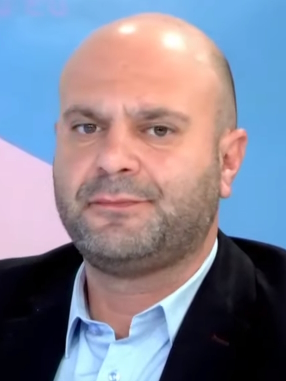

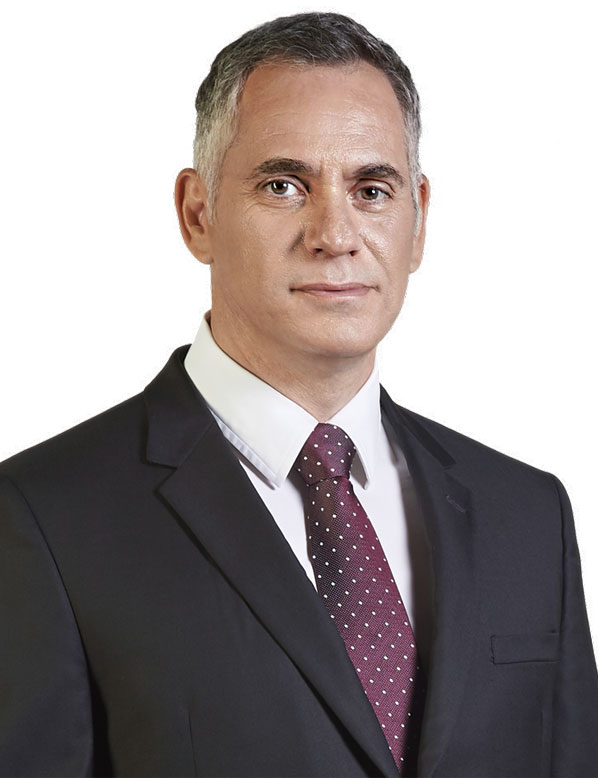

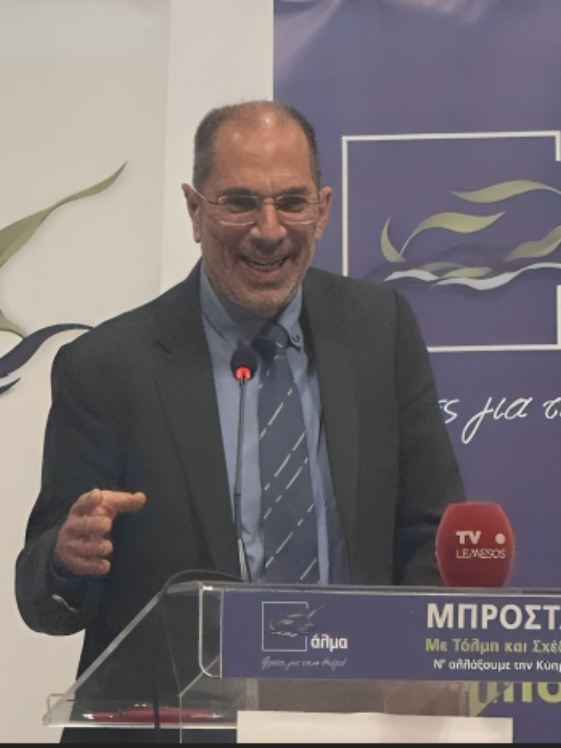

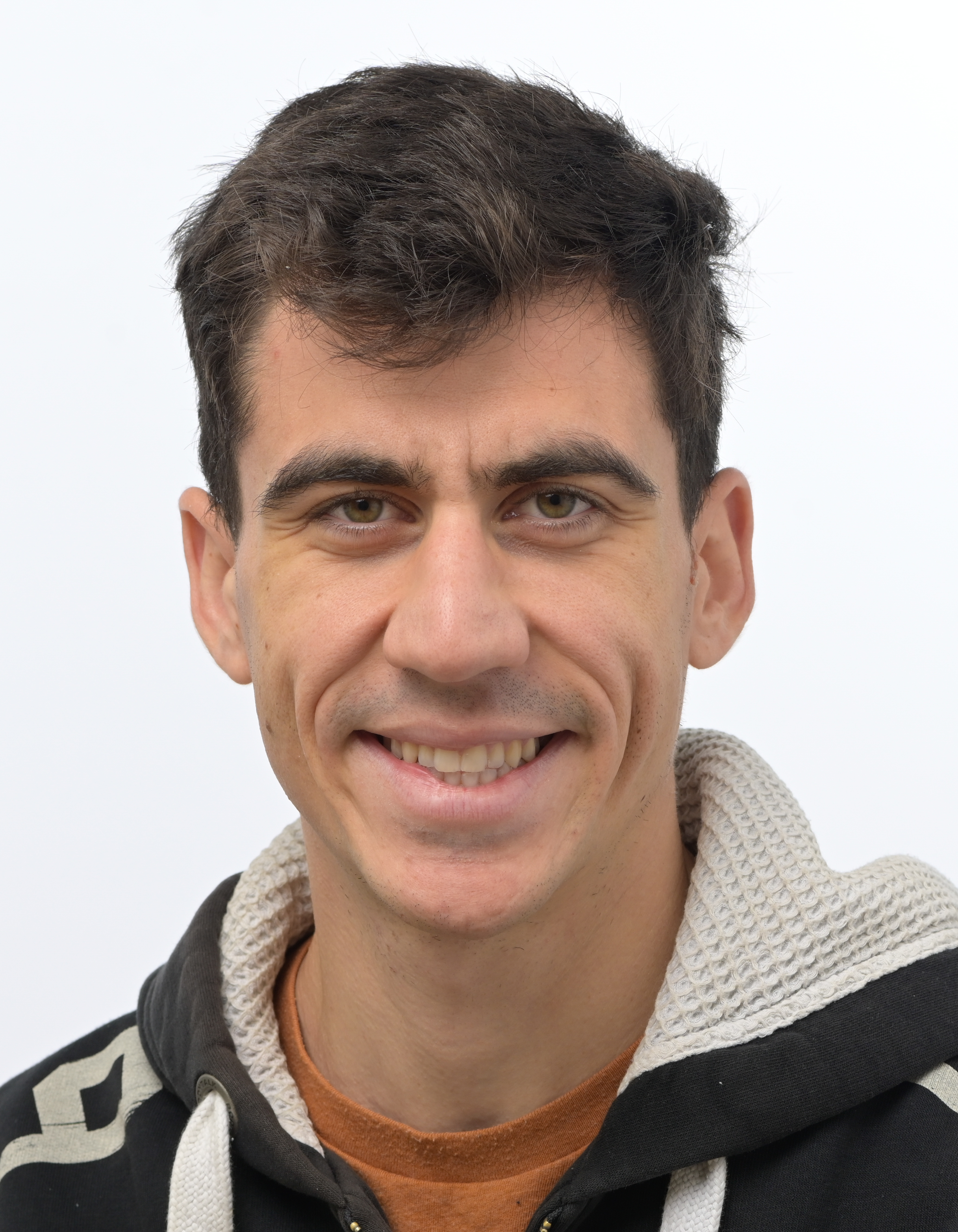
	First party	Second party	Third party
Leader	Annita Demetriou	Stefanos Stefanou	Christos Christou
Party	DISY	AKEL	ELAM
Leader since	11 March 2023	4 July 2021	2008
Last election	17 seats, 27.8%	15 seats, 22.3%	4 seats, 6.8%
Seats won	17	15	8
Seat change	Steady	Steady	▲4
Popular vote	101,016	88,775	40,567
Percentage	27.2%	23.9%	10.9%
Swing	▼0.6%	▲1.4%	▲4.0%
	Fourth party	Fifth party	Sixth party
Leader	Nikolas Papadopoulos	Odysseas Michaelides	Fidias Panayiotou
Party	DIKO	ALMA	ADK
Leader since	30 November 2013	19 May 2025	20 October 2025
Last election	9 seats, 11.3%	Did not exist	Did not exist
Seats won	8	4	4
Seat change	▼1	New	New
Popular vote	37,222	21,700	20,159
Percentage	10.0%	5.8%	5.4%
Swing	▼1.3%	New	New
- Constituency-based election results
President of the House of Representatives before election
Annita Demetriou
DISY
Elected President of the House of Representatives
Annita Demetriou
DISY

Parliamentary elections were held in Cyprus on 24 May 2026 to elect 56 of the 80 members of the House of Representatives.

The election marked little change for the largest parties, despite strong anti-establishment feeling among the electorate and the parties' internal struggles in their respective campaigns ahead of the vote; the centre-right Democratic Rally (DISY) led by Annita Demetriou (who won a plurality of seats) and their main rivals, the Stefanos Stefanou-led communist Progressive Party of Working People (AKEL), both retained the same number of seats and the centrist Democratic Party (DIKO) lost one seat compared to the previous election in 2021.

The election was marked by the relative success of the far-right National People's Front (ELAM) who became the joint-third largest party. The biggest impacts were on the smaller parties, in particular centrist parties supporting the incumbent president Nikos Christodoulides. The EDEK Socialist Party, Democratic Alignment (DIPA), and the Movement of Ecologists (KOSP) each lost all their seats, and so are no longer represented in the Parliament of Cyprus. They were in turn replaced by new political parties which entered the legislature for the first time; ALMA, who ran on an accountability and anti-corruption platform, and Direct Democracy (ADK), a party founded by a social media personality.

== Electoral system ==
The 80 members of the House of Representatives are elected from six multi-member constituencies which correspond to the six districts of Cyprus, with the number of seats allocated according to the population of each area. Of the 80 seats, 56 are elected by Greek Cypriots and 24 by Turkish Cypriots. However, since the Cyprus crisis of 1963–64 and the subsequent Turkish invasion of Cyprus in 1974, no ballots have been held for the Turkish Cypriot seats, which are left unfilled. Therefore the House of Representatives has de facto 56 seats.

The election used an open list form of proportional representation. Voters were asked to choose their preferred party list then cast preferential votes for candidates on that list – one for every four seats available in their constituency. Party leaders (or other coalition leaders) are not required to receive preferential votes to be elected. Seats are allocated using the Hare quota, with any remaining seats allocated to parties and lists that cleared a threshold. The seat allocation for the 2026 election was:

Districts	Seats
Nicosia	19
Limassol	12
Famagusta	11
Larnaca	6
Paphos	5
Kyrenia	3
Total	56

== Contesting parties and candidates ==
Party	Ideology	Leader	Seats		Status
Party	Ideology	Leader	Last election	Before election	Status
Democratic Rally (DISY)	Liberal conservatism	Annita Demetriou	17 / 56	17 / 56	Opposition
Progressive Party of Working People (AKEL)	Communism, Cypriotism	Stefanos Stefanou	15 / 56	14 / 56	Opposition
Democratic Party (DIKO)	Centrism	Nicholas Papadopoulos	9 / 56	11 / 56	Governing coalition
National Popular Front (ELAM)	Ultranationalism, neo-fascism	Christos Christou	4 / 56	3 / 56	Opposition
Democratic Alignment (DIPA)	Liberalism, centrism	Marios Garoyian	4 / 56	3 / 56	Governing coalition
Movement for Social Democracy (EDEK)	Social democracy	Nikos Anastasiou	4 / 56	2 / 56	Governing coalition
Movement of Ecologists – Citizens' Cooperation (KOSP)	Green politics	Stavros Papadouris	3 / 56	2 / 56	Opposition
Volt Cyprus (VOLT)	Pro-Europeanism, European federalism, united Cyprus, progressivism	Andromachi Sophocleous Panos Loizou Parras	0 / 56	1 / 56	Opposition
Democratic National Movement (DEK)	Ultraconservatism	Andreas Themistocleous	0 / 56	1 / 56	Opposition
ALMA – Citizens for Cyprus (ALMA)	Liberalism, centrism	Odysseas Michaelides	0 / 56	1 / 56	Opposition
Direct Democracy Cyprus (ADK)	Direct democracy, E-democracy	Fidias Panayiotou	0 / 56	0 / 56	Opposition
Active Citizens – Movement of Cypriot United Hunters (KEKK)	Green conservatism, Agrarianism, Social conservatism	Nikolas Prodromou	0 / 56	0 / 56	Opposition

=== Democratic Rally ===
The centre-right Democratic Rally (DISY) is the largest political party in Cyprus, holding 17 of the 56 seats in the House of Representatives. Following its defeat in the 2023 presidential election and internal divisions resulting from the independent candidacy of former DISY member Nikos Christodoulides, the party's stance as the official opposition has been perceived as ambiguous. Several of Christodoulides' ministers are active DISY members, and on occasions, such as the 2024 National Budget, DISY made fewer amendments to the President's proposal compared to the governing parties. This perceived lack of opposition has contributed to public dissatisfaction with DISY's role in countering the Christodoulides administration, which has faced increasing unpopularity.

During the candidate selection process for the 2024 European Parliament Election, DISY's internal elections resulted in one of the then-vice presidents, Marios Pelekanos, finishing second to last, excluding him from the six-candidate ballot. Dissatisfied with the outcome, Pelekanos resigned from his leadership position, citing a series of incidents that, according to him, undermined his standing within the party. On 22 March 2024, it was announced following multi-day discussions with ELAM (National Popular Front) that Pelekanos would be running in the European elections under ELAM's banner. This decision was condemned by DISY leader Annita Demetriou, who emphasised the ideological differences between the two parties. DISY subsequently removed Pelekanos from its membership registry. Pelekanos, who had also served as the government spokesperson during the DISY-backed Anastasiades' administration (2021–2023), ultimately became ELAM's Press Representative. Despite DISY securing a first-place finish in the European elections, their 24.8% share of the vote marked the worst performance in the party's history.

DISY continued to face internal challenges after the European elections, notably between Averof Neofytou, the party's former leader and its presidential candidate in 2023, and Nicos Anastasiades, former party leader and President of Cyprus from 2013 to 2023. In a podcast on July 8, 2024, Anastasiades criticised Neofytou's 2023 presidential campaign, suggesting that it had failed to resonate with DISY supporters, contributing to the party's defeat. He also questioned Neofytou's alignment with AKEL-backed candidate Andreas Mavroyiannis during the second round of the election, to which Neofytou failed to qualify. Anastasiades' remark that he did not want to "bother with bitter people," directed at Neofytou, prompted a response from Neofytou on social media, stating that the "bitter" ones were the thousands who had once trusted Anastasiades, along with broader criticisms of Anastasiades' handling of the Cyprus problem.

Neofytou also clashed with current DISY leader Annita Demetriou over the party's support for the Great Sea Interconnector, a planned HVDC interconnector between the Greek, Cypriot, and Israeli power grids. The project, primarily developed during the DISY-backed Anastasiades' presidency, has strong backing from DISY. However, Neofytou expressed strong disagreement about advancing energy projects before resolving the Cyprus problem and questioned whether the interconnection will actually reduce energy bills in Cyprus. This stance put him at odds with Demetriou, who strongly supports the project. In September 2024, when asked about Neofytou's potential candidacy for the 2028 presidential election—following his own expressed interest—Annita Demetriou responded that Neofytou had already been tested in 2023, and in light of the public's verdict, DISY should now move forward for the benefit of the country.

Prominent MPs Averof Neofytou, Efthymios Diplaros, and Harris Georgiades have announced that they will not seek re-election in the upcoming legislative election, in adherence to the party statute's 3-term-limit. However, they intend to remain politically active.

=== Progressive Party of Working People ===
The Progressive Party of Working People (AKEL), the second-largest party in Cyprus with 15 of the 56 seats in the House of Representatives, experienced its worst-ever performance in the 2024 European Parliament Election, garnering only 21.5% of the vote and losing one of its two seats for the first time in its history. Despite AKEL's strong showing in the 2023 presidential election, with candidate Andreas Mavroyiannis surpassing polling expectations, internal tensions have emerged since then.

Irene Charalambidou, a prominent AKEL member of Parliament, has increasingly distanced herself from the party's positions, frequently voting independently in the House of Representatives. The rift between Charalambidou and AKEL deepened during the controversy over the dismissal of Odysseas Michaelides, the former Auditor General of Cyprus. Charalambidou is a longstanding supporter of Michaelides due to his efforts against perceived corruption during the Anastasiades administration. The MP is ineligible to run for AKEL in the 2026 legislative elections due to term limits, and there are widespread rumours that she may join a new parliamentary movement led by Michaelides, who has garnered popularity for his anti-corruption stance. An opinion poll conducted by RetailZoom from October 14 to 16, 2024, indicated that a hypothetical new party led by Odysseas Michaelides would secure second place in the next legislative election, receiving 21% of the vote.

AKEL rebranded itself as "AKEL – Social Alliance" for the 2024 European Parliament Election, following a merger with several smaller left-leaning parties. The party intends to keep this structure for the next legislative election, with its parliamentary candidates ranging from the political centre to the traditional left.

=== National People's Front ===
The far-right party ELAM is expected to strengthen its presence in the House of Representatives, with opinion polls projecting a third-place finish, surpassing for the first time the centrist Democratic Party. Once considered a fringe movement, over the last few years ELAM has gained increasing support from mainstream right-wing voters. Notably, former DISY vice-president Marios Pelekanos was appointed as ELAM's Press Representative, signaling broader appeal beyond its traditional base.

In January 2025, independent MP Andreas Themistokleous, who was previously elected with ELAM but later expelled for "inappropriate behavior", announced the formation of a new political party named the Democratic National Movement. The new party espouses a platform emphasizing religious conservatism, nationalism, and strong opposition to progressive social policies ("anti-woke"). It is anticipated to attract support from traditional ELAM voters, potentially impacting ELAM's projected growth. As of September 2025, this has not happened.

=== ALMA – Citizens for Cyprus ===
ALMA (an acronym for Dignity, Accountability, Reform, and Development) is a new political movement founded in May 2025 by former Auditor General Odysseas Michaelides. Positioned within the reformist centre and opposition space, ALMA was established with the aim of achieving systemic restructuring and political transparency in Cyprus. The party has announced its intention to contest the 2026 legislative elections as its first electoral test, with Michaelides aiming for a strong parliamentary presence as a step toward a potential presidential bid in 2028. ALMA advocates for a federal solution to the Cyprus problem in line with UN resolutions and EU principles, and has drawn speculation about future alliances, particularly with MP Irene Charalambidou, a known supporter of Michaelides who has distanced herself from her current party AKEL.

=== Volt Cyprus ===
Volt is a new political party that forms part of the pan-European Volt Europa movement and presents itself as strongly pro-European and progressive. This is the first time it is standing in the general election, and in February it unveiled its list of 56 candidates. The average age of the candidates is 48.8, and 41.1% of the list are women. Volt's MP Alexandra Attalides, originally elected as a member of Movement of Ecologists – Citizens' Cooperation, is standing for re-election in the Nicosia district. The party advocates for the immediate resumption and intensification of talks toward a bi-zonal, bi-communal federation with political equality, based on UN resolutions and the European acquis.

=== Retiring MPs ===
18 MPs are not seeking reelection.

- Efthymios Diplaros (DISY)
- Averof Neofytou (DISY)
- Nicos Tornaritis (DISY)
- Charis Georgiades (DISY)
- Onouphrios Koullas (DISY)
- Kyriacos Chatzigiannis (DISY)
- Nikos Sykas (DISY), removed from parties list.
- Andros Kyprianou (AKEL)
- Andros Kafkalias (AKEL)
- Kostas Kosta (AKEL)
- Christos Christofias (AKEL)
- Pavlos Mylonas (DIKO)
- Christos Orfanides (DIKO)
- Ilias Myrianthous (EDEK)
- Marinos Sizopoulos (EDEK)
- Kostis Efstathiou (Independent), expelled from EDEK
- Charalambos Theopemptou (KOSP)
- Marios Garoyian (DiPa), leader of DiPa

=== Party-switching MPs ===
Four MPs have switched their party to stand with a different one.

- Irene Charalambidou, formerly of AKEL to ALMA
- Andreas Apostolou, formerly of EDEK to DIKO
- Michalis Giakoumis, formerly of DiPa, to DIKO.
- Alexandra Attalides formerly KOSP to Volt

== Campaign ==
In a report published in March by the OSCE's Office for Democratic Institutions and Human Rights (ODIHR), international observers criticised unregulated social media campaigns, weak oversight of campaign finance and the exclusion of independent observers.

== Opinion polls ==
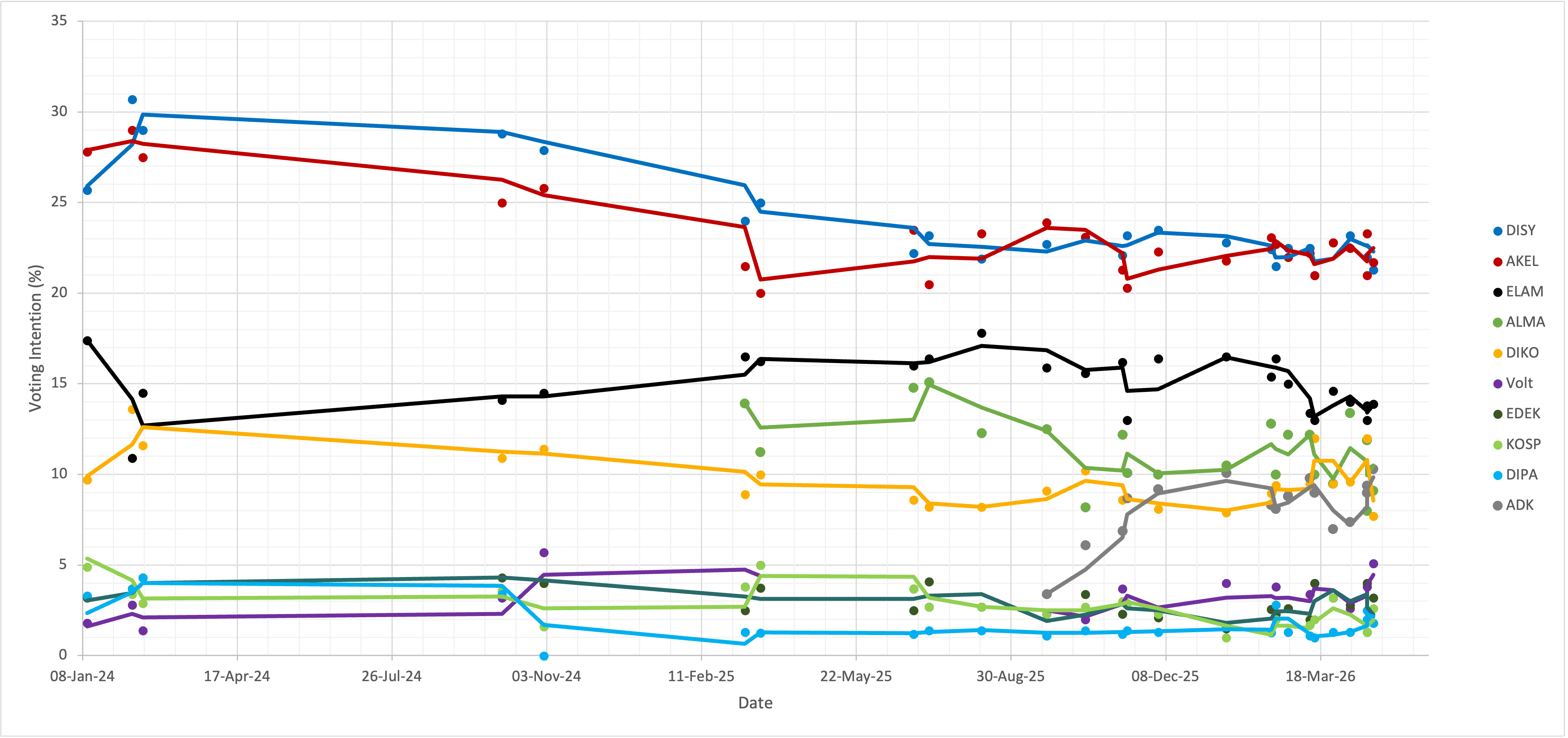

Fieldwork date	Polling firm	DISY	AKEL	DIKO	ELAM	EDEK	DIPA	KOSP	KEKK	APC	Volt	ALMA	ADK	Others	Lead
24 May 2026	2026 legislative election	27.15	23.86	10.00	10.90	3.25	3.14	1.95	3.20	– (Note: with KOSP)	3.09	5.83	5.42	2.21	3.29
11–15 May 2026	Stratego-IMR for Kathimerini	23.0	19.9	8.7	13.3	2.4	1.5	2.4	1.5	–	4.6	9.9	7.6	4.7	3.1
6–13 May 2026	Explorer for Philenews	23.1	22.2	9.8	13.6	2.4	1.4	2.4	1.3	–	3.8	9.8	7.9	2.4	0.9
6–13 May 2026	Pulse for Omega	23.3	21.5	8.6	13.5	3.7	3.1	2.5	1.8	–	4.9	8.0	7.4	1.5	1.8
1–12 May 2026	Noverna for Politis	21.8	20.2	8.1	13.4	4.0	3.0	2.2	2.8	–	4.1	8.9	10.7	0.8	1.6
1–11 May 2026	RAI Consultants for Alpha Cyprus	24.5	20.5	9.7	14.4	2.6	2.6	2.0	3.6	–	4.2	7.8	5.9	2.0	4.0
30 Apr – 10 May 2026	IMR for Reporter	23.3	21.1	8.5	14.0	2.5	1.4	2.4	1.4	–	4.5	10.7	7.5	2.7	2.2
28 Apr – 10 May 2026	CYMAR for ANT1	22	22	12	15	2	1	2	1	–	5	6	7	3	Tie
2–9 May 2026	Prime for SIGMA	23.2	22.7	9.5	12.9	3.0	2.2	2.4	1.3	–	4.6	10.3	8.0	1.3	0.5
5–8 May 2026	Analytica for Cyprus Times	19.0	17.8	9.7	14.7	3.5	3.4	2.4	2.5	–	4.5	8.1	10.1	4.3	1.2
4–6 May 2026	RealPolls for CyprusMedia/OLOI	19.7	17.5	7.8	14.0	3.9	3.7	2.7	2.8	–	7.2	9.4	8.7	2.1	2.2
1–3 May 2026	Stratego-IMR for Kathimerini	23.6	21.4	8.6	14.6	2.7	1.4	2.4	1.4	–	4.9	10.3	6.6	1.9	2.2
9–24 Apr 2026	Analytica for Cyprus Times	19.6	18.4	8.6	13.0	3.9	2.3	2.5	3.0	–	4.1	9.5	11.5	3.6	1.2
14–21 Apr 2026	Pulse for Omega	21.3	20.0	7.5	13.8	3.1	1.9	3.1	1.9	–	4.4	11.8	8.8	2.5	1.3
7–21 Apr 2026	RAI Consultants for Alpha Cyprus	21.3	21.7	7.7	13.9	3.2	1.8	2.6	2.8	–	5.1	9.1	10.3	0.5	0.4
14–17 Apr 2026	Prime for SIGMA	23.3	23.3	9.4	13.8	2.5	1.3	1.3	–	–	3.8	11.9	9.4	2.5	Tie
6–17 Apr 2026	CYMAR for ANT1	22	21	12	13	4	2	2	2	–	4	8	9	2	1
6 Apr 2026	APC announce they will participate on the KOSP list at the next legislative election														
30 Mar – 6 Apr 2026	Explorer for Philenews	23.2	22.5	9.6	14.0	2.8	1.3	1.3	–	–	2.6	13.4	7.4	1.9	0.7
10–26 Mar 2026	MRC Cypronetwork for RIK	22.8	22.8	9.5	14.6	3.2	1.3	3.2	1.3	0.6	3.2	9.5	7.0	1.3	Tie
6–14 Mar 2026	CYMAR for ANT1	21	21	12	13	4	1	2	1	–	4	12	9	2	Tie
26 Feb – 11 Mar 2026	Noverna for Politis	22.5	22.2	9.5	13.4	2.0	1.1	1.7	1.5	–	3.4	12.2	9.8	0.7	0.3
1–8 Mar 2026	IMR for Reporter	22.0	21.8	8.8	15.7	2.3	1.0	3.1	1.3	–	3.9	12.3	6.2	1.5	0.2
2–7 Mar 2026	Pulse for Omega	21.8	20.5	9.0	14.1	3.8	1.3	2.6	1.3	–	3.8	10.3	9.0	2.6	1.3
11–27 Feb 2026	MRC Cypronetwork for RIK	22.5	21.9	8.1	15.0	3.1	1.3	3.1	0.6	0.6	3.8	10.6	8.8	0.6	0.6
17–25 Feb 2026	Analytica for Cyprus Times	20.8	20.6	8.3	13.8	3.2	3.6	2.6	–	–	3.9	11.2	9.7	2.3	0.2
17–25 Feb 2026	Explorer for Philenews	22.5	22.0	8.9	15.0	2.6	1.3	1.3	–	–	2.6	12.2	8.8	2.6	0.5
9–17 Feb 2026	RAI Consultants for Alpha Cyprus	21.5	22.7	9.4	16.4	2.3	2.8	2.0	0.8	0.2	3.8	10.0	8.1	0.1	1.2
6–14 Feb 2026	Prime for SIGMA	22.4	23.1	9.0	15.4	2.6	1.3	1.3	–	–	2.6	12.8	8.3	1.3	0.7
25 Jan – 9 Feb 2025	Noverna for Politis	23.6	21.7	8.6	13.7	2.7	0.7	1.2	1.0	1.2	2.6	10.2	12.2	0.7	1.9
12–17 Jan 2026	MRC Cypronetwork for RIK	22.2	20.9	7.8	14.4	3.3	1.3	3.3	1.3	2.0	2.6	11.8	8.5	0.7	1.3
10–16 Jan 2026	RAI Consultants for Alpha Cyprus	22.8	21.8	7.9	16.5	1.5	1.6	1.0	1.3	0.7	4.0	10.5	10.1	0.3	1.0
27 Nov – 3 Dec 2025	Stratego-IMR for Kathimerini	23.5	22.3	8.1	16.4	2.1	1.3	2.3	1.4	–	2.4	10.0	9.2	1.0	1.2
4–13 Nov 2025	Pulse for Omega	23.2	20.3	8.7	13.0	2.9	1.4	2.9	1.4	–	2.9	10.1	8.7	4.3	2.9
3–10 Nov 2025	IMR for Reporter	22.1	21.3	8.6	16.2	2.3	1.2	3.0	1.6	–	3.7	12.2	6.9	1.0	0.8
29 Sep – 17 Oct 2025	MRC Cypronetwork for RIK	23.1	23.1	10.2	15.6	3.4	1.4	2.7	2.0	1.4	2.0	8.2	6.1	0.7	Tie
3–8 Oct 2025	RetailZoom for Politis	23.6	20.2	9.0	15.7	2.2	2.2	3.4	1.1	1.1	6.7	14.6	–	–	3.4
12–22 Sep 2025	Stratego-IMR for Kathimerini	22.7	23.9	9.1	15.9	1.1	1.1	2.3	1.1	–	2.3	12.5	3.4	4.5	1.2
8–31 Jul 2025	MRC Cypronetwork	21.9	23.3	8.2	17.8	2.7	1.4	2.7	2.7	1.4	2.7	12.3	–	2.7	1.4
1–8 Jul 2025	Symmetron for 2Dots	23.2	20.5	8.2	16.4	4.1	1.4	2.7	–	–	2.7	15.1	–	5.5	2.7
24–28 Jun 2025	IMR for Reporter	22.2	23.5	8.6	16.0	2.5	1.2	3.7	1.2	–	3.7	14.8	–	2.5	1.3
10–21 Mar 2025	Prime for Redwolf	25.0	20.0	10.0	16.3	3.8	1.3	5.0	–	–	5.0	11.3	–	2.5	5.0
7–12 Mar 2025	Symmetron for 2Dots	27.6	23.6	8.8	15.1	4.2	3.2	3.9	–	–	4.2	–	–	9.3	4.0
5–11 Mar 2025	IMR for Reporter	24.0	21.5	8.9	16.5	2.5	1.3	3.8	1.3	–	3.8	13.9	–	2.5	2.5
21 Oct – 1 Nov 2024	Rai Consultants for Alpha Cyprus	27.9	25.8	11.4	14.5	4.0	–	1.6	1.4	0.9	5.7	–	–	7.7	2.1
14–16 Oct 2024	RetailZoom for Politis	23.5	11.1	3.7	9.9	1.2	1.2	2.5	–	1.2	14.8	20.1	–	10.8	3.4
25 Sep – 5 Oct 2024	Symmetron for 2Dots	28.8	25.0	10.9	14.1	4.3	3.4	3.6	–	–	3.2	–	–	6.6	3.8
9 June 2024	2024 EP election	24.78	21.49	9.72	11.19	5.07	2.17	1.29	1.25	0.27	2.92	–	–	19.86	3.29
12–16 Feb 2024	SIGMA	29.0	27.5	11.6	14.5	4.3	4.3	2.9	–	1.4	1.4	–	–	2.9	1.5
2–9 Feb 2024	Symmetron for Kathimerini	30.7	29.0	13.6	10.9	3.7	3.7	3.4	–	–	2.8	–	–	1.9	1.7
3–11 Jan 2024	IMR for Reporter	25.7	27.8	9.7	17.4	3.2	3.3	4.9	0.7	–	1.8	–	–	2.8	2.1
18–22 Sep 2023	IMR for Reporter	26.1	28.0	10.1	17.4	2.9	1.4	5.8	1.4	–	1.4	–	–	4.4	1.9
30 May 2021	2021 legislative election	27.77	22.34	11.29	6.78	6.72	6.10	4.41	3.27	1.00	–	–	–	10.32	5.43

== Results ==
The centre-right Democratic Rally retained 17 seats, and the communist Progressive Party of Working People received 15 seats, both the same as in the previous election. The far-right ELAM received eight seats, four more than before and making them the joint-third largest party. The Democratic Party also won eight seats, down one from 2021. ALMA and Direct Democracy Cyprus entered the legislature for the first time, with both parties gaining four seats.

The EDEK Socialist Party, Democratic Alignment, and the Movement of Ecologists lost all their seats (a total of 11 between them). The Active Citizens Movement, the Democratic National Movement, and Volt Cyprus did not reach the minimum 3.6% threshold to gain a seat. The turnout of the election was 66.91%, an increase of 1.19 percentage points from the previous election.

Party	Votes	%	Seats	+/–
Democratic Rally	101,013	27.15	17	0
Progressive Party of Working People	88,777	23.86	15	0
National People's Front	40,567	10.90	8	+4
Democratic Party	37,222	10.00	8	–1
ALMA – Citizens for Cyprus	21,700	5.83	4	New
Direct Democracy Cyprus	20,159	5.42	4	New
EDEK Socialist Party	12,099	3.25	0	–4
Active Citizens – Movement of Cypriot United Hunters	11,890	3.20	0	0
Democratic Alignment	11,693	3.14	0	–4
Volt Cyprus	11,487	3.09	0	New
Movement of Ecologists – Citizens' Cooperation	7,264	1.95	0	–3
Democratic National Movement	2,628	0.71	0	New
Stand Up	1,897	0.51	0	New
Agronómos Agricultural Labour Party	1,044	0.28	0	New
Democratic Change	1,020	0.27	0	New
Green Party of Cyprus	509	0.14	0	New
Patriotic Front "Lacedaemonians"	494	0.13	0	New
Far-Left Resistance Communism	39	0.01	0	New
People's Struggle for Freedom	33	0.01	0	New
Independents	525	0.14	0	0
Total	372,060	100.00	56	0
Valid votes	372,060	97.69		
Invalid votes	6,621	1.74		
Blank votes	2,170	0.57		
Total votes	380,851	100.00		
Registered voters/turnout	569,182	66.91		
Source: Central Elections Service

=== Distribution by constituency ===
Constituency	DISY		AKEL		ELAM		DIKO		ALMA		ADK	
Constituency	%	S	%	S	%	S	%	S	%	S	%	S
Nicosia	27.1	5	21.7	5	10.5	3	7.9	3	7.8	2	5.4	1
Limassol	25.3	4	21.7	3	10.7	2	10.7	1	6.3	1	6.9	1
Famagusta	28.5	3	26.5	3	13.5	2	7.9	1	3.9	1	5.1	1
Larnaca	26.6	2	29.4	2	10.8	1	14.0	1	3.6	0	5.1	0
Paphos	29.5	2	22.1	1	7.8	0	16.8	1	4.1	0	3.3	1
Kyrenia	26.3	1	27.8	1	9.1	0	10.3	1	6.2	0	5.2	0
Total	27.1	17	23.9	15	10.9	8	10.0	8	5.8	4	5.4	4

== Analysis ==
The election was mostly noted for the rise in support for the far-right strongly anti-Turkish ELAM party and the relative failure of the centrist and near-centrist parties such as DIKO, EDEK, and DIPA. Given that Cyprus has a presidential system, the balance of power is unlikely to change, however it was seen as test for the next presidential election in 2028, with the 3 centrist parties being in President Nikos Christodoulides' minority coalition.

However the strong anti-establishment vote did not materialise and the election is considered a success for the establishment parties, given that they received similar vote shares as in the previous election contrary to expectations. The election was also a success for new parties, such ALMA, who successfully ran on anti-corruption platform, and Direct Democracy which was founded by social media influencer and political outsider Fidias Panayiotou.

== Aftermath ==
EDEK leader Nikos Anastasiou resigned from party leadership following the loss of the party's legislative seats. Following the entry of Direct Democracy Cyprus into the House of Representatives, party leader Fidias Panayiotou promised to help make Cyprus better, stating that Cypriots desired new political formations in the legislature.

Notably disappointed, Volt's co-leaders, Panos Loizou Parras and Andromachi Sophocleous, acknowledged the party's election defeat, but at the same time emphasised that they were proud of what they had achieved and would be reviewing the result within the party's governing bodies.
