= Annita Demetriou =

Cypriot politician (born 1985)

- Αννίτα Δημητρίου
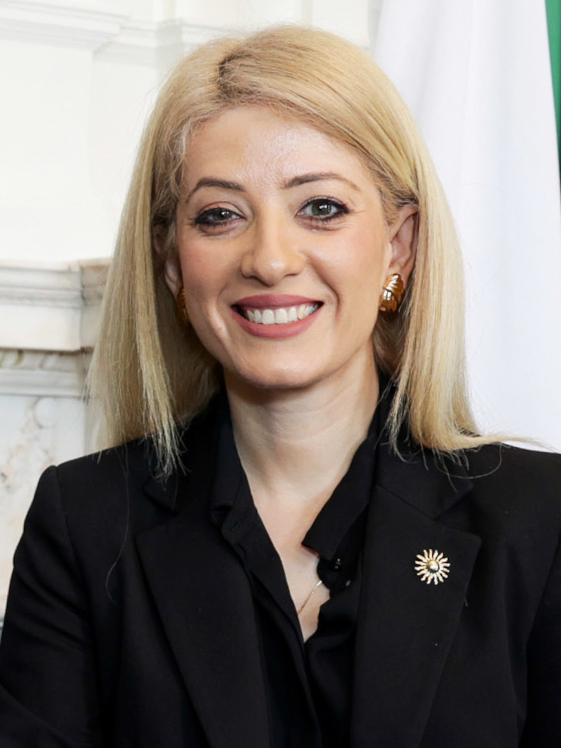
- Demetriou in 2023

President of the Cypriot House of Representatives
- Incumbent
- Assumed office 10 June 2021
- Preceded by: Adamos Adamou

President of the Democratic Rally
- Incumbent
- Assumed office 11 March 2023
- Preceded by: Averof Neofytou

Member of the Cypriot House of Representatives
- Incumbent
- Assumed office 2 June 2016
- Constituency: Larnaca

Personal details
- Born: 18 October 1985 (age 40) Troulloi, Cyprus
- Party: Democratic Rally
- Spouse: Andreas Kyprianou (m. 2013)
- Education: University of Cyprus; University of Kent
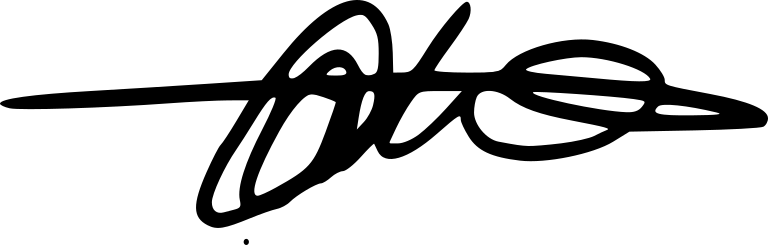
- Signature
- Website: www.annita.cy

Annita Demetriou (Greek: Αννίτα Δημητρίου; born 18 October 1985) is a Cypriot politician who has served as President of the Cypriot House of Representatives since June 2021 and as President of the Democratic Rally (DISY) since March 2023. The latter position effectively designates her the Leader of the Opposition to the incumbent Christodoulides government.

Demetriou has represented the Larnaca District in the House of Representatives since 2016. She is the first woman to serve as President of the House of Representatives and the youngest person to hold both that office and the presidency of DISY.

== Early life and education ==
Demetriou was born on 18 October 1985 in the village of Troulli, Larnaca District. She graduated with a degree in social and political science from the University of Cyprus in 2007 and a master's in international relations and European studies from the University of Kent.

== Career ==
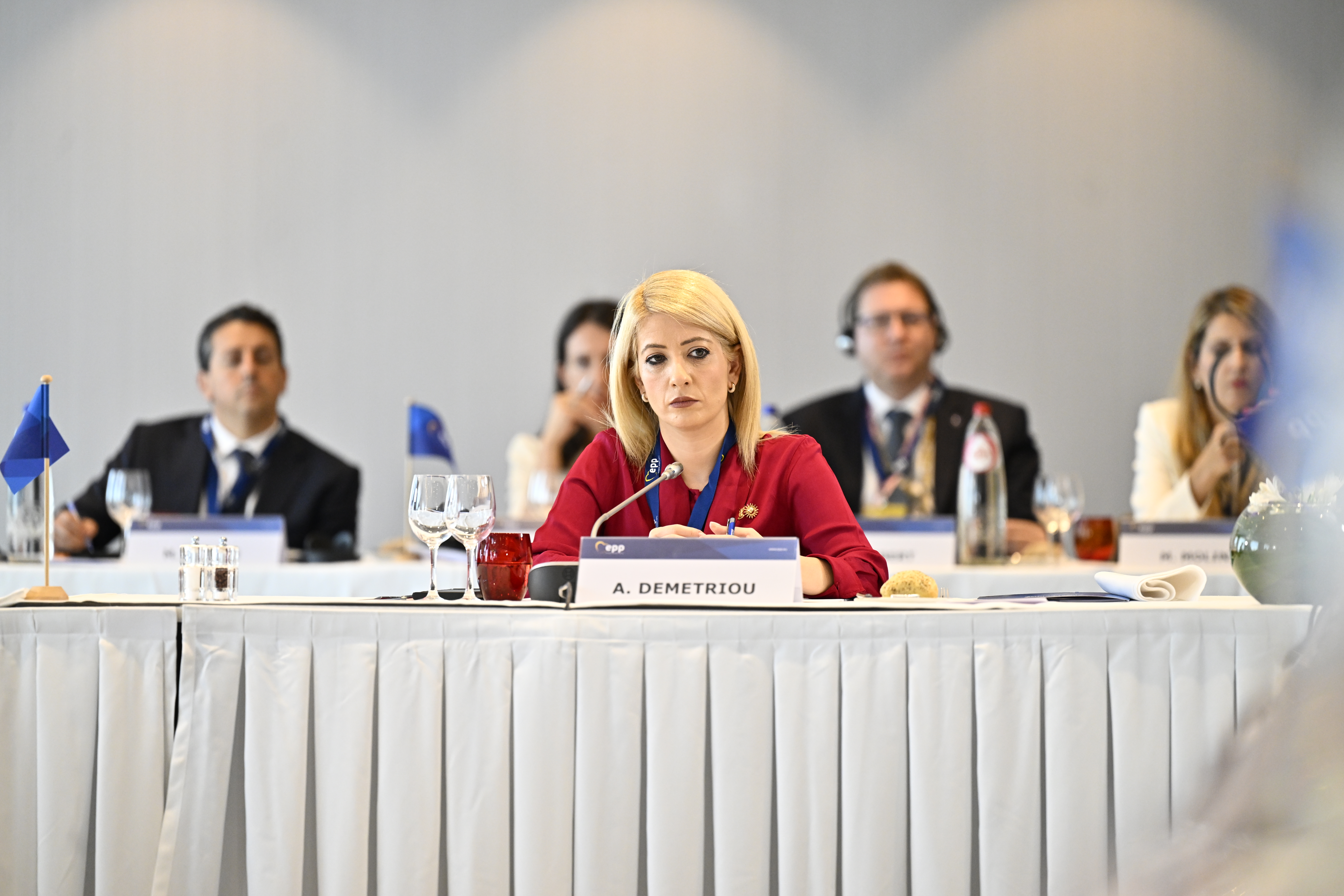
Demetriou's speech at the EPP Summit on 27 June 2024, in Brussels

Demetriou worked at the University of Cyprus as a Public Relations Officer and a lecturer in International Relations. She was a Special Associate at Capital TV presenting the Central News Bulletin.

Demetriou later became a member of the conservative Democratic Rally (DISY) party. She was a member of the Troulloi Community Council from 2012 until 2016, and was the first woman on the council. She first stood for election for parliament in 2016, and was initially removed from a list of potential candidates with party spokesman Prodromos Prodromou saying contesting an election was "not a beauty pageant." She was reinstated after pressure from party members at the removal of democratically elected nominees, and she was elected to parliament as representative for the Larnaca District in 2016, before being re-elected in 2021.

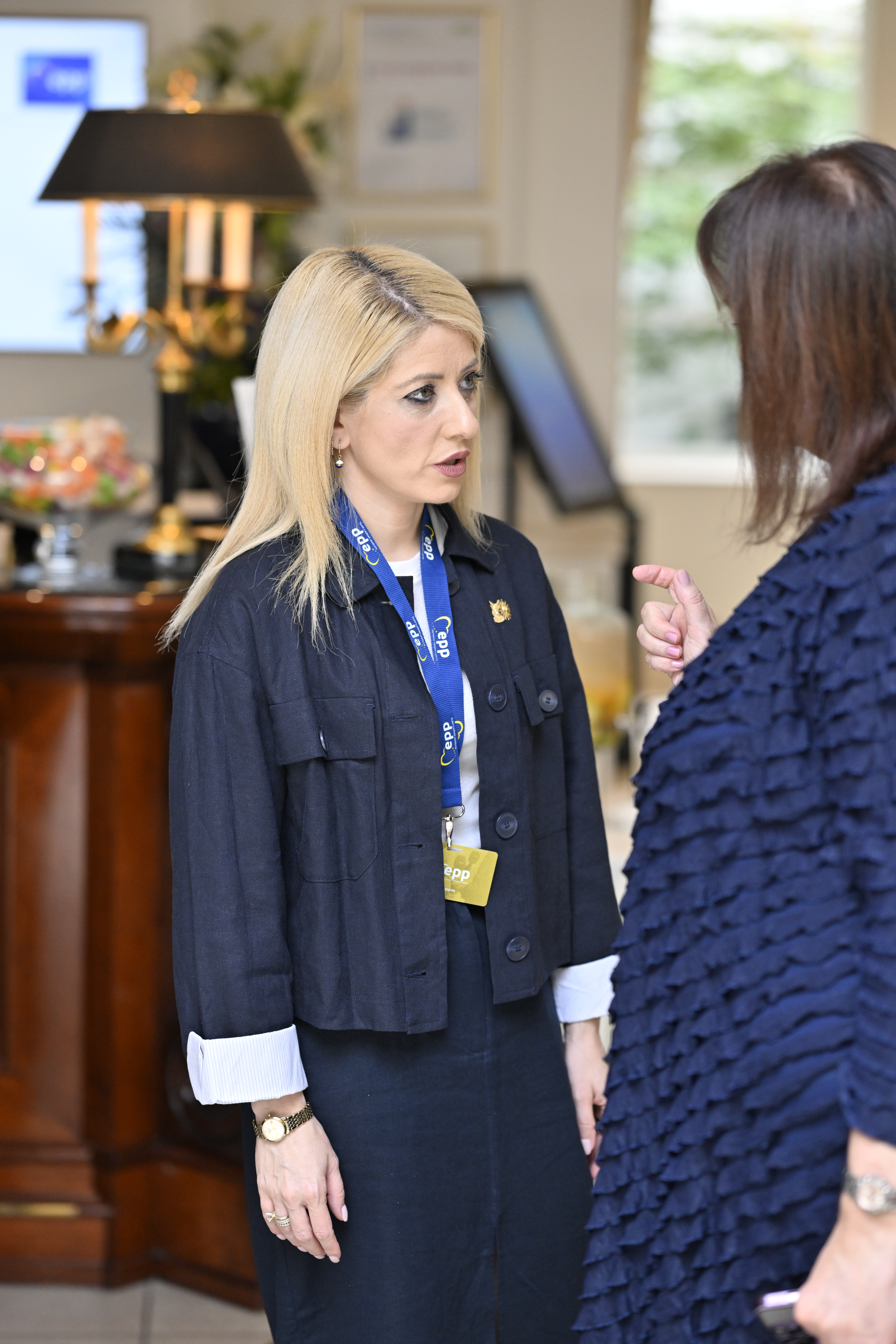
Annita Demetriou at the EPP Summit on 17 June 2024, in Brussels

Demetriou has been deputy chair of the Parliamentary Committee on Equal Opportunities between Men and Women and the Parliamentary Committee on Education and Culture. In 2018, she was spokesperson for Nicos Anastasiades during his campaign for President. She has been Vice President of DISY since February 2020. In April 2018, she was selected by the French government to participate in the 2018 United Nations Climate Change Conference, and in March 2020 she was an International Visitor Leadership Program observer for the United States primary elections. In July 2020, she worked with AKEL MP Skevi Koukouma to enact legislation that criminalised sexism and discrimination against women.

Demetriou was elected speaker of the House of Representatives on 10 June 2021 in the second round of voting from seven candidates, including front runner and left-wing AKEL party leader Andros Kyprianou, with support from the centrist Democratic Front and far-right ELAM parties. She received 25 votes from the 56 seat parliament, with 22 needed in the second round. She was the first and only female candidate and is the first woman, as well as the youngest person, to be elected to the position. There are only eight women in the parliament and President Anastasiades said her election sent "a strong message ... to all women of Cyprus, to all citizens of Cyprus, that women can and must strive for such positions because they deserve them." She is also the first DISY politician to hold the post, which has usually been held by a member of one of numerous opposition parties.

The Speaker of the House of Representatives is the second-highest office in the Cyprus after the President. In her first week in the role, Demetriou reduced the number of her personal bodyguards to 5, down from the 8 of her predecessor Adamos Adamou and 15 of his predecessor Demetris Syllouris.

Annita Demetriou was elected president of the Democratic Rally in 11 March 2023, after securing 69.18% of the votes of the DISY members. Her only opponent, Demetris Demetriou, lost with 30.82%.

== Presidency of the House of Representatives and of DISY ==
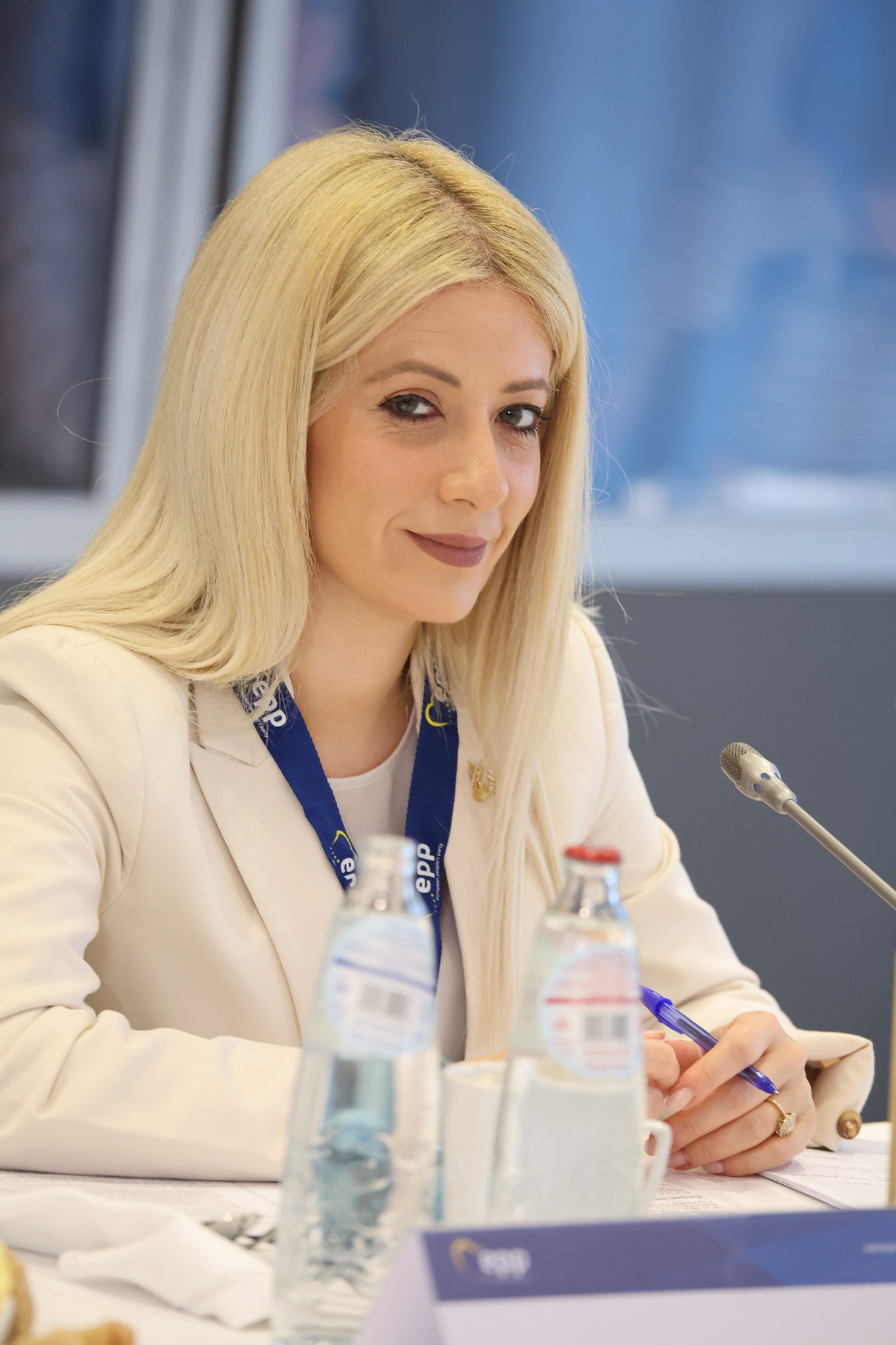
Demetriou at the EPP Summit in Brussels on 26 June 2025

In October 2021, she proposed a legislation to address violence against women by establishing the crime of femicide. The law, passed with 38 votes in favor and 4 against, introduced a penalty of life imprisonment for femicide.

On 12 May 2022, she submitted a bill to the Plenary of the House seeking to criminalise school bullying, by introducing a penalty of up to 12 months in prison or a fine of up to 2,000 euros.

On 8 February 2024, she proposed a law aimed at abolishing lifelong benefits provided to former Presidents of the Republic and Presidents of the House of Representatives, introducing conditions for their provision, and implementing security arrangements subject to assessment and periodic evaluation. The proposal also included limitations for the provision of service vehicles and secretarial services.

On 22 February 2024, she proposed a law aiming to introduce postal voting for the European Parliament Elections for residents abroad. This initiative is expected to increase participation rates in the elections and save resources by eliminating polling stations outside the country.

On 9 November 2024, Demetriou, as the leader of the opposition to the Christodoulides government, announced the establishment of a shadow cabinet for the first time in the history of Cyprus.

After the 2026 legislative election, in which DISY remained the winner, Demetriou was re-elected president of the House of Representatives on 4 June 2026.

== Public image ==
According to 2024 polls, Annita Demetriou is the most popular politician in Cyprus, with approval ratings averaging around 70%. This is the highest approval rating ever achieved by a DISY president.

Demetriou came under scrutiny in 2024 for a stance she took against Georgios Grivas (The leader of EOKA and founder of the Cypriot National Guard), EOKA and the Greek War of Independence, saying that enough is enough, discussing issues such as 1956 and 1821.

== Personal life ==
Demetriou is an ethnic Greek Cypriot. She has been married to Andreas Kyprianou since 2013.
