= ALMA – Citizens for Cyprus =

ALMA – Citizens for Cyprus ΑΛΜΑ – Πολίτες για την Κύπρο
- Abbreviation: ALMA
- Leader: Odysseas Michaelides
- Founded: 15 October 2025
- Ideology: Centrism; Reformism; Anti-corruption; Pro-Europeanism; Liberalism
- Political position: Centre
- European affiliation: European Democratic Party
- Colours: Green; Blue
- House of Representatives: 4 / 56
- European Parliament: 0 / 6
- Municipal Councils: 0 / 443

Website
- almacy.org

The ALMA – Citizens for Cyprus (Greek: ΑΛΜΑ – Πολίτες για την Κύπρο, romanized: ALMA – Polítes gia tin Kýpro, lit. 'Leap') is a centrist political party in Cyprus founded in 2025 by former Auditor General Odysseas Michaelides.

== History ==
=== Background ===
On 18 September 2024, Odysseas Michaelides was dismissed from his position as Auditor General by Supreme Constitutional Court on charges of misconduct. Michaelides held the post for 10 years and became a controversial figure in Cypriot politics, repeatedly clashing with government officials. Michaelides himself accused ex-President Nicos Anastasiades and current President Nikos Christodoulides of staying behind his removal. Michaelides' resignation was criticized by Cypriot parties such as AKEL, KOSP, DIKO, and Volt, who characterized him as an official who exposed corruption and advocated for transparency.

=== Founding ===
Several months after his removal, on 19 May 2025, Michaelides launched his party, ALMA – Citizens for Cyprus. It was established to contest the 2026 Cypriot legislative election and has presented itself as a long-term reform movement. The party's name, which translates as "leap," is also an acronym for Greek words meaning Dignity, Accountability, Reform, and Development. At the party's launch in Nicosia, Michaelides was accompanied by eight of his associates, including former Rector of the University of Cyprus Constantinos Christofides, who ran in the 2023 presidential election and finished sixth with 1.59% of the vote.

== Ideology ==
The party describes itself as belonging to the “reformist centre”, promoting institutional reform, transparency, accountability, the rule of law, a socially responsible but competitive economy, participatory democracy, and strong protection of human rights. Its ideology can therefore be broadly characterised as centrist, reformist, socially liberal, pro-rule of law, and anti-corruption.

The party was described by Europe Elects as centrist.

== Electoral results ==
=== Parliament ===
House of Representatives
Election	Votes			Seats	
Election	#	%	Rank	#	±
2026	21,700	5.83	5th	4 / 56	New
