= ELAM (Cyprus) =

National Popular Front Εθνικό Λαϊκό Μέτωπο
- Abbreviation: ΕΛΑΜ; ELAM
- Leader: Christos Christou
- Founded: 2008; 18 years ago
- Preceded by: Golden Dawn: Cypriot Kernel
- Headquarters: Nicosia, Cyprus
- Student wing: Student Front
- Youth wing: Youth Front ELAM
- Women's wing: Women's Front
- Ideology: Greek ultranationalism; Euroscepticism; Neo-Metaxism; Neo-Nazism; Neo-fascism
- Political position: Far-right
- European affiliation: European Conservatives and Reformists Party
- European Parliament group: European Conservatives and Reformists Group
- Greek counterpart: Golden Dawn (2008–2020)
- Colours: Black, blue and white
- House of Representatives: 8 / 56
- European Parliament: 1 / 6
- Municipal Councils: 30 / 443

Party flag

Website
- elamcy.com

The National People's Front (Greek: Εθνικό Λαϊκό Μέτωπο, ΕΛΑΜ, romanized: Ethniko Laiko Metopo, ELAM) is a Cypriot political party with a far-right ultranationalist, neo-fascist, and neo-Nazi ideology. As of May 2011, it has been approved as a legal political party.

It is listed as a terrorist organization by Northern Cyprus.

== History ==
=== 2008–2019 ===
Prior to the official formation of the National Popular Front, the organisation existed under the name "Golden Dawn: Cypriot Kernel". The kernel was established in late 2000, and was led by the current ELAM president Christos Christou, who was an active member of the Golden Dawn political party in Greece. The kernel attempted to register as a political party with the same name, but the name was rejected by the state's authorities, resulting in the use of the name "National Popular Front" as an alternative.

In 2019, the party submitted a bill seeking to impose a ban on all Muslim headgear in public spaces, including schools.

=== 2020–present ===
In 2021, ELAM played a major role in having Annita Demetriou placed as Speaker of the House of Representatives.

In June 2023, ELAM's offices in Limassol were attacked by vandals who were later arrested by Cyprus Police.

Lately, ELAM established ties to Brothers of Italy, Vox in Spain, Greek Solution and the European Conservatives and Reformists group.

In the 2024 European Parliament elections, for the first time in its history, ELAM candidate Geadis Geadi won a seat in the European Parliament whilst subsequently taking over as the 3rd largest political party from the Democratic Party (DIKO).

== Positions and ideologies ==
ELAM is a far-right, xenophobic and Eurosceptic party, strongly "enotic", which praises the Greek former prime minister Ioannis Metaxas of the 4th of August Regime.

During the COVID-19 pandemic, ELAM gained support from anti-vaccination groups for criticizing the government for their measures and the refusal of their leader to get vaccinated, even though unlike other parties they did not officially embrace conspiracy theories.

The party condemned the 2023 Hamas-led attack on Israel, noting Hamas’s close relations with Turkey. The party supports the EastMed pipeline, which would connect Cyprus with Israel.

ELAM advocated neutrality after the 2022 Russian invasion of Ukraine, highlighting Western hypocrisy on the Cyprus dispute. Since then, the party has aligned its stance more closely with Ukraine, while encouraging the EU to provide similar support to Cyprus against Turkey as it provides to Ukraine against Russia.

== Controversies ==
Ideologically, ELAM is neo-fascist, neo-nazi and nationalist-revolutionary, akin to the NPD in Germany, the GUD in France and Golden Dawn in Greece. Though the party has been accused of being aligned to fascist and even Nazi ideologies, it has categorically refused these claims and has cut ties with Golden Dawn since 2020.

=== Previous connections with Golden Dawn ===
ELAM had been openly connected with Greek far-right political party Golden Dawn, which it described in the past as a "brother movement". Members and supporters of ELAM celebrated in the streets after the Greek legislative electoral results of May 2012, which gave Golden Dawn representation in the Greek parliament for the first time. The party officially congratulated the leader of Golden Dawn, Nikolaos Michaloliakos, for their electoral success.

In late December 2012, ELAM announced its candidate Georgios Charalambous; for the upcoming presidential elections; in the presence of two notable members of Golden Dawn, Giannis Lagos and Ilias Kasidiaris. It was reported that in the presentation Ilias Kasidiaris stated that "ELAM and Golden Dawn are not simply brother parties" and that "ELAM is the Golden Dawn of Cyprus".

In October 2013 Greek Golden Dawn MPs Ilias Kasidiaris and Artemis Matheopoulos stated that ELAM is being financed by Golden Dawn. In June 2020, ELAM explained it had officially cut ties with Golden Dawn, after the party lost their parliamentary representation in the 2019 election. Its leader, Christos Christou, cited that the party was following its own strategy, acting independently. Media such as The Guardian or state-owned Turkish TRT World still describe the party as linked to Golden Dawn and as neo-Nazis. Some linked this decision to the investigations of the murder of Pavlos Fyssas and the closure of Golden Dawn in 2020 and stated that their core policies did not change.

=== ELAM and political violence ===
The party has been the subject of controversy in the Cypriot media and the broader political scene. It has been repeatedly accused of promoting racism and being involved in acts of violence. In July 2010, it was reported that after the condemnation ceremonies against the Turkish invasion of 1974 on 20 July, people with ELAM T-shirts attacked a Nigerian man in Makariou street in Nicosia. On 19 March 2011, eyewitnesses reported that members of ELAM beat up a lottery seller in Lidras street in Nicosia after a disagreement in political views. Furthermore, it was reported that eight ELAM members, one of which ranked as a second lieutenant in the Cypriot National Guard, were arrested by the police in connection to an attack against university students during the student elections of the University of Nicosia on 6 December 2011. In addition, local newspaper Haravgi reported that on 11 May 2012, a second lieutenant was found training ELAM members in shooting mortars in a National Guard's shooting ground. The Ministry of Defense confirmed that an officer had been charged for calling a non-authorized person for shooting in a shooting ground, but specified that it was a rifle shooting. The Ministry made no comment on possible political connections to the incident.

On 26 March 2014, ELAM members attempted to interrupt and stop a reunification conference in Limassol, in which one of the speakers was the Turkish Cypriot politician Mehmet Ali Talat. It was reported that members of ELAM broke through the police lines, broke a window and threw a flare in the conference hall, while a Turkish Cypriot journalist was slightly injured. ELAM was protesting against the presence of Mehmet Ali Talat in the conference, calling him a "war criminal".

ELAM has officially opposed its association with the incidents mentioned, stating that no ELAM members have been convicted for the specific crimes that its members have been accused of. It further accused the media and other organisations for intentionally connecting the movement with the incidents, in order to damage its public image.

=== Parliamentary moment of silence boycott ===
ELAM's MPs walked out on a parliamentary moment of silence for the more than 500 dead migrants from the 2023 Pylos migrant boat disaster. The party stated that the moment of silence was "political exploitation" and "The aim is so that society will feel guilty for a crime committed by traffickers."

== Electoral results ==
=== President ===
President of Cyprus
| Election | Round 1 | | | Candidate | Win |
| Election | # | % | Rank | Candidate | Win |
|---|---|---|---|---|---|
| 2013 | 3,899 | 0.88 | 4th | Georgios Charalampous | No |
| 2018 | 21,846 | 5.65 | 4th | Christos Christou | No |
| 2023 | 23,988 | 6.04 | 4th | Christos Christou | No |

=== Parliament ===
House of Representatives
| Election | Votes | | | Seats | |
| Election | # | % | Rank | # | ± |
|---|---|---|---|---|---|
| 2011 | 4,354 | 1.1 | 7th | 0 / 56 | New |
| 2016 | 13,041 | 3.7 | 8th | 2 / 56 | ▲2 |
| 2021 | 24,255 | 6.8 | 4th | 4 / 56 | ▲2 |
| 2026 | 40,567 | 10.9 | 3rd | 8 / 56 | ▲4 |

=== European Parliament ===
European Parliament
| Election | Votes | | | Seats | |
| Election | # | % | Rank | # | ± |
|---|---|---|---|---|---|
| 2009 | 663 | 0.2 | 9th | 0 / 6 | New |
| 2014 | 6,957 | 2.7 | 7th | 0 / 6 | 0 |
| 2019 | 23,167 | 8.3 | 5th | 0 / 6 | 0 |
| 2024 | 41,215 | 11.2 | 4th | 1 / 6 | ▲1 |
