= Odysseas Michaelides =

Cypriot politician (born 1968)

- Οδυσσέας Μιχαηλίδης
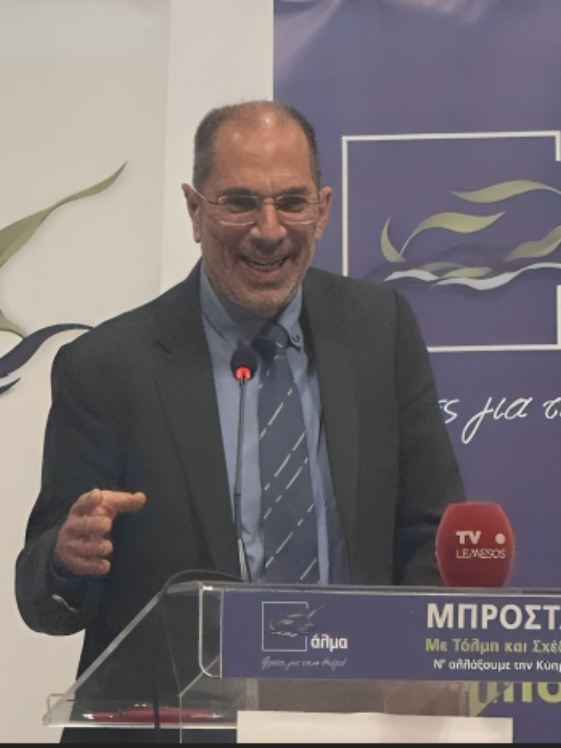
- Michaelides in 2026

Leader of ALMA – Citizens for Cyprus
- Incumbent
- Assumed office 15 October 2025

Member of the Cypriot House of Representatives
- Incumbent
- Assumed office 25 May 2026
- Constituency: Nicosia

Auditor General of Cyprus
- In office 11 April 2014 – 18 September 2024
- President: Nicos Anastasiades; Nikos Christodoulides
- Preceded by: Chrystalla Georghadji
- Succeeded by: Andreas Papakonstantinou

Personal details
- Born: 24 November 1968 (age 57)
- Party: ALMA

Odysseas Michaelides (Greek: Οδυσσέας Μιχαηλίδης; born 24 November 1968) is a Cypriot politician who serves as a member of the Cypriot House of Representatives since May 2026. Previously, he served as an auditor general from 2014 to 2024.

== Early political career ==
Months after his controversial dismissal from the position of the Auditor General, Michaelides launched ALMA, a reformist political party, stating that Cyprus "needs a restart here and now".
