= Democratic Party (Cyprus) =

Democratic Party Δημοκρατικό Κόμμα
- Abbreviation: DIKO
- Leader: Nikolas Papadopoulos
- Founder: Spyros Kyprianou
- Founded: 12 May 1976
- Split from: Eniaion
- Headquarters: Nicosia, Cyprus
- Student wing: ANAGENNISI
- Youth wing: NE DIK (Democratic Party Youth)
- Women's wing: GODIK
- Ideology: Centrism; Greek Cypriot nationalism
- Political position: Centre
- European Parliament group: Progressive Alliance of Socialists and Democrats
- International affiliation: Progressive Alliance
- Colours: Blue, Orange
- House of Representatives: 8 / 56
- European Parliament: 1 / 6
- Municipal Councils: 57 / 443

Website
- diko.org.cy
- Politics of Cyprus; Political parties; Elections; A: It has also been attributed to both centre-left and centre-right policies.

The Democratic Party (Greek: Δημοκρατικό Κόμμα (ΔΗΚΟ), Dimokratikó Kómma (DIKO)) is a centrist political party in Cyprus founded in 1976 by Spyros Kyprianou.

DIKO is variously described as centrist, centre-left or centre-right; internationally, it is a member of the Progressive Alliance, which groups together mainly centre-left parties. Among all Cypriot political parties, DIKO claims to be the most loyal follower of the policies of Archbishop Makarios, the founding father of the Republic of Cyprus.

== Overview ==
As stated in its founding declaration, the Democratic Party proposes the political philosophy of "social centrism", which constitutes "a total of attributes and values that offer in the state social cohesion, political prospect, improvement of terms of life and development of human culture, that should be shared between the entire population and not only between the privileged teams of the population". In June 2003, under the leadership of Tassos Papadopoulos, DIKO announced it was moving away from its traditional centre-right political positioning, and declared its intention of moving towards social democracy.

The party has developed a strict and hardline stance on the Cyprus problem and strongly opposed the Annan plan in 2004. DIKO also supports European integration and a non-aligned foreign policy, even though it showed support for Cyprus joining NATO's Partnership for Peace. The Movement for Social Democracy (EDEK), together with DIKO, constitute the so-called "space in-between" (ενδιάμεσος χώρος) in Cypriot politics, in that they strongly differentiate themselves from both the right-wing Democratic Rally and the left-wing AKEL.

From 2000 to 2006, the party was led by Tassos Papadopoulos, who was President of Cyprus from 2003 to 2008. Papadopoulos was succeeded as DIKO leader by Marios Garoyian, who was President of the House of Representatives from 2008 to 2011. The party leadership was taken over by Nicolas Papadopoulos, son of Tassos, following an internal ballot in December 2013.

The Democratic Party's traditional third place in legislative elections has allowed to it to assume the balance of power in parliament, where it has alternated between support for the communist Progressive Party of Working People (AKEL) and the conservative Democratic Rally (DISY). In the 2011 legislative election, the party won 15.8 percent of the vote and 9 out of 56 seats. The party's decision not to field a candidate in the 2013 presidential election and to back conservative leader Nicos Anastasiades instead was controversial amongst members, and contributed to Marios Garoyian's loss of the leadership to Nicolas Papadopoulos later in the year.

During the Seventh European Parliament, the sole DIKO MEP was attached to the Progressive Alliance of Socialists and Democrats group.

== Party leaders ==
| No. | Leader | Portrait | Term of office | | President |
|---|---|---|---|---|---|
| 1 | Spyros Kyprianou | | 1976 | 2000 | 1977–1988 |
| 2 | Tassos Papadopoulos | | 2000 | 2006 | 2003–2008 |
| 3 | Marios Garoyian | | 2006 | 2013 | |
| 4 | Nikolas Papadopoulos | | 2013 | Incumbent | |

== Election results ==
=== Parliament ===
House of Representatives
| Election | Votes | | | Seats | |
| Election | # | % | Rank | # | ± |
|---|---|---|---|---|---|
| 1976 | With AKEL and EDEK (Note: DIKO came 1st with 163,207 votes (71.2%)) | | | 21 / 35 | new |
| 1981 | 56,749 | 19.50 | 3rd | 8 / 35 | ▼13 |
| 1985 | 88,322 | 27.65 | 2nd | 16 / 56 | ▲8 |
| 1991 | 66,867 | 19.55 | 3rd | 11 / 56 | ▼5 |
| 1996 | 60,726 | 16.43 | 3rd | 10 / 56 | ▼1 |
| 2001 | 60,977 | 14.84 | 3rd | 9 / 56 | ▼1 |
| 2006 | 75,429 | 17.92 | 3rd | 11 / 56 | ▲2 |
| 2011 | 63,763 | 15.76 | 3rd | 9 / 56 | ▼2 |
| 2016 | 50,922 | 14.49 | 3rd | 9 / 56 | 0 |
| 2021 | 40,395 | 11.29 | 3rd | 9 / 56 | 0 |
| 2026 | 37,222 | 10.0 | 4th | 8 / 56 | ▼1 |

=== European Parliament ===
European Parliament
| Election | Votes | | | Seats | |
| Election | # | % | Rank | # | ± |
|---|---|---|---|---|---|
| 2004 | 57.121 | 17.09 | 3rd | 1 / 6 | new |
| 2009 | 37,625 | 12.28 | 3rd | 1 / 6 | 0 |
| 2014 | 28,044 | 10.83 | 3rd | 1 / 6 | 0 |
| 2019 | 38,756 | 13.80 | 3rd | 1 / 6 | 0 |
| 2024 | 35,815 | 9.72 | 5th | 1 / 6 | 0 |
