= House of Representatives (Cyprus) =

Unicameral legislature of Cyprus

Coordinates: 35.1722°N 33.3546°E

House of Representatives Βουλή των Αντιπροσώπων (Greek) Temsilciler Meclisi (Turkish)
- Logo of the House of Representatives

Type
- Type: Unicameral

History
- Founded: 1960

Leadership
- President: Annita Demetriou, DISY since 10 June 2021

Structure
- Seats: 56 (De facto) (Note: De jure 80 seats, as 30% of seats are allocated to Turkish Cypriots. However, these seats have been vacant since 1964.)
- Political groups: Government (8): DIKO (8); Opposition (48): DISY (17); AKEL (15); ELAM (8); ALMA (4); ADK (4)

Elections
- Voting system: Open list proportional representation
- First election: 31 July 1960
- Last election: 24 May 2026
- Next election: By 2031

Meeting place
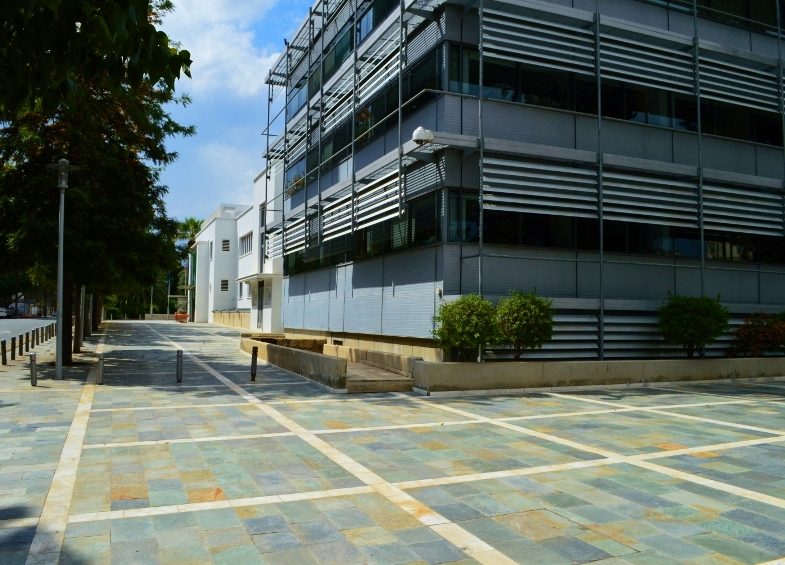
- House of Representatives, 1402 Nicosia; Republic of Cyprus

Website
- www.parliament.cy

The House of Representatives (Greek: Βουλή των Αντιπροσώπων Voulī́ tōn Antiprosṓpōn; Turkish: Temsilciler Meclisi) is the national unicameral legislature of the Republic of Cyprus. Members and three observers representing Armenian, Latin, and Maronite Cypriots are elected by proportional representation every five years. 30% of seats are allocated to Turkish Cypriots, but these have been vacant since 1964. The House of Representatives of Cyprus is the only legislature in the European Union within a fully presidential system.

== Elections ==
A general election must be held on the second Sunday of the month immediately preceding the month in which the term of office of the outgoing House expires. The outgoing House continues in office until the newly elected House assumes office, but during this time the outgoing House does not have the power to make any laws or to take any decision on any matter, except in urgent and exceptional unforeseen circumstances.

The House may dissolve itself by its own decision before its term of office expires. When it so decides, it must also specify the date of the general elections which must not be less than 30 or more than 40 days from the date of such decision. In the event of the House dissolving itself it must also specify the date for the first meeting of the newly elected House, which must not be later than fifteen days after the general elections.

== Composition ==
=== Communities ===
According to article 62(1) of the Constitution the number of representatives is 50. Out of this number 35 are elected by the Greek Cypriot Community and 15 by the Turkish Cypriot Community. However, since 1964, Turkish Cypriot members have not attended the House, and no elections have been held among the Turkish Cypriot community in accordance with the Republic's constitution. Despite this anomaly, the House has kept vacant the seats allocated to the Turkish Cypriot community. These seats remain at the disposal of Turkish Cypriot Deputies should they be elected according to the constitutional provisions.

However, for the smooth running of the House of Representatives and of the Committees in particular, the House decided in July 1985 by adopting law 124, to increase the seats to 80. Of these 56 (70%) representatives are elected by the Greek Cypriot Community and 24 (30%) by the Turkish Cypriot Community, as provided in article 62(2) of the Constitution. The decision was dictated by events because of the broadening of the activities of the House and its participation in many international parliamentary organisations; the number of 50 Representatives was not enough for the unhindered functioning of the legislative body and particularly the functioning of the parliamentary committees.

=== Seats by District ===
The current electoral law provides for a simple proportional representation system. The number of seats in each constituency is determined by law with constituencies coinciding with administrative districts. Seat allocation for the Greek Cypriot community are as follows:

Districts	Seats
Nicosia	19
Limassol	12
Famagusta	11
Larnaca	6
Paphos	5
Kyrenia	3
	Total: 56

== History ==
The first parliamentary elections were held on 31 July 1960 and the elections for the Communal Chambers on 7 August 1960. They were conducted on the basis of the colonial legislation and in accordance with the majority electoral system. The Constitution stipulated that there should be fifty Representatives, thirty-five Greek (70%), elected by the Greek community, and fifteen Turkish (30%), elected by the Turkish community. The smooth functioning of the newly established House of Representatives was however impeded from the very beginning, due to the weaknesses of the Constitution.

The Constitution of the Republic of Cyprus was a given one, worked out by a composite constitutional committee. Though it safeguards the fundamental freedoms and rights of the citizens, at the same time it comprises divisive elements that from the very outset acted as an impediment to the smooth course and development of the State. That happened for the parliament where the constitution provided the requirement for separate majorities of the Greek and Turkish Cypriot Representatives for any amendment of the electoral law and the adoption of legislation pertaining to the municipalities and the imposition of duties or taxes. Thus, a small number of Turkish Cypriot Representatives had the ability to block decisions pertaining to these matters.

In 1961 the Turkish Cypriot Representatives, making use of this right, voted against the bill for the extension of the taxation law and, subsequently, against the Income Tax Bill, leaving the Republic without pertinent income tax legislation for four years.

Following intercommunal violence, which occurred in December 1963, the fifteen Turkish Cypriot Representatives withdrew from the House and their seats remain vacant to this day. All Turkish Cypriots holding state offices or posts in the civil service also withdrew.

In its subsequent terms of office, the House of Representatives assumed the additional task of collaborating with the executive authority, in order to enact special legislation for the equitable distribution of the burdens emanating from the Turkish invasion and occupation, as well as to take other legislative measures aiming at the island's economic recovery and the relief of the missing persons’ families and those persons displaced or adversely affected. Ever since it is actively involved, both at local and international levels, in the struggle of the people of Cyprus for a just and viable settlement in the Cyprus dispute.

== Last election results ==
The centre-right Democratic Rally retained 17 seats, and the communist Progressive Party of Working People received 15 seats, both the same as in the previous election. The far-right ELAM received eight seats, four more than before and making them the joint-third largest party. The Democratic Party also won eight seats, down one from 2021. ALMA and Direct Democracy Cyprus entered the legislature for the first time, with both parties gaining four seats.

The EDEK Socialist Party, Democratic Alignment, and the Movement of Ecologists lost all their seats (a total of 11 between them). The Active Citizens Movement, the Democratic National Movement, and Volt Cyprus did not reach the minimum 3.6% threshold to gain a seat. The turnout of the election was 66.91%, an increase of 1.19 percentage points from the previous election.

Party	Votes	%	Seats	+/–
Democratic Rally	101,013	27.15	17	0
Progressive Party of Working People	88,777	23.86	15	0
National People's Front	40,567	10.90	8	+4
Democratic Party	37,222	10.00	8	–1
ALMA – Citizens for Cyprus	21,700	5.83	4	New
Direct Democracy Cyprus	20,159	5.42	4	New
EDEK Socialist Party	12,099	3.25	0	–4
Active Citizens – Movement of Cypriot United Hunters	11,890	3.20	0	0
Democratic Alignment	11,693	3.14	0	–4
Volt Cyprus	11,487	3.09	0	New
Movement of Ecologists – Citizens' Cooperation	7,264	1.95	0	–3
Democratic National Movement	2,628	0.71	0	New
Stand Up	1,897	0.51	0	New
Agronómos Agricultural Labour Party	1,044	0.28	0	New
Democratic Change	1,020	0.27	0	New
Green Party of Cyprus	509	0.14	0	New
Patriotic Front "Lacedaemonians"	494	0.13	0	New
Far-Left Resistance Communism	39	0.01	0	New
People's Struggle for Freedom	33	0.01	0	New
Independents	525	0.14	0	0
Total	372,060	100.00	56	0
Valid votes	372,060	97.69		
Invalid votes	6,621	1.74		
Blank votes	2,170	0.57		
Total votes	380,851	100.00		
Registered voters/turnout	569,182	66.91		
Source: Central Elections Service

=== Distribution by constituency ===
Constituency	DISY		AKEL		ELAM		DIKO		ALMA		ADK	
Constituency	%	S	%	S	%	S	%	S	%	S	%	S
Nicosia	27.1	5	21.7	5	10.5	3	7.9	3	7.8	2	5.4	1
Limassol	25.3	4	21.7	3	10.7	2	10.7	1	6.3	1	6.9	1
Famagusta	28.5	3	26.5	3	13.5	2	7.9	1	3.9	1	5.1	1
Larnaca	26.6	2	29.4	2	10.8	1	14.0	1	3.6	0	5.1	0
Paphos	29.5	2	22.1	1	7.8	0	16.8	1	4.1	0	3.3	1
Kyrenia	26.3	1	27.8	1	9.1	0	10.3	1	6.2	0	5.2	0
Total	27.1	17	23.9	15	10.9	8	10.0	8	5.8	4	5.4	4

== Presidents of the House of Representatives ==
The President of the House is Greek Cypriot and is elected by the Representatives elected by the Greek Cypriot community. The vice-president is constitutionally provided for to be Turkish Cypriot and is elected by the Representatives of the Turkish Cypriot community. In case of temporary absence of the President or vice-president of the House, their functions are performed by the eldest Representative of the respective community unless the Representatives of that community decide otherwise. Currently, the President of the House is Annita Demetriou.

The following people have been Presidents of the House

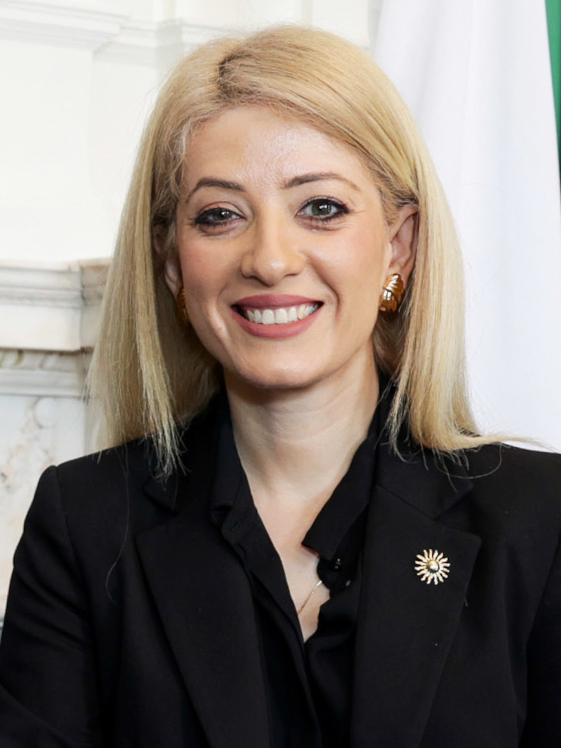
Current President of the House of Representatives, Annita Demetriou

- Glafkos Clerides: August 16, 1960 – July 22, 1976
- Tassos Papadopoulos: July 22, 1976 – September 20, 1976
- Spyros Kyprianou: September 20, 1976 – September 3, 1977
- Alekos Michaelides: September 22, 1977 – June 4, 1981
- Georgios Ladas: June 4, 1981 – December 30, 1985
- Vassos Lyssarides: December 30, 1985 – May 30, 1991
- Alexis Galanos: May 30, 1991 – June 6, 1996
- Spyros Kyprianou: June 6, 1996 – June 7, 2001
- Demetris Christofias: June 7, 2001 – February 28, 2008
- Marios Karoyian: March 6, 2008 – June 2, 2011
- Yiannakis Omirou: June 2, 2011 – June 2, 2016
- Demetris Syllouris: June 2, 2016 – October 15, 2020
- Adamos Adamou: October 15, 2020 – June 10, 2021
- Annita Demetriou: June 10, 2021 – present

== Members ==
- List of members of the parliament of Cyprus, 1981–1985
- List of members of the parliament of Cyprus, 1985–1991
- List of members of the parliament of Cyprus, 1991–1996
- List of members of the parliament of Cyprus, 2001–2006
- List of members of the parliament of Cyprus, 2006–2011
- List of members of the parliament of Cyprus, 2011–2016
- List of members of the parliament of Cyprus, 2016–2021
- List of members of the parliament of Cyprus, 2021–2026
- List of members of the parliament of Cyprus, 2026–2031

== See also ==
- Politics of Cyprus
- List of legislatures by country
