= Civil Society Dialogue Project =

- Establishment of UN peace force in Cyprus: 1964
- UNSC resolution 355: 1974
- Annan Plan for Cyprus (UNSC resolution 1250, referendums): 1999-2004
- 2008–2012 talks: 2008-2012
- 2014 talks: 2014
- 2015–2017 talks: 2015–2017

The Civil Society Dialogue Project followed the negative outcome of the referendum in Cyprus for the re-unification of the island (known as the Annan Plan), which took place on the 24 April 2004. A number of Cypriot peace pioneers launched the Civil Society Dialogue Project aiming to provide opportunities for disengaged peace builders to assume new initiatives. They have used the Structured Dialogic Design process as described by one of the fathers of the science, Dr. Aleco Christakis in his book. The project engaged more than 300 Cypriots from both sides of the Green line in structured dialogues. The first dialogue explored the obstacles which peace builders faced in their work. The participants developed a shared understanding of factors contributing to the perceived widening of the gap between the two divided communities in Cyprus. They came up with 121 ideas, which were structured using the science of dialogic design to highlight the five most influential: Media as puppets of political parties; The personal and financial interests of politicians and ordinary people on both sides; Leaders on each side do not want to share power; Disempowerment of the NGOs in north Cyprus and weak NGOs in the south who are suppressed; Provocative statements made by the leaders on both sides.

The second series of dialogues focused on developing options for the future. Out of the 84 ideas originally produced, five turned out to be the root drivers: Make possible for Turkish Cypriots to use rights arising from the Cyprus constitution and European Union membership; Have more positive and independent media on both sides; Promote modern diplomacy methods by making zero-sum VS win-win concepts widely known; Adopt the Turkish language as a working language of the Republic of Cyprus; Teach Turkish and Greek as obligatory second languages in schools.

The third series of dialogues attempted to develop a vision for economic integration, identify challenges, and explore options for actions. The key vision statements were: Involvement in common economic interests will lead to development of better social dialogue; Cooperation will provide greater understanding, generating greater confidence in relationships; Economic parity will remove obstacles to unification, especially fears of GCs that they will have to bear the financial burden and fears of TCs that they will be absorbed by the economically stronger GCs. The key challenge turned out to be: “The fact that the deep state of Turkey does not wish the TC to economically integrate with the GC community and with the EU; they want TCs to be solely dependent on Turkey”. Other challenges included, “Turkey will not accept surrendering the control of ports to the EU, since this would hamper the movement of the Turkish army”; “Lack of trust from politicians and responsible bodies"; “Most of the political elite in both communities, who do not know how to survive without the Cyprus problem, will try to block the way for economic integration on the island so that a long-term solution cannot be found”; and “Fear of being economically absorbed by the richer GC economy on the TC side”.

Other dialogues included challenges related to the opening of the enclaved city of Famagusta and protecting the environment. The results of all peoples' dialogues were handed over to Track I (politicians and diplomats) in the expectation that they would facilitate the negotiation process.
