= List of Middle East peace proposals =

This is a reversed chronological list of peace proposals in the Middle East, often abbreviated under the Mideast peace concept.

== Egyptian Crisis reconciliation ==
- Egyptian constitutional referendum, 2012
- Egyptian constitutional referendum, 2014

== Syrian Civil War peace process ==
- Arab League peace plan
  - Arab League observers mission December 2011–January 2012
- Russian resolution proposal on Syrian uprising
- Kofi Annan Syrian peace plan February–August 2012
  - United Nations Supervision Mission in Syria
- Lakhdar Brahimi Syrian peace plan – since August 17, 2012
- U.S.–Russia peace proposals on Syria – May 2013 proposal to organise a peace conference
  - Geneva II Conference on Syria – January 2014
- 2015 Zabadani cease-fire agreement – between Syrian Opposition and Assad Government
- Vienna peace talks for Syria
- Four committees initiative
- Geneva III
- Geneva IV

== Yemeni Crisis reconciliation ==
- Yemeni crisis reconciliation attempts
- Yemeni presidential election, 2012

== Fatah–Hamas reconciliation talks ==
- Fatah–Hamas Mecca Agreement (2007)
- 2011 Cairo accords (2011)
- Fatah–Hamas Doha Agreement (2012)
- May 2012 Cairo agreement
- 2014 Fatah–Hamas Gaza Agreement
- 2017 Fatah–Hamas Agreement

== Iran nuclear talks ==
- P5+1, 2006 diplomatic efforts
- Iran nuclear deal framework
- Joint Plan of Action (2013)
- Joint Comprehensive Plan of Action (2015)
- February 2019 Warsaw Conference

== Iraq War peace proposals ==
- United Nations Security Council Resolution 1441
- Failed Iraqi peace initiatives
- Blair's tests for Iraq disarmament

== Gulf War peace initiatives ==
- Geneva Peace Conference (1991)
- United Nations Security Council Resolution 687 – April 1991
- United Nations Security Council Resolution 1154 – 1998

== Turkish–Kurdish conflict negotiations ==
- Turkey–PKK peace talks (1999–2004, unsuccessful)
- Solution process (2012–2015, failed)

== Internal Lebanese reconciliation ==
- 17 May Agreement – during the Lebanese civil war
- Tripartite Accord (Lebanon) – 1985 agreement to end the Lebanese civil war
- Taif Agreement – Lebanese civil war peace accords
- Doha Agreement – 2008 Lebanese reconciliation agreement, following 2007–2008 crisis

== Cyprus conflict pacification attempts ==
- Establishment of UN peace force in Cyprus (1964)
- UNSC resolution 355 (1974)
- Annan reunification plan for Cyprus
  - United Nations Security Council Resolution 1250 (1999)
  - Cypriot Annan Plan referendums, 2004
- 2008–2012 Cyprus talks
- 2014 Cyprus talks
- 2015–2017 Cyprus talks

== Iraqi–Kurdish conflict peace negotiations ==
- Kurdish Civil War peace accords (finalized in 1997)
- 1975 Algiers Agreement
- Kurdish–Iraqi peace talks (1970–1974, unsuccessful)
- Recognition of Kurdish Government by Iraq

== Arab–Israeli peace diplomacy and treaties ==
=== Arab League–Israel accords ===
- Balfour Declaration (1917)
- Peace proposals of Count Folke Bernadotte (1948)
- 1949 Armistice Agreements
- Lausanne Conference of 1949
- UN Security Council Resolution 242 (November 22, 1967)
- Jarring Mission (1967–1971)
- Allon Plan (July 26, 1967)
- Rogers Plan (1969)
- Camp David Accords (1978)
- Egypt–Israel peace treaty (1979)
- Fahd Plan (1981)
- Reagan peace plan (September 1, 1982)
- Fez Initiative (September 9, 1982)
- May 17 Agreement, a failed attempt of peace between Lebanon and Israel (1983)
- Israel–Jordan peace treaty (1994)
- Arab Peace Initiative (March 28, 2002)
- Abraham Accords (2020)
- Israel–Sudan normalization agreement (2020)

=== Israeli–Palestinian peace process ===
- Madrid Conference of 1991
- Oslo Accords (1993)
- Wye River Memorandum (October 23, 1998)
- Camp David 2000 Summit (2000)
- The Clinton Parameters (December 23, 2000)
- Taba summit (January, 2001)
- Arab Peace Initiative (March, 2002)
- Elon Peace Plan (also known as "The Israel Initiative") (2002)
- The People's Voice (July 27, 2002)
- Road Map for Peace (April 30, 2003)
- Geneva Accord (October 20, 2003)
- Sharm el-Sheikh Summit of 2005 (February 8, 2005)
- 2006 Franco-Italian-Spanish Middle East Peace Plan
- Isratin proposal (a one-state solution by Muammar Gathafi) (May 8, 2003)
- Israeli Peace Initiative (April 6, 2011)
- John Kerry Parameters (December 28, 2016)
- Trump peace plan (January 28, 2020)
- Gaza peace plan (September 29, 2025)

== Turkish War of Independence peace treaties ==
- Treaty of Alexandropol 1920
- Cilicia Peace Treaty 1921
- Treaty of Moscow (1921)
- Treaty of Kars 1921
- Treaty of Ankara (1921)
- Conference of London 1921–22
- Treaty of Lausanne (1923)
- Armistice of Mudanya 1922

== WWI and post-war accords ==
- Sykes–Picot Agreement 1916
- McMahon–Hussein Correspondence 1916
- Treaty of Sèvres 1920
- Paris Peace Conference, 1919
- Faisal–Weizmann Agreement (1919)

== Saudi-related peace treaties ==
- Uqair Protocol of 1922

== See also ==
- Strategic reset
- UN General Assembly Resolution 3379
