= Cyprus peace process =

Cyprus peace negotiations

- Establishment of UN peace force in Cyprus: 1964
- UNSC resolution 355: 1974
- Annan Plan for Cyprus (UNSC resolution 1250, referendums): 1999-2004
- 2008–2012 talks: 2008-2012
- 2014 talks: 2014
- 2015–2017 talks: 2015–2017

The Cyprus peace process refers to negotiations and plans aimed at resolving the Cyprus Problem.

== History ==
The peace efforts had begun around the time of the 1974 Turkish invasion of Cyprus, which split the multiethnic Republic of Cyprus into the Turkish-majority north and the Greek-majority south. The north later declared independence as the Turkish Republic of Northern Cyprus, although Turkey is the only United Nations (UN) member to recognise this. A ceasefire has been in place ever since, but a permanent solution has not been agreed to, and UN peacekeepers still operate a buffer zone between the two regions.

== Approaches ==
There are two major approaches to resolve the Cyprus dispute: the reunification of Cyprus into a single state (as attempted in the Annan plan) and the two-state solution, which would legalise the current status quo. The majority of the international community supports the reunification of Cyprus into a single state, as does the Republic of Cyprus.

== Cyprus conflict resolution attempts ==
- Establishment of UN peace force in Cyprus (1964)
- UNSC resolution 355 (1974)
- Annan reunification plan for Cyprus
  - United Nations Security Council Resolution 1250 (1999)
  - Cypriot Annan Plan referendums, 2004
- 2008–2012 Cyprus talks
- 2014 Cyprus talks
- 2015–2017 Cyprus talks

== See also ==
- Embargo against Northern Cyprus
- List of Middle East peace proposals
- List of United Nations Security Council resolutions concerning Cyprus
