= Two-state solution (Cyprus) =

Proposed diplomatic solution for the Cyprus dispute

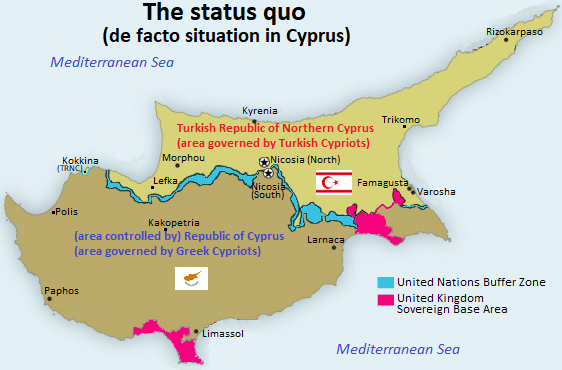
The current situation in Cyprus

The two-state solution for the Cyprus dispute refers to the proposed permanent division of the island of Cyprus into a Turkish Cypriot State in the north and a Greek Cypriot State in the south, as opposed to the various proposals for reunification that have been suggested since the island was split into two by the 1974 Turkish invasion. The two-state solution would entail the legalisation of the status quo, where Greek Cypriots govern the southern part of the island and Turkish Cypriots govern the northern part, the latter of which is currently not recognised by any country other than Turkey.

Recognizing the Turkish Republic of Northern Cyprus as a separate state, as required by a two-state solution, has been firmly refused by both the United Nations and the European Union. This refusal is grounded in the principles of maintaining territorial integrity and sovereignty as per international law and UN resolutions. The European Union has stated that it will "never, ever" accept a two-state solution for Cyprus.

On 14 December 2019, Foreign Minister of Northern Cyprus Kudret Özersay said a two-state solution to the issue was "close to hand". On 23 February 2020, Ersin Tatar, who was then the prime minister of Northern Cyprus and was elected its president eight months later, said that "a forced marriage cannot be successful". He elaborated, "We are different, we speak Turkish and they speak Greek. We are Muslims and they are Christians. The new generation does not know each other at all. A child who was 10 in 1974 is now 55, he has grandchildren. We are separated."

== ICJ's 2010-Kosovo decision and its reflections on the two-state solution ==
United Nations' International Court of Justice decided in 2010 that "International law contains no prohibition on declarations of independence".

The International Court of Justice (ICJ)'s 2010 Kosovo decision, which stated that international law does not prohibit declarations of independence, does not translate to a similar acceptance in the Cyprus context. The ICJ clarified that the legality of such declarations often depends on whether they are associated with unlawful use of force or other egregious violations of international law.

The International Court of Justice (ICJ), without specifying whether it agrees or not with the determination of some of the relevant UNSC resolutions, declared in 2010 that

81. Several participants have invoked resolutions of the Security Council condemning particular declarations of independence: see, inter alia, Security Council resolutions 216 (1965) and 217 (1965), concerning Southern Rhodesia: Security Council resolution 541 (1983), concerning northern Cyprus; and Security Council resolution 787 (1992), concerning the Republika Srpska.

The Court notes, however, that in all of those instances the Security Council was making a determination as regards the concrete situation existing at the time that those declarations of independence were made; the illegality attached to the declarations of independence thus stemmed not from the unilateral character of these declarations as such, but from the fact that they were, or would have been, connected with the unlawful use of force or other egregious violations of norms of general international law, in particular those of a peremptory character (jus cogens). In the context of Kosovo, the Security Council has never taken this position. The exceptional character of the resolutions enumerated above appears to the Court to confirm that no general prohibition against unilateral declarations of independence may be inferred from the practice of the Security Council.

Oral Observations of Harold Hongju Koh on behalf of the United States of America, rejected the argument of the Cyprus against the "legality of the unilateral declaration of independence" of Kosovo:

When Cyprus pointedly sought to analogize the 1244 process to the heart-wrenching, but misleading, case where a parent sends a small child off to state supervision, only to lose her forever, I argued that upon reflection, the far better analogy would be to acknowledge the futility of the state forcing an adult child to return to an abusive home against her will, particularly where parent and child have already long lived apart, and where repeated efforts at reconciliation have reached impasse. There, as here, declaring independence would be the only viable option, and would certainly be in accordance with law.

On 9 October 2014, United States District Judge Paul L. Friedman of the District Court for the District of Columbia qualified the TRNC as "democratic republic with a president, prime minister, legislature and judiciary". Judge Antônio Augusto Cançado Trindade made a statement in ICJ's Kosovo decision that

66. This leads us to consider a key aspect which was insufficiently singled out in the past, despite its great relevance, and which remains, in my view, of considerable importance in the present, namely, the aforementioned conditions of living of the population. People and territory go together, but the emphasis is shifted from the status of territory to the needs and aspirations of people...228...it would not be necessary to indulge into semantics of what constitutes a “people” either. This is a point which has admittedly been defying international legal doctrine to date. In the context of the present subject-matter, it has been pointed out, for example, that terms such as “Kosovo population”, “people of Kosovo”, “all people in Kosovo”, “all inhabitants in Kosovo”, appear indistinctly in Security Council resolution 1244 (1999) itself. There is in fact no terminological precision as to what constitutes a “people” in international law ((It has been argued, for example, that, for a human collectivity or a group to constitute a “people” for eligibility to statehood, it would need: a) sharing of common background of ethnicity, language, religion, history and cultural heritage; b) territorial integrity of the area claimed; c) the subjective element of the group’s self-conscious perception as a distinct “people”, able to form a viable political entity; for the view that the Kosovars meet these requirements and constitute a “people”, and, moreover, their right to internal self-determination was not respected by Milosevic-led Serbia, cf., e.g., M. Sterio, “The Kosovar Declaration of Independence: ‘Botching the Balkans’ or Respecting International Law?”, 37 Georgia Journal of International and Comparative Law (2008-2009) pp. 277 and 287.)), despite the large experience on the matter. What is clear to me is that, for its configuration, there is conjugation of factors, of an objective as well as subjective character, such as traditions and culture, ethnicity, historical ties and heritage, language, religion, sense of identity or kinship, the will to constitute a people [Answers by The Netherlands, para. 16, and Albania. paras. 20-21]; these are all factual, not legal, elements, which usually overlap each other [Answer by Finland, p. 3]...229. It may be recalled that the UNMIK Constitutional Framework for Kosovo (2001) itself, clarifying the U.N. approach to matter at issue, pointed out that Kosovo is “an entity” which, “with its people, has unique historical, legal, cultural and linguistic attributes”. To these elements I would add yet another one, - and a significant one, - namely, that of common suffering: common suffering creates a strong sense of identity.

== Relevant Court Cases ==
International law contains no prohibition on declarations of independence, and the recognition of a country is a political issue.

=== UNSC Resolution 1983/541 is Non-Binding ===
On 04.08.1986, Greece filed a case against the Council of the European Communities (supporter intervener:Commission of the European Communities). In the case, Greece first argued that the UN Security Council Resolution 1983/541 called "upon all States not to recognize any Cypriot State other than the Republic of Cyprus". Greece then reasoned that since the Turkish Government recognized the Turkish Republic of Northern Cyprus, the European Community "cannot grant it the special aid without ignoring that breach and thereby itself violating an obligation imposed on it under a measure which is binding on it by virtue of the principle of substitution."

On 25.05.1988, Council of the European Communities(supporter intervener:Commission of the European Communities) specified that the UN Security Council Resolution 1983/541 which is not passed under Article VII of the UN Charter is non-binding in nature, and Council of EC and the Commission of the EC stated that "It is manifest from the wording of the operative part and from the debates and the declarations of vote prior to the adoption of Resolution No 541 that the Resolution does not constitute a "decision" and is therefore not a binding measure, but a measure in the nature of a mere recommendation. Consequently, the States to which the declaration is addressed are NOT bound to comply with paragraph 7 of the resolution or to infer from the fact that paragraph 7 was not complied with the consequences which Greece claims they should infer."

On 27.09.1988, European Court of Justice (ECJ) rejected all of the Greece's arguments in the Case 204/86 (Greek Republic v. Council of the European Communities(supporter intervener:Commission of the European Communities)), and punished Greece to pay all the costs, including the costs of the intervener. ECJ stated (in prg28) that the Resolution 1983/541 of the United Nations Security Council is completely extraneous to relations between the Community and Turkey.

=== International Courts ===
- No prohibition of declarations of independence in international law: On 22 July 2010, The International Court of Justice (ICJ) stated in its advisory opinion on Kosovo's declaration of independence in 2010 that "the Security Council in an exceptional character attached illegality to the DOI of TRNC because it was, or would have been connected with the unlawful use of force" and "general international law contains no applicable prohibition of declarations of independence".

The ICJ's opinion was expected to bolster demands for recognition by Northern Cyprus. The decision of the ICJ has also been regarded as opening more potential options for the TRNC to gain international legitimacy.

- Legality of the acts of the TRNC's authorities: On 2 July 2013, The European Court of Human Rights (ECtHR) decided that "...notwithstanding the lack of international recognition of the regime in the northern area, a de facto recognition of its acts may be rendered necessary for practical purposes. Thus the adoption by the authorities of the "TRNC" of civil, administrative or criminal law measures, and their application or enforcement within that territory, may be regarded as having a legal basis in domestic law for the purposes of the Convention".
- The legality of the arrest of Greek Cypriots by the TRNC police; The legality of pre-trial detention and post-conviction imprisonment by the TRNC Authorities; The legality of the criminal proceedings conducted by the TRNC Courts: European Court of Human Rights (ECtHR) (23.02.2016; Application no. 11138/10; CASE OF MOZER v. The Republic of Moldova and Russia): "140. In several judgments concerning Turkey, the Court has applied the principles established in Cyprus v. Turkey to criminal matters (see Foka, cited above, § 83, where the arrest of the Greek-Cypriot applicant by a "TRNC" police officer was found to be lawful for the purpose of Article 5; Protopapa, cited above, § 60, where both the pre-trial detention and the detention after conviction imposed by the "TRNC" Authorities were considered to be lawful for the purpose of Article 5 and a criminal trial before a "TRNC" Court was found to be in accordance with Article 6; and also Asproftas v. Turkey, no. 16079/90, § 72, 27 May 2010; Petrakidou v. Turkey, no. 16081/90, § 71, 27 May 2010; and Union européenne des droits de l’homme and Josephides v. Turkey (dec.), no. 7116/10, § 9, 2 April 2013)."
- The legality, independence, and impartiality of the TRNC's courts: On 2 September 2015, The European Court of Human Rights (ECtHR) decided that "...the court system set up in the "TRNC" was to be considered to have been "established by law" with reference to the "constitutional and legal basis" on which it operated, and it has not accepted the allegation that the "TRNC" courts as a whole lacked independence and/or impartiality".
- The difference of TRNC than Transnistria, Abkhazia, and Crimea: On 25 June 2024, The European Court of Human Rights (ECtHR) [Ukraine v. Russia Case (Crimea); Applications 20958/14 and 38334/18] explained the reasons for the legality of the actions of TRNC laws in the north of Cyprus under the ECtHR framework (Why the situation of the TRNC differs from that of Crimea, Transnistria, and Abkhazia):

930. Whereas the Court held that "TRNC Domestic Law" was based on the Anglo-Saxon legal tradition and was therefore accepted as "law" for the purposes of the Convention, in cases concerning Transdniestria (the "MRT"), the Court found "no basis for assuming that [in the 'MRT'] there is a system reflecting a judicial tradition compatible with the Convention similar to the one in the remainder of the Republic of Moldova". The Court has reached similar conclusions regarding the "law" of Abkhazia and the "lawfulness" of Abkhaz courts.

932....Moreover, while the "MRT" and Abkhaz-related cases concerned the "law" of unrecognised entities that did not reflect "a judicial tradition ... similar to the one in the remainder of the Republic of Moldova" or "to the rest of Georgia" respectively, in Cyprus v. Turkey (merits) the Court held that "The civil courts operating in the 'TRNC' were in substance based on the Anglo-Saxon tradition and were not essentially different from the courts operating before the events of 1974 and from those which existed in the southern part of Cyprus". This particular aspect makes the latter case similar, yet different from the present case. The Cyprus v. Turkey case concerned the continued application of pre-existing Cypriot law valid in the territory of the "TRNC" before Turkey had obtained actual control of that territory, whereas the present case concerns the application in Crimea of the law of the Russian Federation (or the "law" of the local authorities, as its derivative) replacing the previously applicable and valid Ukrainian law.

=== Courts of Countries ===
- The USA: On 9 October 2014, the Federal Court of the United States (USA) stated that "the TRNC purportedly operates as a democratic republic with a president, prime minister, legislature and judiciary...The TRNC is NOT vulnerable to a lawsuit in Washington.". (State immunity: The protection which a sovereign state is given from being sued in the courts of other sovereign states.)

Greek Cypriot Toumazou applied to the USA Court of Appeals. The USA Court of Appeals rejected Toumazou, too on 15.01.2016

After the US Federal Court called and qualified TRNC as "Democratic Republic" and the USA Court of Appeals affirmed the decision, The United States Sectetary of State has started to describe the TRNC as the Area Administered by Turkish Cypriots

- The UK: On 3 February 2017, The United Kingdom's High Court stated "There was no duty in the United Kingdom law upon the Government to refrain from recognizing Northern Cyprus. The United Nations itself works with Northern Cyprus law enforcement agencies and facilitates co-operation between the two parts of the island". and revealed that the co-operation between the United Kingdom police and law agencies in Northern Cyprus is legal.
- France: On 10 December 2025, The Court of Aix-En-Provence rejected the Republic of Cyprus' extradition request of a Turkish Cypriot national with the reasoning that the European law does not apply in Northern Cyprus, and the courts of the Republic of Cyprus are not in a position to enforce laws in Northern Cyprus. On 18 December 2025, The French Public Prosecutor's Office rejected the Republic of Cyprus' appeal. On 21.01.2026, France's Court of Cassation (Cour de Cassation) rejected the Republic of Cyprus' appeal.

== Support for two-state solution ==
The island of Cyprus is practically divided into two, the Republic of Cyprus in the south and the Turkish Republic of Northern Cyprus in the north.

A number of observers suggest partition is the best solution to the Cyprus dispute.

In general, Turkey has often expressed its support for the two-state solution as an alternative to reunification, most notably by Turkish President Recep Tayyip Erdogan during his visit to majority Turkish North Nicosia in 2014. According to Greek Cypriot media, the two-state solution is pushed by Turkey in case the UN-mediated peace process fails.

After the USA's Federal Court's designation of TRNC as a "democratic republic" in 2014, the U.S. Department of State has called TRNC as "The Area Administered by Turkish Cypriots".

In December 2021, the President of Northern Cyprus Ersin Tatar said that there are two separate states on the island and the Turkish Cypriot side will not accept a solution on the basis of a federation and it will not step back from the new policy of two separate states, which is fully supported by Turkey.

On 30 January 2022, Turkish Cypriot president Tatar specified that the sovereign equality and the equal international status of the Turkish Cypriots are non-negotiable.

On 11 May 2022, Ryan Murdock (Harvard International Review) stated that "The reality on the ground makes a two-state solution the only likely outcome that avoids a descent into chaos."

On 5 July 2024, the mandate of the UN Secretary General personal envoy, María Ángela Holguín, ended. Holguín found no common ground for Cyprus solution. In parting letter, Holguín called for Cypriots to "think differently" to find solution to Cyprus problem.

On 18 July 2024, the Turkish parliament passed a resolution supporting a two-state solution to the Cyprus problem.

The former leader, Jeffrey Donaldson, of The Democratic Unionist Party (DUP) in Northern Ireland supports Two-state solution in Cyprus. On 4 August 2024, the British politician Richard Balfe, Conservative member of the UK House of Lords, said that the TRNC should either become independent or unite with Turkey.

On 9 September 2024, International United Nations Watch (IUNW) think-tank stated that "Two-state solution is the only way to solve Cyprus problem".

On 15 October 2024, the UN Secretary General, António Guterres, stated that there is no common ground between Greek Cypriots and Turkish Cypriots in Cyprus for negotiations.

On 6 November 2024, Ersin Tatar, President of the Turkish Republic of Northern Cyprus, participated in The Council of Heads of State of the Organization of Turkic States (OTS) in Bishkek, Kyrgyzstan as a Guest of Honor.

On 14 October 2025, the General Assembly of the Turkish Republic of Northern Cyprus adopted the "Resolution on a Two-State Solution to the Cyprus Issue.". In the resolution, the primary objectives for the Turkish Cypriot People were outlined as follows:

To work toward the removal of the unjust political, economic, and social isolations imposed on the Turkish Republic of Northern Cyprus;

to accelerate efforts aimed at securing and promoting the international recognition of the Turkish Republic of Northern Cyprus;
and to convey to the international community that the "Two-State" settlement constitutes the foundation for a genuine and lasting peace in Cyprus island.

The Turkish Republic of Northern Cyprus Assembly, taking into account global developments and shifting balances, firmly believes that if unity and solidarity are maintained, and if close cooperation with the Motherland Turkey is achieved, the Turkish Republic of Northern Cyprus will be able to attain these goals in the near future. In this context, one of the foremost objectives is to become a full member of the Organization of Turkic States and its affiliated bodies under our constitutional name, with the support of all brotherly States. A new negotiation process can only be possible if the inherent sovereign equality and equal international status of the Turkish Cypriot People are formally recognized by the United Nations, with the aim of concluding an agreement that ensures cooperation between the two States. The Turkish Cypriot People and the Assembly of the Turkish Republic of Northern Cyprus remain, as always, faithful to the principle of "Peace at Home, Peace in the World" proclaimed by the Great Leader, Founder of the Republic of Türkiye, Gazi Mustafa Kemal Atatürk, and will continue to advance steadfastly in line with his vision that "Independence is My Character."

== Polls ==
=== 2000s ===
In 2007, the Turkish Republic of Northern Cyprus performed a poll on the topic, with 60% of Turkish Cypriots supporting the idea of the two-state solution. Another poll in 2009, made by KADEM research, showed 77.9% support among Turkish Cypriots with 63% casting doubt over the success of the peace negotiations.

In April 2009, an opinion poll conducted for the CyBC showed that the majority of Greek Cypriots supported partition.

=== 2010s ===
In a 2010 opinion poll, 84% of Greek Cypriots and 70% of Turkish Cypriots agreed with the sentiment that "the other side would never accept the actual compromises and concessions that are needed for a fair and viable settlement".

On 16 November 2019, a European Social Survey poll revealed that 13.9% of Greek Cypriots were in favor of the two-state solution, while 13.7% were neither for or against it but could tolerate it if necessary. It also showed that 18% of Greek Cypriots were in favor of keeping things the same, and that 31.2% were neither for or against it but could tolerate it if necessary. The poll concluded that 49.2% of Greek Cypriots were not against the current situation, while 27.6% were not against the two-state solution.

=== 2020s ===
According to a January 2020 poll by Gezici, the two-state solution had a support rate of 81.3% among Turkish Cypriots.

In an opinion poll conducted by Cypronetwork among Greek Cypriots on behalf of the Cyprus Broadcasting Corporation (CyBC) in 2022, 18% stated that the best solution to the Cyprus problem was two separate states; the same figure was 4% in May 2021.

In an opinion poll conducted by RetailZoom among Greek Cypriots on 14–16 October 2024 in southern Cyprus, when asked where they thought the Cyprus issue would lead, 43% said the status quo would remain, 28% favoured a "two-state solution", 2% chose the "double Enosis" option, 6% mentioned a "confederation", 13% supported a "bi-zonal, bi-communal federation", and 8% did not want to answer.

The survey conducted by the University of Cyprus in November 2026 found that a two-state solution is viewed as acceptable or tolerable by 33.3% of Greek Cypriots.

== International memberships of Northern Cyprus with its official name ==
On 11 November 2022, Northern Cyprus became an observer state of the Organisation of Turkic States (OTS) with its official name "Turkish Republic of Northern Cyprus".

On 29 April 2023, Northern Cyprus became an observer member of the Parliamentary Assembly of Turkic States (TURKPA) with its official name "Turkish Republic of Northern Cyprus".

== Opposition to two-state solution ==
The concept of a two-state solution for the Cyprus dispute, suggesting a permanent division of the island into a Turkish Cypriot State in the north and a Greek Cypriot State in the south, faces significant opposition grounded in international law, potential impact on international politics, and the precedents it might set for similar conflicts worldwide. Some rejected these opposing views by supplying the relevant sources for the counter arguments.

=== Legal and international law considerations ===
==== United Nations stance ====
The United Nations has consistently opposed the recognition of the Turkish Republic of Northern Cyprus (TRNC) as an independent state. This stance aligns with principles of maintaining territorial integrity and sovereignty, as enshrined in international law and various UN resolutions. The UN's focus has been on reunification based on a federal model, exemplified by initiatives like the Annan Plan, despite its rejection by Greek Cypriots in 2004.

==== European Union's position ====
The European Union has made it clear that it will "never, ever" accept a two-state solution for Cyprus. This position is in line with the EU's commitment to supporting the sovereignty and territorial integrity of its member states, including the Republic of Cyprus.

=== Impact on international politics and global precedents ===
A two-state resolution in Cyprus might embolden separatist movements and unrecognized states worldwide, potentially leading to increased instability and conflicts. This prospect raises concerns about the erosion of international norms regarding sovereignty and territorial integrity.

On 25 June 2024, The European Court of Human Rights (ECtHR) [Ukraine v. Russia Case (Crimea); Applications 20958/14 and 38334/18] explained the reasons for the legality of the actions of TRNC laws in the north of Cyprus under the ECtHR framework (Why the situation of the TRNC differs from that of Crimea, Transnistria, and Abkhazia) (prg930 and prg932) (see above)

== See also ==
- 2015–2017 Cyprus talks
- Taksim (politics)
- Embargo against Northern Cyprus
- 2004 Cypriot Annan Plan referendums § Results
