= 2006 French–Italian–Spanish Middle East peace plan =

Proposed Arab–Israeli peace plan

On November 16, 2006, France, Italy and Spain announced a new Middle East peace plan proposed by Spanish Premier José Luis Rodríguez Zapatero during talks with French president Jacques Chirac. Later on, the plan was introduced to Romano Prodi, Italy's prime minister who gave his full support to the plan. The peace move came after Israel invaded the Gaza Strip in Operation Autumn Clouds.

== Plan ==
The plan is a five-point blueprint for peace between the Israelis and Palestinians. The plan calls for:

- an immediate ceasefire,
- an exchange of prisoners,
- an international peace conference (similar to the Madrid Conference of 1991, which was held by Spain and led to the Oslo Accords), while it also
- backs a prospective Palestinian unity government, and
- an international mission in the Gaza Strip to monitor the ceasefire.

== Reaction ==
Senior Palestinian National Authority negotiator Saeb Erekat welcomed the plan in principle, but added that there was no need for a new initiative, but rather that it could serve as a realistic political track to a two-state solution. An Israeli official said parts of the plan were being discussed, but that it was not being taken seriously as it was not coordinated with the EU or Israel. Israel supports direct negotiations over an international conference.

== See also ==
- Gaza–Israel conflict
- List of Middle East peace proposals
