= Turkish Cypriot State =

Proposed Turkish state in Cyprus

Map of Northern Cyprus (shown in red)

In order to find a solution to the Cyprus dispute, which started in 1963, numerous plans and meetings in international arena were organized and eventually United Nations determined the solution to be "bi-zonal and bi-communal federation" based on the political equality of Greek Cypriot and Turkish Cypriot people. According to United Nations' 2004 Annan Plan for the reunification of Cyprus, the proposed United Republic of Cyprus would consist of two constituent states, the Greek Cypriot State and Turkish Cypriot State (Turkish: Kıbrıs Türk Devleti), which would be governed by Greek Cypriots and Turkish Cypriots respectively.

== Law of necessity ==
Since the implementation of the Annan Plan was dependent on its approval by both communities, Greek-Cypriots and Turkish-Cypriots were aware before the referendum that the rejection of the United Nations' Plan by one side would make it null and void and the status quo ante in the Cyprus Island would continue. Turkish Cypriots voted for the Plan whereas Greek Cypriots rejected it. The United Nations' 2004 plan, according to its own terms, became null and void. By the rejection of the plan, the establishment of a new state of affairs in the Island and the termination of the existing situation was prevented.

Though the United Nations' plan failed, it has some consequences in favor of Turkish Cypriots and their administration via "law of necessity" according to international law. After the referendum, most of the major international organisations (EU, UN via UN SG, OIC etc.) declared support to Turkish Cypriots.

Northern Cyprus started to become member of international organizations under the name "Turkish Cypriot State". It is under this name that the Organisation of Islamic Cooperation and the Economic Cooperation Organization recognises the Turkish Republic of Northern Cyprus.

== Turkish Cypriot State in Organisation of Islamic Countries ==
In June 2004, Northern Cyprus became an observer member of the Organisation of Islamic Countries (OIC) under the name "Turkish Cypriot State". According to the OIC, the settlement to the Cyprus Dispute is based on the inherent constitutive power of the Greek Cypriot and Turkish Cypriot peoples, their political equality and co-ownership of the Cyprus Island.

== Turkish Cypriot State in Economic Cooperation Organisation ==
In October 2012, Northern Cyprus became an observer member of Economic Cooperation Organisation under the name "Turkish Cypriot State". The first meeting of ECO that Turkish Cypriot State participated as observer country is the 20th Meeting of Council of Ministers (COM) of ECO
