= 2002–2003 Iraqi pre-war diplomatic proposals =

Attempts by Iraq to prevent the 2003 invasion

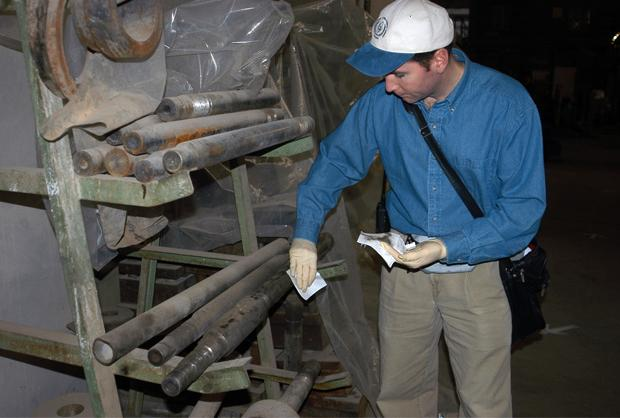
A UN weapons inspector in Iraq

Before the 2003 invasion of Iraq, the Iraqi government made several secret diplomatic attempts to avert the war.

== Saddam Hussein's attempts ==
In December 2002, a representative of the head of Iraqi Intelligence, Gen. Tahir Jalil Habbush al-Tikriti, contacted former CIA counterterrorism head Vincent Cannistraro, stating that Saddam "knew there was a campaign to link him to September 11 and prove he had weapons of mass destruction." Cannistraro further added that "the Iraqis were prepared to satisfy these concerns. I reported the conversation to senior levels of the state department and I was told to stand aside and they would handle it." Cannistraro stated that the offers made were all "killed" by the Bush administration because they allowed Saddam Hussein to remain in power – an outcome viewed as unacceptable.

Shortly after, Egyptian president Hosni Mubarak's national security advisor, Osama El-Baz, sent a message to the U.S. State Department that the Iraqis wanted to discuss the accusations that Saddam had weapons of mass destruction and ties with al-Qaeda. Iraq also attempted to reach the US through the Syrian, French, German, and Russian intelligence services. Nothing came of the attempts.

== Imad Hage ==
In January 2003, Lebanese-American Imad Hage met with Michael Maloof of the US Defense Department's Office of Special Plans. Hage, a resident of Beirut, had been recruited by the department to assist in the war on terrorism. He reported that Mohammed Nassif, a close aide to Syrian president Bashar al-Assad, had expressed frustrations about the difficulties of Syria contacting the United States, and had attempted to use him as an intermediary. Maloof arranged for Hage to meet with Richard Perle, head of the Defense Policy Board.

In February 2003, Hage met with the chief of Iraqi intelligence's foreign operations, Hassan al-Obeidi. Obeidi told Hage that Baghdad didn't understand why they were being targeted, and that they had no WMDs; he then made the offer for Washington to send in 2000 FBI agents to ascertain this. He additionally offered oil concessions, but stopped short of having Hussein give up power, instead suggesting that elections could be held in two years. Later, Obeidi suggested that Hage travel to Baghdad for talks; he accepted.

Later that month, Hage met with Gen. Habbush in addition to Iraqi Deputy Prime Minister Tariq Aziz. He was offered top priority to US firms in oil and mining rights, UN-supervised elections, US inspections (with up to 5,000 inspectors), to have al-Qaeda agent Abdul Rahman Yasin (in Iraqi custody since 1994) handed over as a sign of good faith, and to give "full support for any US plan" in the Arab-Israeli peace process. They also wished to meet with high-ranking US officials. On 19 February, Hage faxed Maloof his report of the trip. Maloof reports having brought the proposal to Jamie Duran. The Pentagon denies that either Wolfowitz or Rumsfeld, Duran's bosses, were aware of the plan.

On 21 February, Maloof informed Duran in an email that Perle wished to meet with Hage and the Iraqis if the Pentagon would clear it. Duran responded "Mike, working this. Keep this close hold.". On 7 March, Perle met with Hage in Knightsbridge, and stated that he wanted to pursue the matter further with people in Washington (both have acknowledged the meeting). A few days later, he informed Hage that Washington refused to let him meet with Habbush to discuss the offer (Hage stated that Perle's response was "that the consensus in Washington was it was a no-go"). Perle told the Times, "The message was 'Tell them that we will see them in Baghdad."

Throughout March, Hage continued to pass messages from Iraqi officials to Maloof. At one point, Maloof wrote a memo stating "Hage quoted Obeidi as saying this is the last window or channel through which this message has gone to the United States. He characterized the tone of Dr. Obeidi as begging." Maloof contacted Perle, stating that Iraqi officials are "prepared to meet with you in Beirut, and as soon as possible, concerning 'unconditional terms' ", and that "Such a meeting has Saddam Hussein's clearance." No action was taken.

According to an Arab source of the Guardian, Perle sent a Saudi official the following terms for Iraq to fulfill to prevent war: "Saddam's abdication and departure, first to a US military base for interrogation and then into supervised exile, a surrender of Iraqi troops, and the admission that Iraq had weapons of mass destruction.

Hage has since become embroiled in a situation involving an earlier incident involving airport security that many have viewed as payback similar to the case of Valerie Plame.

== United Kingdom ultimatum ==
On 12 March 2003, the Prime Minister of the United Kingdom (UK), Tony Blair, and the UK Foreign Secretary Jack Straw proposed a draft resolution to the United Nations. If the demands for disarmament were met by 17 March, it was suggested that military action would be averted and Saddam Hussein would be allowed to remain in power.

The six tests involved:

- a public statement by Saddam Hussein, broadcast in Iraq, admitting possession of weapons of mass destruction, stating his regime has decided to give them up and pledging to cooperate with UN weapon inspectors.
- a commitment to allow Iraqi scientists to be interviewed by the inspectors outside Iraq.
- the surrender of, and explanation of the 10,000 litres of anthrax the Iraqis are believed still to be holding.
- a commitment to the destruction of proscribed missiles.
- an account of the unmanned aerial vehicles and remotely piloted vehicles or drones.
- a commitment to surrender all mobile bio-production laboratories for destruction.

Saddam denied possession of weapons of mass destruction. Iraqi intelligence offered to allow several thousand American troops to search for banned weapons.

By offering the opportunity for Saddam to remain in power, it suggested Blair's only justification at that time was the presence of weapons of mass destruction and any other justifications are ex post facto justifications. On 27 March 2003, UK government whistleblowers suggested that even if the tests were met, Iraq would have been invaded.

== Exile proposal ==
It has been suggested that Saddam Hussein was prepared to go into exile if allowed to keep $1 billion USD. On 22 February, at a meeting in Crawford, Texas, George Bush told Spanish prime minister Jose Maria Aznar:

"The Egyptians are speaking to Saddam Hussein. It seems he's indicated he would be prepared to go into exile if he's allowed to take $1 billion and all the information he wants about weapons of mass destruction."

The same month Russian President Vladimir Putin sent his representative, former prime minister Yevgeny Primakov, to Saddam Hussein. Primakov's mission was to convince Saddam to abdicate as Iraqi president, which could prevent US invasion of Iraq. The debates failed, though. "Saddam just tapped me on the shoulder and went out of the room", Primakov recalled.

In late October 2005, the son of Sheikh Zayed bin Sultan Al Nahyan (the late president of the United Arab Emirates) stated that Saddam Hussein had in fact accepted the offer of exile in that country. Under the deal, Saddam and his family would have fled, been granted immunity from prosecution, and elections would have been held in Iraq within six months under UN and Arab League auspices. However, according to him, the Arab League did not bring up the issue at their emergency summit, citing rules preventing interference in the affairs of their member states, thus preventing it from being accepted. Anonymous officials in the UAE have confirmed the report.

There was also speculation that Saddam would go into exile in Belarus. After the invasion, there was concern that members of Hussein's regime were trying to flee to that country.
