= Confidence Building Measures for the Cyprus dispute =

Part of the Cyprus peace process

Confidence Building Measures for the Cyprus dispute is a measure implemented by the United Nations force in Cyprus and aims to bring an end to the Cyprus dispute. Confidence Building Measures have been proposed by Andreas Mavroyiannis representing Nicos Anastasiades and Kudret Ozersay representing Derviş Eroğlu. Joe Biden in his two-day visit to Cyprus in May 2014 has been characterised as a catalyst for empowering Confidence Building Measures between the two sides.

== History of confidence building measures ==
There is a long history of confidence building measures in Cyprus starting from 1963.

The Republic of Cyprus has provided to its occupied areas, free electricity, worth 283 million euros, and free supply of water, the worth of more than 14 million Euros. It also gives to the Turkish Cypriots free medical care and free education in private schools, Cypriot passports, pensions and social insurance benefits and has them eligible for the same free assistance in money, for University education, as the rest of Cypriots.

The semi-state TV channel of the Republic of Cyprus, CyBC, has television programs in Turkish and the Government of Cyprus pays most of UNFICYP expenses, which serves both communities.

The Turkish Cypriot authorities from 2003 and onwards, have opened the roadblocks and permitted Greek Cypriot visits, and they have cooperated with the Republic of Cyprus for the implementation of the Nicosia Sewerage Project and the Nicosia Master Plan.

== Confidence building measures 2015 ==
In May 2015, Cypriot President Nicos Anastasiades and Turkish Cypriot leader Mustafa Akinci, agreed to confidence building measures.

The government of the Republic of Cyprus gave the coordinates of 28 minefields in Pentadaktylos and the Turkish Cypriot authorities agreed, as to no longer require Greek Cypriots to fill in visa forms at crossing points, but instead show their id.

== See also ==
- Operation Atilla
- United Nations High Commissioner for Refugees Representation in Cyprus
- Turkish invasion of Cyprus
