= 2008–2012 Cyprus talks =

Cyprus peace process talks

The 2008-2012 Cyprus talks were held as part of the long-going peace process, in order to resolve the Cyprus dispute. The talks failed to achieve their goals. An opinion poll conducted in 2010 reported that 84% of Greek Cypriots and 70% of Turkish Cypriots assumed that: "the other side would never accept the actual compromises and concessions that are needed for a fair and viable settlement". At the beginning of 2013, Cyprus negotiations were suspended because of a change of government in the Greek Cypriot community of Cyprus.

== 2008 elections in the Republic of Cyprus ==
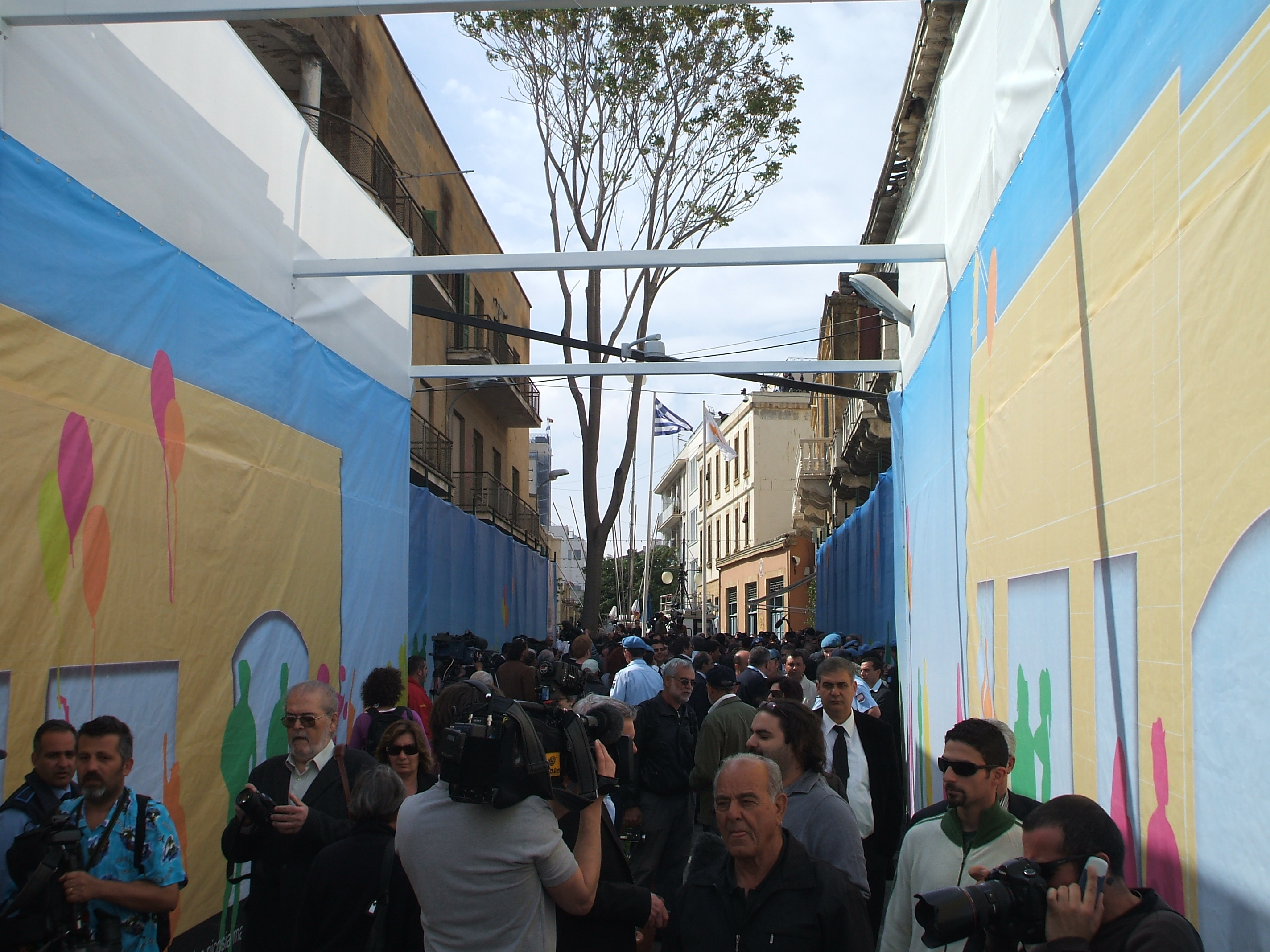
Opening of Ledra Street in April 2008

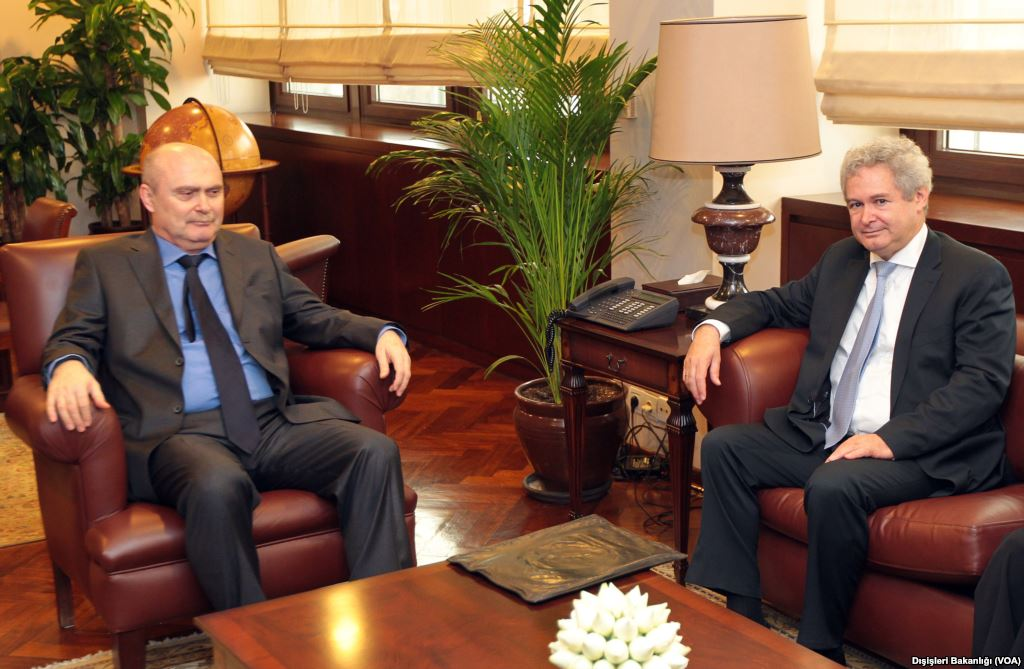
Feridun Sinirlioğlu and Andreas Mavroyiannis (27 February 2014)

In the 2008 presidential elections, Papadopoulos was defeated by AKEL candidate Dimitris Christofias, who pledged to restart talks on reunification immediately. Speaking on the election result, Mehmet Ali Talat stated that "this forthcoming period will be a period during which the Cyprus problem can be solved within a reasonable space of time – despite all difficulties – provided that there is will". Christofias held his first meeting as president with the Turkish Cypriot leader on 21 March 2008 in the UN buffer zone in Nicosia. At the meeting, the two leaders agreed to launch a new round of "substantive" talks on reunification, and to reopen Ledra Street, which has been cut in two since the intercommunal violence of the 1960s and has come to symbolise the island's division. On 3 April 2008, after barriers had been removed, the Ledra Street crossing was reopened in the presence of Greek and Turkish Cypriot officials.

== Preparatory talks ==
A first meeting of the technical committees was set to take place on 18 April 2008. Talat and Christofias met socially at a cocktail party on 7 May 2008, and agreed to meet regularly to review the progress of the talks so far. A second formal summit was held on 23 May 2008 to review the progress made in the technical committees.

At a meeting on 1 July 2008, the two leaders agreed in principle on the concepts of a single citizenship and a single sovereignty, and decided to start direct reunification talks very soon; on the same date, former Australian foreign minister Alexander Downer was appointed as the new UN envoy for Cyprus. Christofias and Talat agreed to meet again on 25 July 2008 for a final review of the preparatory work before the actual negotiations would start. Christofias was expected to propose a rotating presidency for the united Cypriot state. Talat stated he expected they would set a date to start the talks in September, and reiterated that he would not agree to abolishing the guarantor roles of Turkey and Greece.

After the conclusion of negotiations, a reunification plan would be put to referendums in both communities.

In December 2008, the Athenian socialist daily newspaper To Vima described a "crisis" in relations between Christofias and Talat, with the Turkish Cypriots beginning to speak openly of a loose "confederation", an idea strongly opposed by Nicosia. Tensions were further exacerbated by Turkey's harassment of Cypriot vessels engaged in oil exploration in the island's Exclusive Economic Zone, and by the Turkish Cypriot leadership's alignment with Ankara's claim that Cyprus has no continental shelf.

On 29 April 2009, Talat stated that if the Court of Appeal of England and Wales (that will put the last point in the Orams' case) makes a decision just like in the same spirit with the decision of European Court of Justice (ECJ) then the Negotiation Process in Cyprus will be damaged in such a way that it will never be repaired once more. The European Commission warned the Republic of Cyprus not to turn Orams' case legal fight to keep their holiday home into a political battle over the divided island.

On 31 January 2010, United Nations Secretary-General Ban Ki-moon arrived in Cyprus to accelerate talks aimed at reuniting the country.

The election of nationalist Derviş Eroğlu of the National Unity Party as president in Northern Cyprus on 18 April is expected to complicate reunification negotiations. Talks were resumed after the elections in late May, however, and Eroǧlu stated on 27 May 2010 he was now also in favour of a federal state, a change from his previous positions.

In early June 2010, talks reached an impasse and UN Special Advisor Alexander Downer called on the two leaders to decide whether they wanted a solution or not.

== Tripartite meetings ==
On 18 November 2010, 1st tripartite meeting (Ban, Christofias, Eroglu) occurred in New York City without any agreement over the main issues.

On 26 January 2011, 2nd tripartite meeting (Ban, Christofias, Eroglu) occurred in Geneva, Switzerland without any agreement over the main issues.

In March 2011, United Nations Secretary-General Ban Ki-moon reported, "The negotiations cannot be an open-ended process, nor can we afford interminable talks for the sake of talks".

On 18 March 2011, Greek Cypriots and Turkish Cypriots realised 100th negotiation since April 2008 without any agreement over the main issues.

By mid-2011, there was a renewed push for an end to negotiations by the end of 2011 in order to have a united Cyprus take over the EU presidency on 1 July 2012.

On 7 July 2011, the 3rd tripartite meeting (Ban, Christofias, Eroglu) occurred in Geneva, Switzerland without any agreement over the main issues.

On 30–31 October 2011, the 4th tripartite meeting (Ban, Christofias, Eroglu) occurred in New York City without any agreement over the main issues. Ban said that the talks are coming to an end.

On 23–24 January 2012, the 5th tripartite meeting (Ban, Christofias, Eroglu) occurred in New York City without any agreement over the main issues. Ban said "I will be providing a report to the Security Council on the status of the negotiations at the end of February. At the end of March, I will seek a review of the process from my Special Adviser, Alexander Downer. If his report is positive, consistent with relevant Security Council resolutions and following consultations with the two sides, I intend to call a multilateral conference in late April or early May".

On 21 April 2012, United Nations Secretary-General Ban Ki-moon said "there is not enough progress on core issues of reunification talks for calling an international conference". International observers qualified the situation as the "collapse of reunification talks", "last chance for Cyprus reunification lost", "UN-led rounds of talks have failed" and the "failure of UN Cyprus campaign for reunification". On 27 April 2012, Special Advisor of the Secretary-General Alexander Downer said "If the Greek Cypriot and Turkish Cypriot Leaders cannot agree with each other on a model for a united Cyprus, then United Nations cannot make them".

== Breakdown of talks ==
At the end of September 2012, Turkish Republic of Northern Cyprus President Dervis Eroglu said that joint committees with the Greek Cypriot side had been set up to take confidence-building measures.

In 2012, the European Union(EU)-funded project "Reconciliation and Peace Economics in Cyprus" found that "There was little hope for a settlement in the island and the UN-sponsored talks again failed".

At the beginning of 2013, Cyprus negotiations were suspended because of a change of government in the Greek Cypriot community of Cyprus.

== Aftermath ==
On 29 May 2013, President of Rep. of Cyprus, Anastasiades, said "Any new round of talks will not begin from the point they ended in 2012". On 11 February 2014, Alexander Downer, UN Secretary-General's special adviser, stepped down.

In February 2014, the Greek and Turkish Cypriot leaders declared a Joint Communique. leading to a new round of talks.
