= Annan Plan =

United Nations proposal to resolve the Cyprus dispute

The Annan Plan (/ˈænæn/), also known as the Cyprus reunification plan, was a United Nations proposal to resolve the Cyprus dispute. The different parts of the proposal were based on the argumentation put forward by each party (Turkish Cypriots and Greek Cypriots) in meetings held under the auspices of the UN. The proposal was to restructure the Republic of Cyprus to become the "United Republic of Cyprus" (Greek: Ενωμένη Κυπριακή Δημοκρατία, romanized: Enoméne Kypriakí Dimokratía; Turkish: Birleşik Kıbrıs Cumhuriyeti), a federation of two states. It was revised a number of times before it was put to the people of Cyprus in a 2004 referendum, and was supported by 65% of Turkish Cypriots and rejected by 76% of Greek Cypriots.

== Proposal ==
Proposed flag of the United Republic of Cyprus

The Annan Plan (named after UN Secretary-General Kofi Annan) underwent five revisions before it reached its final version. The fifth revision proposed the creation of the United Republic of Cyprus, covering the island of Cyprus entirely except for the UK's Sovereign Base Areas. This new country was to be a federation of two constituent states – the Greek Cypriot State and the Turkish Cypriot State – joined by a federal government apparatus.

This federal level, purported to be loosely based on the Swiss federal model, would incorporate the following elements:

- A collective Presidential Council, made up of six voting members, was allocated according to population (per present levels, four Greek Cypriots and two Turkish Cypriots), and selected and voted in by parliament. An additional three non-voting members would be assigned 2:1.
- A president and vice president, chosen by the Presidential Council from among its members, one from each community, to alternate in their functions every 10 months during the council's five-year term of office.
- A bicameral legislature:
  - A Senate (upper house), with 48 members, divided 24:24 between the two communities.
  - A Chamber of Deputies (lower house), with 48 members, divided proportionately to the two communities' populations (with no fewer than 12 for the smaller community).
- A Supreme Court composed of equal numbers of Greek Cypriot and Turkish Cypriot judges, plus three foreign judges; to be appointed by the Presidential Council.

The plan included a federal constitution, constitutions for each constituent state, a string of constitutional and federal laws, and a proposal for a United Cyprus Republic flag and a national anthem. (The United Nations had received 1,506 flag designs and 111 anthem proposals prior to the committee's agreement.) It also provided for a Reconciliation Commission to bring the two communities closer together and resolve outstanding disputes from the past.

It would also have established a limited right to return between the territories of the two communities, and it would have allowed both Greece and Turkey to maintain a permanent military presence on the island, albeit with large, phased reductions in troop numbers.

== Negotiations ==
=== Annan Plans I & II ===
Following the United Nations Security Council Resolution 1250 of 29 June 1999, which requested the Secretary-General to invite the two leaders of the communities on Cyprus to negotiations, Álvaro de Soto was appointed as Special Advisor to the Secretary-General on Cyprus (1 November), the Secretary-General visited Turkey and U.S. President Bill Clinton visited Turkey and Greece (November), and proximity talks in New York were arranged beginning 3 December. The motivation for this renewed attempt at a Cyprus settlement was Cyprus' impending membership of the EU, and the fear that this development would create an obstacle to Turkey's hopes of joining. This prospect was of particular concern not only to Turkey, but also to the US and the UK, which were both keen to promote Turkey's membership of the EU. A further concern was the future of the British military bases and installations on Cyprus which were regarded as essential by both the UK and USA.

On 10–11 December, the Helsinki EU summit's conclusions welcomed the launch of the talks in New York and declared that "a political settlement will facilitate the accession of Cyprus to the European Union." This was followed by the observation that "If no settlement has been reached by the completion of accession negotiations, the Council's decision on accession will be made without the above being a precondition." The EU kept its options open, however, by adding: "In this the Council will take account of all relevant factors."

Following the talks in New York, four more rounds of proximity talks were held in Geneva: 31 January – 8 February 24 July – 4 August, 12–26 September, and 1–10 November 2000. On 24 November, in response to the Secretary-General's assessment of the talks (8 November 2000), which the leader of the Turkish Cypriots Rauf Denktaş rejected, Denktaş announced his withdrawal from the talks "because no progress could be made until two separate states are recognized". He was supported in his decision by Turkey.

After almost a year of no talks and therefore little progress, Álvaro de Soto announced on 5 September 2001 that "on behalf of the Secretary-General I have conveyed to his Excellency The Greek Cypriot Leader Glafcos Clerides and Rauf Denktaş, the Turkish Cypriot leader, an invitation to resume the search for a comprehensive settlement to the Cyprus problem under the Secretary-General's auspices... with separate meetings of the Secretary-General with each of the two leaders on 12 September 2001 in New York." Denktaş rejected Annan's invitation on the same day, but the visit to Cyprus in October 2001 of the President of the European Commission Romano Prodi prompted him to think again. During his visit Prodi stated that Cyprus would become an EU member with or without a settlement. Shortly thereafter Denktaş entered into correspondence with Clerides, and a meeting in the presence of Álvaro de Soto was organised in Nicosia on 4 December 2001. After the meeting, de Soto announced that the two leaders had agreed the following:

- That the United Nations Secretary-General, in the exercise of his mission of good offices, would invite the two leaders to direct talks;
- That these talks would be held in Cyprus starting in mid January 2002 on UN premises;
- That there would be no preconditions;
- That all issues would be on the table;
- That they would continue to negotiate in good faith until a comprehensive settlement was achieved;
- That nothing would be agreed until everything was agreed.

The new round of talks was held in Nicosia and ran from 16 January. In September the venue was moved to Paris, and then, in October, meetings were held in New York. After the New York meetings, Álvaro de Soto read a message from the Secretary-General to the effect that "a comprehensive settlement has to be a complex, integrated, legally binding and self-executing agreement, where the rights and obligations of all concerned are clear, unambiguous, and not subject to further negotiations."

On 11 November 2002, Álvaro de Soto presented a comprehensive plan for the resolution of the Cyprus issue (Annan Plan I). Following feedback, but no negotiations between the two sides, a revised version was published on 10 December (Annan Plan II), two days before the EU Copenhagen summit. In his report to the Security Council of 1 April 2003, Kofi Annan revealed that the Copenhagen European Council Summit of 12 and 13 December 2002 was seen as a deadline:

My Special Adviser helped to guide the discussions and by mid-2002 he was making concrete suggestions to assist the parties to build bridges. I refrained however from making a written substantive input until 11 November 2002, when, no breakthrough having been achieved, and believing that no other course of action remained open if the opportunity was to be seized, I put forward a document which I believed constituted a sound basis for agreement on a comprehensive settlement. Following intensive consultations, I put forward a revised proposal on 10 December 2002, hoping to assist the parties to reach agreement in time for the Copenhagen European Council on 12 and 13 December 2002.

According to Claire Palley, the revisions to Annan Plan I "were not even-handed".

"... seen overall, the changes to Annan I, made before the Copenhagen summit, began to tilt the balance further than the existing 'compromises' in the 'bridging proposals' even though, for the sake of 'face', some relatively minor changes were made in response to Greek-Cypriot representations."

Intense pressure was exerted on both sides to agree to Annan Plan II before the Copenhagen Summit decision regarding Cyprus' membership application but to no avail. Nevertheless, the summit confirmed that all of Cyprus would become a member on 1 May 2004, but "in the absence of a settlement, the application of the acquis to the northern part of the island shall be suspended".

Cyprus will be admitted as a new Member State to the European Union. Nevertheless, the European Council confirms its strong preference for accession to the European Union by a united Cyprus. In this context it welcomes the commitment of the Greek Cypriots and the Turkish Cypriots to continue to negotiate with the objective of concluding a comprehensive settlement of the Cyprus problem by 28 February 2003 on the basis of the UNSG's proposals. The European Council believes that those proposals offer a unique opportunity to reach a settlement in the coming weeks and urges the leaders of the Greek Cypriot and Turkish Cypriot communities to seize this opportunity....

The European Council has decided that, in the absence of a settlement, the application of the acquis to the northern part of the island shall be suspended, until the Council decides unanimously otherwise, on the basis of a proposal by the Commission. Meanwhile, the Council invites the Commission, in consultation with the government of Cyprus, to consider ways of promoting economic development of the northern part of Cyprus and bringing it closer to the Union.

At the same time Turkey was told that a decision on a start date for accession negotiations would be delayed until after Cyprus had joined.

If the European Council in December 2004, on the basis of a report and a recommendation from the Commission, decides that Turkey fulfils the Copenhagen political criteria, the European Union will open accession negotiations with Turkey without delay.

=== Annan Plan III ===
There now followed a hasty attempt on the part of Álvaro de Soto and his team to come up with a version of the Plan which both sides could accept before 28 February 2003, a deadline which had been set by the EU so that the whole process could be completed before Cyprus's signature of the EU accession treaty, which took place on 16 April 2003.

In his Report of 1 April 2003, Kofi Annan wrote that he believed Annan III, which was submitted to the two sides two days before the deadline, should be the final version of the plan.

During the last week in February, I visited Turkey, Greece and Cyprus, and on 26 February I formally presented a third, and what I believed should be final, version of my plan, entitled Basis for a Comprehensive Settlement of the Cyprus Problem. Prior to my visit my Special Adviser had contributed to writing the important changes I had in mind. This version contained further refinements, particularly addressing the basic requirements of the Turkish side at the same time as meeting a number of Greek Cypriot concerns in order to maintain the overall balance. I also filled in all remaining gaps in the core parts of the plan, particularly those relating to security on which Greece and Turkey had not been able to agree.

According to Claire Palley, the UN team had "again made changes meeting Turkish concerns", and she cites the phrase "particularly addressing the basic requirements of the Turkish side" from the paragraph above as confirmation.

Having presented the "final" version of the Plan, Kofi Annan invited the Greek and Turkish Cypriot leaders to The Hague on 10 March, where they were to inform him whether they were prepared "to sign a commitment to submit the plan for approval at separate simultaneous referendums on 30 March 2003". In the meantime the Plan had been altered with the addition of extensive "Corrigenda and clarifications", and in this new form was presented to the leaders on 7 March 2003. On the Greek Cypriot side there had been a change of leadership following elections on 16 February in which Tassos Papadopoulos was elected President of the Republic of Cyprus. He received the altered Plan when he was on his way to The Hague to meet the Secretary-General.

On 10 March 2003 in The Hague, Netherlands, the UN effort collapsed when Denktaş told the Secretary-General he would not put the Annan Plan to referendum. According to the BBC, "ultimately it was the Turkish Cypriot side which refused to even talk further, and which was blamed for the failure of the peace process." In the same news article Denktaş is quoted as saying: "The plan was unacceptable for us. This was not a plan we would ask our people to vote for."

In his report, Kofi Annan saw this as the end of the road:

On 11 March, at 0530 hours and following negotiations with the two leaders and the guarantor Powers lasting more than 19 hours, I announced that there had been no such agreement, and at that point the process which had begun in December 1999 reached the end of the road. The office in Cyprus of my Special Adviser, which opened in advance of the direct talks, is to close during April.

=== Annan Plans IV & V ===
As 2003 came to a close and the date for Cyprus's accession to the EU approached, a flurry of diplomatic activity got under way to revive the negotiations. US State Department Special Cyprus Coordinator Thomas Weston met with Foreign Minister George Papandreou in Washington on 17 September 2003 and told him the USA wanted "an immediate restart of talks by the two sides on the island".

At the meeting of the European Council in Brussels on 12 December 2003, the Council reiterated its preference "for a reunited Cyprus to join the Union on 1 May 2004" and urged "all parties concerned, and in particular Turkey and the Turkish Cypriot leadership, to strongly support the UN Secretary General's efforts" in an "immediate resumption of the talks on the basis of his proposals".

In December Thomas Weston visited Greece, Cyprus, and Turkey; and the US President George Bush wrote to the Greek Prime Minister Costas Simitis on 26 December urging him to push for a Cyprus settlement: "We now have a window of opportunity to reach a settlement so that a united Cyprus joins the European Union. We must not let that window close."

Simitis responded by praising the Greek Cypriot side and pointing out that "time is running out due to the Turkish side's unwillingness to cooperate".

In the meantime parliamentary elections in Northern Cyprus (14 December 2003) had changed the political landscape. Mehmet Ali Talat leading a coalition of pro-Annan-Plan parties had narrowly defeated the incumbent Prime Minister Derviş Eroğlu. Elections had recently brought about a change of leadership in Turkey too, and Recep Tayyip Erdoğan had become prime minister on 14 March 2003. The Justice and Development Party implemented a major policy shift by supporting the peace process in the island. Erdoğan, keen to make progress on the issue of EU membership for Turkey, was "not in favor of following the Cyprus policy that has been followed for the last 30 or 40 years". He criticised Denktaş, saying, "This is not Mr. Denktaş's personal business," and adding that Denktaş "should pay more attention to what Turkish Cypriots think and the growing protest against his rule". However analysts have suggested that he and Denktaş were not so far apart in what they wanted from a settlement—they merely disagreed on tactics, with Erdoğan preferring that: "Neither Turkey nor Turkish Cyprus should give an uncompromising impression. We should not be the side keeping away from the negotiating table."

Following intervention by Erdoğan, the outcome of post-election manoeuvring in Northern Cyprus was that Talat formed a government in alliance with the Democratic Party led by Rauf Denktaş's son Serdar Denktaş. However Rauf Denktaş remained president, since the president is elected at separate elections.

On 4 February 2004, after having discussed matters with President Bush, Kofi Annan sent a letter to both sides in which he invited them to New York on 10 February 2004. In his letter, Annan proposed that talks resume with the aim of finalizing the plan by 31 March, and holding the referendum on 21 April. He also reserved for himself the task of completing the text of the plan if necessary:

"It is clearly desirable that the text should emerge completed from the negotiations... However, should that not happen, I would, by 31 March, make any indispensable suggestions to complete the text. Naturally I would only do this with the greatest of reluctance..."

At New York pressure was exerted on the two sides to grant the Secretary-General the powers of an arbitrator or mediator, but the Greek-Cypriot side would not agree. The Security Council had asked the Secretary-General to facilitate negotiations within the framework of his "good offices", and any extension to that mandate should have been sought from the Security Council, where, however, any one of its members could have used a veto to deny the request.

After intense negotiations the procedure outlined in Annan's letter was organised into phases. In Phase 1 the Cypriot parties would negotiate "within the framework of my [Annan's] mission of good offices" in Nicosia from 19 February in order to produce a final text by 22 March. Negotiations were to be restricted to matters that fell "within the parameters of the Plan".

In the absence of agreement, Phase 2 would involve the Secretary-General convening a meeting of the two sides, "with the participation of Greece and Turkey in order to lend their collaboration, in a concentrated effort to agree on a finalized text by 29 March."

In Phase 3 the Secretary-General would use his "discretion to finalize the text to be submitted to referenda on the basis of my plan".

The procedure enlarged the role foreseen for me, from completing any unfinished parts of the plan (filling in the blanks) to resolving any continuing and persistent deadlocks in the negotiations...

When Phase 1 got under way, the two Cypriot leaders, Rauf Denktaş and Tassos Papadopoulos, met nearly every day for negotiations facilitated by Álvaro de Soto. In addition, numerous technical committees and subcommittees met in parallel to work on the details. In his report the UNSG noted that Phase 1 of the effort "did not produce significant progress at the political level. However, positive results were achieved at the technical level by experts from the two sides assisted by United Nations experts."

According to Claire Palley, problems and delays were created in this phase by Denktaş's insistence on "producing proposals well beyond the Plan's parameters". For example, the Turkish side "demanded massive EU derogations", and "insisted on a right for all Turkish settlers to remain". James Ker-Lindsay notes that: "The situation was also hindered by the bad atmosphere generated by Rauf Denktaş, who appeared determined to scupper the process by holding frequent press conferences at which he revealed as much as he could to the media."

In addition Denktaş caused a "mini-crisis" (so described in Annan's Report) by declaring that he would not be attending the Phase 2 talks. In fact it was a major crisis. Technically the Phase 2 talks could not take place without the Turkish Cypriot leader there to negotiate with the Greek Cypriot leader, and Tassos Papadopoulos would have been within his rights to refuse to participate in the absence of the leader of the Turkish Cypriots. As it was he merely "stressed the need for a credible interlocutor who would represent the Turkish Cypriot side" and pointed out at the last Phase 1 meeting that no progress had been achieved on substantial issues.

Phase 2 was scheduled to take place on the Swiss Bürgenstock on 24 March 2004. After consultation with the Turkish government, Denktaş agreed to confer full negotiating authority on Talat the Prime Minister, and his son Serdar Denktaş, the Foreign Minister. According to Claire Palley, the Greek Cypriot side was pressured by "the UN and various Powers" to treat Talat and Serdar Denktaş as leaders, but in reality Rauf Denktaş remained leader of the Turkish Cypriots "able at any time to withdraw his negotiating authority or to veto decisions."

At the Bürgenstock, the Turkish side wanted quadrilateral meetings (the two Cypriot delegations plus Greece and Turkey), but the Greek Cypriots objected that this had been discussed and rejected at the New York meetings. The role of the Greek and Turkish representatives was not supposed to include participating directly in the negotiations.

The first meeting for negotiations between the Cypriot sides was arranged for 24 March, but it was cancelled by de Soto at the request of Talat, two hours before it was to take place. No further formal meetings were arranged. Instead de Soto tried to get Tassos Papadopoulos to give him a prioritised wish list. The Greek Cypriots feared that if they gave such a list it would be used to justify "trade-offs" and thus allow for drastic changes to the plan in Phase 3 outside of already agreed parameters.

On 25 March de Soto tried to get the Cypriot parties to sign a commitment document, but it was pointed out to him that this was not part of the agreed procedure.

On 26 March Ambassador Uğur Ziyal of Turkey's Foreign Ministry gave a list of "Final Points" to de Soto with the demand that the changes requested therein be made by the UN team. When the Turkish Prime Minister Erdoğan arrived in Bürgenstock on 29 March, he was informed by Annan that nine of his eleven "points" had been agreed to by the UN team, and that the other two were virtually met. That this was the case became clear when Annan Plan IV was presented to the two sides on 29 March, and the Turkish side leaked Ziyal's document.

The delegations were asked by Annan to provide him with their comments on Annan IV, which contained "numerous amendments, including changes on core issues and reopening substantial trade-offs, previously agreed" within less than 24 hours so that he could finalise the Plan. The final plan, Annan Plan V, was tabled on 31 March. It met all of Turkey's demands. In presenting it Kofi Annan said:

Let me be clear. The choice is not between this settlement plan and some other magical or mythical solution. In reality, at this stage, the choice is between this settlement and no settlement.... This plan is fair. It is designed to work. And I believe it provides Cypriots with a secure framework for a common future. At the end of the day, of course, it does not matter what I think. It is what the people think that counts. They decide—and rightly so.

== Position of political parties ==
Choice	Cyprus		Northern Cyprus	
Yes	Democratic Rally	Liberal conservatism	Republican Turkish Party	Social democracy
Yes	United Democrats	Social liberalism	Peace and Democracy Movement	Social democracy
Yes			Communal Liberation Party	Social democracy
Yes			United Cyprus Party	Democratic socialism
Yes			New Cyprus Party	Democratic socialism
Yes			Socialist Party of Cyprus	Democratic socialism
No	Progressive Party of Working People (lean "yes" initially)	Eurocommunism	National Unity Party	National conservatism
No	Democratic Party	Centrism	Democratic Party	Conservatism
No	Movement for Social Democracy	Social democracy	Nationalist Justice Party	Idealism
No	New Horizons	Right-wing populism		
No	Fighting Democratic Movement	Conservatism		
No	Ecological and Environmental Movement	Green politics		
No	For Europe	National conservatism		

== Referendum ==
The separate simultaneous referendums held in Cyprus on 24 April 2004 resulted in the majority Greek Cypriot population voting down the UN Plan (75.38% against), whereas the minority Turkish Cypriot population voted for the Plan (64.91% in favour). The turn-out was high: 89.18% for the Greek Cypriots and 87% for the Turkish Cypriots.

The political leaders of both sides (Tassos Papadopoulos and Rauf Denktaş) had campaigned for a 'no' vote, but Talat had campaigned for a 'yes' vote, strongly supported by Turkey.

In exit polls 75% of the Greek Cypriots who voted 'No' cited 'security concerns' as the main reason for their choice. Opponents pointed to Turkey being allowed to keep a large number of troops in Cyprus after a settlement, something Greece was also allowed to do, whereas the National Guard was to be dissolved and the new Cypriot Republic demilitarised.

An academic study of the electorate's response to the Annan Plan states that it was doomed to rejection at the polls, because it was developed through an "ill-designed process of secret diplomacy" which disregarded the views of the Cypriot public. The study recommends that future efforts should incorporate consultation with the public into the negotiation process.

=== Results ===
Choice	Greek Cypriots		Turkish Cypriots		Total voters	
Choice	Votes	%	Votes	%	Votes	%
For	99,976	24.17	77,646	64.91	177,622	33.30
Against	313,704	75.83	41,973	35.09	355,677	66.70
Invalid/blank votes	14,907	3.48	5,344	4.28	20,251	3.66
Total	428,587	100	124,963	100	553,550	100
Registered voters/turnout	480,564	89.18	143,636	87.00	624,200	88.68
Source: GreekNews, Election Guide

== After the referendum ==
After the referendums, the UN welcomed the Turkish Cypriot people's vote, and in response renewed calls to lift the embargo and restore direct economic, political and social engagement with Northern Cyprus, effective immediately. The UN Secretary-General's 28 May 2004 report (S/2004/437) specifically outlined Annan's call to "... eliminate unnecessary restrictions and barriers that have the effect of isolating the Turkish Cypriots and impeding their development", and urged that "if the Greek Cypriots are ready to share power and prosperity with the Turkish Cypriots in a federal structure based on political equality, this needs to be demonstrated, not just by word, but by action", in response to the vast contrast between votes.

== International opinions ==
=== Support for the plan ===
==== United Nations ====
- The Security Council... respects the outcome of both referenda... shares the Secretary-General's disappointment that efforts since 1999 to reunify the island have not succeeded and regrets that an extraordinary and historic opportunity to resolve the Cyprus issue has been missed. The Security Council reiterates its strong support for an overall political settlement in Cyprus.
  - Security Council Statement on Cyprus, 30 April 2004.
- I remain convinced that the plan I put forward is the only realistic basis for reunifying the island, which I believe is the sincere desire of the majority of Cypriots in both communities. I hope that before too long the Greek Cypriots will have an opportunity to consider the plan more calmly, and to judge it on its true merits.
  - Kofi Annan, UN Secretary-General, Press Conference, UN Headquarters, New York, 28 April 2004.
- Together with a broad cross-section of the international community, the Secretary-General remains convinced that the settlement plan put to the two sides in today's referenda represents a fair, viable and carefully balanced compromise—one that conforms with the long-agreed parameters for a solution and with the Security Council's vision for a settlement, and meets the minimum requirements of all concerned.
  - Statement attributable to the Spokesman of the Secretary-General Álvaro de Soto, 24 April 2004.

==== European Union ====
A few days before the referendum, the European Parliament passed a resolution on Cyprus on 21 April 2004 which included the following statements:

The European Parliament

- 2. Expresses its support, and welcomes the initiative of the United Nations Secretary-General...
- 3. Acknowledges – although it would unreservedly welcome a united Cyprus as a member of the European Union – the right of Cypriots to decide for themselves on the plan in a referendum without pressure from the outside and will respect such a decision, but points out that a broad, fact-based information campaign is still necessary;
- 4. Considers that this final document constitutes a historic compromise which would end one of the longest-running conflicts in Europe and could serve as a shining example for handling equally difficult international issues;
- 5. Considers that the final revised plan institutionalises a functional federal system of government which is able to ensure that a reunited Cyprus can speak with one voice and fully play its role in the framework of the European institutions, and calls on all parties to fulfil their obligations with honesty and openness;

Following the referendum the European Commission issued the following statement to the press:

The European Commission deeply regrets that the Greek Cypriot community did not approve the comprehensive settlement of the Cyprus problem, but it respects the democratic decision of the people. A unique opportunity to bring about a solution to the long-lasting Cyprus issue has been missed. The European Commission would like to warmly congratulate Turkish Cypriots for their "Yes" vote. This signals a clear desire of the community to resolve the island's problem. The Commission is ready to consider ways of further promoting economic development of the northern part of Cyprus...

==== United Kingdom ====
- We must now act to end the isolation of northern Cyprus. That means lifting the sanctions on trade and travel. That means also ensuring that EU funds currently available for dispersal are actually dispersed.
  - Press statement of the UK Prime Minister Tony Blair 2004.
- The UK Government believes steps should be taken as quickly as possible to end the isolation of the Turkish Cypriots.
  - Deputy Foreign Minister of UK Baroness Symons 2004.
- The Turkish Cypriots can reasonably ask that they should not be the victims of this setback; and yet it is they who are left in limbo outside the European Union. But what is now needed, surely, is to remove all discrimination against people who are, after all, citizens of the European Union and to prepare the Turkish Cypriots and their legislation and administrative practices for eventual European membership.
  - Speech of UK Special Representative for Cyprus David Hannay, Baron Hannay of Chiswick, 2004.
- I believe that it was a great shame that the Greek Cypriots voted no, and that it was a mistake to reject the Annan plan. We strongly believe that the Turkish Cypriots, who voted for a peaceful resolution of the Cyprus problem, should not be penalised because the Greek Cypriots rejected the UN settlement plans. Turkish Cypriots demonstrated their desire to be in the EU, as part of a united island.... The clear majority vote by the Turkish Cypriot community at the referendum on 24 April to accept the UN Secretary General's plan for a settlement of the Cyprus problem has not gone unnoticed. The Government of UK believes steps should be taken as quickly as possible to end the isolation of the Turkish Cypriots.
  - Speech of UK Minister for European Affairs Denis MacShane 2004.

==== United States ====
"We have certainly been looking at steps to ease the isolation of the Turkish Cypriot side. Our ambassador in Cyprus last week announced a step with regard to extending the validity of visas for Turkish Cypriots that makes it easier for them to travel, particularly for the students who might come to the United States. So that's one thing that we've announced already. We'll be looking at other steps that we can take and making those known at the appropriate time."

- US State Department Spokesman Richard Boucher, 2004.

"We are disappointed that a majority of Greek Cypriots voted against the settlement plan. Failure of the referendums in the Greek Cypriot community is a setback to the hopes of those on the island who voted for the settlement and to the international community."

- Spokesman of the US State Department Richard Boucher in 2004

"We think that a Greek Cypriot vote against the settlement means that a unique and historic opportunity was lost. We believe the settlement was fair. It has been accepted by the Turkish Cypriot side. There will not be a better settlement. There is no other deal. There is no better deal available. And we hope that the Greek Cypriots will come to comprehend this in due time.

Turkish Cypriots voted for this settlement.... There's not a new negotiation plan, there's not a renegotiation plan. This is the deal.

We do think that there was a lot of manipulation by the Greek Cypriot leaders in the run-up to the election; that the outcome was regrettable but not surprising, given those actions. I think the Europeans as well have made clear—statements by External Relations Commissioner Chris Patten, European Parliamentary President Pat Cox, Enlargement Commissioner Verheugen—that they have strong concerns in that regard as well."

- US Secretary of State Colin Powell 2004

==== Other ====
Germany "The German Government regrets that a "yes" vote was achieved only in the northern part of the island in today's referenda in Cyprus. It is disappointing that the citizens in the south of the island did not seize the great opportunity for reunification which the Annan Plan offered. Unfortunately, a reunited Cyprus will not now be joining the European Union on 1 May."

- German Foreign Minister Joschka Fischer's statement of 24 April 2004 (unofficial translation)

France "France hopes that the Commission, in accordance with the conclusions of the Copenhagen European Council of December 2002, proposes that proper measures be taken to promote the economic development of the northern part of the island and bring it closer to the Union."

- French Foreign Ministry's statement of 25 April 2004

Bangladesh "Bangladesh expresses its deep disappointment at the rejection of the UN Plan for the reunification of Cyprus, by one community in Cyprus.... Bangladesh believes that those who voted for the UN plan in Cyprus should now be given the opportunity to restore immediately their economic and trade activities internationally without any restriction."

- Bangladesh Foreign Ministry's Press Release of 25 April 2004

Czech Republic "On 1st May 2004, Cyprus will become EU member. The Turkish inhabitants of Cyprus have expressed in the referendum their will for the unification of Cyprus. They should not become hostages of the situation they will face after 1st May resulting from the refusal of the Annan plan in the south part of the island. The Czech MFA believes that the EU and the international community will find a way to help the north part of Cyprus to overcome economic and social consequences of the decades of international isolation."

- Statement by the Czech Foreign Ministry, 24 April 2004

Sweden "We appreciate the initiative of Prime Minister Erdoğan and of the Turkish Government in order to re-unite Cyprus. Now, the EU must evaluate how it can contribute and facilitate the trade in the island and the border crossings between the two parts."

- Swedish Prime Minister Göran Persson, 2004

Austria "The Austrian Foreign Minister Benita Ferrero-Waldner expressed her regret at the negative outcome of the referendum on the Greek side of Cyprus.

The fact that the referendum resulted in a positive vote on the Turkish side of Cyprus should be appropriately honored by the international community."

- Austrian Foreign Minister Ferrero-Waldner 2004

Organisation of the Islamic Conference "It is our duty to put an end to the isolation of Turkish Cypriots."

- Secretary-General of the Organization of Islamic Countries (OIC) Mr. Belkeziz 2004.

"What happened in Cyprus with the Annan plan in reality has nothing to do with the Turkish Cypriots, but the main issue was Turkey's accession into the European Union and the pseudo-state was used as pawn."

- Eser Karakas, Professor at the Bahcesehir University in Turkey, as quoted in Haravgi (Greek Cypriot) newspaper, 27 October 2004

"If the Greek-Cypriots say 'no' to the Annan plan, we will take them to a new referendum, until they say yes."

- David Hannay, Baron Hannay of Chiswick, the British architect of the Annan plan

=== Against the plan ===
"I consider the Annan plan to be fundamentally flawed. To put it in common language I consider that plan to be a non-starter. It is so incompatible with international law and international human rights norms that it is nothing less than shocking that the organisation would bend to political pressure and political interest on the part of my country of nationality [the USA] and Great Britain, in order to cater for the interests of a NATO partner.... I think it is not salvageable, quite honestly. I think it cannot be saved, and if it were saved I think it would be a major disservice not only to the Cypriot people but a disservice to international law; because everything that we at the UN have tried to build over 60 years, the norms of international law that have emerged in international treaties, in resolutions of the Security Council, would be weakened if not made ridiculous by an arrangement that essentially ignores them, makes them irrelevant or acts completely against the letter and spirit of those treaties and resolutions."

- Alfred de Zayas, a leading expert in the field of human rights, as well as a former high-ranking United Nations official.

"It appeared that the UN and the EU were bent on legitimising at least some of the consequences of the Turkish invasion of 1974, because the EU wanted to take the Cyprus issue off the table in order to facilitate negotiations on Turkey's accession to the EU... Greek Cypriots would not have freedom of movement in their own country. In a way, the Greek Cypriots would have been ghettoised."

- Shlomo Avineri, Professor at the Hebrew University of Jerusalem and former Director-General of Israel's foreign ministry.

"... had he [Annan] been more closely involved in the details, [he] would not have wished his name to be historically associated with such departures from international law and human rights standards. ...a significant opportunity to reach an agreed settlement was lost as a result of the conduct of the UN Secretariat, advised by the USA and the UK.... The Secretariat sought to mislead the international community through the Secretary-General's Reports and briefings it prepared, so as to pressure a small state effectively to accept the consequences of aggression by a large neighbouring state allied to two permanent members of the Security Council."

- Claire Palley, Constitutional Law adviser to Cypriot governments since 1980, in 'An International Relations Debacle', 2005

"The terms of the Annan Plan would in fact have embedded instability into the heart of a Cyprus settlement and would inevitably have led to increasing friction and destabilisation. This is underlined by the provisions concerning the position of foreign nationals with effective control over key areas of governmental activities in Cyprus. Examples where non-Cypriots would (in the event of disagreement between the equal numbers of Greek and Turkish Cypriots) have effective control appeared to include the Reconciliation Commission; the Supreme Court invested with legislative and executive powers; the Central Bank; the Relocation Board; the Property Court and the organs of the Property Board. Bearing in mind the experience of the period 1960–63, the need for stability in the ordering of governmental activities is critical. Further, the foreign nationals concerned would not be democratically accountable to the people of Cyprus."

- International Group of Legal Experts (Andreas Auer, Switzerland, Professor of Constitutional Law, University of Geneva; Mark Bossuyt, Belgium, Professor of International Law, University of Antwerp; Peter T. Burns, Canada, Former Dean of the UBC Law Faculty, Professor of Law, University of British Columbia, Vancouver; Alfred de Zayas, USA, Geneva School of Diplomacy, Former Secretary, UN Human Rights Committee; Silvio-Marcus Helmons, Belgium, Emeritus Professor of Université Catholique de Louvain, Public International Law and Human Rights; George Kasimatis, Greece, Emeritus Professor of University of Athens, Constitutional Law, Honorary President of the International Association of Constitutional Law; Dieter Oberndörfer, Germany, Professor Emeritus, Political Science, University of Freiburg; Malcolm N. Shaw QC, UK, The Sir Robert Jennings Professor of International Law, University of Leicester.)

"With regard to the referendums in Cyprus, Parliament's primary objective should be to apply to itself the principles which it is shouting from the rooftops: observance of human rights and respect for democracy. On the first point, the Annan plan raises fundamental objections. How could the European Parliament endorse a proposed settlement which denies refugees the right to recover the property taken from them, which constitutes a permanent restriction on people's freedom of movement and establishment, which perpetuates the presence of occupying troops and which does not provide any recourse against violations of human rights before the Strasbourg Court? On the second point, Parliament must not go along with the scandalous pressure being piled onto the Greek Cypriots by both the United States and the European Commission – and in particular by Commissioner Verheugen, one of the keenest advocates of Turkey's accession to the European Union. The rule of democracy means that the decision of the people must be respected, especially if expressed in the most undeniable way in this respect: a referendum."

- Dominique Souchet, Member European Parliament, France.

"The parties to the UN negotiations, Greece, Turkey, the (Greek) Cypriot government and the (still internationally unrecognized) Turkish Cypriot administration met in April at Bürgenstock in Switzerland, having allowed Kofi Annan in advance to make his own arbitration decisions on any unresolved issues when the negotiations ended; in their final stages a last minute tranche of extra demands were made by the Turkish military—which the Turkish Cypriots had not asked for and did not want. Urged on by the EU and the US, Annan accepted them all—including the proposal that Turkish troops remain in the island in perpetuity. This concession was calculated to smooth the path of Turkey towards EU membership (the deadline for negotiation on which has been set for the end of 2004) and to demonise the Greek Cypriots as scapegoats if a political solution did not materialise. In the short term this part of the plot has worked. The Turkish Cypriot "yes" and the Greek Cypriot "no" in the subsequent referenda generated carefully choreographed accusations against the Greek Cypriots of "democratic irresponsibility", not wanting the island's reunification and jeopardising Turkey's EU membership."

- Christopher Price, former Labour politician in the United Kingdom.

"The final version of the plan isn't a package on which the parties ever agreed. It is a mass of coercions written by aides to the UN secretary-general saying, 'this meets you halfway' and then communicated to the parties. Secondly, there's no precedent in international law of bringing such a blueprint to a referendum. A referendum should be based on a definite text prepared by an authority, or it should be a text on which the parties are agreed so that the people know that the agreement will be accepted if they vote in its favor. None of these conditions now exists. The UN General Secretariat, whose authority is controversial, exercised its 'goodwill mission' [good offices mission] granted by the Security Council and made the parties accept it through threats and deception. The text is devoid of compromise. Thirdly, setting aside judicial disagreements on various issues, this 'map of zones' is a map being presented to those who'll live there without any discussion."

- Mümtaz Soysal in "Mistakes and Deception", Cumhuriyet, 2 April 2004.

== Causes of the outcome ==
=== Reasons for rejection as explained by the Greek Cypriots ===
As summarised by "The Case Against the Annan Plan", from Coufoudakis and Kyriakides and the Letter by the President of the Republic, Mr Tassos Papadopoulos, to the U.N. Secretary-General, Mr Kofi Annan dated 7 June 2004

- The Turkish Cypriot constituent state would have been integrated to Turkey, making the United Cyprus Republic answerable to Turkey.
- Turkey was granted rights to interfere with the Treaty between Egypt and the Republic of Cyprus on the Delimitation of the Exclusive Economic Zone. Cyprus' rights to its Continental Shelf in the south would have also been answerable to Turkey.
- Turkey was granted the right of stationing Turkish troops on the island of Cyprus perpetually.
- Cyprus is 77% Greek and 18% Turkish. 5% of the population are other ethnic group. (2001) The Annan Plan mandates equal representation of Greeks and Turks in the proposed Senate and in the Supreme court, giving 50–50 representation to the two communities and therefore disproportionate representation to the Turks.
- The plan created a confederation even though it utilised the term "federation" because there was no hierarchy of laws, while central authority emanated from the so-called component states. The Supreme court composed of equal numbers of Greek Cypriot (77% of population) and Turkish Cypriot judges (18% of population), plus three foreign judges; thus foreigners would cast deciding votes.
- The Plan did not include a settlement regarding the repatriation of Turkish settlers living on Greek Cypriot owned land in Northern Cyprus, while after 19 years, the possibility of abolishing the derogation of 5% of Greeks and Turkish citizens who could settle in Cyprus, is obvious, and the danger of a permanent mass settling of Cyprus by Turkey is visible.
- Nearly all the Turkish settlers would be granted citizenship or residence rights leading to citizenship. The central government would have limited control towards future Turkish immigration. Those settlers opting to return to Turkey would be compensated by Cyprus and Greek Cypriots. Even though Turkey systematically brought in the settlers to alter the demography of the island, it had no responsibility for their Repatriation.
- The Plan simply disregarded the plain language and clear meaning of the Geneva Convention of 1949, section III, article 49, which prohibits colonisation by an occupying power. Article 49 states in its last paragraph: "The Occupying Power shall not deport or transfer parts of its own civilian population into the territory it occupies."
- The Plan did not deal in full with the issue of demilitarisation of the legally invalid 'TRNC', and Greek Cypriots felt they had no reason to believe Turkish promises concerning the withdrawal of troops.
- Cyprus would be excluded from the European Common Defense and Foreign Policy, while Turkish troops would remain in Cyprus even after the accession of Turkey to the EU with intervention rights, (a military invasion – occasionally used euphemistically), in the future Greek Cypriot component state.
- Many Greek Cypriots interpreted the Right of Return policy as seriously flawed, meaning only 20% of Greek Cypriot refugees would be able to return over a time frame of 25 years, whereas Turkish Cypriots would have had full right of return. The plan denied to all Cypriots rights enjoyed by all other EU citizens (right of free movement and residence, the right to apply to work in any position, including national civil services, the right to vote).
- Turkish Cypriots would have gained all their requested demands in the 24 hours following the referendum, had the plan been accepted. Greek Cypriot demands, however, were relegated to the long term – as well as being dependent on the good will of Turkey to fulfill its obligations.
- The return of the Turkish occupied land will take place in the period between three and a half months and three and a half years from the moment the solution is signed with no guarantees whatsoever that this shall be implemented. The Cypriot-Greek proposal of placing these areas under the control of the United Nations Peacekeeping Force in Cyprus and not the Turkish Army has been rejected.
- The Plan did not address the issue of the British Sovereign Base Areas (SBAs) on the island, although parts of the SBAs would be transferred to the governments of the two constituent states.
- The British were granted rights to unilaterally define the continental shelf and territorial waters along two base areas and to claim potential mineral rights. Under the 1959–1960 Zürich and London Agreements, Britain did not have such rights (see the 2nd annex to the Additional Protocol to the 1959 Treaty of Establishment).
- The plan absolved Turkey of all responsibility for its invasion of Cyprus and its murders, rapes, destruction of property and churches, looting and forcing approximately 200,000 Greek Cypriots from their homes and property. The Cyprus government filed applications to the European Commission on Human rights on 17 September 1974 and on 21 March 1975. The Commission issued its report on the charges made in the two applications on 10 July 1976. In it the Commission found Turkey guilty of violating the following articles of the European Convention on Human Rights:
1. Article 2 – by the killing of innocent civilians committed on a substantial scale;
2. Article 3 – by the rape of women of all ages from 12 to 71;
3. Article 3 – by inhuman treatment of prisoners and persons detained;
4. Article 5 – by deprivation of liberty with regard to detainees and missing persons – a continuing violation;
5. Article 8 – by displacement of persons creating more than 180,000 Greek Cypriot refugees, and be refusing to allow the refugees to return to their homes.
- The plan failed to provide payment by Turkey:
1. for the lives of innocent civilians killed by the Turkish army;
2. for the victims of rape by the Turkish army;
3. for the vast destruction of property and churches by the Turkish army; and
4. for the substantial looting by the Turkish army.
- The Plan subverted the property rights of the Greek Cypriots and other legal owners of property in the occupied area:
  - by prohibiting recourse to European courts on property issues;
  - by withdrawing all pending cases at the European Court of Human Rights and transferring them to local courts;
  - by allowing Turkish Cypriots and illegal mainland Turk settlers/colonists to keep Greek Cypriot homes and property they were illegally given following Turkey's invasion of Cyprus and not having to reimburse the rightful owners of the property for 30 years of illegal use;
  - by a highly complicated, ambiguous and uncertain regime for resolving property issues and which is based on the principle that real property owners can ultimately be forced to give up their property rights which would violate the European Convention on Human Rights and international law. The Greek Cypriot property owners would have to be reimbursed by the federal treasury which would be funded overwhelmingly by the Greek Cypriots, meaning that Greek Cypriots would be reimbursing themselves.
- The Plan would have the effect of protecting those British citizens who illegally bought Greek Cypriot property from settlers or persons who are not owners; in the occupied north of Cyprus. They would, in effect, not be held responsible for their illegal action.
- The cost of economic reunification would be borne by the Greek Cypriots. The reunification cost has been estimated to be close to $20b.
- Following the Annan 5 plan, the Greek Cypriots would not have been allowed to make up more than 6% of the population in any single village in the Turkish-controlled areas in the north thus they would have been prevented from setting up their own schools for their children and would not have even been able to give birth once this quota was reached.
- The agreement places time restrictions in the right of free, permanent installation of Greek Cypriots back to their homes and properties in them to be Turkish Cypriot State, which constitutes a deviation from the European Union practices. Those Greek Cypriot refugees that would return to their homes in regions under Turkish Cypriot administration would have no local civil rights, because the political representatives of Turkish Cypriot State would be elected only from Turkish Cypriots.
- The functional weaknesses of the Plan endanger, among other things, the smooth activity and participation of Cyprus, with one voice, in the European Union. While the Greek Cypriots have with many sacrifices achieved Cyprus accession to the European Union, the Greek Cypriots could very easily be led to the neutralization of the accession until the adoption of all necessary federal and regional legal measures or the loss of the benefits of the accession or the facing of obstacles in Cyprus participation in the Economic and Monetary Union and other European institutions.
- The economy of Cyprus would have been separate with the plan. There will be no common monetary policy, fiscal policy and no investments by Greek Cypriot businesses shall be allowed in the Turkish Cypriot constituent state.
- Many Greek-Cypriots felt that the demand that the Cyprus issue be resolved before Cyprus' entry to the EU was so that the reunification would not have to contain elements of European law which were incompatible with certain provisions in the Annan Plan. This was further backed up by many who demanded the EU accept all derogations even if they violate European Court Decisions, European law and UN Security Council Resolutions. Both Romano Prodi and Günter Verheugen repeatedly indicated that any such derogations should only be for a short period of time and should not violate any European regulations.

== See also ==
- Embargo against Northern Cyprus
- Two-state solution (Cyprus)
- 2015–2017 Cyprus talks
- 2004 Annan Plan Referendum
- Cypriot refugees
- German reunification
- Korean reunification
- United Ireland
- Loizidou v. Turkey
- Apostolides v Orams
- Greek Cypriots, et al. v. TRNC and HSBC Bank USA
- List of Middle East peace proposals
