= 2004 Cypriot Annan Plan referendums =

Referendum in Cyprus

- 24 April 2004
- Do you approve the Foundation Agreement with all its Annexes, as well as the constitution of the Greek Cypriot/Turkish Cypriot State and the provisions as to the laws to be in force, to bring into being a new state of affairs in which Cyprus joins the European Union united?
- Outcome: The Annan Plan, according to its own terms, became null and void.

Greek Cypriots
For	24.17%
Against	75.83%
Voter turnout: 89.18%

Turkish Cypriots
For	64.91%
Against	35.09%
Voter turnout: 87.00%

Total
For	33.30%
Against	66.70%
Voter turnout: 88.68%

A referendum on the Annan Plan was held in the Republic of Cyprus and the Turkish Republic of Northern Cyprus on 24 April 2004. The two communities were asked whether they approved of the fifth revision of the United Nations proposal for reuniting the island, which had been divided since 1974. While it was approved by 65% of Turkish Cypriots, it was rejected by 76% of Greek Cypriots. Turnout for the referendum was high at 89% among Greek Cypriots and 87% among Turkish Cypriots, which was taken as indicative of great interest in the issue on the part of the electorates.

== Background ==
The referendum had originally been planned for 21 April, until the UN planners realised it was the anniversary of the coup in Athens in 1967, which set off the chain of events that led to the Turkish invasion of the island in 1974.

== Campaign ==
=== Position of political parties ===
Choice	Cyprus		Northern Cyprus	
Yes	Democratic Rally	Liberal conservatism	Republican Turkish Party	Social democracy
Yes	United Democrats	Social liberalism	Peace and Democracy Movement	Social democracy
Yes			Communal Liberation Party	Social democracy
Yes			United Cyprus Party	Democratic socialism
Yes			New Cyprus Party	Democratic socialism
Yes			Socialist Party of Cyprus	Democratic socialism
No	Progressive Party of Working People	Communism	National Unity Party	National conservatism
No	Democratic Party	Centrism	Democratic Party	Conservatism
No	Movement for Social Democracy	Social democracy	Nationalist Justice Party	Idealism
No	New Horizons	Right-wing populism		
No	Fighting Democratic Movement	Conservatism		
No	Ecological and Environmental Movement	Green politics		
No	For Europe	National conservatism		

=== Republic of Cyprus ===
Political leaders in the Republic of Cyprus strongly opposed the plan. Tassos Papadopoulos, president of the Republic of Cyprus, spoke out against the plan in a speech broadcast live on television. Two days before the referendums, Cyprus's biggest party, Progressive Party of Working People, decided to reject the Annan Plan. Greek Prime Minister Kostas Karamanlis decided to maintain a "neutral" position over the plan, but opposition leader George Papandreou of PASOK urged Cypriots to vote in favour, also because the plan had been promoted by his political party while it was still in power and Papandreou had been the Foreign Minister at the time, and had claimed both communities were ready for "a final common agreement". Nevertheless, opinion polls conducted in the Republic of Cyprus over the entire period of the negotiations from start to finish had always shown around 80% opposition to the proposals. Greek Cypriots have not voted uniformly on the Annan Plan. Their voting behaviour was strongly depended on their partisanship and their location.

=== Turkish Republic of Northern Cyprus ===
Among Turkish Cypriots the plan was argued to be excessively pro-Greek, but most said they were willing to accept it as a means of ending their prolonged international isolation and exclusion from the wider European economy. However, it was opposed by their leadership, with the Turkish Cypriot President Rauf Denktaş actively advocating a no vote. However, his Prime Minister Mehmet Ali Talat favoured the plan's acceptance, while Turkish Prime Minister Recep Tayyip Erdoğan also supported it. Turkey saw a resolution of the Cyprus issue as being an essential first step to eventual Turkish membership of the EU as well as a way of defusing tensions with Greece.

The Grey Wolves (a Turkish right-wing nationalist group belonging to the MHP nationalist party) actively advocated a "no" vote. There were some limited riots caused by Grey Wolves activists against pro-ratification supporters during the pre-vote period, with at least 50 such activists arriving in Northern Cyprus during the pre-voting period. However, the referendum itself was carried out peacefully and deemed free and fair.

== Referendum question ==
The question put to the electorate of the two communities was:

Do you approve the Foundation Agreement with all its Annexes, as well as the constitution of the Greek Cypriot/Turkish Cypriot State and the provisions as to the laws to be in force, to bring into being a new state of affairs in which Cyprus joins the European Union united?

— Annex IX, Article 1.1

== Results ==
Choice	Greek Cypriots		Turkish Cypriots		Total voters	
Choice	Votes	%	Votes	%	Votes	%
For	99,976	24.17	77,646	64.91	177,622	33.30
Against	313,704	75.83	41,973	35.09	355,677	66.70
Invalid/blank votes	14,907	3.48	5,344	4.28	20,251	3.66
Total	428,587	100	124,963	100	553,550	100
Registered voters/turnout	480,564	89.18	143,636	87.00	624,200	88.68
Source: GreekNews, Election Guide

== Aftermath ==
Since the Greek Cypriot Community did not approve the Plan, and implementation of the Plan was dependent on its approval by both communities, the Annan Plan, according to its own terms, became null and void.

Should the Foundation Agreement not be approved at the separate simultaneous referenda, or any guarantor fail to sign the Treaty on matters related to the new state of affairs in Cyprus by 29 April 2004, it shall be null and void, and have no legal effect.

— Annex IX, Article 1.2

=== Participation issues ===
Greek Cypriots disputed the right of Turkish Cypriots who had immigrated from Turkey since the 1974 breakaway. Following the referendum, Greek Cypriot President Tassos Papadopoulos wrote to Kofi Annan, complaining that:

However, under the final Plan not only the entirety of settlers were to remain in Cyprus and the possibility for a permanent flow of settlers from Turkey was left open, but all of them were allowed to vote during the referendum. This was so, despite established international law and UN practice, and persistent repeated calls of our side to the contrary, which were utterly disregarded. The end result, is that once more the settlers have participated in formulating the will of Turkish Cypriots during the referendum of April 24, and this against every norm of international law and practice.

—

The British Foreign Affairs Select Committee noted that while the settler population did not "swing" the vote, "as illegal immigrants they should not have been allowed to vote at all".

=== Reaction ===
==== Greek Cypriots ====
The Republic of Cyprus' president, Tassos Papadopoulos, said that Greek Cypriots had rejected just the Annan plan and not all solutions to the Cyprus problem. "They are not turning their backs on their Turkish Cypriot compatriots," he said soon after the results were declared. "They have simply rejected this particular solution on offer."

==== Turkish Cypriots ====
Turkish Cypriot President Rauf Denktaş responded to the referendum outcome by saying that, with the Annan Plan rejected, his "no" campaign had reached its objective. He rejected calls for his immediate resignation, but announced the following month that he would not be standing for a fifth presidential term in 2005.

==== Greece, Turkey and the United Kingdom ====
There was varied reaction from Cyprus' Guarantor Powers, Greece, Turkey and the United Kingdom. Turkey's Prime Minister Recep Tayyip Erdoğan said that he believed the result spelled an end for Turkish Cypriot isolation, and that by rejecting the Annan Plan, "southern Cyprus (was) the loser". A spokesman for the Greek government stressed that efforts to reunite Cyprus should not be halted, pointing out that in the EU framework it is "in the interest of everyone to continue efforts to reconcile Greek Cypriots and Turkish Cypriots".

The British Foreign Secretary Jack Straw said, "We will respect the choice which Greek Cypriots have expressed today. But I hope that they will continue to reflect on whether this choice is the right one for them." The general international reaction to the result was similar to that of Britain: one of deep disappointment, particularly among those bodies that had worked on the Annan Plan and on EU accession arrangements.

==== European Union ====
The European Union had been counting on approval of the Annan Plan so that Cyprus would join it as a united island, and expressed disappointment at the Greek Cypriot rejection of the Plan. It had already agreed that the Republic of Cyprus would become a member regardless of the result of the referendum, and so on May 1, 2004, Cyprus joined the European Union together with nine other countries.

With regard to the Turkish Cypriots the European Union stated the following:

The whole of the island is in the EU. However, in the northern part of the island, in the areas in which the Government of Cyprus does not exercise effective control, EU legislation is suspended in line with Protocol 10 of the Accession Treaty 2003. The situation will change once a Cyprus settlement enters into force and it will then be possible for EU rules to apply over the whole of the island. However, the suspension does not affect the personal rights of Turkish Cypriots as EU citizens. They are citizens of a Member State, the Republic of Cyprus, even though they may live in the northern part of Cyprus, the areas not under government control.

—

Had the plan been ratified by both sides, Cyprus would have entered the EU as the United Republic of Cyprus.

==== Other international reaction ====
- United Nations Secretary-General Kofi Annan: "A unique and historic chance to resolve the Cyprus problem has been missed."
- European Commission: "The European Commission deeply regrets that the Greek Cypriot community did not approve the comprehensive settlement of the Cyprus problem, but it respects the democratic decision of the people."
- US State Department Spokesman Richard Boucher: "We are disappointed that a majority of Greek Cypriots voted against the settlement plan. Failure of the referendum in the Greek Cypriot community is a setback to the hopes of those on the island who voted for the settlement and to the international community."
- European Commissioner for Enlargement Günter Verheugen: "I feel cheated by the Greek Cypriot government... There is a shadow now over the accession of Cyprus. What we will seriously consider now is finding a way to end the economic isolation of the Turkish Cypriots."
- UN Special Envoy Álvaro de Soto: "This evening I'm biting my tongue."

== See also ==
- Embargo against Northern Cyprus
