= 2015–2017 Cyprus talks =

Attempted peace talks

Talks to resolve the Cyprus problem starting from 12 May 2015 to 7 July 2017, when the President of the Republic of Cyprus Nicos Anastasiades and President of Northern Cyprus Mustafa Akıncı met for the first time and restarted peace talks. The talk was brought to a halt when both sides failed to negotiate a deal.

== Start of talks ==
Hopes for a solution was raised with the election of Akıncı, a left-wing politician and long-standing advocate of inter-communal rapprochement, in the presidential election in Northern Cyprus in April 2014. He had defeated Derviş Eroğlu, a right-wing politician who had been less committed to the idea of solution and his election was welcomed by Anastasiades.

The first meeting between Akıncı and Anastasiades took place on 12 May 2015, where they agreed to hold talks within the framework of the joint declaration by Anastasiades and the previous Turkish Cypriot leader, Derviş Eroğlu. The leaders undertook joint activities, such as strolling through the line dividing the capital city, Nicosia, together, and spending time on both sides in May 2015. Furthermore, in May 2015, a number of confidence building measures were agreed upon, which included the abolishment of the requirement of filling of visa forms by Greek Cypriots when visiting Northern Cyprus and the handing of the locations of minefields in the north that had been planted by Greek Cypriots during the conflict by Anastasiades.

== Progress of the talks ==
By December 2015, the issues of governance, citizenship and Turkish settlers had been widely discussed. According to leaked documents published by Politis, it was agreed that the federation to be established would have the responsibility of foreign policy and international agreements, that it would have a senate composed of 20 Greek and 20 Turkish Cypriots, a lower house of parliament consisting of 36 Greek and 12 Turkish Cypriots, a Supreme Court with an equal number of judges from both communities (the disagreements on resolution of disagreements persisted, but it was agreed that a foreign judge would be recruited to solve disagreements with regards to constitutional law). The two constituent states of the federation would have their own parliaments. It was agreed that a property commission would be formed, but there remained large disagreements, territory was yet to be discussed and the issue of guarantees would only be discussed with the participation of the guarantors, Turkey, Greece and the UK. It was also leaked, and later confirmed by Anastasiades in July 2016, that the population ratio had been established as 78.5% to 21.5%, at 802,000 Greek Cypriots and 220,000 Turkish Cypriots, and that all citizens of Northern Cyprus, including settlers that had acquired citizenship, would obtain the citizenship of the new state and be allowed to stay. The leak also revealed that other, non-citizen settlers would be given work and residence permits, but not immediately citizenship. An issue was posed by the discrepancy between the Greek Cypriot demands regarding the four freedoms as delineated by EU law and the Turkish Cypriot demands on retaining a Turkish Cypriot majority in the Turkish Cypriot state. Steps to resolve this included the provision that even if a Greek Cypriot moved to the north, they would still vote in the elections of the Greek Cypriot state, except for municipal elections.

In November 2016, two rounds of talks were held in Mont Pèlerin, Switzerland, regarding the issue of territory. The talks broke down with no agreement on 22 November, with Akıncı blaming Greek Cypriots for their "maximalist demands" and the Greek Cypriot spokesperson blaming the Turkish Cypriots' position.

On 30 June 2017, UN said in a statement that Secretary General Antonio Guterres held "highly constructive" talks on Cyprus with key parties in Crans-Montana, enabling a clear vision of what could lead to a settlement.

On 7 July 2017, UN-sponsored talks held in the Swiss Alps for the previous 10 days were brought to a halt after negotiations broke down. Cyprus talks in Crans-Montana ended without a peace and reunification deal.

On 1 October 2017, former British Foreign Secretary Jack Straw stated that "[o]nly a partitioned island will bring the dispute between Turkish and Greek Cypriots to an end".

In late 2017, the Business Monitor International, part of the Fitch Group, downgraded its assessment of a new Cyprus unification deal from slim to extremely remote.

== See also ==
- Two-state solution (Cyprus), a solution proposed by Turkish and Turkish Cypriot governments after peace talks in Crans-Montana have failed
- Embargo against Northern Cyprus
