= Fighting Democratic Movement =

Political party

The Fighting Democratic Movement (Greek: Αγωνιστικό Δημοκρατικό Κίνημα, ΑΔΙΚ, ADIK) was a conservative and centrist political party in Cyprus.

In the 2001 parliamentary elections the party received 2% of the popular vote and won one of the 56 seats in parliament. In 2006 it lost parliamentary representation. In 2011, ADIK decided to become part of the centre party DIKO.
