= United Nations Security Council Resolution 355 =

UN Security Council Resolution 355
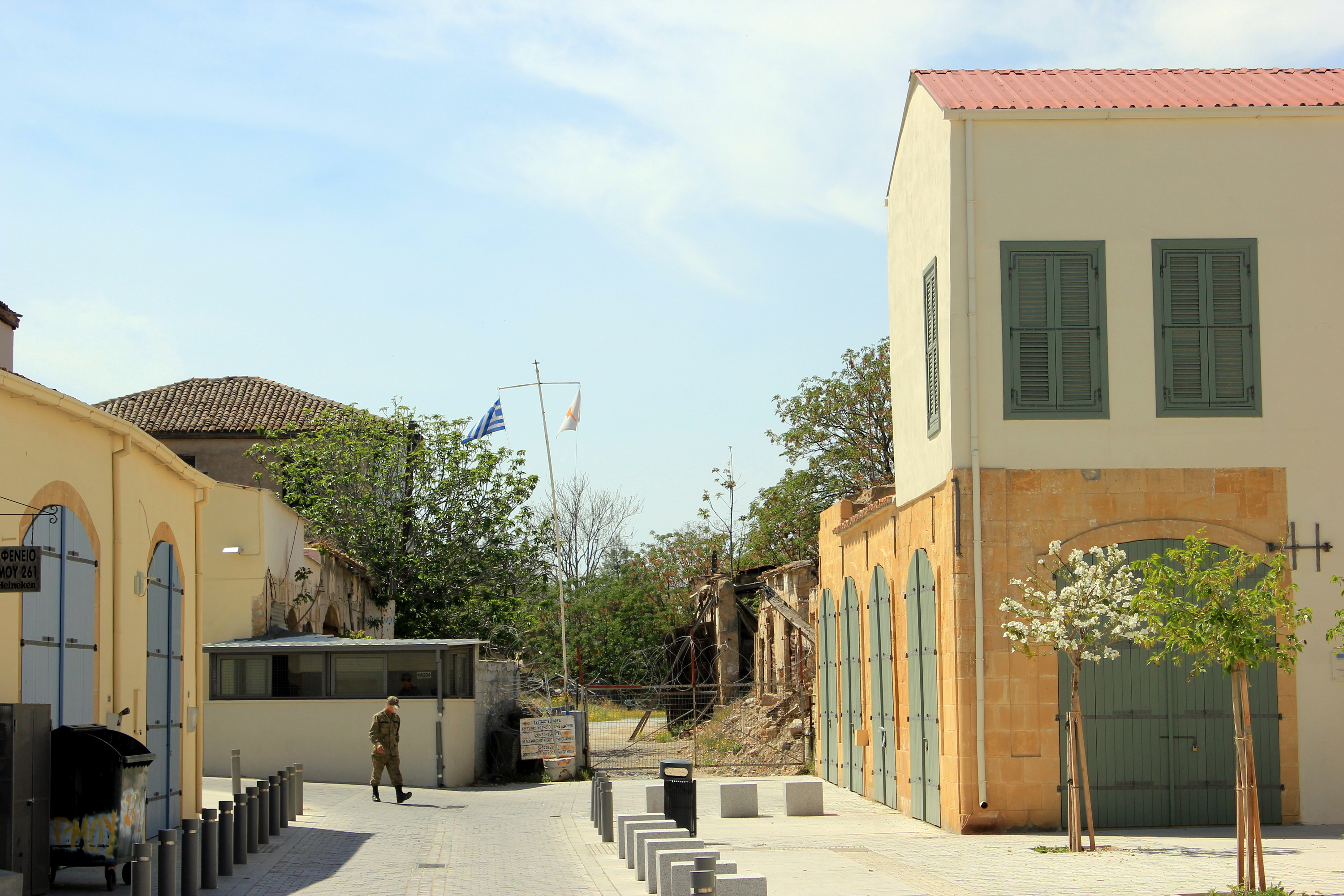
- Fence in the Nicosia border
- Date: 1 August 1974
- Meeting no.: 1,789
- Code: S/RES/355 (Document)
- Subject: Cyprus
- Voting summary: 13 voted for; None voted against; 2 abstained
- Result: Adopted

Security Council composition
- Permanent members: China; France; Soviet Union; United Kingdom; United States
- Non-permanent members: Australia; Austria; Byelorussian SSR; Cameroon; Costa Rica; Indonesia; Iraq; Kenya; Mauritania; Peru

United Nations Security Council Resolution 355, adopted on 1 August 1974, recalled its resolutions 186, 353 and 354, noted that all States have declared their respect for Cyprus' sovereignty, independence and territorial integrity and requested the Secretary-General take appropriate action with regard to a possible cease-fire and report back to the council. The resolution was looking to implement an end to the conflict sparked by the Turkish invasion of Cyprus.

Resolution 355 was passed with 13 votes to none; the Byelorussian Soviet Socialist Republic and Soviet Union abstained.

== See also ==
- Cyprus dispute
- List of United Nations Security Council Resolutions 301 to 400 (1971–1976)
