= United Nations Security Council Resolution 1250 =

UN Security Council Resolution 1250
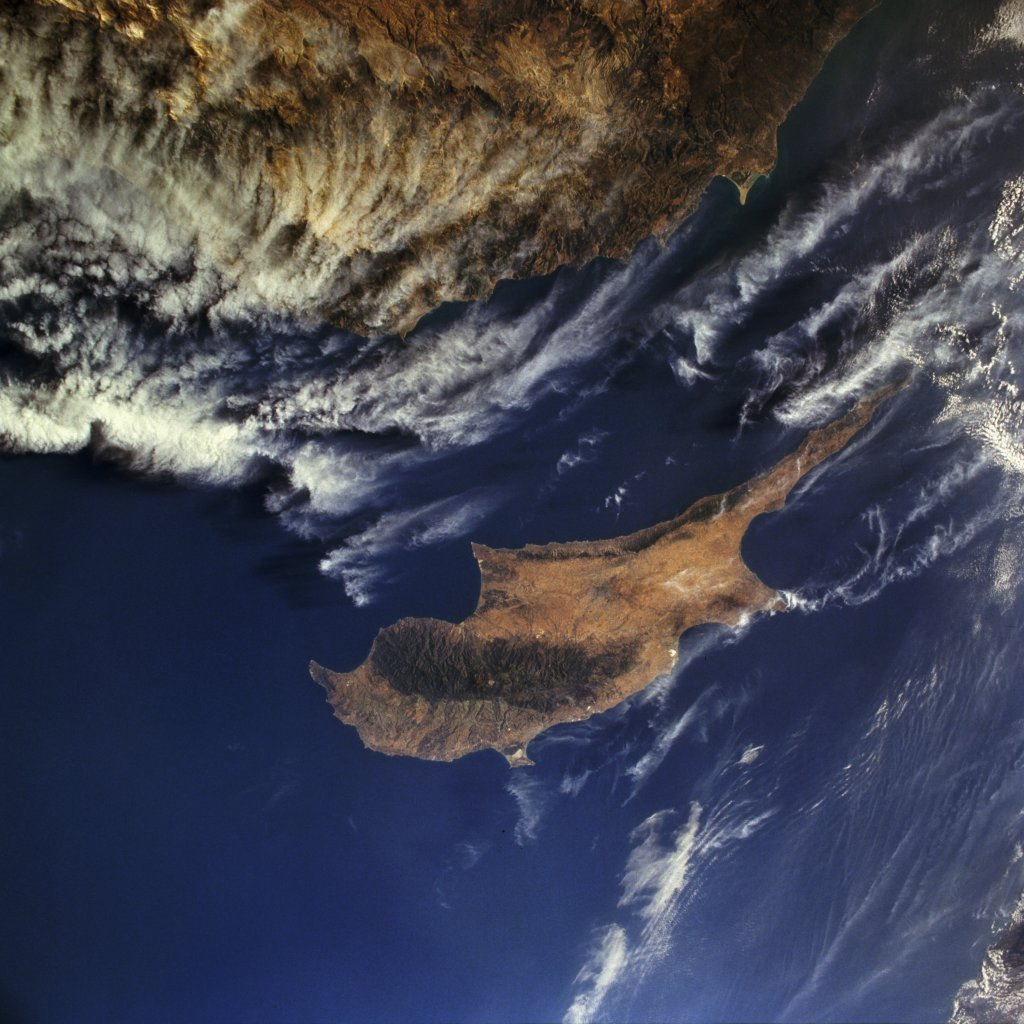
- Satellite view of the island of Cyprus
- Date: 29 June 1999
- Meeting no.: 4,018
- Code: S/RES/1250 (Document)
- Subject: The situation in Cyprus
- Voting summary: 15 voted for; None voted against; None abstained
- Result: Adopted

Security Council composition
- Permanent members: China; France; Russia; United Kingdom; United States
- Non-permanent members: Argentina; Bahrain; Brazil; Canada; Gabon; Gambia; Malaysia; Namibia; Netherlands; Slovenia

United Nations Security Council resolution 1250, adopted unanimously on 29 June 1999, after reaffirming all resolutions on the situation in Cyprus, particularly Resolution 1218 (1998), the Council addressed the Secretary-General Kofi Annan's mission of good offices in Cyprus.

The security council reiterated its concern at the lack of progress towards a political settlement of the Cyprus dispute. It stressed its full support for the mission of good offices of the secretary-general with the goal of reducing tension and promoting progress towards a resolution in Cyprus. Both the Republic of Cyprus and Northern Cyprus had concerns which would be addressed in the negotiations.

The resolution requested the secretary-general to invite the two leaders of the communities on Cyprus to negotiations in the autumn of 1999. The two leaders were urged to commit themselves to the following principles:

(a) no preconditions;
(b) all issues on the table;
(c) continue to negotiate until a settlement is reached;
(d) consideration of United Nations resolutions and treaties.

They were also required to create a positive climate on the island in the run-up to negotiations in autumn 1999. Finally, the secretary-general was requested to report to the council by 1 December 1999 concerning developments in Cyprus. Resolution 1251 adopted the same day extended the mandate of the United Nations Peacekeeping Force in Cyprus.

== See also ==
- Annan Plan for Cyprus
- Cyprus problem
- List of United Nations Security Council Resolutions 1201 to 1300 (1998–2000)
- Turkish invasion of Cyprus
