= 2014 Cyprus talks =

2014 talks to settle the Cyprus dispute

A joint declaration was made on 11 February 2014 at the start of renewed negotiations to settle the Cyprus dispute. The following talks between Nicos Anastasiades, President of Cyprus, and Derviş Eroğlu, President of Northern Cyprus, were stalled in October 2014.

== Background ==
Post-independence disputes between the Greek and Turkish communities in the Republic of Cyprus resulted, after the Turkish invasion of Cyprus in 1974, in the self-declaration of the Turkish Republic of Northern Cyprus. Attempts during the intervening forty years to resolve the division and re-unite Cyprus, most notably the Annan Plan between 2002 and 2004 had all failed, the Annan Plan doing so when, in parallel referendums in April 2004, the Turkish community had voted to accept but the Greek community had voted to reject it. Further negotiations took place after the Greek Cypriot presidential election of 2008 but these first ran into difficulty over disputes about the extent of the Republic of Cyprus's exclusive economic zone and oil exploration within it, and then collapsed over a legal case in a British court which supported Greek Cypriots' property rights within territory controlled by Northern Cyprus. Further meetings in 2010 and 2011 had no significant results and talks were suspended in 2012.

However, some things changed during 2012 and 2013. Gas was discovered in both Cypriot and neighbouring Israeli waters, but the simplest way of getting it to customers in Europe would be via a pipeline through Turkey. The banking collapse in 2013 in the Republic of Cyprus led to economic shrinkage and high unemployment, and reunification could be expected to speed economic recovery and growth. After a lapse of several years, America showed interest in working actively for a solution to the dispute. Nicos Anastasiades, elected President of the Republic of Cyprus in February 2013, had supported the Annan Plan.

The date proposed for renewing talks was October 2013. However, Anastasiades regarded agreement on a joint declaration as a precondition for talks, and agreement on the wording of the declaration was only achieved in February 2014.

== The Joint Declaration ==
On 11 February 2014, the leaders of Greek and Turkish Cypriot communities, Nicos Anastasiades and Derviş Eroğlu, respectively, revealed the following joint declaration:

1. The status quo is unacceptable and its prolongation will have negative consequences for the Greek Cypriots and Turkish Cypriots. The leaders affirmed that a settlement would have a positive impact on the entire region, while first and foremost benefiting Turkish Cypriots and Greek Cypriots, respecting democratic principles, human rights and fundamental freedoms, as well as each other's distinct identity and integrity and ensuring their common future in a united Cyprus within the European Union.
2. The leaders expressed their determination to resume structured negotiations in a results-oriented manner. All unresolved core issues will be on the table, and will be discussed interdependently. The leaders will aim to reach a settlement as soon as possible, and hold separate simultaneous referenda thereafter.
3. The settlement will be based on a bi-communal, bi-zonal federation with political equality, as set out in the relevant Security Council Resolutions and the High Level Agreements. The united Cyprus, as a member of the United Nations and of the European Union, shall have a single international legal personality and a single sovereignty, which is defined as the sovereignty which is enjoyed by all member States of the United Nations under the UN Charter and which emanates equally from Greek Cypriots and Turkish Cypriots. There will be a single united Cyprus citizenship, regulated by federal law. All citizens of the united Cyprus shall also be citizens of either the Greek-Cypriot constituent state or the Turkish-Cypriot constituent state. This status shall be internal and shall complement, and not substitute in any way, the united Cyprus citizenship.
  The powers of the federal government, and like matters that are clearly incidental to its specified powers, will be assigned by the constitution. The Federal constitution will also provide for the residual powers to be exercised by the constituent states. The constituent states will exercise fully and irrevocably all their powers, free from encroachment by the federal government. The federal laws will not encroach upon constituent state laws, within the constituent states' area of competences, and the constituent states' laws will not encroach upon the federal laws within the federal government's competences. Any dispute in respect thereof will be adjudicated finally by the Federal Supreme Court. Neither side may claim authority or jurisdiction over the other.
4. The united Cyprus federation shall result from the settlement following the settlement's approval by separate simultaneous referenda. The Federal constitution shall prescribe that the united Cyprus federation shall be composed of two constituent states of equal status. The bi-zonal, bi-communal nature of the federation and the principles upon which the EU is founded will be safeguarded and respected throughout the island. The Federal constitution shall be the supreme law of the land and will be binding on all the federation's authorities and on the constituent states. Union in whole or in part with any other country or any form of partition or secession or any other unilateral change to the state of affairs will be prohibited.
5. The negotiations are based on the principle that nothing is agreed until everything is agreed.
6. The appointed representatives are fully empowered to discuss any issue at any time and should enjoy parallel access to all stakeholders and interested parties in the process, as needed. The leaders of the two communities will meet as often as needed. They retain the ultimate decision making power. Only an agreement freely reached by the leaders may be put to separate simultaneous referenda. Any kind of arbitration is excluded.
7. The sides will seek to create a positive atmosphere to ensure the talks succeed. They commit to avoiding blame games or other negative public comments on the negotiations. They also commit to efforts to implement confidence building measures that will provide a dynamic impetus to the prospect for a united Cyprus.

=== Reactions to the Joint Declaration ===
The governments of both Greece and Turkey expressed their support for renewed peace talks. The declaration was also welcomed by the European Union.

On 13 February 2014, Archbishop Chrysostomos lent Anastasiades his backing on the Joint Declaration.

On 14 February 2014, the Greek Cypriot negotiator Andreas Mavroyiannis and Turkish Cypriot negotiator Kudret Ozersay held their first meeting and agreed to visit Greece and Turkey respectively.

Reactions among the Greek Cypriot political parties were mixed. The opposition AKEL party declared its support for the declaration. However, Nicolas Papadopoulos, the leader of DIKO, the main partner to Anastasiades' party DISY in the governing coalition, opposed the declaration, and DIKO's executive committee voted on 21 February to recommend to the party's central committee that the party withdraw from the coalition from 4 March. On 27 February, DIKO decided to leave the coalition government, with the rationale that the Joint Declaration conceded separate sovereignty to Turkish Cypriots.

== End of the talks ==
In October 2014, the talks stalled as a result of a crisis ensuing from Turkey's sending of a warship to the Republic of Cyprus-controlled part of the Cypriot waters, as a part of a crisis over the exploration of offshore natural gas reserves. Anastasiades refused to attend the meeting on 9 October 2014, and talks did not resume until May 2015, after the election of Mustafa Akıncı as the Turkish Cypriot president in April 2015.
