= List of members of the European Parliament for Cyprus, 2004 =

This is the list of the 6 appointed members of the European Parliament for Cyprus from 1 May 2004 (following Cyprus' accession to the European Union) until 1 July 2004 (when the newly elected MEPs, assumed their duties following the first European Parliament Elections held in Cyprus on 13 June 2004).

== List ==
Name	National Party	EP Group
Panayotis Demetriou	Democratic Rally	EPP
Lefteris Christoforou	Democratic Rally	EPP
Doros Christodoulides	Progressive Party of Working People	EUL–NGL
Eleni Mavrou	Progressive Party of Working People	EUL–NGL
Marios Matsakis	Democratic Party	ELDR
Giorgos Varnava	Movement for Social Democracy	PES
