= Greek Cypriot nationalism =

Greek Cypriot ideology

Greek Cypriot nationalism, also known as Cypriot Hellenism, is a form of ethnic nationalism emphasising the Greekness of the Cypriot nation. It is not the same as Greek nationalism, the main goal of which is the integration of Cyprus into Greece—a process known as enosis. Having abandoned the idea of enosis, Greek Cypriot nationalists now aim to establish a Greek Cypriot-controlled state with close relations to Greece, which they see as their "motherland". Variants of Greek Cypriot nationalism have been espoused across Cyprus' political spectrum by the centre-left Movement for Social Democracy, the centre-right Democratic Party and Democratic Rally, and the right-wing New Horizons, as well as the Church of Cyprus.

The Turkish invasion of Cyprus in 1974 led to an initial marginalisation of Greek Cypriot nationalism and the consequent rise of Cypriotism, in opposition to traditional Greek nationalism; however, the 1981 election of Andreas Papandreou as Prime Minister of Greece with his policies of "nationalising" the Cyprus problem and his February 1982 visit to Cyprus led to a renewal of Greek Cypriot nationalism. In November 1993, Papandreou and President of Cyprus Glafcos Clerides announced the merging of Greek and Cypriot foreign and defense policies under a new "Joint Defense Space Doctrine", and Cyprus became a member of the European Union in 2004, which was seen as the best possible alternative to full-blown enosis. Opponents of the move included Turkish Cypriot leader Rauf Denktaş, who called it "enosis through the back door".

Greek Cypriot nationalism and Cypriotism contrasts, with opposing views on the causes and solutions for the Cyprus dispute, which correspond to right–left political opposition. The slogan for Greek Cypriot nationalism is "Cyprus is Greek", while Cypriotism's slogan is "Cyprus belongs to its people".

== History ==
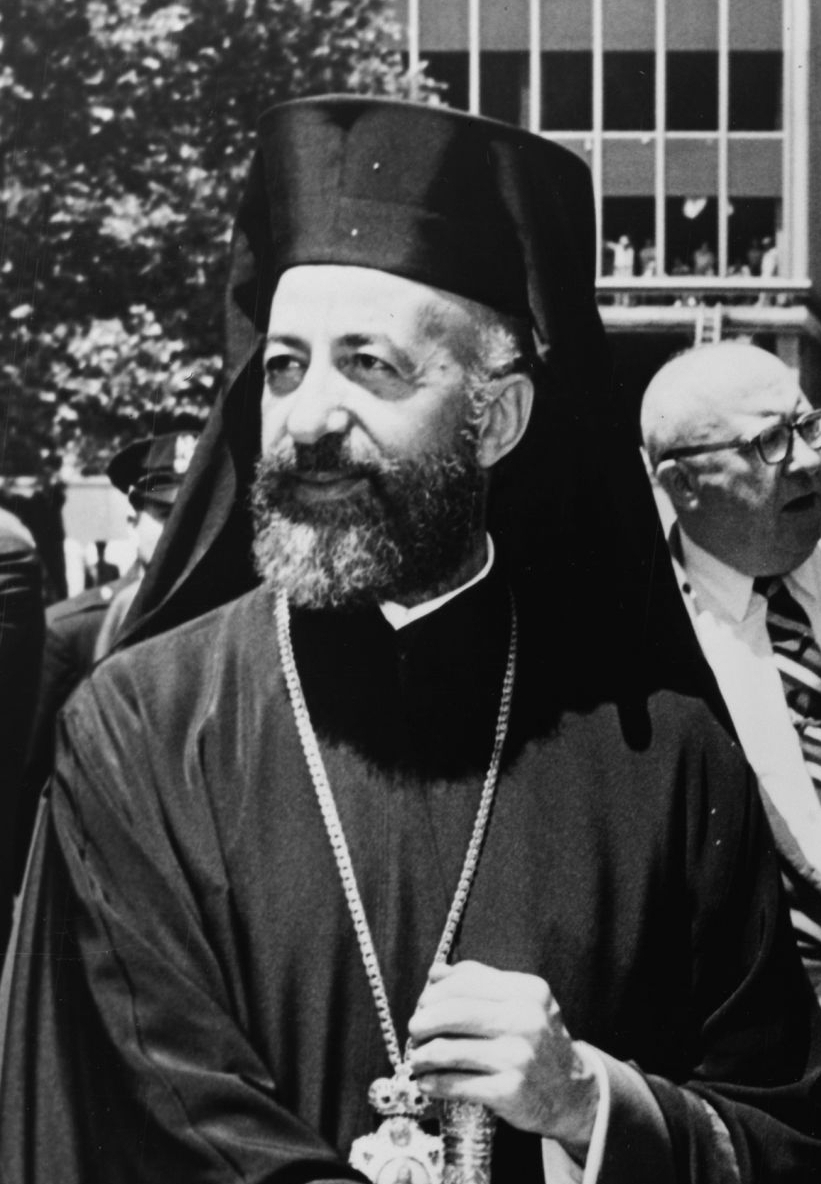
Archbishop Makarios III of Cyprus.

The Ottoman Empire ceded administration of Cyprus to the United Kingdom with the secret Cyprus Convention (1878). During World War I, the British formally annexed Cyprus as a crown colony. The 1950 referendum on unification with Greece, organized by the Orthodox Church, with only Greek Cypriot vote eligibility, ended with 96% approval. Greece appealed to the UN in 1954 to apply the right for self-determination on Cyprus. The Cypriot intercommunal violence led UN peacekeeping establishment on the island. The London-Zürich Agreements led to the independence of Cyprus, proclaimed on 16 August 1960. Several coups were staged by Orthodox bishops against Makarios III in March 1972 to July 1973.

The 1974 Cypriot coup d'état, staged by the Cypriot National Guard and Greek military junta, was successful, but short-lived, as it sparked the Turkish invasion of Cyprus (1974) that led to the fall of the junta and the Turkish occupation of 36.2% of Cyprus' territory. In 1983, the "Turkish Republic of Northern Cyprus" was unilaterally declared, but has so far failed to achieve international recognition (it is recognised only by Turkey), and has been under a severe international embargo.

== Political parties ==
Active

- Democratic Rally (DISY), centre-right, strongly pro-European and Atlanticist party that includes both Greek-Cypriot nationalist as well as moderate factions that supported the Annan Plan of 2004, 17/56 seats
- Democratic Party (DIKO), centrist, founded in 1976, 9/56 seats
- Movement for Social Democracy (EDEK), left-wing in economic theory and in most social policies but nationalist and hard-line in the Cyprus issue, founded in 1969, 4/56 seats
- National Popular Front (ELAM), founded in 2008, 4/56 seats (also strongly Greek nationalist and pro-Enosis)
- Movement of Ecologists – Citizens' Cooperation (KOSP), founded in 1996, 3/56 seats
- Solidarity Movement, Nationalist and soft eurosceptic, founded in 2016, 0/56 seats

Defunct

- Patriotic Front, active 1959–69, split into United Party, Progressive Front, Progressive Party and Democratic National Party
- Democratic National Party, active 1968–77, merged into Democratic Rally
- United Party, active 1969–76, split from Democratic Rally and Democratic Party
- Progressive Front, active 1970–76, merged into Democratic Rally
- Union of the Centre, active 1980–85, merged into Democratic Party and was led by Tassos Papadopoulos
- New Horizons, active 1996–2005, merged into European Party
- Fighting Democratic Movement, active 1998–2011, split from Democratic Party and merged back into Democratic Party
- Eurodemocratic Renewal Party, active 1998–c. 2004, split from Democratic Party and merged back into Democratic Party
- European Democracy, active 2004–2008, merged into European Party
- European Party, active 2005–15, merged into Solidarity Movement
- Citizens' Alliance, active 2013–21

== See also ==
- Cypriot nationalism
- Turkish Cypriot nationalism
- History of Cyprus since 1878
- Cyprus dispute
- Greek nationalism
- Turkish invasion of Cyprus

== Sources ==
- Hay, Colin; Menon, Anand (18 January 2007). European Politics. OUP Oxford. pp. 125–. ISBN 978-0-19-928428-3.
- Madianou, Mirca (12 November 2012). Mediating the Nation. Routledge. pp. 40–. ISBN 978-1-136-61105-6.
- Alecou, Alexios (16 June 2016). Communism and Nationalism in Postwar Cyprus, 1945-1955: Politics and Ideologies Under British Rule. Springer. pp. 84–. ISBN 978-3-319-29209-0.
- Borowiec, Andrew (2000). Cyprus: A Troubled Island. Greenwood Publishing Group. pp. 30–. ISBN 978-0-275-96533-4.
