= 1998 Cypriot presidential election =

- 8 February 1998 (first round); 15 February 1998 (second round)
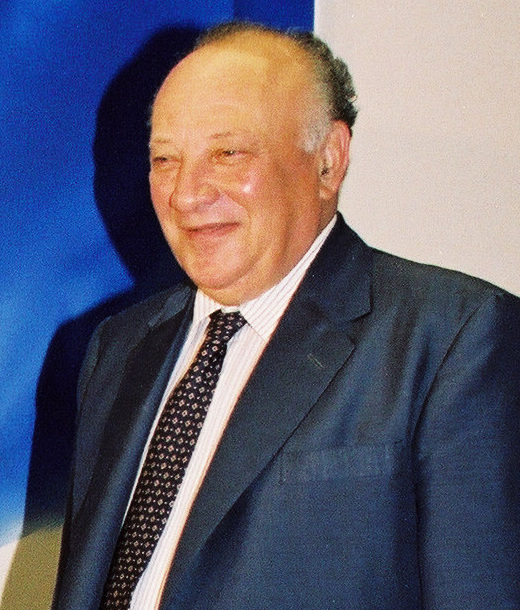

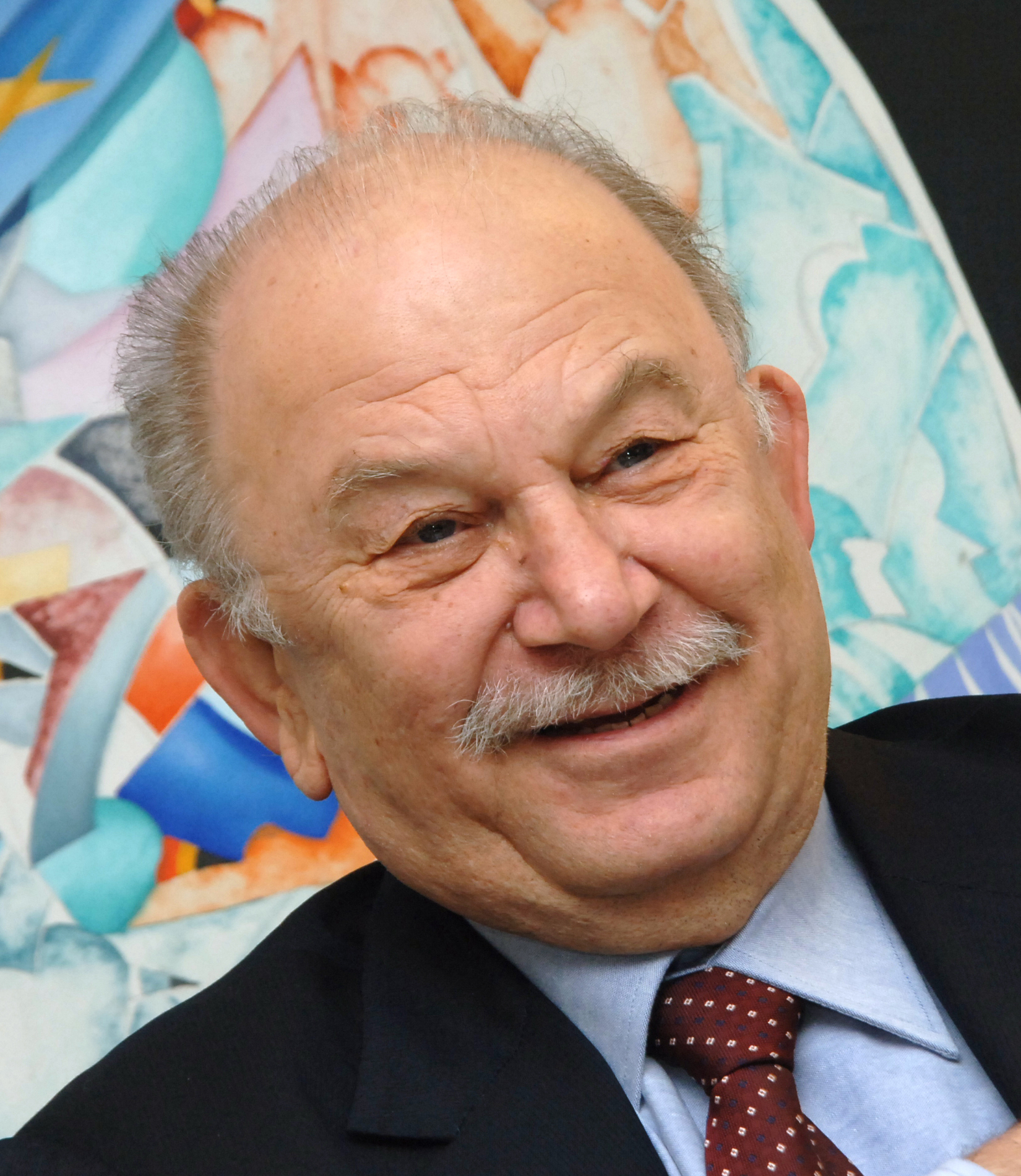
Candidate	Glafcos Clerides	Georgios Iacovou
Party	DISY	Independent
Popular vote	206,879	200,222
Percentage	50.82%	49.18%
President before election
Glafcos Clerides
DISY
Elected President
Glafcos Clerides
DISY

Presidential elections were held in Cyprus on 8 February 1998, with a second round on 15 February. The result was a victory for Glafcos Clerides of the Democratic Rally after he finished as runner-up behind Georgios Iacovou (who was supported by AKEL and the Democratic Party) in the first round. Voter turnout was 92% in the first round and 93% in the second.

== Results ==
Candidate	Party	First round		Second round	
Candidate	Party	Votes	%	Votes	%
Georgios Iacovou	Independent	160,918	40.61	200,222	49.18
Glafcos Clerides	Democratic Rally	158,763	40.06	206,879	50.82
Vassos Lyssarides	Movement for Social Democracy	41,978	10.59		
Alexis Galanos	Independent	16,003	4.04		
George Vassiliou	United Democrats	11,908	3.00		
Nicolas Koutsou	New Horizons	3,625	0.91		
Nicos A. Rolandis		3,104	0.78		
Total		396,299	100.00	407,101	100.00
Valid votes		396,299	96.66	407,101	97.53
Invalid/blank votes		13,680	3.34	10,305	2.47
Total votes		409,979	100.00	417,406	100.00
Registered voters/turnout		446,976	91.72	447,046	93.37
Source: Nohlen & Stöver
