= 2006 Cypriot legislative election =

- 21 May 2006

56 of the 80 seats in the House of Representatives
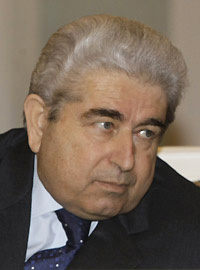

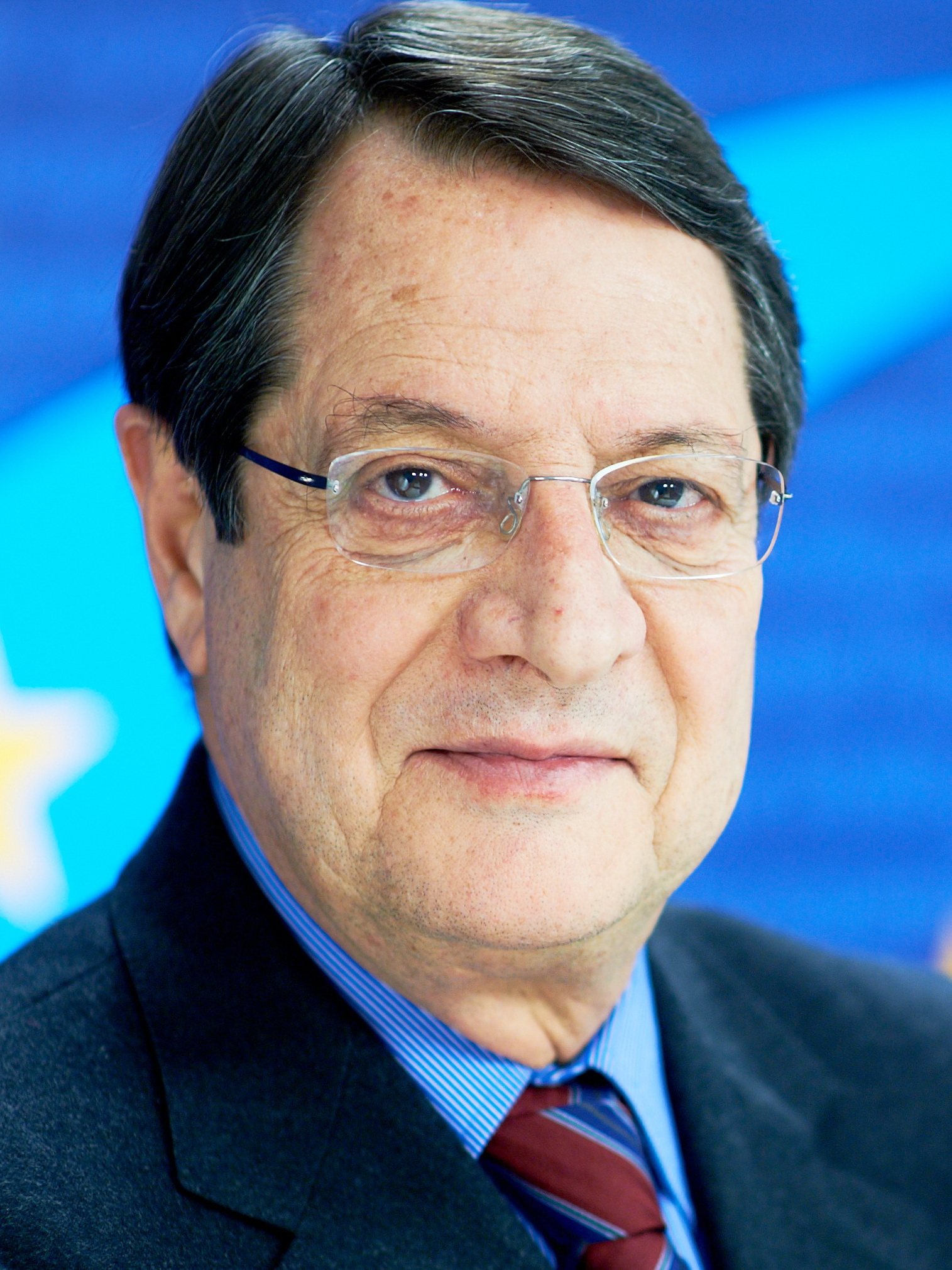

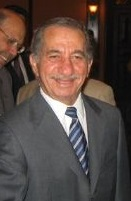

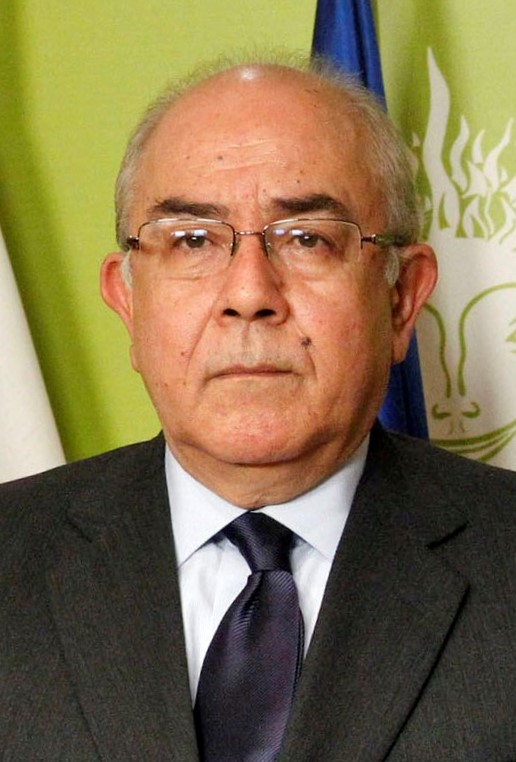

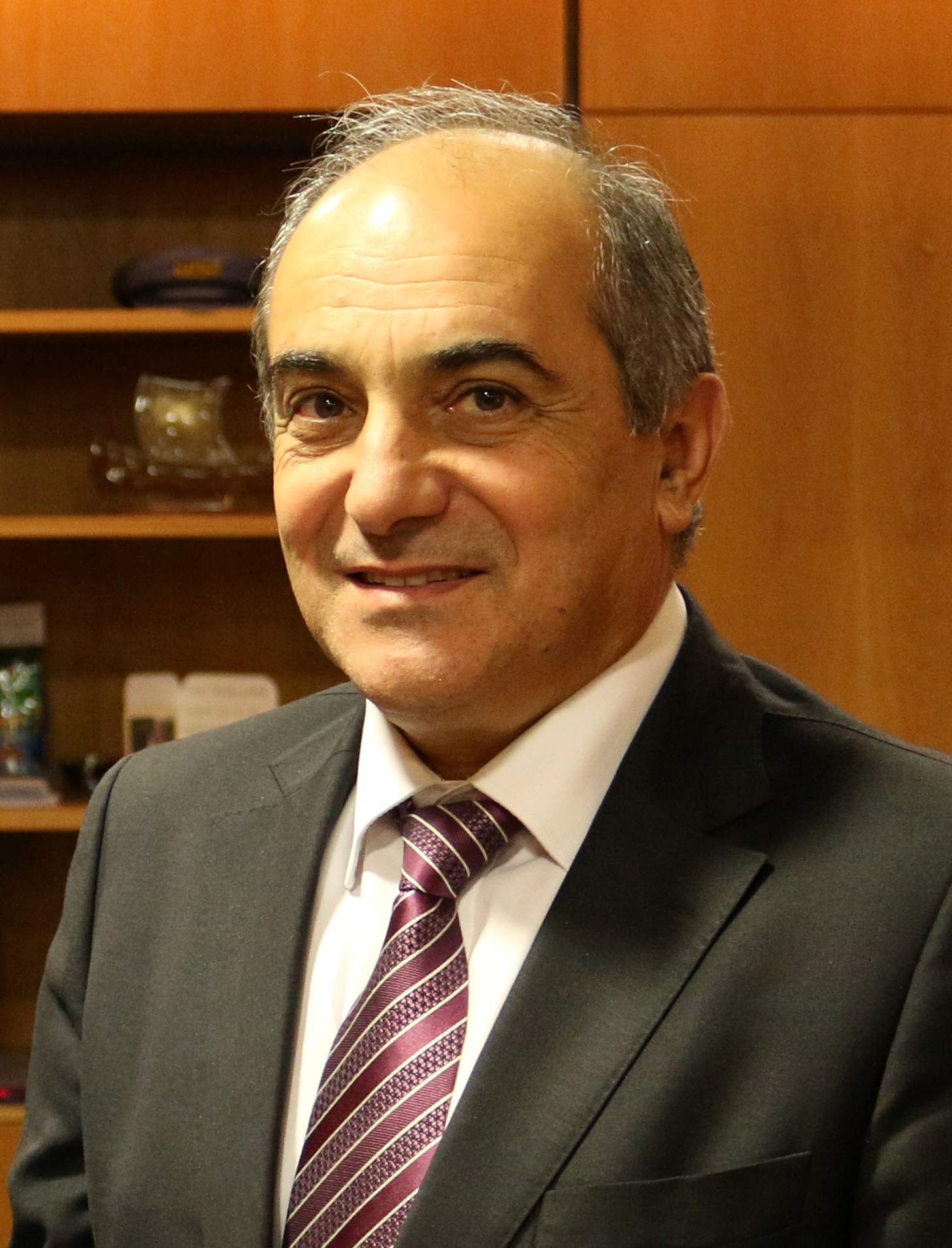

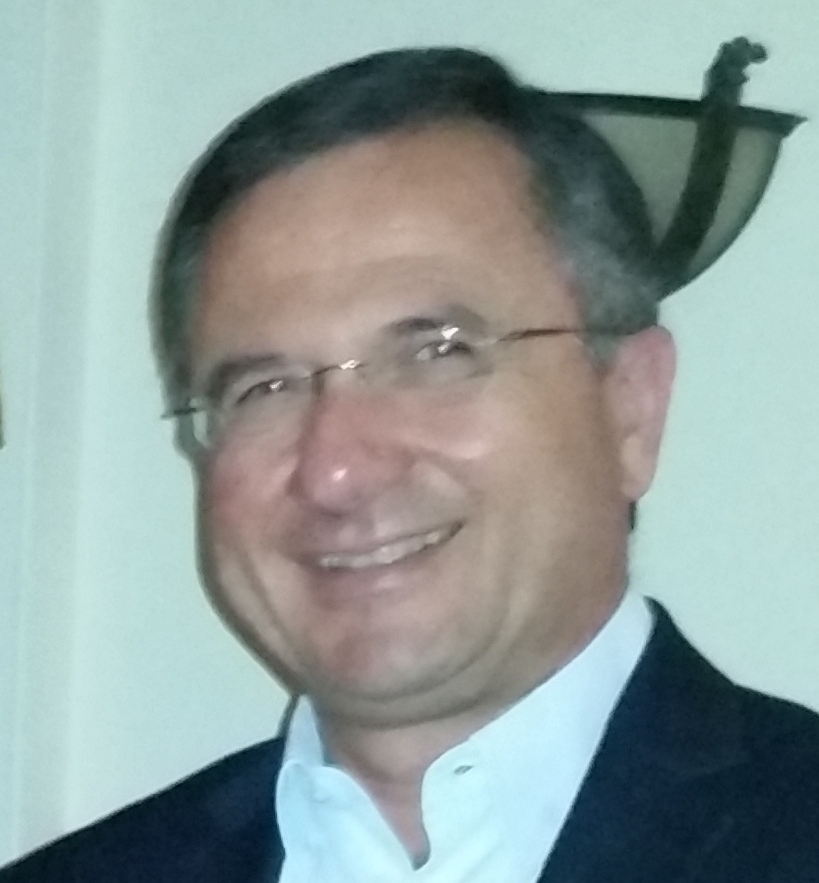
	First party	Second party	Third party
Leader	Demetris Christofias	Nicos Anastasiades	Tassos Papadopoulos
Party	AKEL	DISY	DIKO
Last election	34.7%, 20 seats	34.0%, 19 seats	14.8%, 9 seats
Seats won	18	18	11
Seat change	▼2	▼1	▲2
Popular vote	131,066	127,776	75,458
Percentage	31.1%	30.3%	17.9%
Swing	▼3.6pp	▼3.7pp	▲3.1pp
	Fourth party	Fifth party	Sixth party
Leader	Yiannakis Omirou	Demetris Syllouris	George Perdikes
Party	EDEK	European Party	Greens
Last election	6.5%, 4 seats	3.0%, 1 seat (Note: As New Horizons)	2.0%, 1 seat
Seats won	5	3	1
Seat change	▲1	▲2	Steady
Popular vote	37,533	24,196	8,193
Percentage	8.9%	5.8%	2.0%
Swing	▲2.4pp	▲2.8pp	0.0pp

Parliamentary elections were held in Cyprus on 21 May 2006. AKEL and the Democratic Rally both won 18 of the 56 seats. Voter turnout was 89.0%.

== Results ==
Party	Votes	%	Seats	+/–
Progressive Party of Working People	131,066	31.13	18	–2
Democratic Rally	127,776	30.34	18	–1
Democratic Party	75,458	17.92	11	+2
Movement for Social Democracy	37,533	8.91	5	+1
European Party	24,196	5.75	3	+2
Ecological and Environmental Movement	8,193	1.95	1	0
United Democrats	6,567	1.56	0	–1
Free Citizens Movement	5,157	1.22	0	New
European Democracy	1,844	0.44	0	New
Political Hunting Movement	1,112	0.26	0	New
LASOK	981	0.23	0	New
Independents	1,204	0.29	0	0
Total	421,087	100.00	56	0
Valid votes	421,087	94.43		
Invalid/blank votes	24,828	5.57		
Total votes	445,915	100.00		
Registered voters/turnout	501,024	89.00		
Source: MOI
