= List of members of the European Parliament for Cyprus, 2004–2009 =

This is a list of the 6 members of the European Parliament for Cyprus in the 2004 to 2009 session.

== List ==
Name	National party	EP Group
Adamos Adamou	Progressive Party of Working People	EUN–NGL
Panayiotis Demetriou	Democratic Rally	EPP–ED
Ioannis Kasoulides	Democratic Rally	EPP–ED
Marios Matsakis	Democratic Party	ALDE
Yiannakis Matsis	For Europe	EPP–ED
Kyriacos Triantaphyllides	Progressive Party of Working People	EUN–NGL

=== Party representation ===
National party	EP Group	Seats	±
Democratic Rally	EPP	2 / 6	
Progressive Party of Working People	EUL–NGL	2 / 6	
Democratic Party	S&D	1 / 6	
For Europe	EPP–ED	1 / 6	
