= 1983 Cypriot presidential election =

- 13 February 1983
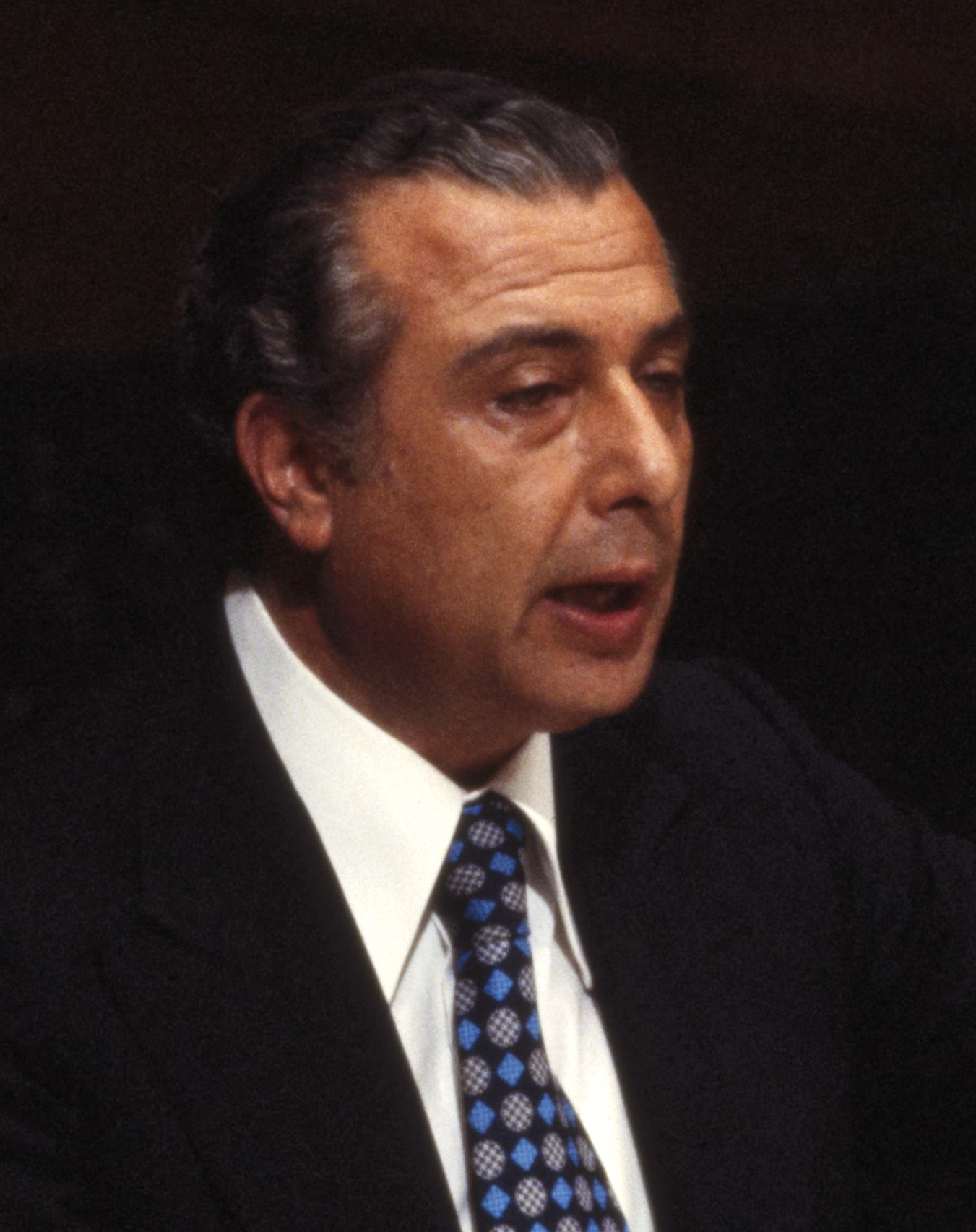

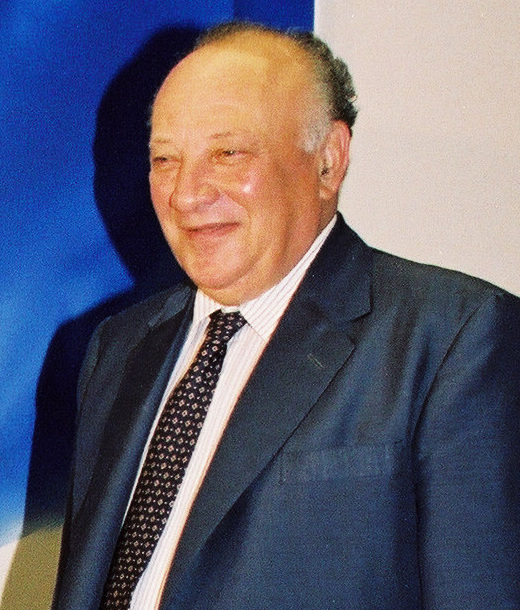

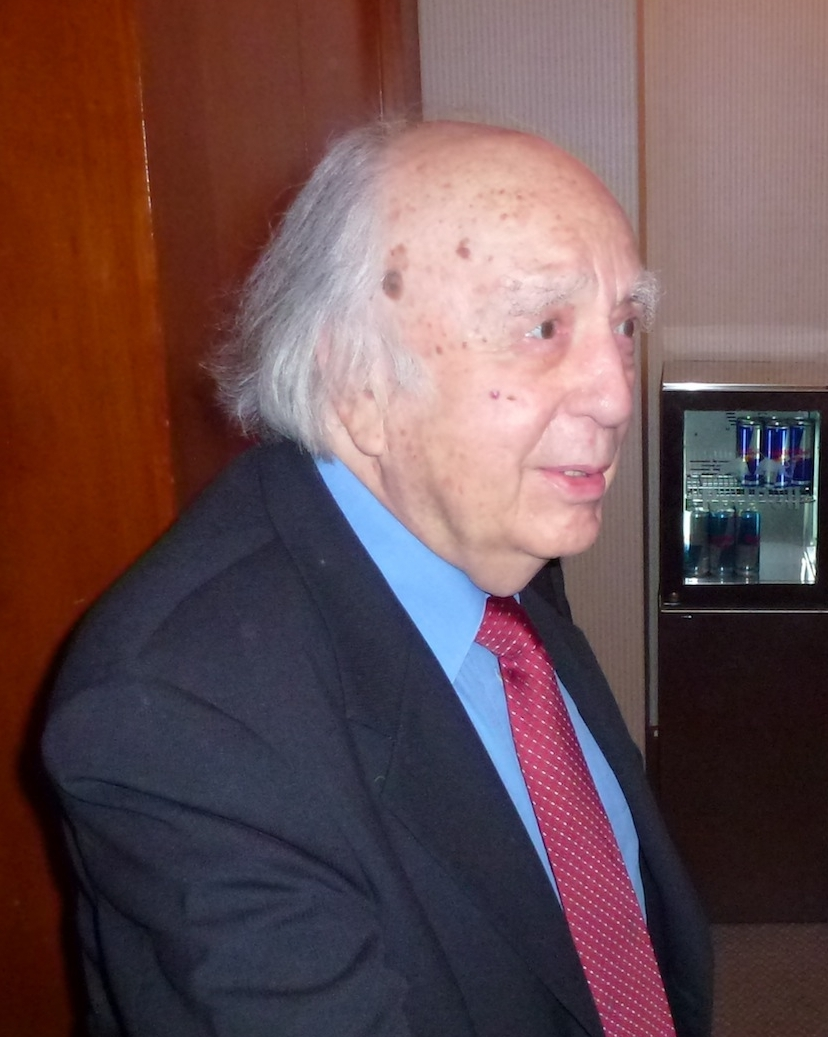
Candidate	Spyros Kyprianou	Glafcos Clerides	Vassos Lyssarides
Party	DIKO–AKEL	DISY	EDEK
Popular vote	173,791	104,294	29,307
Percentage	56.54%	33.93%	9.53%
- Results by district
President before election
Spyros Kyprianou
DIKO–AKEL
Elected President
Spyros Kyprianou
DIKO–AKEL

Presidential elections were held in Cyprus on 13 February 1983. The result was a victory for Spyros Kyprianou of the Democratic Party (and also supported by AKEL), who received 56.5% of the vote. Voter turnout was 95.0%.

== Results ==
Candidate	Party	Votes	%
Spyros Kyprianou	Democratic Party–AKEL	173,791	56.54
Glafcos Clerides	Democratic Rally	104,294	33.93
Vassos Lyssarides	Movement for Social Democracy	29,307	9.53
Total		307,392	100.00
Valid votes		307,392	98.87
Invalid/blank votes		3,511	1.13
Total votes		310,903	100.00
Registered voters/turnout		327,184	95.02
Source: Nohlen & Stöver
