= 2009 European Parliament election in Cyprus =

← 2004	6 June 2009	2014 →

6 seats in the European Parliament
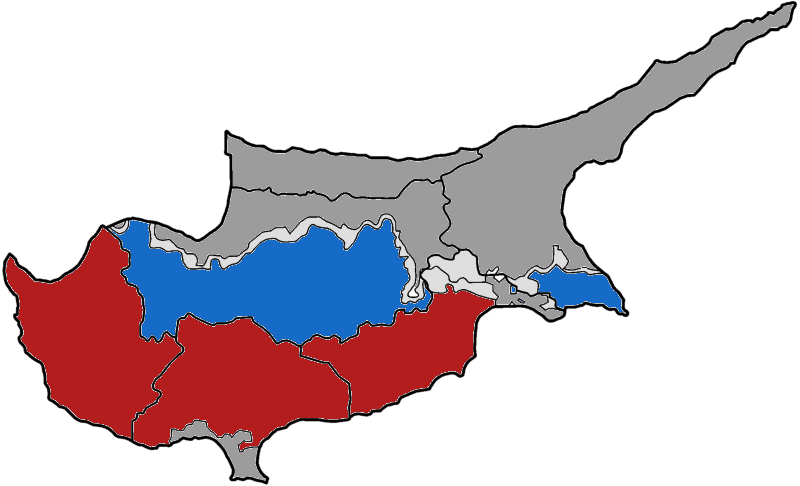
- Largest party by district

An election was held on 6 June 2009 for Members of the European Parliament from Cyprus.

== Results ==
Party	Votes	%	Seats	+/–
Democratic Rally	109,209	35.65	2	0
Progressive Party of Working People	106,922	34.90	2	0
Democratic Party	37,625	12.28	1	0
Movement for Social Democracy	30,169	9.85	1	1
European Party	12,630	4.12	0	–1
Ecological and Environmental Movement	4,602	1.50	0	0
Cyprus Reconstruction Movement	1,139	0.37	0	New
ELAM	663	0.22	0	New
Independents	3,366	1.10	0	0
Total	306,325	100.00	6	0
Valid votes	306,325	98.03		
Invalid/blank votes	6,154	1.97		
Total votes	312,479	100.00		
Registered voters/turnout	526,060	59.40		
Source: MOI
