= Democratic Rally =

Christian-democratic and liberal-conservative political party in Cyprus

Democratic Rally Δημοκρατικός Συναγερμός Demokratik Seferberlik
- Abbreviation: DISY
- President: Annita Demetriou
- Deputy President: Efthimios Diplaros
- Vice Presidents: Savia Orfanidou; Georgios Karoullas; Yiannis Karousos
- Founder: Glafcos Clerides
- Founded: 4 July 1976; 49 years ago
- Preceded by: EK; DEK; PP
- Headquarters: Nicosia, Cyprus
- Think tank: ONEDISY
- Student wing: PROTOPORIA
- Youth wing: NEDISY (Democratic Rally Youth)
- Women's wing: GODISY
- Membership (2022): 50,660
- Ideology: Christian democracy; Liberal conservatism; Pro-Europeanism
- Political position: Centre-right to right-wing
- European affiliation: European People's Party
- European Parliament group: European People's Party Group
- International affiliation: Centrist Democrat International; International Democracy Union
- Colours: Blue
- House of Representatives: 17 / 56
- European Parliament: 2 / 6
- Municipal Councils: 140 / 443

Website
- disy.org.cy

The Democratic Rally (Greek: Δημοκρατικός Συναγερμός, romanized: Dimokratikós Sinagermós, ΔΗΣΥ, DISY) is a Christian democratic and liberal-conservative political party in Cyprus led by Annita Demetriou. The party was founded on 4 July 1976 by veteran politician Glafcos Clerides. Two leaders of the party have served as presidents of Cyprus, Clerides from 1993 until 2003 and Nicos Anastasiades from 2013 to 2023.

From 11 March 2023, the leader of the party is Annita Demetriou, who also serves as the president of the House of Representatives since June 2021.

== Background ==
DISY's base is fairly political diverse, ranging from hard-line Greek Cypriot nationalists and anti-communists to humanist liberals with post-materialist and post-modern values who advocate human rights. DISY's platform focuses on free enterprise economic policies, lower direct taxes, higher indirect taxes, economic development, opposing government deficits, investments in infrastructure, and a practical solution to the Cyprus dispute, although the party base is traditionally more hawkish and hard-line than the party leadership. It is the most explicitly pro-NATO of Cyprus's parties, and draws its support from middle-class professionals, businessmen, and white-collar employees.

On social issues, the party is considered to be moderate but with factions aligned towards more traditionalist values. In 2015, when the majority of the party's deputies voted in favour of allowing same-sex couples to enter cohabitation agreements, the more conservative faction of the party voted against the bill.

== History ==
=== Origins ===
The Democratic Rally (DISY) emerged from the split of the right-wing "Eniaion" into two opposing parties. Following the Turkish invasion and the 1974 coup d'état, internal conflicts within Eniaion led to the creation of DISY, led by Glafkos Clerides, and DIKO, led by Spyros Kyprianou. The newly established DISY was a pro-Western and anti-communist party, that brought together the moderate centre-right and former EOKA B sympathisers, both of whom opposed the return of Archbishop Makarios to the presidency. Founded in 1976, DISY's logo is the Nike of Paionios.

=== 1976–1981: Defeat by the Democratic Powers alliance ===
In the 1976 legislative election, the DISY formed an alliance with the far-right Democratic National Party (DEK) to oppose the ruling president, Makarios III. This coalition ran against the governing parties, which had united under the alliance named "Democratic Powers" in support of the president.

The Democratic Powers alliance, composed of DIKO, AKEL, and EDEK, won 34 out of the 35 seats. The independent candidate, Tassos Papadopoulos, secured the remaining seat. The DISY-DEK alliance failed to win any seats, leaving them without representation in the parliament.

=== 1981–1993: Electoral breakthrough ===
Five years after its electoral defeat, in the 1981 legislative election, DISY secured 12 seats in the House of Representatives, establishing itself as the official opposition to Spyros Kyprianou's government. The party received 31.8% of the popular vote, winning the same number of seats as AKEL, which garnered 32.7% and finished first. This election marked the first time that former EOKA fighters entered the Cypriot parliament.

The Democratic Rally participated in presidential elections for the first time in 1983, supporting its president and founder, Glafcos Clerides. Clerides faced the incumbent president, Kyprianou, and the leader of EDEK, Vassos Lyssarides. Kyprianou was supported by the alliance of DIKO and AKEL. Clerides finished second with 33.9% of the vote and lost in the first round, with Kyprianou securing victory with 56.4% of the vote.

The electoral power of the Democratic Rally continued to grow, and in the 1985 legislative election, it finished first, securing 19 out of the 52 seats. In the 1988 presidential election, Clerides led in the first round with 33.3% of the votes but narrowly lost in the second round to independent candidate George Vassiliou, who was supported by AKEL. In the 1991 legislative election, the party finished first again and gained one more seat, bringing their total to 20 seats in the House of Representatives.

=== 1993–2003: Clerides Presidency of Cyprus ===
In the second round of the 1993 presidential election, Glafcos Clerides narrowly defeated the incumbent president, George Vassiliou. Following his victory, Clerides extended an open invitation to all political parties to form a coalition government. After several days of negotiations, a majority government was established, consisting of the DISY and DIKO. Clerides did not seek re-election for the party leadership, and as a result, on June 11, 1993, Yiannakis Matsis became the president of the Democratic Rally, running unopposed. Matsis reassured that the party would continue supporting the government of its founder, Glafcos Clerides. Clerides prioritised the admission of Cyprus into the European Economic Community (EEC), the predecessor of the European Union, and aimed to hold a United Nations National Conference to address the Cyprus problem. Faced with a high budget deficit inherited from the previous administration, Clerides' finance minister implemented measures to reduce public spending and increase taxation.

During his presidency, Clerides engaged in multiple discussions with Rauf Denktaş, the president of the self-proclaimed Turkish Republic of Northern Cyprus, to address the Cyprus problem. Clerides sought greater involvement from the United States in resolving the issue, which he conveyed to President Bill Clinton during their meeting in New York. Additionally, Clerides had a notable disagreement with British Foreign Minister Douglas Hurd over his stance on the Cyprus issue.

On June 7, 1997, Yiannakis Matsis expressed his serious dissatisfaction with president Clerides for not listening to the party's input. He also criticised his party for failing to produce substantial policy proposals and for the vindictive behaviour of some members. In protest, he withdrew his candidacy for re-election as president of DISY. Nicos Anastasiades competed with Demetris Syllouris for the party leadership and won the election with 69% of the vote.

During his first five-year term, Clerides lost the support of his coalition partner, DIKO, which instead backed his opponent, Georgios Iacovou, in the 1998 presidential election. Despite being supported by both AKEL and DIKO, Iacovou lost the election, with Clerides winning a second term with 50.8% of the vote in the second round. Although Clerides aimed to create an all-party government, AKEL and DIKO strongly opposed his invitation and positioned themselves as "strong opposition" parties. After discussions with multiple party leaders, a coalition government was formed between DISY, EDEK and United Democrats (EDI).

During 1997–1998, Clerides' government made the decision to acquire Russian-made S-300 missile systems, heightening tensions with Turkey, which threatened military action in response. The crisis ended in December 1998 when Cyprus relocated the missiles to Greece. The so-called Cypriot S-300 crisis led to the dissolution of the coalition government, leaving only DISY and EDI remaining in the coalition.

During his second term, Clerides actively pursued Cyprus's admission to the European Union, engaging in numerous official accession talks.

Clerides had announced that he would not seek re-election for a third term. However, on January 3, 2003, he urged Cypriots to grant him an additional 16-month term to pursue a reunification deal with Northern Cyprus. Clerides called on other candidates to support him and form a national unity government to achieve this goal; however, his opponents did not agree to his proposal.

=== 2003: A fragmented presidential bid ===
In the 2003 presidential election, Clerides sought an additional 16-month term to pursue a reunification deal. Although he had the official support of his party, a notable former DISY MP and Attorney General, Alecos Markides, opposed Clerides' candidacy and ran independently in the election. Markides garnered significant support from within DISY, including backing from 5 of the 19 DISY MPs, and secured 6.6% of the vote. Clerides received 38.8% in the first round, while Tassos Papadopoulos, supported by DIKO and AKEL, won the election outright with 51.5% of the vote, making DISY the official opposition.

Following the election results, DISY President Nicos Anastasiades immediately expelled the five MPs who had supported Markides from the party's registry. These MPs included Demetris Syllouris, Prodromos Prodromou, Riccos Erotokritou, Eleni Vrahimi, and Sofoklis Hatziyiannis. Anastasiades strongly criticised them for undermining Clerides' candidacy and contributing to the party's electoral defeat. The five expelled members condemned Anastasiades' action and demanded his resignation, warning of a "civil war" within the party.

=== 2004: DISY Splits into Three over the Annan Plan ===
On April 24, 2004, Cypriot voters participated in a referendum on the Annan Plan, which proposed the establishment of the United Republic of Cyprus as a federation of two states: Greek Cypriot and Turkish Cypriot. The plan outlined a federal government that would feature a collective Presidential Council, a bicameral legislature, a Supreme Court with equal representation from both communities, and mechanisms for reconciliation and troop reductions.

After an internal referendum, the Democratic Rally officially endorsed the Annan Plan, encouraging its voters to support it with a YES vote. Glafcos Clerides, who was 85, notably remarked that if the majority rejected the plan, he would prefer to die rather than witness the resulting devastating consequences.

The Democratic Rally was the only parliamentary party to support the Annan Plan, alongside the smaller United Democrats, leading to a vote against the referendum. Despite the party's official stance, a significant faction within DISY expressed opposition to the referendum, raising concerns about a potential split of the party. Former DISY president Yiannakis Matsis, who had previously clashed with Anastasiades' leadership, initiated plans to form a new political party called "European Rally", receiving support from expelled MPs Prodromos Prodromou and Demetris Syllouris.

The opponents of the Annan Plan followed through on their threats by founding the alliance "Rally For Europe" in preparation for the 2004 European Parliament elections. Among the six candidates were Yiannakis Matsis, along with Riccos Erotokritou and Prodromos Prodromou, all of whom were critical of Anastasiades' DISY leadership. The alliance also received support from expelled DISY MP and Parliamentary Spokesperson Demetris Syllouris, although he did not actively join it. The Democratic Rally contested the use of the term "Rally" in the alliance's name, citing legal restrictions against other parties using it. Ultimately, the alliance was renamed "For Europe" and received 10.8% of the votes, with Matsis securing one of the six seats in the European Parliament. The Democratic Rally narrowly surpassed AKEL, winning two seats with 28.2% of the votes.

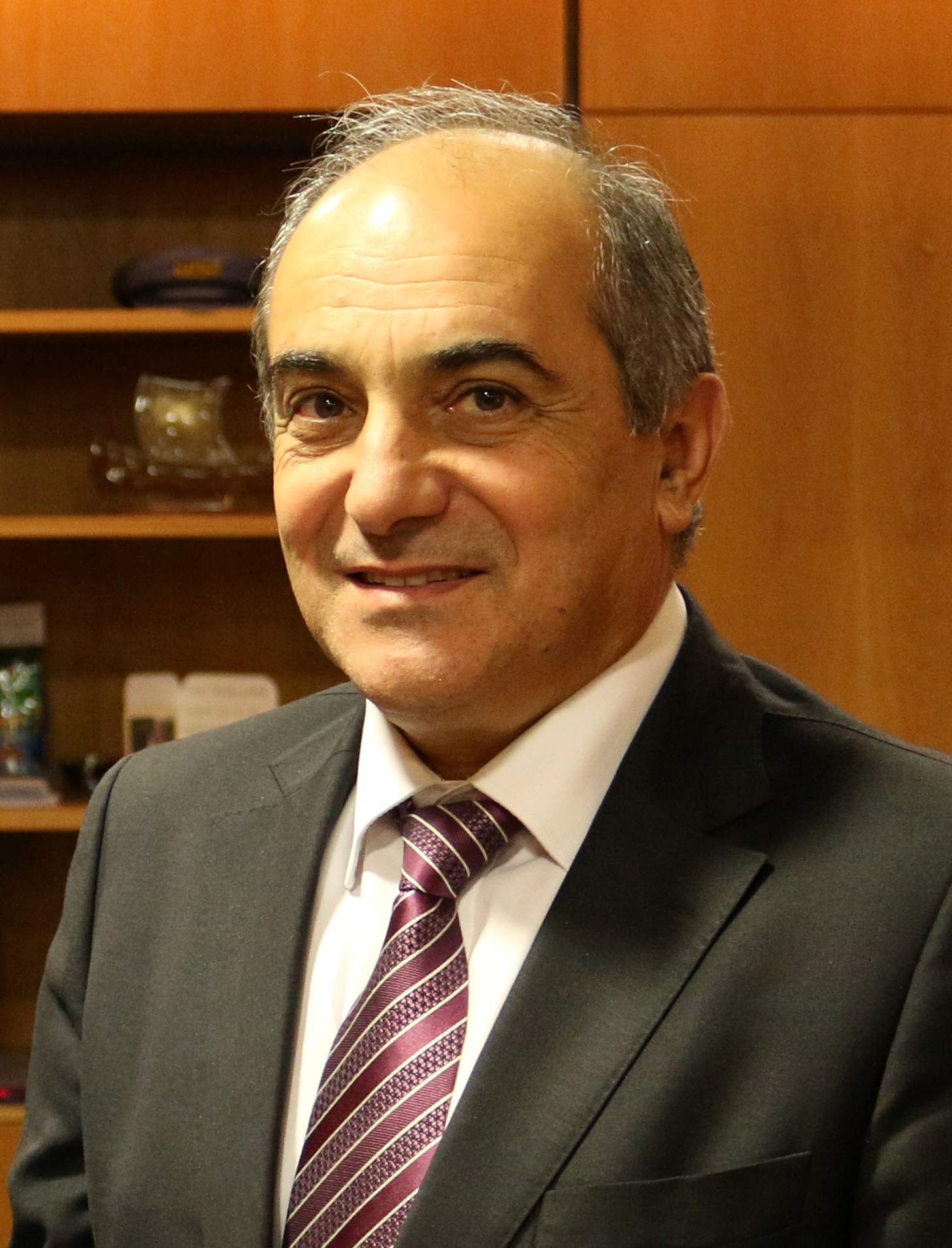
Demetris Syllouris, expelled DISY MP and president of the splinter EVROKO

Following the elections, the "For Europe" alliance continued to distance itself from its parent party, DISY, and eventually evolved into a registered political party known as European Democracy (EvroDi). Despite initially endorsing the alliance, Demetris Syllouris refused to join EvroDi and promoted the foundation of a new political movement, the European Party (EVROKO).

In 2005, Syllouris proposed merging the right-wing parties EvroDi and New Horizons to form EVROKO. He gained support from New Horizons and from a significant faction of expelled DISY MPs and EvroDi members. However, Prodromos Prodromou, president of EvroDi, did not accept the merger proposal. This led to a split in EvroDi, with many of its members, including its vice-president Riccos Erotokritou, joining EVROKO.

The aftermath of the internal disagreements led to the split of DISY into three co-existing parties, each led by influential and notable figures who had played active roles during Glafcos Clerides' administration.

=== 2006: Loss of voters to the European Party ===
In the 2006 legislative election, the Democratic Rally finished second to AKEL, securing 30.3% of the vote—its poorest performance since 1976. The European Party, led by Demetris Syllouris, garnered a notable 5.8% of the vote, drawing significant support away from DISY. European Democracy, the second splinter party, led by Prodromos Prodromou, received only 0.4% of the votes.

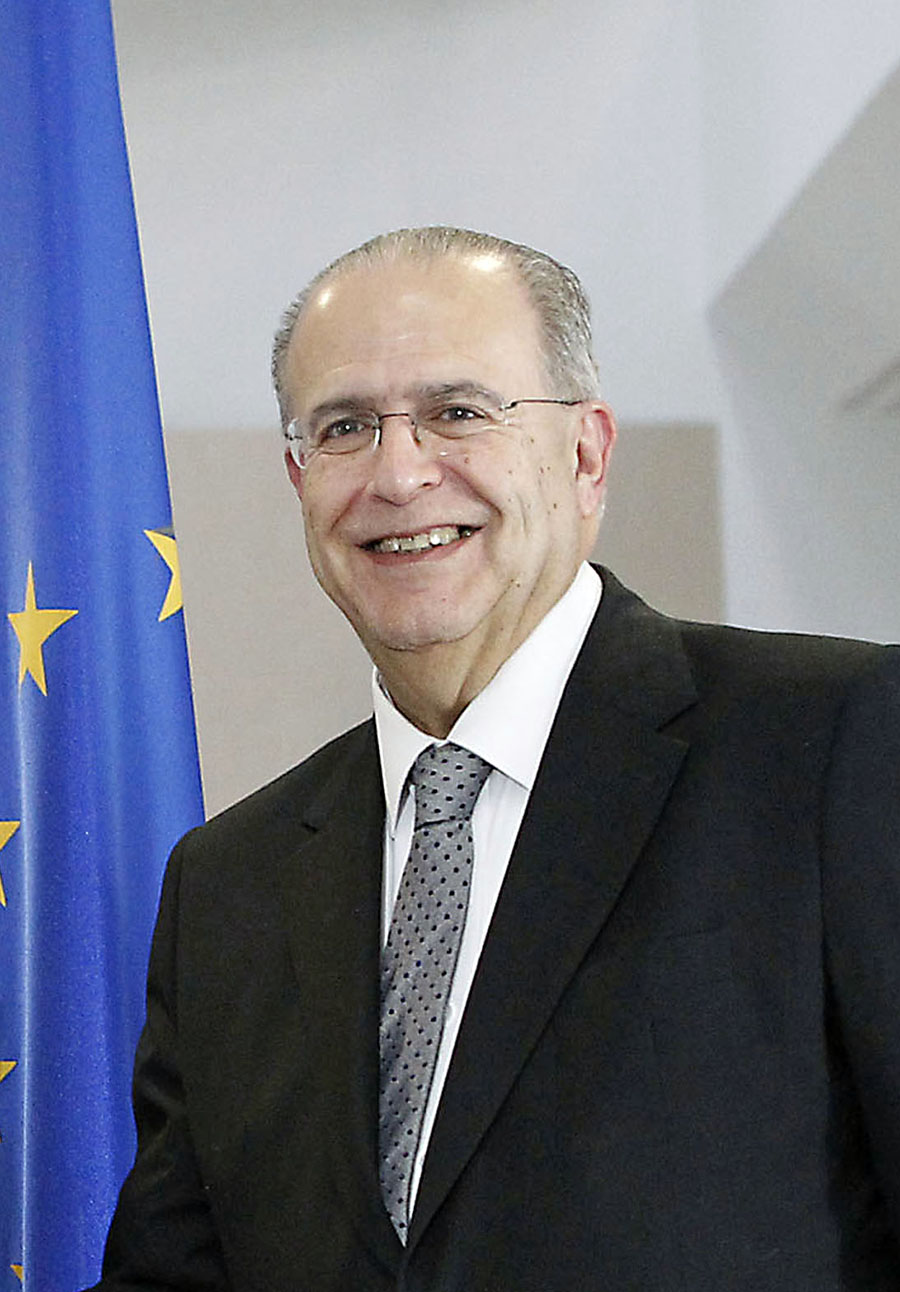
Ioannis Kasoulidis, former Minister of Foreign Affairs, MEP and DISY's candidate for the 2008 presidential election

=== 2008: Another presidential defeat ===
After the defeat in the 2003 presidential election, the split of DISY into three parties over opposing views on the Annan Plan, and the loss to AKEL in the 2006 legislative election, the Democratic Rally sought a candidate with broad multi-party support for the 2008 presidential election. Their candidate, former Minister of Foreign Affairs and MEP Ioannis Kasoulidis, received backing from several small parties, including the splinter European Democracy. However, he failed to gain the support of the stronger EVROKO, which instead supported the incumbent Tassos Papadopoulos.

In the first round, Kasoulidis narrowly surpassed the leader of AKEL, Demetris Christofias. However, the Democratic Party, whose candidate Tassos Papadopoulos failed to advance to the second round, supported Christofias, resulting in Kasoulidis losing the election with 46.6% of the vote in the second round.

Following the election, Prodromos Prodromou, leader of European Democracy, rejoined the Democratic Rally, effectively merging his party with it.

=== 2008–2013: Rising popularity as opposition to Christofias' administration ===
Following the defeat of Ioannis Kasoulidis in the 2008 presidential election, the Democratic Rally maintained its position as the main opposition party. The administration of President Demetris Christofias faced significant challenges that led to widespread protests, notably the Naval Base Explosion in Mari and the 2012–2013 Cypriot financial crisis. Opinion polls indicated that the Christofias' government was largely perceived as responsible for the economic downturn, resulting in low approval ratings by the end of his term.

The Democratic Rally capitalised on the prevailing dissatisfaction with the AKEL government, securing 34.3% of the votes in the 2011 legislative elections. Subsequent opinion polls suggested a strong likelihood of victory for the party in the 2013 presidential election.

=== 2013–2023: Anastasiades' turbulent presidency of Cyprus ===
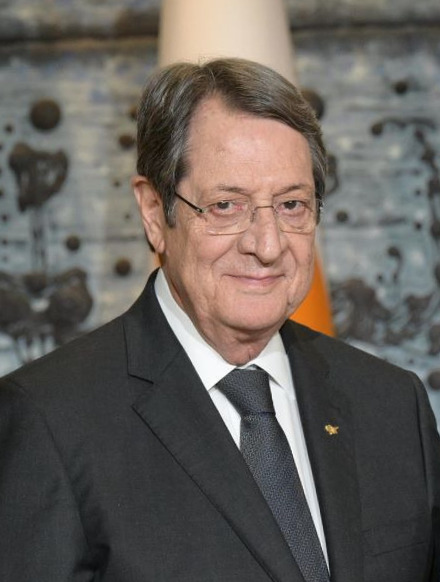
Nikos Anastasiades, former MP, President of DISY (1997–2013) and President of Cyprus (2013–2023)

An internal election was held within the Democratic Rally to select a candidate for the 2013 presidential election. The party president, Nicos Anastasiades won the election, receiving 86.7% of the votes, while his opponent, MEP Eleni Theocharous, received 13.3%.

Anastasiades campaigned on the public dissatisfaction with Demetris Christofias' handling of the economy, using the slogan "Crises need Leaders", in reference to the financial crisis. He also received support from DIKO. In the first round of the election, Anastasiades secured 45.5% of the vote, nearly 20 percentage points ahead of AKEL-backed Stavros Malas. In the second round, Anastasiades won the presidency with 57.5% of the vote. His majority government was a coalition of DISY, DIKO and EVROKO.

Following Anastasiades' election, MP Averof Neofytou was elected as the new president of the Democratic Rally. Neofytou had previously served as mayor of Polis (1992-1996) and as minister of communications and works (1999-2003) in Clerides' administration.

Anastasiades inherited the financial crisis, forcing him to break his campaign promises and implement a strict banking bailout in collaboration with the European Union and the International Monetary Fund. The agreement, signed off by the Eurogroup, aimed to prevent the bankruptcy of Cyprus' main banks and avoid a potential euro exit. As a result of these broken promises, DIKO withdrew its support from the government, leading to the removal of its ministers from the cabinet.

During his first term, Anastasiades oversaw the closure of Cyprus Popular Bank, Cyprus Cooperative Bank and Cyprus Airways. He also participated in critical negotiations regarding the Cyprus problem, including the Mont Pèlerin talks in November 2016 and the Crans-Montana talks in the summer of 2017. However, no agreement was reached between the two sides.

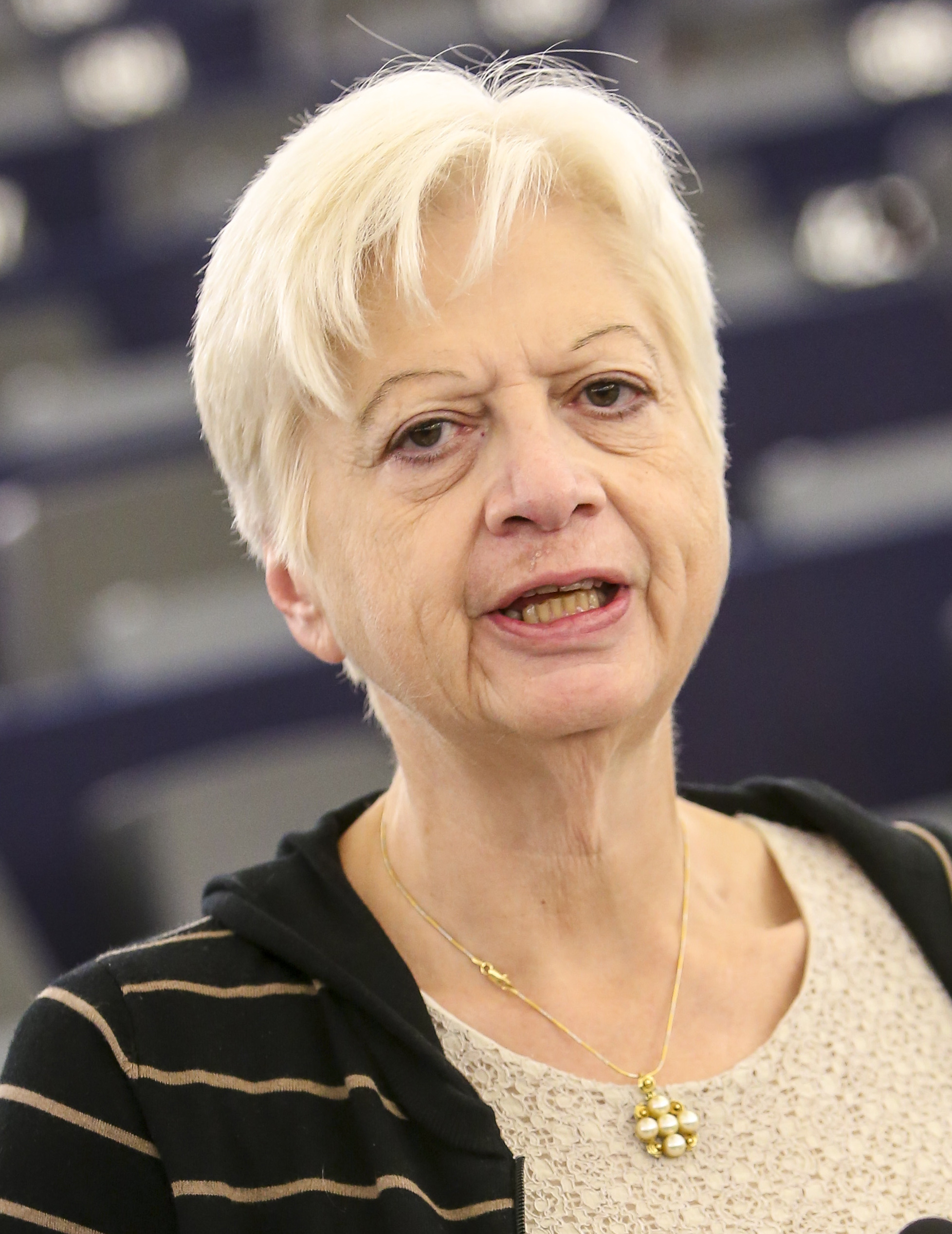
Eleni Theocharous, former MP and MEP, founder and president of the splinter Solidarity Movement

In November 2015, Eleni Theocharous, a two-term DISY MEP and paediatric surgeon who had contested Anastasiades for DISY's presidential nomination in 2013, announced her resignation from the party. She cited disagreements over DISY's stance on the Cyprus problem as the reason for her departure. Theocharous subsequently founded a new splinter party, the Solidarity Movement. In early 2016, EVROKO, led by Demetris Syllouris, withdrew its support from Anastasiades' government and merged with Theocharous' Solidarity Movement ahead of the 2016 legislative election. This shift left Anastasiades with a minority government, supported solely by DISY.

In the 2016 legislative election, DISY received 30.7% of the votes and secured 18 seats, a decrease from the 20 seats won in the previous election. Theocharous' Solidarity Movement, which had absorbed Syllouris' EVROKO, gained 5.2% and won three seats.

During his second term, Anastasiades confronted significant challenges, including the COVID-19 pandemic and the consequences of the Russian invasion of Ukraine, which he condemned. Despite these challenges, Anastasiades oversaw the implementation of the General Healthcare System and the establishment of a Minimum Wage.

During his presidency, Anastasiades was involved in multiple corruption scandals, including the Pandora Papers, the Cyprus Confidential and the trilogy of Makarios Drousiotis' political thrillers. In 2024, Drousiotis' third publication, "Mafia State," instigated a criminal investigation against Anastasiades, prompting the involvement of international legal practitioner Gabrielle Louise McIntyre.

=== 2023: DISY voters split over two candidates ===
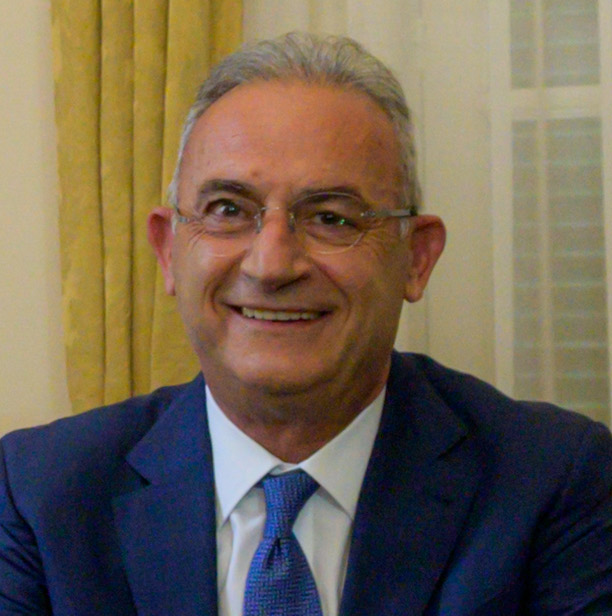
MP Averof Neofytou, President of DISY (2013–2023) and DISY's candidate for the 2023 presidential election

In December 2021, the president of the Democratic Rally, Averof Neofytou, announced his candidacy for the 2023 presidential election, positioning himself as the official party nominee. However, his candidacy was challenged by Nikos Christodoulides, Anastasiades' minister of foreign affairs, who also expressed his intention to seek DISY's nomination. Following accusations of undermining his campaign, Christodoulides resigned from his ministerial role and subsequently declared his independent candidacy for the 2023 presidential election.

Christodoulides' independent candidacy created significant turmoil within the Democratic Rally. Neofytou referred to Christodoulides as a "traitor," alleging that he sought to divide the party. DISY expelled Christodoulides from its party register and attempted to distance itself from him. Despite this, Christodoulides, a prominent politician who secured official support from DIKO, EDEK, DIPA, and the Solidarity Movement, led to a division among Democratic Rally voters. Early opinion polls indicated a near-even split among DISY supporters between Neofytou and Christodoulides.

Christodoulides used to be the absolute favourite to win the election, with approximately 50% of the public expressing support for him in May 2022, giving him a substantial 30-point lead over Neofyto in the first round. Despite a decline in popularity over time, he retained a 6-point lead in the latest opinion polls. Throughout his campaign, Christodoulides was generally hesitant to criticise the 10-year administration of Nicos Anastasiades, often stating that his approach would focus on continuing successful policies while aiming to improve or abolish those that had not produced the desired outcomes.

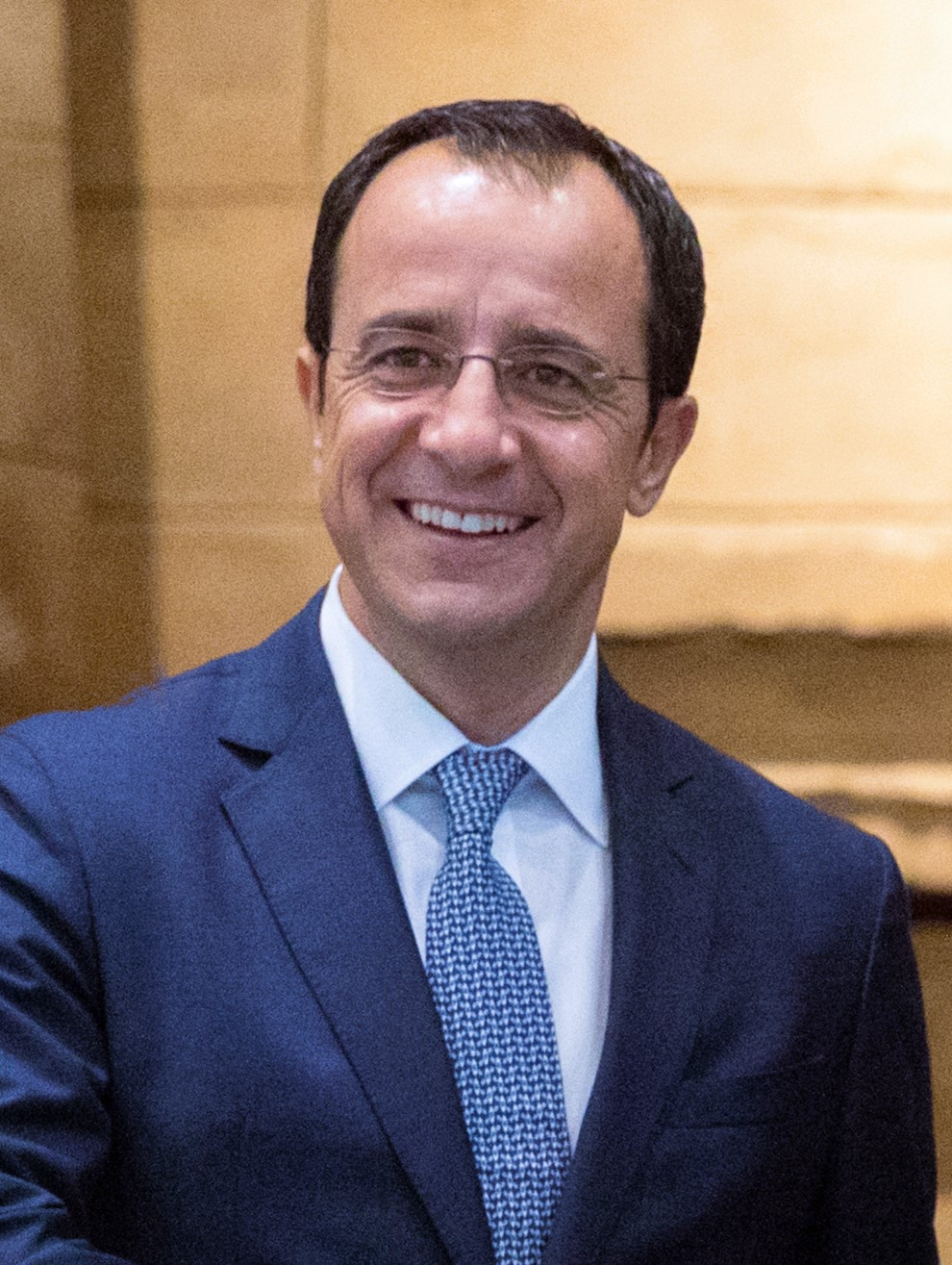
Nikos Christodoulides, Spokesman of Anastasiades' Government (2014–2018), minister of foreign affairs (2018–2022) and Independent President of Cyprus (2023–present)

Nicos Christodoulides announced his intention to form a national unity government, consisting of ministers from all political parties and free from political opposition. This proposal was promptly rejected by Averof Neofytou, who stated that the Democratic Rally would not participate in any government led by Christodoulides and, should DISY lose the election, the responsible course of action would be to respect the will of the electorate and assume a constructive role in opposition.

During the Democratic Rally's contentious presidential campaign, a significant portion of party members expressed support for Christodoulides. There were even allegations that President Anastasiades was covertly undermining Neofytou's candidacy in favor of Christodoulides. This internal division intensified, leading influential figures, including former parliamentary candidates Pantelis Poietis and Konstantinos Letybiotis, to resign from DISY and endorse Christodoulides.

Neofytou finished third in the first round of the election, receiving 26.1% of the votes, the lowest share in the history of the Democratic Rally. This outcome marked the first instance in which a DISY candidate did not advance to the second round of a presidential election. In the second round, DISY opted not to endorse any candidate officially, although several prominent party members expressed their support. Notable endorsements for Christodoulides came from President Anastasiades, Education Minister Prodromos Prodromou, former Health Minister Constantinos Ioannou, and Parliamentary Spokesperson Nicos Tornaritis. In contrast, AKEL-backed Andreas Mavroyiannis received backing from Neofytou, Foreign Minister Ioannis Kasoulidis, and former MP Kaiti Clerides, the daughter of party founder Glafcos Clerides.

The second round of the election resulted in an equal division among the DISY electorate between Andreas Mavroyiannis and Christodoulides, the latter of whom was viewed by some, including Neofytou, as a "renegade". Christodoulides ultimately won the election with 52.0% of the vote in the second round, incorporating a faction of DISY members into his government.

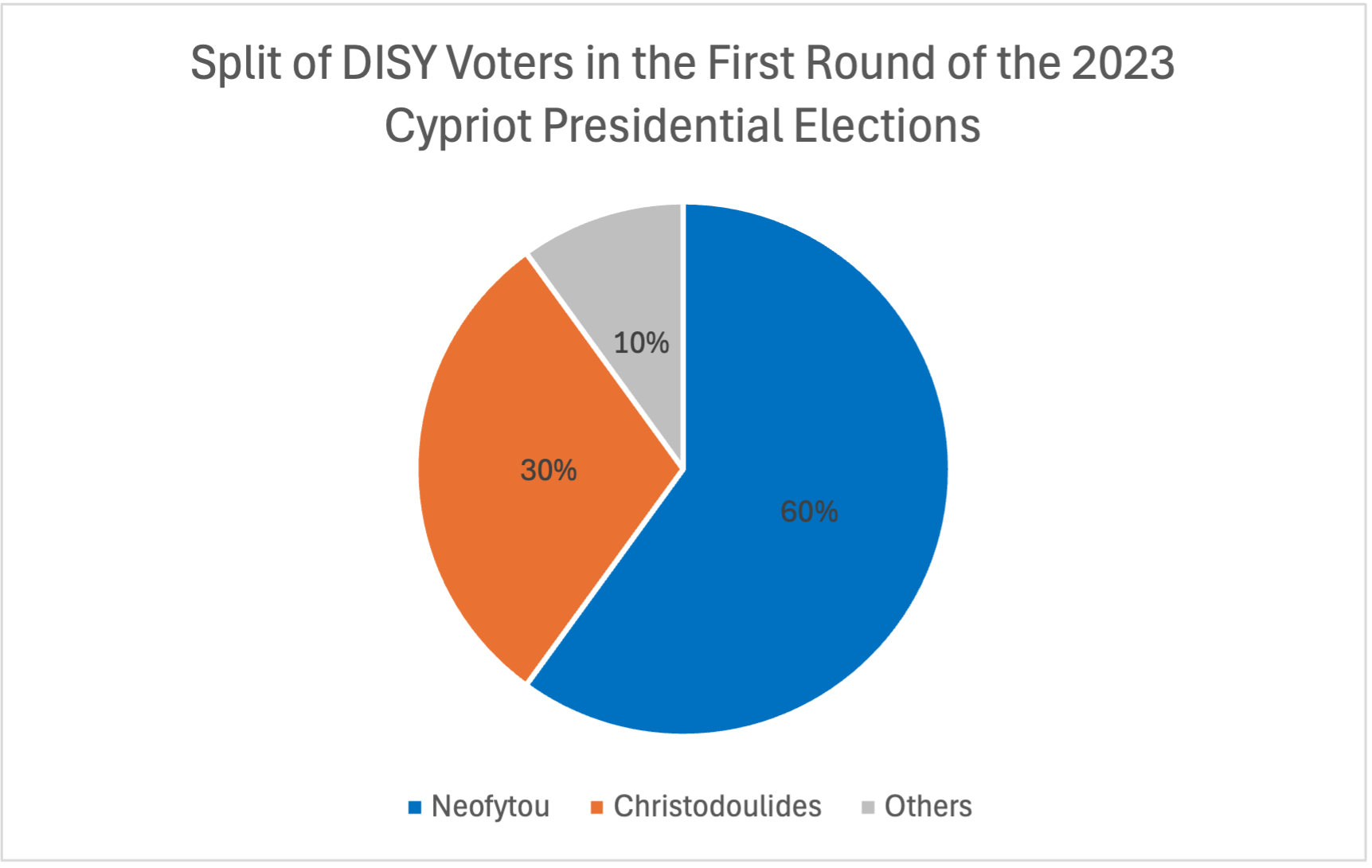
Chart demonstrating how voters who supported DISY in the 2021 Cypriot legislative election cast their votes in the 2023 presidential election

=== 2023 – present: A disoriented opposition to Christodoulides' administration ===
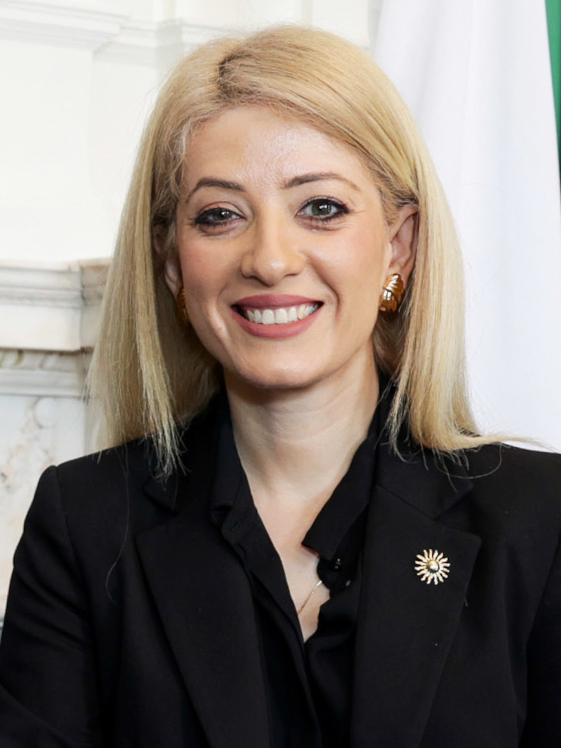
MP Annita Demetriou, President of the Democratic Rally (2023–present) and President of the House of Representatives (2021–present)

Following the defeat in the 2023 presidential election and the internal divisions resulting from Nikos Christodoulides' independent candidacy, three politicians announced their intention to run for the presidency of the Democratic Rally. Averof Neofytou, seeking a third term, was set to compete against former minister of finance Harris Georgiades and MP Demetris Demetriou. However, to prevent further conflicts, both Neofytou and Georgiadis withdrew their candidacies and endorsed Annita Demetriou, the President of the House of Representatives, as a unity candidate. Annita Demetriou, recognised for her strong reputation and broad multi-party acceptance, ultimately defeated Demetris Demetriou, winning the presidency of DISY with 69.2% of the votes.

Despite the party's official stance as 'responsible opposition', many view DISY's role as ambiguous and uncertain. A substantial number of Christodoulides' ministers are active members of DISY, and the party has shown significant support for the president in parliament. A notable example is the 2024 National Budget, where DISY made fewer amendments than the governing parties. This perceived balancing act has led to public dissatisfaction with the party's role as opposition to the unpopular Christodoulides administration.

In preparation for the 2024 European Parliament Election, DISY carried out an internal election to choose its six candidates. Nine people announced their interest for the election, with former Health Minister Michalis Hatzipantelas emerging as the top candidate.

Marios Pelekanos, one of the three vice presidents of the Democratic Rally, finished second to last in the internal election and was not included in the list of six nominees. Pelekanos expressed profound dissatisfaction and subsequently resigned from his position within the party leadership, citing a series of underlying events that had undermined his standing. After multi-day discussions with ELAM, on March 22, 2024, it was announced that he would run in the European Elections as a candidate of the ultranationalist party. The leader of DISY, Annita Demetriou, harshly condemned this move, and the centre-right party proceeded by deleting Pelekanos from its register, emphasising the vast differences in politics between the two parties. Marios Pelekanos, who had also held the position of government spokesperson in Anastasiades' administration from 2021 to 2023, became the Press Representative of ELAM

Despite numerous challenges, including the candidacy of Pelekanos with ELAM, Eleni Theocharous (leader of the Solidarity Movement) with DIKO, and Pantelis Poietis (former DISY MP candidate) with DIPA, as well as many corruption scandals from Anastasiades' administration and widespread dissatisfaction with DISY's role as the main opposition in Christodoulides' government, the centre-right party managed to achieve another first-place finish, maintaining its two seats in the European Parliament. However, the 24.8% of the popular vote is the worst result in the party's history, significantly lower than the 29% in the 2019 election and the 37.8% in the 2014 election.

==== Anastasiades–Neofytou dispute ====
In a podcast on July 8, 2024, former President Nicos Anastasiades criticised Averof Neofytou's campaign for the 2023 presidential elections, suggesting that his detachment from the sentiments of DISY supporters contributed to the party's defeat. Anastasiades also questioned Neofytou's perceived alignment with the AKEL-backed candidate, Andreas Mavroyiannis, in the second round of the election.

Anastasiades' remark, "I don't want to bother with bitter people", directed at Neofytou, elicited a strong response from the latter on Twitter. Neofytou responded by stating that those who are "bitter" are the thousands who once trusted Anastasiades, along with broader criticisms of Anastasiades' handling of the Cyprus problem.

==== Demetriou–Neofytou dispute ====
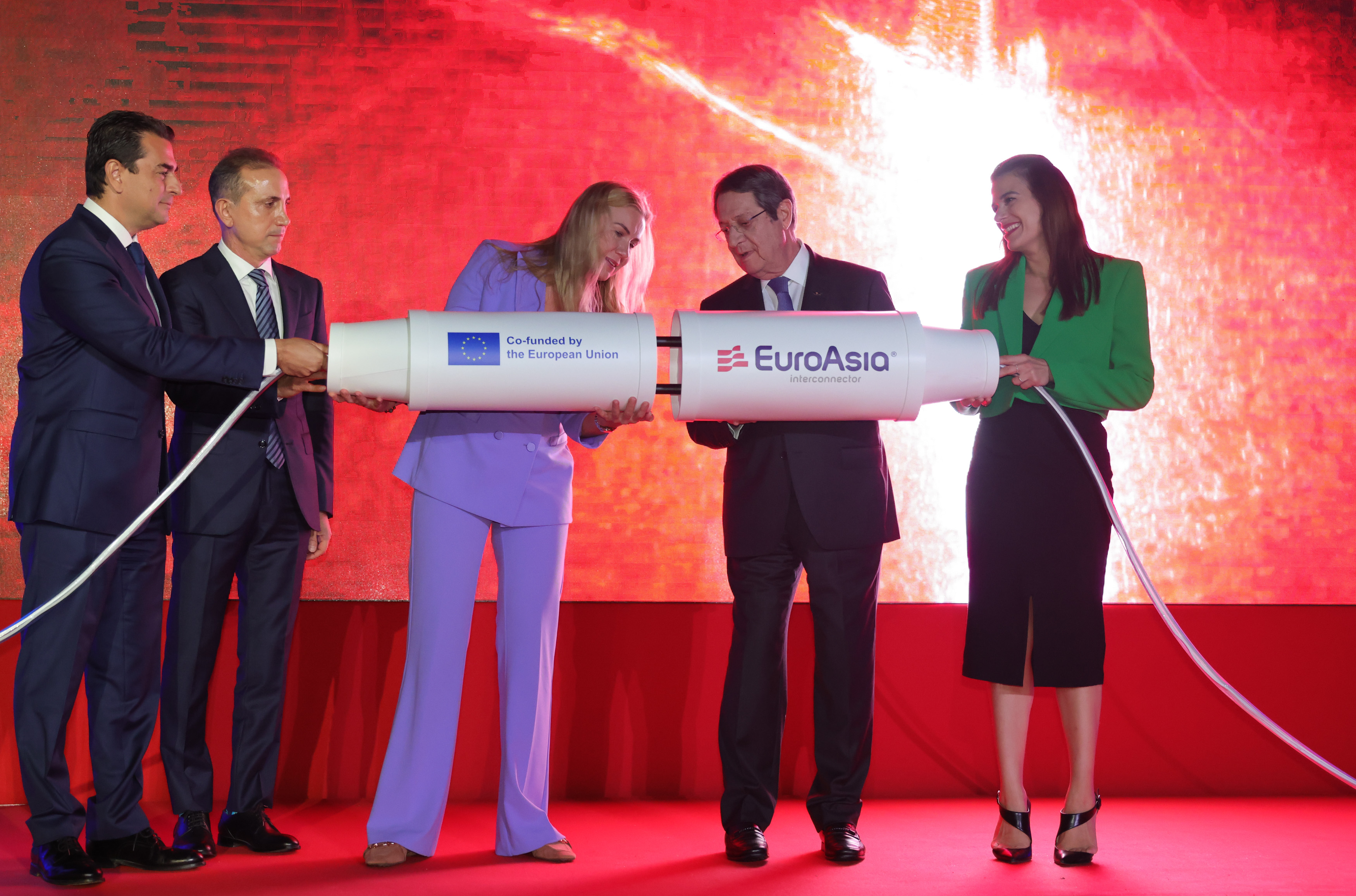
The inauguration ceremony of the Interconnector, hosted by President Anastasiades at the Presidential Palace in Nicosia in 2022

The Great Sea Interconnector is a planned HVDC interconnector between the Greek, Cypriot, and Israeli power grids via the world's longest submarine power cable. The project has received support from the Democratic Rally. However, in late August 2024, Averof Neofytou expressed opposition to advancing any energy projects before resolving the Cyprus problem, and he questioned whether the interconnection will actually reduce energy bills in Cyprus. This stance led to a conflict with DISY President Annita Demetriou, who has strongly supported the project. Neofytou, along with Kyriakos Hadjiyiannis, remains among the only two DISY MPs opposing the interconnection, which has been primarily developed during the presidency of Nicos Anastasiades.

In September 2024, when asked whether Neofytou could again be the party's candidate for the 2028 presidential election—following his expressed interest—Demetriou responded that Neofytou had already been tested in 2023, and respecting the public's verdict, DISY should now move forward for the good of the country.

== Election results ==
=== Parliament ===
In the legislative elections of 21 May 2006, the party won 30.52% of the popular vote and 18 out of 56 available seats, and in the legislative elections of 22 May 2011, the party won 34.27% of the popular vote and 20 out of 56 available seats. The party's candidate, Nicos Anastasiades, won the 2013 presidential elections, ending five years of rule by the Progressive Party of Working People (AKEL). In the legislative elections of 2016, the party won 30.68%, taking 18 seats in the parliament and remaining the party with the largest representation.

House of Representatives
Election	Votes			Seats	
Election	#	%	Rank	#	±
1976	485,332	28.1	2nd	0 / 35	new
1981	92,886	31.9	2nd	12 / 35	▲12
1985	107,223	33.6	1st	19 / 56	▲7
1991	122,495	35.8	1st	20 / 56	▲1
1996	127,380	34.5	1st	20 / 56	0
2001	139,721	34.0	2nd	19 / 56	▼1
2006	127,776	30.3	2nd	18 / 56	▼1
2011	138,682	34.3	1st	20 / 56	▲2
2016	107,824	30.7	1st	18 / 56	▼2
2021	99,328	27.8	1st	17 / 56	▼1
2026	101,013	27.2	1st	17 / 56	0

=== European Parliament ===
European Parliament
Election	Votes			Seats	
Election	#	%	Rank	#	±
2004	94,355	28.23	1st	2 / 6	new
2009	109,209	35.65	1st	2 / 6	0
2014	97,732	37.75	1st	2 / 6	0
2019	81,539	29.02	1st	2 / 6	0
2024	91,316	24.78	1st	2 / 6	0

=== Presidential elections ===
Presidential Elections
Year	Candidate	1st Round			2nd Round			Elected
Year	Candidate	Votes	%	Result	Votes	%	Results	Elected
1978	Spyros Kyprianou (Democratic Party)	no opponent						Yes
1983	Glafcos Clerides	104.294	33,9	2nd place	Lost in first round			No
1988	Glafcos Clerides	111.504	33,3	1st place	157,228	48,4	2nd place	No
1993	Glafcos Clerides	130.663	36,7	2nd place	178.945	50,3	1st place	Yes
1998	Glafcos Clerides	158.763	40,1	2nd place	206.879	50,8	1st place	Yes
2003	Glafcos Clerides	160.724	38,8	2nd place	Lost in first round			No
2008	Ioannis Kasoulidis	150.996	33,51	1st place	210.195	46,63	2nd place	No
2013	Nicos Anastasiades	200.591	45,46	1st place	236.965	57,48	1st place	Yes
2018	Nicos Anastasiades	137.231	35,50	1st place	215.281	55,99	1st place	Yes
2023	Averof Neofytou	103.748	26.11	3rd place	Didn't qualify			No

== Party leaders ==
No.	Leader	Portrait	Term of office		Key Events	President
1	Glafcos Clerides (1919-2013)		1976	1993	1978 Cypriot presidential election; 1981 Cypriot legislative election; 1983 Cypriot presidential election; 1985 Cypriot legislative election; 1988 Cypriot presidential election; 1991 Cypriot legislative election; 1993 Cypriot presidential election	1993–2003
2	Yiannakis Matsis (born 1933)		1993	1997	1996 Cypriot legislative election	
3	Nicos Anastasiades (born 1946)		1997	2013	1998 Cypriot presidential election; 2001 Cypriot legislative election; 2003 Cypriot presidential election; 2004 Annan Plan referendum; 2004 European Parliament election; 2006 Cypriot legislative election; 2008 Cypriot presidential election; 2009 European Parliament election; 2011 Cypriot legislative election; 2013 Cypriot presidential election	2013–2023
4	Averof Neofytou (born 1961)		2013	2023	2014 European Parliament election; 2016 Cypriot legislative election; 2018 Cypriot presidential election; 2019 European Parliament election; 2021 Cypriot legislative election; 2023 Cypriot presidential election	
5	Annita Demetriou (born 1985)		2023	incumbent	2024 European Parliament election; 2026 Cypriot legislative election	

== See also ==
- Reduction of military conscription in Cyprus
