= 1993 Cypriot presidential election =

- 7 February 1993 (first round); 14 February 1993 (second round)
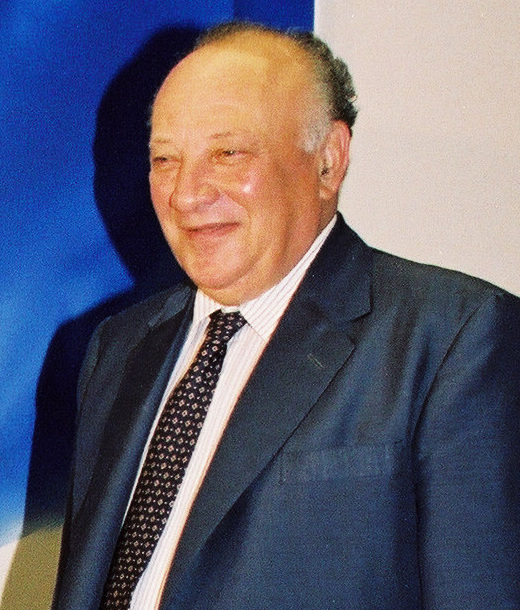

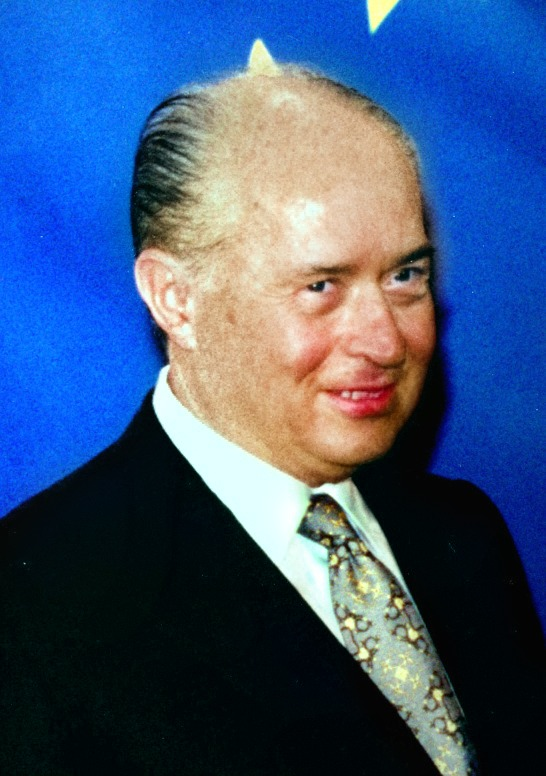
Candidate	Glafcos Clerides	George Vassiliou
Party	DISY	Independent
Popular vote	178,945	176,769
Percentage	50.31%	49.69%
President before election
George Vassiliou
Independent
Elected President
Glafcos Clerides
DISY

Presidential elections were held in Cyprus on 7 February 1993, with a second round on 14 February. The result was a victory for Glafcos Clerides of the Democratic Rally after he finished as runner-up behind George Vassiliou, supported by AKEL, in the first round, a reverse of the 1988 elections. Voter turnout was 92.4% in the first round and 93.3% in the second.

== Results ==
Candidate	Party	First round		Second round	
Candidate	Party	Votes	%	Votes	%
George Vassiliou	Independent	157,027	44.15	176,769	49.69
Glafcos Clerides	Democratic Rally	130,663	36.74	178,945	50.31
Pashalis Pashalidis	Independent	66,300	18.64		
Georgios Mavrogenis	Independent	890	0.25		
Giannakis Taliotis		755	0.21		
Total		355,635	100.00	355,714	100.00
Valid votes		355,635	97.67	355,714	96.80
Invalid/blank votes		8,483	2.33	11,760	3.20
Total votes		364,118	100.00	367,474	100.00
Registered voters/turnout		393,993	92.42	393,993	93.27
Source: Nohlen & Stöver, IFES
