= 1991 Cypriot legislative election =

Parliamentary elections were held in Cyprus on 19 May 1991. The result was a victory for the Democratic Rally, which won 20 of the 56 seats. Voter turnout was 93%.

== Results ==
Party	Votes	%	Seats	+/–
Democratic Rally	122,495	35.81	20	+1
Progressive Party of Working People	104,771	30.63	18	+3
Democratic Party	66,867	19.55	11	–5
Movement for Social Democracy	37,264	10.89	7	+1
ADISOK	8,199	2.40	0	New
Pan-Cyprian Refugee Movement	1,887	0.55	0	New
Independents	555	0.16	0	0
Total	342,038	100.00	56	0
Valid votes	342,038	96.45		
Invalid/blank votes	12,600	3.55		
Total votes	354,638	100.00		
Registered voters/turnout	381,322	93.00		
Source: Nohlen & Stöver
