= 1981 Cypriot legislative election =

Parliamentary elections were held in Cyprus on 24 May 1981. AKEL and the Democratic Rally both won 12 of the 35 seats. Voter turnout was 95.7%.

== Results ==
Party	Votes	%	Seats	+/–
Progressive Party of Working People	95,364	32.77	12	+3
Democratic Rally	92,886	31.92	12	+12
Democratic Party	56,749	19.50	8	–13
Movement for Social Democracy	23,772	8.17	3	–1
Pan-Cyprian Fighting Front	8,115	2.79	0	New
Union of the Centre	7,968	2.74	0	New
New Democratic Front	5,584	1.92	0	New
Independents	583	0.20	0	–1
Total	291,021	100.00	35	0
Valid votes	291,021	98.45		
Invalid/blank votes	4,581	1.55		
Total votes	295,602	100.00		
Registered voters/turnout	308,729	95.75		
Source: Nohlen & Stöver, Ker-Lindsay & Faustmann
