= 2004 European Parliament election in Cyprus =

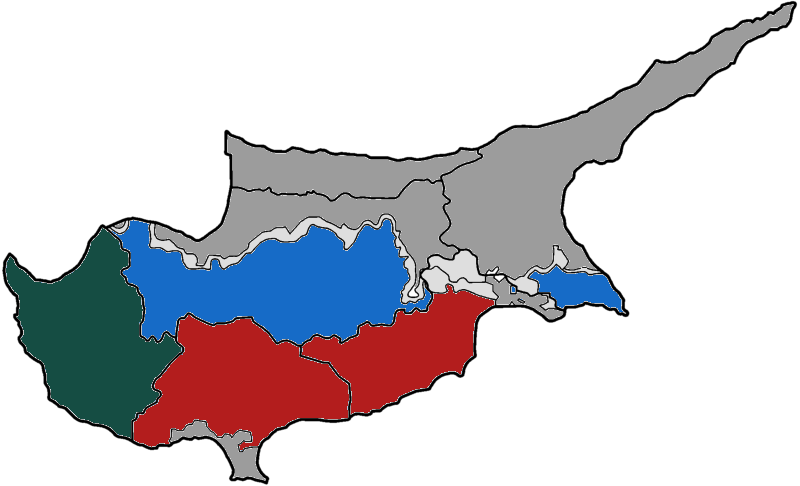

An election took place on 13 June 2004 for MEPs representing Cyprus constituency for the 2004–2009 term of the European Parliament. It was part of the wider 2004 European election.

This was the first time Cypriot voters had elected members of the European Parliament. They were election of the six deputies who would be representing the Republic of Cyprus at the European Parliament. The number of registered voters was 483,311 – out of which 503 were Turkish Cypriots and 2054 EU nationals – while the total number of people who voted was 350.387 or 72,50% of the registered voters. The number of polling stations was 1077, allocated to each polling district in the following manner: Nicosia 416, Limassol 323, Famagusta (Republic of Cyprus-administered area) 50, Larnaca 169 and Paphos 119.

The six seats were contested by 59 candidates, belonging to parties or party coalitions or running as individuals. The conservative Democratic Rally and the left-wing Progressive Party of Working People (AKEL) achieved the largest shares of the vote.

As of 2024, the Democratic Rally has finished first in every European election in Cyprus.

== Results ==
Party	Votes	%	Seats
Democratic Rally	94,355	28.23	2
Progressive Party of Working People	93,212	27.89	2
Democratic Party	57,121	17.09	1
For Europe	36,112	10.80	1
Movement for Social Democracy	36,075	10.79	0
United Democrats–KPE–European Cyprus	6,534	1.95	0
New Horizons	5,501	1.65	0
Ecological and Environmental Movement	2,872	0.86	0
LASOK	808	0.24	0
Independents	1,678	0.50	0
Total	334,268	100.00	6
Valid votes	334,268	95.40	
Invalid/blank votes	16,119	4.60	
Total votes	350,387	100.00	
Registered voters/turnout	483,311	72.50	
Source: MOI

== See also ==
- MEPs for Cyprus 2004-2009
