= 1978 Cypriot presidential election =

- February 1978
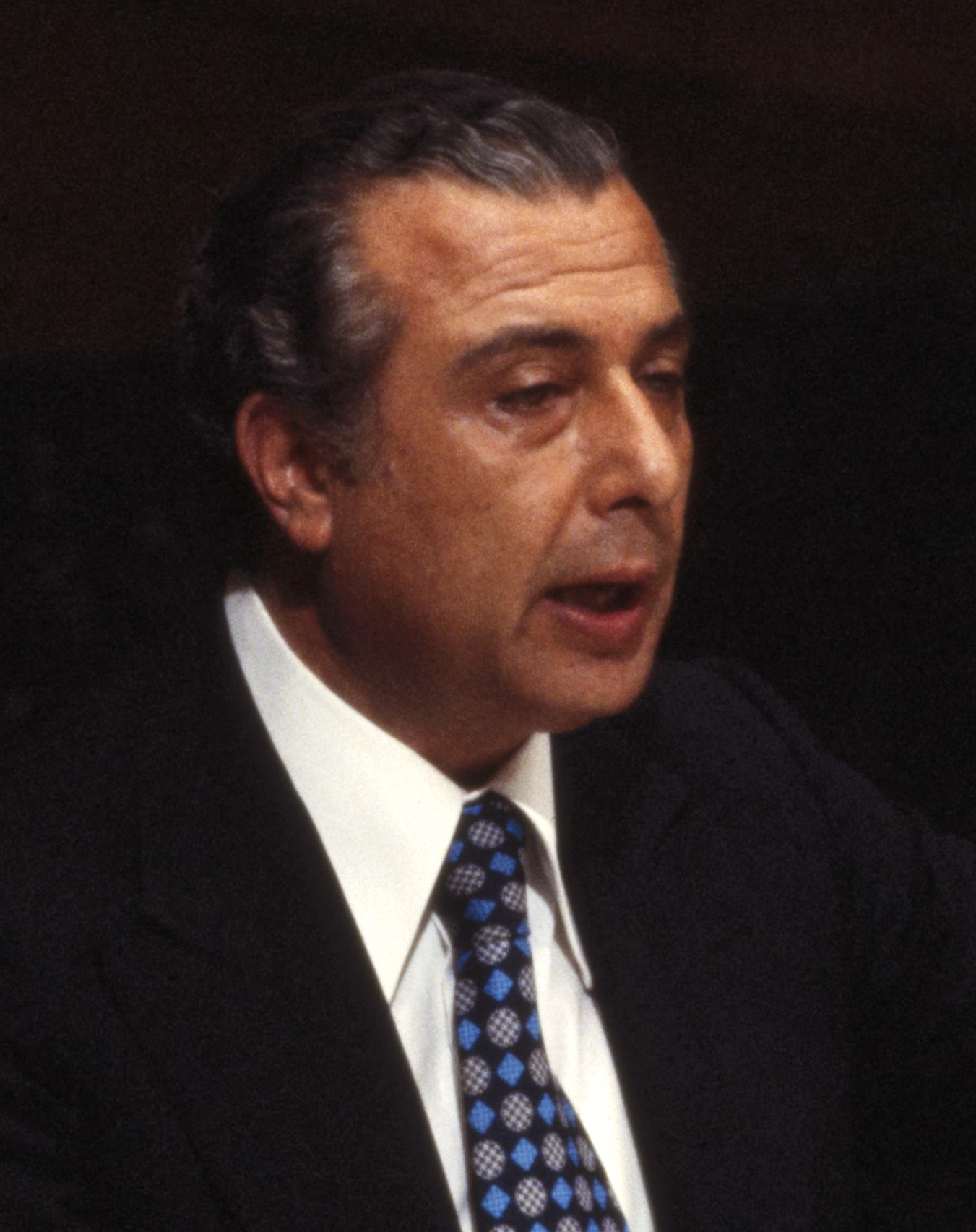
Candidate	Spyros Kyprianou
Popular vote	Unopposed
President before election
Spyros Kyprianou
Elected President
Spyros Kyprianou

Presidential elections were due to be held in Cyprus in February 1978. However, after Vassos Lyssarides of the Movement for Social Democracy announced on 8 January that he would not stand as a candidate, incumbent president Spyros Kyprianou (who had held office since the death of Makarios III in August 1977, and was elected in a walkover in the election to fill the balance of Makarios' term in September 1977) was left as the only remaining candidate. Kyprianou officially became president on 26 January.
