= 1988 Cypriot presidential election =

- 14 February 1988 (first round); 21 February 1988 (second round)
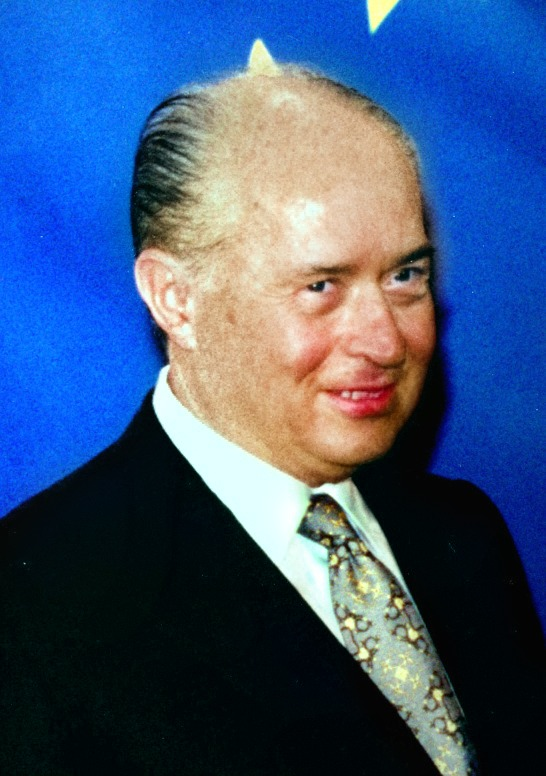

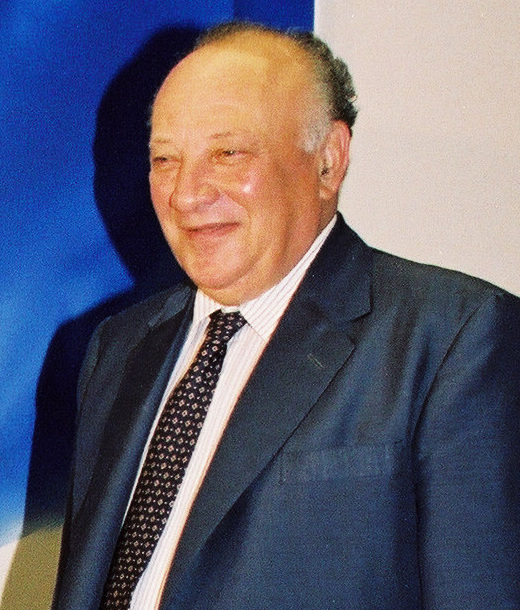
Candidate	George Vassiliou	Glafcos Clerides
Party	Independent (Note: Supported by AKEL)	DISY
Popular vote	167,834	157,228
Percentage	51.63%	48.37%
President before election
Spyros Kyprianou
DIKO–AKEL
Elected President
George Vassiliou
Independent

Presidential elections were held in Cyprus on 14 February 1988, with a second round on 21 February. They were the first presidential elections in the country's history to go to a second round, and resulted in a victory for George Vassiliou as an independent candidate supported by AKEL after he finished as the runner-up behind Glafcos Clerides of the Democratic Rally in the first round. Voter turnout was 94% in both rounds.

== Results ==
Candidate	Party	First round		Second round	
Candidate	Party	Votes	%	Votes	%
Glafcos Clerides	Democratic Rally	111,504	33.32	157,228	48.37
George Vassiliou	Independent	100,748	30.11	167,834	51.63
Spyros Kyprianou	Democratic Party	91,335	27.29		
Vassos Lyssarides	Movement for Social Democracy	30,865	9.22		
Thrasos Georgiadis		187	0.06		
Total		334,639	100.00	325,062	100.00
Valid votes		334,639	97.63	325,062	94.77
Invalid/blank votes		8,141	2.37	17,928	5.23
Total votes		342,780	100.00	342,990	100.00
Registered voters/turnout		363,719	94.24	363,740	94.30
Source: Nohlen & Stöver
