= 1985 Cypriot legislative election =

Parliamentary elections were held in Cyprus on 8 December 1985. The result was a victory for the Democratic Rally, which won 19 of the 56 seats. Voter turnout was 95%.

The main issue in the election was the failed negotiations at the United Nations between the president of Cyprus Spyros Kyprianou and Rauf Denktaş, the president of the breakaway state of Northern Cyprus.

These elections were the first for an enlarged House of Representatives, with the size of the assembly increased from 35 to 56 seats.

== Results ==
| Party | Votes | % | Seats | +/– |
|---|---|---|---|---|
| Democratic Rally | 107,223 | 33.56 | 19 | +7 |
| Democratic Party | 88,322 | 27.65 | 16 | +8 |
| Progressive Party of Working People | 87,628 | 27.43 | 15 | +3 |
| Movement for Social Democracy | 35,371 | 11.07 | 6 | +3 |
| Independents | 923 | 0.29 | 0 | 0 |
| Total | 319,467 | 100.00 | 56 | +21 |
| Valid votes | 319,467 | 97.45 | | |
| Invalid/blank votes | 8,353 | 2.55 | | |
| Total votes | 327,820 | 100.00 | | |
| Registered voters/turnout | 346,549 | 94.60 | | |
Source: Nohlen & Stöver
