= Nicos Tornaritis =

Cypriot politician and jurist

- Νίκος Τορναρίτης
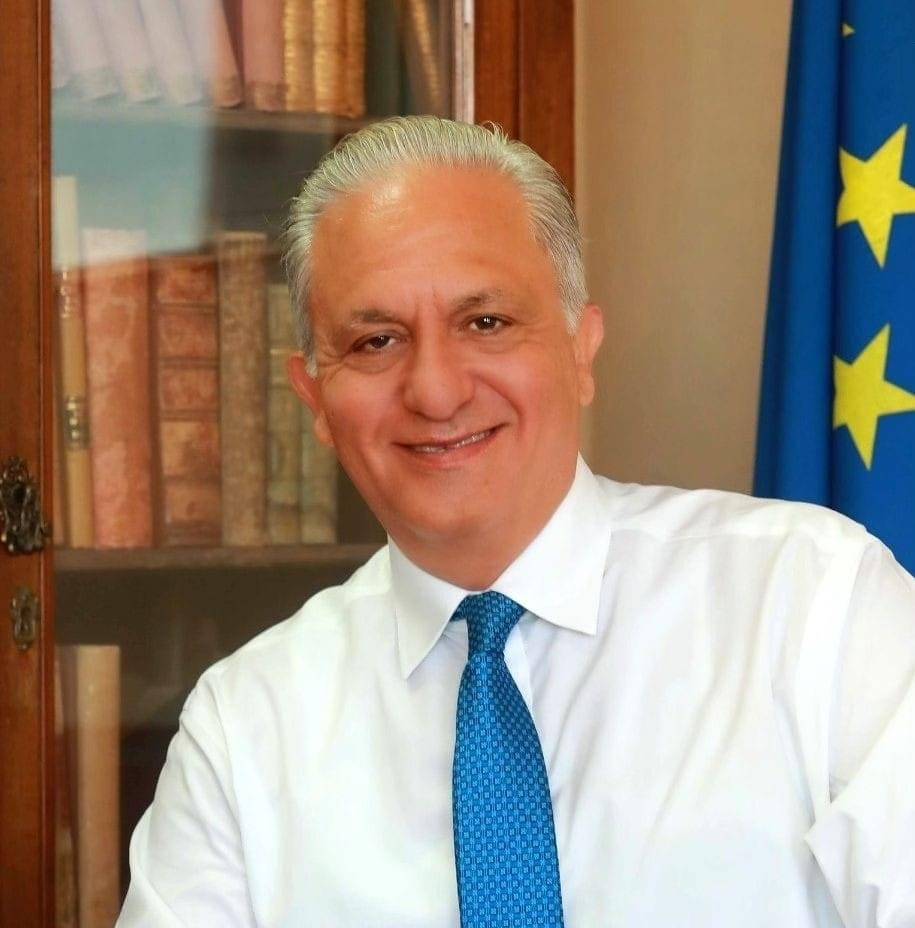
- Nicos Tornaritis

Member of the Cypriot House of Representatives
- Incumbent
- Assumed office June 7, 2001
- Constituency: Nicosia

Personal details
- Born: 6 December 1964 (age 61) Nicosia, Cyprus
- Party: Democratic Rally (DISY)
- Spouse: Lia Andrea Ellinas
- Children: 2
- Education: National and Kapodistrian University of Athens; John F. Kennedy School of Government at Harvard University
- Profession: Lawyer
- Website: nicostornaritis.com

Nicos Tornaritis (Greek: Νίκος Τορναρίτης) (born December 6, 1964) is a Cypriot jurist and politician, who serves as member of the Cypriot House of Representatives since 2001. He is one of the most senior figures within the Democratic Rally (DISY) party.

== Education ==
He has studied Law and Political Science at the National and Kapodistrian University of Athens where he has graduated in 1988, and he has attended the programme “Senior Managers in Government” in John F. Kennedy School of Government at Harvard University in 2010.

== Career ==
He is the Honorary Consul of Kenya in Cyprus since 1998. As Honorary Consul he contributed to the establishment of hospitals and schools in the African country.

Tornaritis has been a member of the House of Representatives of Cyprus since 2001, and in May 2021 achieved to be re-elected for the fifth consecutive time in the second place on the Nicosia district ballot, under the banner of Democratic Rally (DISY).

In parliament, Tornaritis served as a chair of the Committee on Educational Affairs and Culture from 2004 to 2013. Currently he is the Chairman of the Legal Affairs, Justice and Public Order Committee of the House of Representatives Cyprus, since May 2021. He is the Parliamentary Leader of the Democratic Rally Cyprus since 2013.

Since 2013 he represents the Democratic Rally on the European People's Party Parliamentary Leaders session.

Tornaritis is the Head of the Parliament's delegation to the Asian Parliamentary Assembly (APA) since 2013. In October 2017 he was elected APA Vice President and President of the APA Standing Committee on Economic and Sustainable Development.

In addition to his role in parliament, Tornaritis has been chairing the Cypriot delegation to the Parliamentary Assembly of the Council of Europe since 2020. In this capacity, he has since been serving on the Committee on the Honouring of Obligations and Commitments by Member States of the Council of Europe (Monitoring Committee), the Committee on Migration, Refugees and Displaced Persons, and the Sub-Committee on Diasporas and Integration. He is also the Assembly's rapporteur responsible for the United Nations global compacts for migrants and refugees (since 2020) and – alongside Damien Cottier – the co-rapporteur on Montenegro.

On July 10, 2020, Tornaritis proposed a resolution on the Committee on Culture, Science, Education and Media in the Parliamentary Assembly of the Council of Europe in relation to the change of Hagia Sophia's status from museum to mosque, and it has been passed with clear majority. He later organised an enlightenment campaign on Famagusta and Turkey's plans to open the fenced off area of the City on the Parliamentary Assembly of the Council of Europe.

== Writing work ==
Tornaritis published in Greek a study entitled “The Cyprus Shipping Industry”.

He is also the author of many published articles in the local and international press regarding the Cyprus problem, the reform of education, modern European framework, sustainable development and environmental protection, participatory democracy, the role of the younger generation and the modernization of the state and its institutions.

== Recognition ==
Tornaritis has been honoured with the Medal of Honor of the city of Athens in 2002 for his aid in organising the Southeast European Conference in Athens.

He has been honoured by the World Hellenic Inter-parliamentary Association.

== Personal life ==
He is married to Lia Andrea Ellinas and has two daughters.
