= George Vassiliou =

President of Cyprus from 1988 to 1993

- Γιώργος Βασιλείου
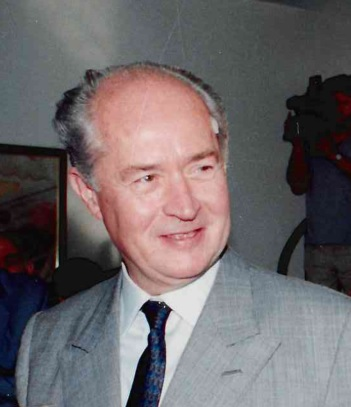
- Vassiliou in 1990

3rd President of Cyprus
- In office 28 February 1988 – 28 February 1993
- Preceded by: Spyros Kyprianou
- Succeeded by: Glafcos Clerides

1st President of United Democrats
- In office 1996–2005
- Succeeded by: Michalis Papapetrou

Member of the House of Representatives
- In office 6 June 1996 – 31 June 1999
- Constituency: Nicosia

Personal details
- Born: 20 May 1931 Famagusta, British Cyprus
- Died: 13 January 2026 (aged 94) Nicosia, Cyprus
- Party: United Democrats (1993–2026); Independent (until 1993)
- Spouse: Androulla Georgiadou (m. 1966)
- Children: 3
- Education: Corvinus University of Budapest; University of London

George Vassiliou (Greek: Γιώργος Βασιλείου; 20 May 1931 – 13 January 2026) was a Cypriot politician and businessman who served as President of Cyprus from 1988 to 1993. He was also the president of United Democrats from 1996 to 2005 and sat in the Cypriot House of Representatives from 1996 to 2001.

As president, he oversaw a successful period of economic reform and growth, the search for a diplomatic solution to the Cyprus problem through the United Nations, as well as the country's application for membership of the European Union and the first adaptations to European monetary and economic standards.

== Early life ==
Vassiliou was born on 20 May 1931 in Famagusta, British Cyprus, to a Greek Cypriot family. He was the son of Vasos Vassiliou, an ophthalmologist and left-wing figure, and Fofos Vassiliou, a dentist. He grew up in Greece until 1941, when the family returned to Cyprus due to the Nazi invasion of Greece. Vassiliou studied at secondary schools in Paphos and Limassol, and at the American Academy of Larnaca, before going on to study medicine in Geneva, which he had to interrupt when his father volunteered as a doctor in the communist side during the Greek Civil War. After the monarchist victory, the Vassiliou family settled in Hungary and later Soviet Uzbekistan.

Vassiliou later moved to Vienna and then to Budapest, where, after working in a factory and as an interpreter for Greek refugees, he obtained a scholarship and studied economics at the Karl Marx University of Economic Sciences (current Corvinus University of Budapest), where he went on to earn a doctorate and was a student of Imre Nagy. He fled Hungary following the Soviet invasion in 1956 and continued his studies at the University of London. In 2018, György Markó's book The Rambo of Pest revealed that Vassiliou was a spy of the counter-intelligence in the Rákosi era, and after 1956 he was an informant for the Ministry of Interior under the name 'Gergely', and he reported on the economist János Kornai, among others.

Before returning to Cyprus in 1962, he worked as an economist and market researcher for the Reed Paper Group in the United Kingdom in 1971 and worked for British academic bodies. In Cyprus, he founded the Middle East Market Research Bureau, a successful consultancy business that grew to have offices in the Middle East, South Africa, and eastern and central Europe, which he led until 1988. Vassiliou also participated in economic programmes of the Cyprus Broadcasting Corporation.

He also taught at the Cranfield School of Management and was a speaker at several international conferences. He went on to publish the first book on marketing in the Middle East.

== President of Cyprus (1988–1993) ==
Vassiliou was elected president as an independent candidate with support from AKEL in the 1988 presidential election. He was sworn in on 28 February 1988, succeeding Spyros Kyprianou.

He worked on and promoted a negotiated solution to the Cyprus dispute, launching a national and international campaign and especially with negotiations within the United Nations framework. He thus abandoned Kyprianou's policy of "talks with preconditions" and forced the president of Northern Cyprus Rauf Denktaş to negotiate. In a meeting with British Prime Minister Margaret Thatcher in March 1988, Vassiliou expressed to her his opposition to the two-state solution and the maintenance of the British bases of Akrotiri and Dhekelia on the island. Vassiliou intended to speak directly with Turkish President Turgut Özal about these matters, even in secret, but the British High Commissioner for Cyprus, William Willberforce, advised him to meet with Denktaş first.

In August 1990, Vassiliou and Denktaş met in Geneva. Boutros Boutros-Ghali, elected as the new Secretary-General of the United Nations, and in response to the international mobilisation orchestrated by Vassiliou, received a first draft of a comprehensive resolution from the UN Security Council in mid-1992. At the end of 1992, all aspects of the dispute were discussed, including a new map of Cyprus that included the return of Morphou, Famagusta and the villages of Mesaoria, but Turkey refused and the plan failed in 1994. Most Cypriot parties and the Church also opposed Ghali's proposal, and this failure was decisive in Vassiliou's defeat in the 1993 re-election.

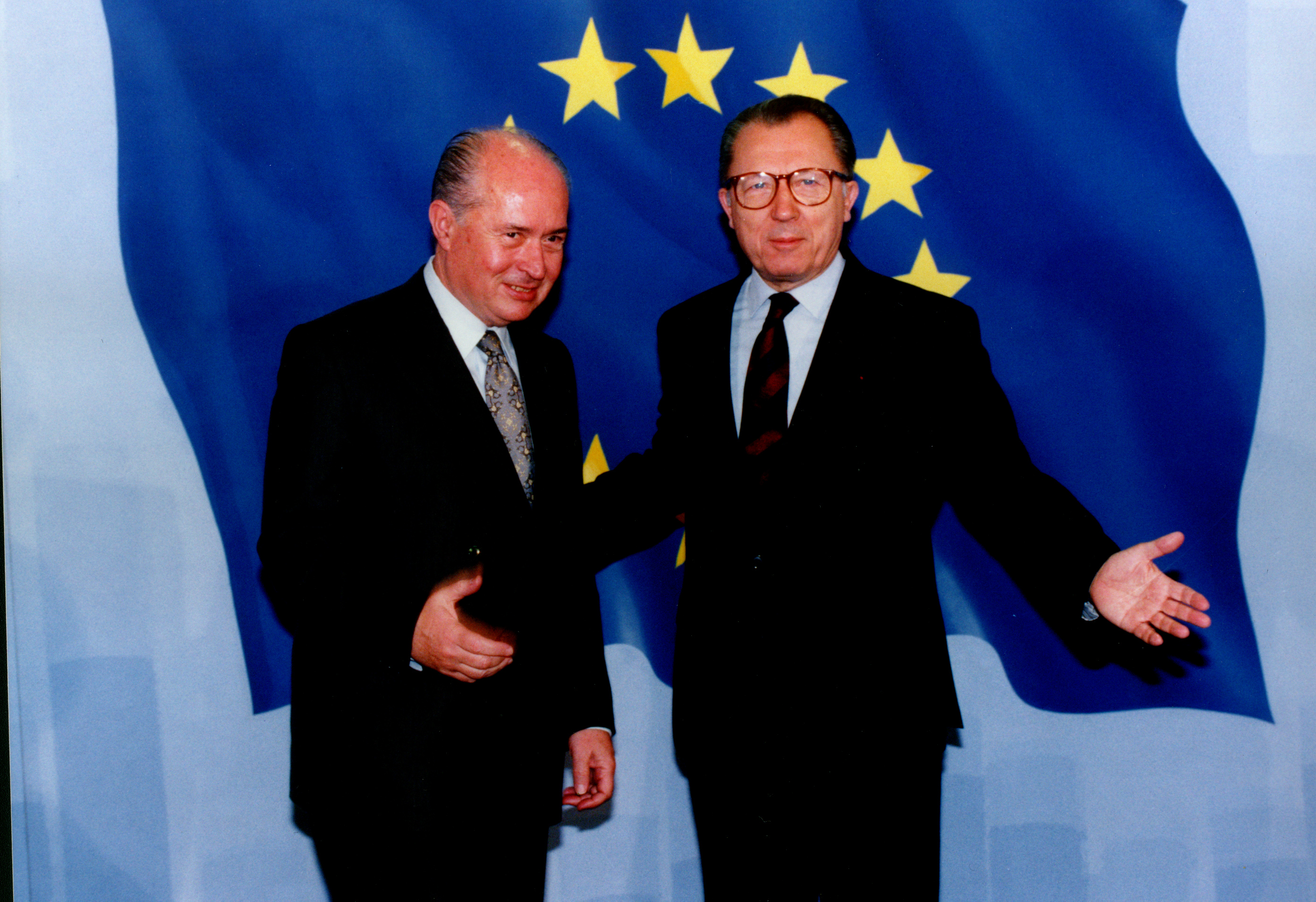
Cyprus President George Vassiliou with President of the European Commission Jacques Delors, 30 September 1992

He made widely publicized visits to government offices and schools that contrasted with his predecessors. During his time in office, Cyprus experienced economic growth and a doubling of its per capita gross domestic product through a tax reform. He introduced VAT to harmonise the Cypriot economy with European standards, despite the rejection this caused. Vassiliou's government streamlined cumbersome civil service, established the University of Cyprus in 1992, cut taxes to prevent tax evasion, had illegal shacks on the Cypriot coast demolished, modernised public administration by introducing new technologies, introduced environmental protection measures and abolished the state monopoly in media, opening up the creation of private radio stations, such as Logos. He also expanded a network of press offices at Cypriot diplomatic missions to promote the Cyprus peace process.

As president, he formally applied for Cyprus to join the European Union in 1990, which was finalized in 2003. His efforts to integrate the country into the European Union were encouraged by Giannos Kranidiotis and Theodoros Pangalo. In 1992, Cyprus became the first country outside the EEC to peg its national currency to the European Currency Unit.

Vassiliou was again AKEL's candidate in the 1993 presidential election, losing re-election to Glafcos Clerides by two thousand votes in a second round. He left the office on 28 February 1993 after Clerides' inauguration.

== Post-presidency ==
After leaving the presidency, he founded the Free Democrats Movement in 1993, which later merged with Adisok and formed United Democrats in 1996. He was elected member of the House of Representatives in the 1996 legislative election. In the 2001 legislative election, he lost his seat.

Amid the 2004 Cypriot referendum he was a strong supporter of the Annan Plan. When the referendum failed, Vassiliou resigned as president of the United Democrats. Vassiliou was named the Chief Negotiator of Cyprus for its accession to the European Union in 1998 and until 2003. He had to supervise Cyprus's adjustment to European law.

He was a member of the European Council on Tolerance and Reconciliation, joining various former European leaders. In 2011, Vassiliou co-signed George Soros' open letter calling for more European unity amidst the currency turmoil surrounding the increased usage of the Euro as a single currency for the continent.

== Personal life and death ==
Vassiliou had three children and was married to the politician Androulla Georgiadou from 1966. He was known for his energetic two-handed handshake, which was nicknamed kappakoti (“to cup”). His daughter Sofia was a Volt Cyprus candidate in the 2024 European Parliament election.

Vassiliou died on 13 January 2026, at the age of 94, after being hospitalised for a respiratory infection. His funeral took place on 17 January at the Ayia Sofia cathedral in Nicosia. His coffin was transported on an artillery carriage and his arrival at the cathedral was greeted with a cannon salute. The funeral was attended by the President of Cyprus, Nikos Christodoulides; the President of Northern Cyprus, Tufan Erhürman; the Greek Foreign Minister, Giorgos Gerapetritis; and the former President of Northern Cyprus, Mehmet Ali Talat.

== Honours ==
=== Foreign honours ===
- Malta: Honorary Companion of Honour of the National Order of Merit (28 June 1991)
- Cyprus: Knight Grand Cross of the Order of Merit.
- France: Grand Cross of the National Order of the Legion of Honour.
- Greece: Knight Grand Cross of the Order of the Redeemer.
- Italy: Knight of Grand Cross of the Order of Merit of the Italian Republic.
- Portugal: Grand Collar of the Order of Prince Henry.
- Egypt: Knight Grand Collar of the Order of the Nile.

Political offices
Preceded by Spyros Kyprianou	President of Cyprus; 1988–1993	Succeeded by Glafcos Clerides
