= 1996 Cypriot legislative election =

Parliamentary elections were held in Cyprus on 26 May 1996. The result was a victory for the Democratic Rally, which won 20 of the 56 seats. Voter turnout was 92.9%.

== Results ==
Party	Votes	%	Seats	+/–
Democratic Rally	127,380	34.47	20	0
Progressive Party of Working People	121,958	33.00	19	+1
Democratic Party	60,726	16.43	10	–1
Movement for Social Democracy	30,033	8.13	5	–2
United Democrats	13,623	3.69	2	New
New Horizons	6,317	1.71	0	New
ADISOK	5,311	1.44	0	0
Ecological and Environmental Movement	3,710	1.00	0	New
Independents	463	0.13	0	0
Total	369,521	100.00	56	0
Valid votes	369,521	96.97		
Invalid/blank votes	11,530	3.03		
Total votes	381,051	100.00		
Registered voters/turnout	409,996	92.94		
Source: Nohlen & Stöver, Election Resources
