= 2001 Cypriot legislative election =

Parliamentary elections were held in Cyprus on 27 May 2001. The result was a victory for AKEL, which won 20 of the 56 seats. Voter turnout was 91.8%.

== Results ==
Party	Votes	%	Seats	+/–
Progressive Party of Working People	142,648	34.71	20	+1
Democratic Rally	139,721	34.00	19	–1
Democratic Party	60,986	14.84	9	–1
Movement for Social Democracy	26,767	6.51	4	–1
New Horizons	12,333	3.00	1	+1
United Democrats	10,635	2.59	1	–1
Fighting Democratic Movement	8,860	2.16	1	+1
Ecological and Environmental Movement	8,129	1.98	1	+1
Independents	908	0.22	0	0
Total	410,987	100.00	56	0
Valid votes	410,987	97.58		
Invalid/blank votes	10,188	2.42		
Total votes	421,175	100.00		
Registered voters/turnout	467,543	90.08		
Source: Nohlen & Stöver
