= 2014 European Parliament election in Cyprus =

- 25 May 2014

All 6 Cypriot seats to the European Parliament
- Turnout: 43.97% (▼15.43%p)
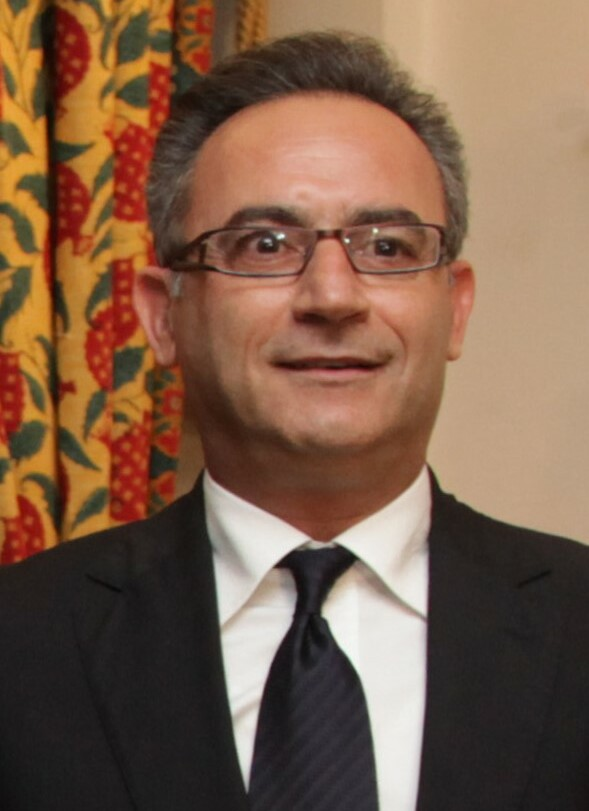

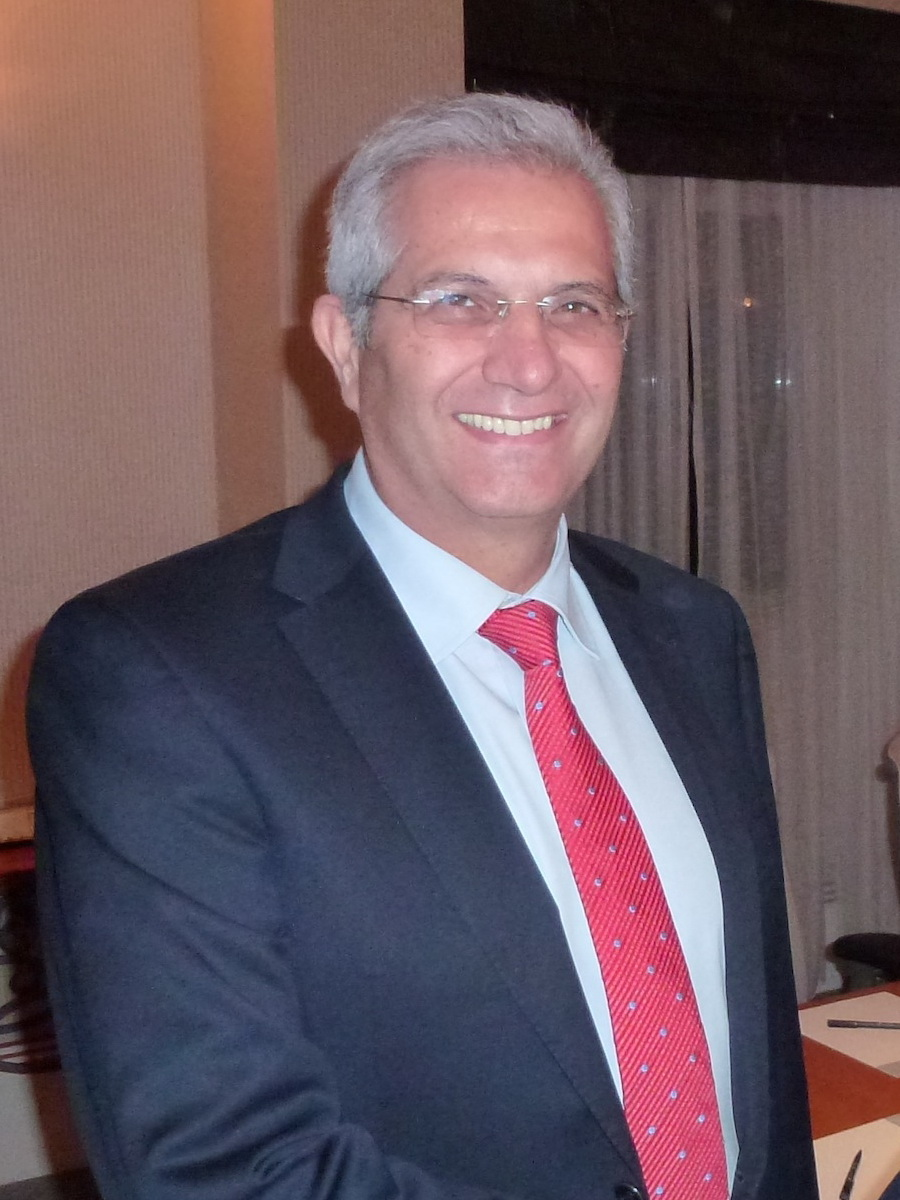
	First party	Second party
Leader	Averof Neofytou	Andros Kyprianou
Party	DISY	AKEL
Alliance	EPP	GUE/NGL
Last election	2 seats, 35.65%	2 seats, 34.90%
Seats won	2	2
Seat change	0	0
Popular vote	97,732	69,852
Percentage	37.75%	26.98%
Swing	▲2.10%p	▼7.92%p
	Third party	Fourth party
Leader	Nicolas Papadopoulos	Yiannakis Omirou
Party	DIKO	EDEK
Alliance	S&D	S&D
Last election	1 seats, 12.28%	1 seats, 9.85%
Seats won	1	1
Seat change	0	0
Popular vote	28,044	19,894
Percentage	10.83%	7.68%
Swing	▼1.45%p	▼2.17%p
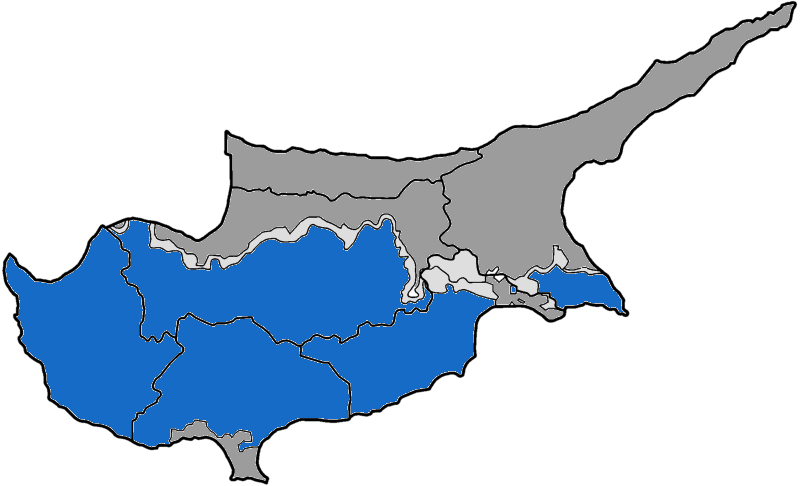
- Largest party by district

Cyprus's component of the 2014 European Parliament election was held on Sunday, 25 May 2014.

In total, 6 Members of the European Parliament were elected from Cyprus.

== Parties ==
Ten parties or coalitions contested the European Parliament election in Cyprus:

- AKEL – Left – New Forces (Progressive Party of Working People)
- Democratic Party (DIKO)
- Democratic Rally (DISY) (in coalition with European Party (EVROKO))
- National Popular Front (ELAM)
- Citizens' Alliance
- EDEK Movement for Social Democracy – Green Party (coalition)
- Action (D.R.A.Sy-Eylem)
- Animal Party Cyprus
- Message of Hope
- Cyprus Socialist Party

There were also eight independent candidates.

== Opinion polls ==
Date(s) conducted	Polling organisation/client	Sample size	DISY-EVROKO	AKEL	DIKO	EDEK-KOP	Others	Lead
15 May 2014	ANT1 TV		25%	16%	8%	5%		9% over AKEL
12 April 2014	CyBC		35%	22%	11%	8%		13% over AKEL

== Results ==
Party	Votes	%	Seats	+/–
Democratic Rally–European Party	97,732	37.75	2	0
AKEL–Left–New Forces	69,852	26.98	2	0
Democratic Party	28,044	10.83	1	0
EDEK–Green Party	19,894	7.68	1	0
Citizens' Alliance	17,549	6.78	0	New
Message of Hope	9,907	3.83	0	New
ELAM	6,957	2.69	0	0
Animal Party Cyprus	2,288	0.88	0	New
Action	2,220	0.86	0	New
Cyprus Socialist Party	278	0.11	0	New
Independents	4,193	1.62	0	New
Total	258,914	100.00	6	0
Valid votes	258,914	97.01		
Invalid/blank votes	7,977	2.99		
Total votes	266,891	100.00		
Registered voters/turnout	606,916	43.97		
Source: MOI

== Elected MEPs ==
The following candidates were elected:

- Democratic Rally – European Party coalition – Eleni Theocharous and Christos Stylianides
- AKEL – Left – New Forces – Takis Hadjigeorgiou and Neoklis Sylikiotis
- Democratic Party – Costas Mavrides
- EDEK – Green Party coalition – Dimitris Papadakis
