= Yiannakis Matsis =

Cypriot politician

Member of the European Parliament
- In office 2004–2009

2nd President of Democratic Rally
- In office 1993–1997
- Preceded by: Glafkos Klerides
- Succeeded by: Nicos Anastasiades

Personal details
- Born: 24 October 1933 (age 92) Palaichori Morphou, Cyprus
- Relatives: Kyriakos Matsis (brother)

Yiannakis Matsis (born 24 October 1933) is a Greek Cypriot politician. He was a Member of the European Parliament (MEP) for the European People's Party from 14 June 2004 until June 2009. He did not stand for re-election in the 2009 European elections.
