= European Party (Cyprus) =

European Party Ευρωπαϊκό Κόμμα
- Leader: Demetris Syllouris
- Founded: 2005
- Dissolved: March 2016
- Merger of: NEO and EvroDi
- Merged into: Solidarity Movement
- Ideology: Greek-Cypriot nationalism Pro-Europeanism
- Political position: Center-right to right-wing
- European affiliation: European Democratic Party
- Colours: Dark blue, Yellow

The European Party (Greek: Ευρωπαϊκό Κόμμα (Ευρωκό), Evropaiko Komma, Evroko) was a political party in Cyprus founded in 2005, largely out of the parties New Horizons and European Democracy. In March 2016, it dissolved to merge into the Solidarity Movement.

The two predecessors were considered the most nationalist, anti-Turkish and anti-immigrant among Greek Cypriot parties. Evroko had a hard-line stance on the Cyprus problem, rejecting any compromise with Turkey or the Turkish-dominated Northern Cyprus, as proposed by the Annan Plan for Cyprus. It supported European integration and maintaining Greek influence in Cyprus. The party supported free market economic policies similar to that of Democratic Rally and the Democratic Party. In electoral campaigns, Evroko stirred up xenophobic ressentiments, suggesting that Greek Cypriots would become a minority in their own country, endangered by criminal, illegal aliens who would steal their jobs.

The party was a member of the European Democratic Party.

In the elections of 21 May 2006, the party won 5.8 percent and 3 out of 56 seats. In the 2009 European parliament election, Evroko won 4.12% of votes. In the 2011 legislative elections the party won 3.88 percent and 2 out of 56 seats. In 2013, Nikos Koutsou, one of the two members of parliament, left the party to become an independent due to disagreement. For the European Parliament election, 2014, the party formed an alliance with the Democratic Rally (DISY). Both seats won by the alliance went to DISY members.
