= Panayiotis Demetriou =

Cypriot politician (born 1939)

Panayiotis Demetriou (Greek: Παναγιώτης Δημητρίου, born 6 May 1939) is a Cypriot politician and former Member of the European Parliament for the European People's Party. He is a member of the Democratic Rally.
