= New Horizons (Cyprus) =

Cypriot political party

New Horizons Νέοι Ορίζοντες
- Abbreviation: NEO
- Chairperson: Nikos Koutsou
- Founded: 18 February 1996
- Dissolved: 3 July 2005
- Merged into: European Party
- Ideology: Right-wing populism Greek Cypriot nationalism Anti-Annan Plan
- Political position: Right-wing
- Colours: Dark Blue; Green

Website
- www.neo.org.cy (archived)

New Horizons (Greek: Νέοι Ορίζοντες) was a radical right-wing populist political party in Cyprus founded in 1996. It aimed for a unitary state of Cyprus and rejected a federation of the Greek Cypriot and the Turkish part. In the legislative elections of 27 May 2001, the party won 3.0% of the popular vote and 1 of 56 seats. In July 2005, it merged with European Democracy to form European Party.

== Election results ==
=== House of Representatives ===
House of Representatives
Election	Total		Total	
Election	No. of votes	%	Seats	±
1996	6,317	1.71	0 / 56	new
2001	12,334	3.00	1 / 56	1

=== President of Cyprus ===
President of Cyprus
Election	Candidate	1st Round			2nd Round			Win
Election	Candidate	Votes	%	Result	Votes	%	Result	Win
1998	Nikos Koutsou	3,625	0.91	6th	Lost in first round			No
2003	Nikos Koutsou	8,771	2.12	4th	Lost in first round			No

=== European Parliament ===
European Parliament
Election	Total			Total	
Election	No. of votes	%	Result	Seats	±
2004	5,501	1.65	7th	0 / 6	new
