= European Democracy (Cyprus) =

European Democracy (Greek: Ευρωπαϊκή Δημοκρατία, Evropaiki Dimokratia, EvroDi) was a political party in Cyprus founded in 2004 out of the coalition For Europe.

For Europe (Greek: Για την Ευρώπη, Gia tin Evropi, GTE) was launched by Yiannakis Matsis to contest the 2004 European Parliamentary Elections.

Yiannakis Matsis was a former (1993-1997) President of the center-right party Democratic Rally (DISY), but disagreed with the party's support for the Annan Plan and decided to fight the elections on a separate ticket. He was joined by deputies Rikkos Erotokritou and Prodromos Prodromou who had been expelled from DISY for opposing the party line on the Annan Plan.

The coalition received 36,112 votes (10.8%) and Matsis was elected as an MEP by a margin of just 37 votes. He subsequently joined the group of the European People's Party-European Democrats (EPP-ED).

The formation of EvroDi was announced on 30 June 2004. On 13 December 2004 the new party elected its leaders during its inaugural meeting. Prodromos Prodromou was elected as President of the Political Bureau, Rikos Erotokritou as vice-president and Christodoulos Taramountas as Assistant Vice President.

In 2005, the party merged with New Horizons (Greek: Νέοι Ορίζοντες) to form the European Party.

== See also ==
- List of political parties in Cyprus
