= EDEK Socialist Party =

EDEK Socialist Party ΕΔΕΚ Σοσιαλιστικό Κόμμα
- Abbreviation: EDEK
- Leader: Sofia Makri Christodoulou
- Founder: Vasos Lyssaridis
- Founded: 1969; 57 years ago
- Headquarters: Nicosia
- Student wing: AGONAS
- Youth wing: EDEK Youth
- Women's wing: Socialist Women's Movement
- Labour wing: DEOK
- Ideology: Social democracy; Greek Cypriot nationalism
- Political position: Centre
- Regional affiliation: PSOM (historical)
- European affiliation: Party of European Socialists
- European Parliament group: Progressive Alliance of Socialists and Democrats
- International affiliation: Progressive Alliance; Socialist International
- Colors: Red, Green, Gold
- House of Representatives: 0 / 56
- European Parliament: 0 / 6
- Municipal Councils: 27 / 443

Website
- edek.org.cy

The EDEK Socialist Party (Greek: ΕΔΕΚ Σοσιαλιστικό Κόμμα, romanized: EDEK Sosialistiko Komma) is a social-democratic political party in Cyprus.

== Overview ==
The party was founded by Vassos Lyssarides in 1969 as the United Democratic Centre Union, EDEK (Greek: Ενιαία Δημοκρατική Ένωση Κέντρου, romanized: Eniaia demokratiki enosi kentrou, ΕΔΕΚ). It was originally a strongly anti-imperialist democratic socialist party with roots in the struggle against British colonial rule, influenced by the philosophies of the Andreas Papandreou left-wing faction within Georgios Papandreou's Centre Union, PASOK, and the 1968 movement.

EDEK, and Lyssarides personally, enjoyed very good relations with Third World socialist leaders and governments, including Hafez al-Assad of Syria, Muammar Gaddafi of Libya and Gamal Abdel Nasser of Egypt.

Since the early 1980s, EDEK has evolved into a European-style social-democratic party. It has however not given up its nationalist and "enotic" orientations. The party changed its name to "Movement for Social Democracy" (Greek: Κίνημα Σοσιαλδημοκρατών) in 2000.

EDEK is led by Marinos Sizopoulos and is a member of the Party of European Socialists and Socialist International.

== History ==
=== Formation and early years ===
Members were drawn from the committee for re-establishment of democracy in Greece, and fighters from Lyssaridis's group during the 1964 clashes between Greek and Turkish Cypriots. Lyssaridis was the personal physician of Archbishop Makarios III, the first president of independent Cyprus, whom the party supported. The party's name was inspired by Greek's Centre Union (EK) of Georgios Papandreou. It positioned itself in "the space inbetween" (neither left nor right). EDEK had links to the international Non-Aligned Movement and was opposed to the right-wing Colonels' regime in Greece. Many of the party's members were part of the armed resistance to the 15 July 1974 coup against Makarios. The leader of the youth section of the party, Doros Loizou, was shot and killed in an attempt to murder Lyssaridis in August 1974.

Several members of the party's youth section (EDEN) with Trotskyist tendencies were expelled between 1979 and 1984, who then formed Aristeri Pteryga (Left Wing).

During the late 1990s, EDEK negotiated with several minor parties, planning to merge all political forces between the communist AKEL and the conservative DISY into a major centrist party. It merged with two small groups, the Renewal Movement and the Independent Personalities Group, in February 2000. This was marked by its name change to "Movement for Social Democracy" (KISOS), which was also intended to bring the party closer to European social democratic parties in terms of both values and appearance. However, only two months after the merger, the members of the Renewal Movement left, citing a "lack of trust" vis-à-vis old EDEK members. Therefore, basically "the new KISOS was the old EDEK".

=== 21st century ===
In the 2001 general elections EDEK won 6.5% of the votes cast and 4 of the 56 seats in the House of Representatives of Cyprus. EDEK was one of the most outspoken opponents of the Annan Plan for the reunification of Cyprus, which was voted on, and ultimately rejected by the Greek Cypriot community in the 2004 referendum. In the elections of 21 May 2006, the first since the referendum, the party increased its vote share to 8.9%, and won 5 out of 56 seats.

EDEK backed Dimitris Christofias of the Progressive Party of Working People (AKEL) in the second round of the February 2008 presidential election. On the proposal of EDEK's Political Bureau, 109 members of its Central Committee voted in favor of supporting Christofias, five voted against, and two abstained. In February 2010 EDEK quit from the government coalition due to its dispute concerning the decisions of Dimitris Christofias in the Cyprus Problem.

The party leader, Yiannakis Omirou, was elected as President of the House of Representatives of the Republic of Cyprus, following the 2011 general elections, in which EDEK obtained 8.93% of the votes and five seats in Parliament.

In the February 2013 presidential election, EDEK backed the independent candidate Yiorgos Lillikas. The former minister of foreign affairs in Tassos Papadopoulos' cabinet. In the second round, EDEK decided not to back any other candidate, neither the DISY candidate Nicos Anastasiades, or AKEL candidate Stavros Malas.

In January 2015, House President Yiannakis Omirou resigned from EDEK's leadership. In March he was succeeded by his deputy Marinos Sizopoulos.

In November 2022, the party's name was changed to EDEK Socialist Party.

In the 2026 legislative election, the party lost all its seats in the House of Representatives, marking the first time since the party entered parliament in 1970 that EDEK has been without representation in the House, ending a 56-year presence in parliament.

== Election results ==
=== Parliament ===
House of Representatives
Election	Votes			Seats	
Election	#	%	Rank	#	±
1970	12,996	8.3	4th	2 / 35	new
1976	With DIKO and AKEL			4 / 35	▲2
1981	23,772	8.2	4th	3 / 35	▼1
1985	35,371	11.1	4th	6 / 56	▲3
1991	37,264	10.9	4th	7 / 56	▲1
1996	30,033	8.1	4th	5 / 56	▼2
2001	26,767	6.5	4th	4 / 56	▼1
2006	37,533	8.9	4th	5 / 56	▲1
2011	36,113	8.9	4th	5 / 56	0
2016	21,732	6.2	4th	3 / 56	▼2
2021 (Note: Run with Citizens' Alliance.)	24,022	6.7	5th	4 / 56	▲1
2026	12,099	3.3	7th	0 / 56	▼4

=== European Parliament ===
European Parliament
Election	Votes			Seats	
Election	#	%	Rank	#	±
2004	36,075	10.79	5th	0 / 6	new
2009	30,169	9.85	4th	1 / 6	▲1
2014 (Note: Run with Movement of Ecologists – Citizens' Cooperation.)	19,894	7.68	4th	1 / 6	0
2019	29,715	10.58	4th	1 / 6	0
2024	18,681	5.07	6th	0 / 6	▼1

== Presidents of the Movement ==
- 1969–2001: Dr. Vasos Lyssaridis
- 2001–2015: Yiannakis Omirou
- 2015–2025: Marinos Sizopoulos
- 2025–2026 : Nikos Anastasiou
- 2026– :Sofia Makri Christodoulou
