= Action =

Action may refer to:

- Action (philosophy), something which is done by a person
- Action principles the heart of fundamental physics
- Action (narrative), a literary mode
- Action fiction, a type of genre fiction
- Action game, a genre of video game

== Film ==
- Action film, a genre of film
- Action (1921 film), a film by John Ford
- Action (1980 film), a film by Tinto Brass
- Action 3D, a 2013 Telugu language film
- Action (2019 film), a Kollywood film.

== Music ==
- Action (music), a characteristic of a stringed instrument
- Action (piano), the mechanism which drops the hammer on the string when a key is pressed
- The Action, a 1960s band

=== Albums ===
- Action (B'z album) (2007)
- Action! (Desmond Dekker album) (1968)
- Action Action Action or Action, a 1965 album by Jackie McLean
- Action! (Oh My God album) (2002)
- Action (Oscar Peterson album) (1968)
- Action (Punchline album) (2004)
- Action (Question Mark & the Mysterians album) (1967)
- Action (Uppermost album) (2011)
- Action (EP), a 2012 EP by NU'EST
- Action, a 1984 album by Kiddo

=== Songs ===
- "Action" (Freddy Cannon song) (1965), the theme song to the TV series Where the Action Is
- "Action" (Sweet song) (1975), covered by various artists
- "Action", a version of "Feeling This" by Blink-182
- "Action", a 1994 song by Terror Fabulous featuring Nadine Sutherland
- "Action", a 2020 song by Black Eyed Peas from Translation
- "Action", a 1984 song by The Fits
- "Action", a 1960 song by Lance Fortune
- "Action", a 1972 song by Scorpions from Lonesome Crow
- "Action", a 1978 song by Streetheart from Meanwhile Back in Paris...
- "Action", a 1988 song by Pearly Gates
- "Action", a 1988 song by Girlschool from Take a Bite
- "Action", a 1989 song by Gorky Park from Gorky Park (album)
- "Action", a 2003 song by Powerman 5000 from Transform
- "Actions", a 1980 song by The Stingrays
- "Action Action Action Action Action", a 2008 song by We Are the Physics from We Are the Physics Are OK at Music

== Literature ==
- Action (comics), a British comic book published in 1976–1977
- Action Comics, a DC Comics comic book series
- Action: A Book about Sex, a 2016 book by Amy Rose Spiegel
- Action (newspaper), a newspaper of Oswald Mosley's British Union of Fascists
- Hareket, conservative magazine in Turkish which was named after action theory

== People ==
- Action Bronson (born 1983), American rapper, reality television star, author, and talk show host

== Television and radio ==
- Action television a genre of television programming
- Action (Canadian TV channel)
- Action (French TV channel)
- Action Channel, a Japanese television channel
- The Action Channel (US TV channel), a subsidiary of Luken Communications
- Action (TV series), a comedy series on Fox in 1999–2000
- CBS Action (2009–2018), now known as CBS Justice
- Sky Sports Action, a TV channel
- Action Chugger, a locomotive in Chuggington

== Theatre ==
- Action (theatre), a principle in Western theatre practice
- Action (play), a 1975 play by Sam Shepard

== Organizations ==
=== Businesses ===
- Action (store), a Dutch discount store chain with branches in many European countries
- Action (supermarkets), an Australian supermarket chain
- Actions Semiconductor, a Chinese semiconductor company
- ACTION, an Australian public transport company
- The Action Network (branded as Action), an American sports betting analytics company

=== Political parties ===
- Action (Cypriot political party), a Cypriot political alliance
- Action (Greek political party), a Greek political party
- Action (Italian political party), an Italian political party

=== Other organizations ===
- ACTION (U.S. government agency), a former US government federal domestic volunteer agency

== Science, technology, and mathematics ==
- Action (physics), an attribute of the dynamics of a physical system
- Action at a distance, nonlocal interaction in physics
- Group action
  - Continuous group action
  - Semigroup action
- Ring action
- Action (firearms), the mechanism that manipulates cartridges and/or seals the breech
- Action! (programming language), for Atari 8-bit computers
- Action (UML), in the Unified Modeling Language
- Diia, a brand of e-governance in Ukraine

== Other uses ==
- Lawsuit or action

== See also ==
- Action Force (disambiguation)
- Action Jackson (disambiguation)
- Action Man (disambiguation)
- Action theory (disambiguation)
- Acteon (disambiguation)
- Actaeon (disambiguation)
- Acción (disambiguation)
- Structural load, forces, deformations, or accelerations applied to a structure or its components
