= List of people legally executed in Tasmania =

This is a list of people executed in Van Diemen's Land (1803-1856), the Colony of Tasmania (1856-1901) and since 1901, the federated island state of Tasmania, Australia. It lists people who were executed by British (and from 1901, Australian) authorities within the modern-day boundaries of Tasmania. For people executed in other parts of Australia, see the sidebar.

== 1800s to 1810s ==
- Thomas England – April 1806 – Private of 102nd Regiment, hanged at York Town, Port Dalrymple for his part in theft from Government Stores there on 18 January 1806.
- James Keating/Keling – 14 April 1806 – Hanged at Hobart for his part in theft from Government Stores at Port Dalrymple on 18 January 1806.
- Terence Flynn – 14 July 1810 – Hanged in the Queenborough district (Sandy Bay) for murder
- Job Stokes – 14 July 1810 – Hanged in the Queenborough district for housebreaking
- William Stevens – 25 May 1815 – Hanged at Hobart for stealing jewellery and other articles from Arnold Frisk at Pittwater. Hung in chains
- Thomas Morley/Mauley – 6 June 1815 – Hanged at Hobart for the murder of Thomas Connelly
- Richard McGuire – 7 June 1815 – Hanged at Hobart for the murder of William Carlisle and James O'Burn at New Norfolk. Hung in chains
- Hugh Burn – 29 June 1815 – Hanged at Hobart for the murder of William Carlisle and James O'Burn at New Norfolk. Hung in chains
- Richard Collier – 26 January 1818 – Hanged on the New Town road, Hobart, for the 1815 murder of Carlisle and O'Burn at New Norfolk
- George Gray – 11 June 1818 – Hanged at Hobart for murder of John Evans (real name Charles Bell) at York Plains
- William Trimm – 11 June 1818 – Hanged at Hobart for sheep-stealing in the Richmond district

== 1820s ==
=== 1820 to 1823 ===
- Thomas Baley/Bailey – 28 July 1820 – Hanged at Hobart for sheep stealing
- John Brady – 28 July 1820 – Hanged at Hobart for sheep stealing
- Edward Brady – 28 April 1821 – Hanged at Hobart for robbery of Alfred Thrupp's property at Restdown (Risdon)
- James Flinn/Flynn – 28 April 1821 – Hanged at Hobart for robbery of Alfred Thrupp's property at Restdown (Risdon)
- John Higgins – 28 April 1821 – Hanged at Hobart for armed robbery and firing on the King's troops.
- John Hill – 28 April 1821 – Hanged at Hobart for armed robbery and firing on the King's troops.
- Robert Hunter – 28 April 1821 – Hanged at scaffold erected at the top of Macquarie Street, Hobart Town, for robbery of Alfred Thrupp's property at Restdown (Risdon)
- Thomas Kenny – 28 April 1821 – Hanged at Hobart for armed robbery and firing on the King's troops.
- John McGennis/McGinnis – 28 April 1821 – Hanged at Hobart for sheep-stealing
- John Oliver – 28 April 1821 – Hanged at Hobart for cattle-stealing
- Joseph Potaskie – 28 April 1821 – Hanged at Hobart for robbery and rape of Sarah Thrupp at Restdown (Risdon)
- Michael Riley – 28 April 1821 – Hanged at Hobart for armed robbery and firing on the King's troops.
- Robert Gillaird/Gillard – 30 May 1821 – Hanged at Launceston for the armed robbery in the house of William Chapman
- Patrick Kane/Kean – 30 May 1821 – Hanged at Launceston armed robbery in the house of William Chapman
- William Lloyd – 30 May 1821 – Hanged at Launceston armed robbery in the house of William Chapman
- Daniel McCarthy – 30 May 1821 – Hanged at Launceston for armed robbery in the house of John Cummings
- John Morell – 30 May 1821 – Hanged at Launceston for stealing in the Norfolk Plains district
- William Hyder – 3 June 1821 – Hanged at George Town for armed robbery from the house of James Hill
- James Norris – 3 June 1821 – Hanged at George Town for armed robbery from the house of James Hill
- Thomas Gutteridge – 4 June 1821 – Hanged at George Town for armed robberies
- William Smith – 25 April 1822 – Hanged at the Cascade end of Macquarie Street, Hobart, for sheep stealing.
- John Williams – 25 April 1822 – Hanged at the Cascade end of Macquarie Street, Hobart, for sheep stealing.
- Edward Griffith - 16 August 1822 - Hanged at Hobart for armed robbery
- Richard Oldrey - 16 August 1822 - Hanged at Hobart for armed robbery
- James Parker - 16 August 1822 - Hanged at Hobart for armed robbery
- Michael Yorke - 16 August 1822 - Hanged at Hobart for armed robbery
- James Smith – 12 April 1823 – Hanged at Hobart for sheep-stealing. (Smith actually cheated the hangman by "suspending himself by a silk handkerchief from a bar...in the room in which he was confined")
- George Richardson – 14 April 1823 – Hanged at Hobart for sheep-stealing
- Robert Oldham/Holdham – 14 April 1823– Hanged at Hobart for sheep-stealing
- William Davis – 14 April 1823 – Hanged at Hobart for sheep-stealing
- Ralph Churlton – 14 April 1823 – Hanged at Hobart for sheep-stealing

=== 1824 to 1825 ===
- Alexander Pearce – 19 July 1824 – Hanged at Hobart for the murder of Thomas Cox. Cannibalised Thomas Bodenham and John Mather (both killed by Robert Greenhill); Confessed to killing and cannibalising Robert Greenhill and Thomas Cox.
- Thomas Butler – 22 July 1824 – Hanged at Hobart for sheep-stealing.
- Patrick Connell – 22 July 1824 – Hanged at Hobart for burglary of the home of HW Mason and stealing guns and powder.
- James Tierney – 22 July 1824 – Hanged at Hobart for robbery from the person of Patrick Brodie and Thomas Osborne of a gun and watch, and robbery from the home of HW Mason.
- Isaac Walker – 22 July 1824 – Hanged at Hobart for robbery from the person of Patrick Brodie and Thomas Osborne of a gun and watch, and robbery from the home of HW Mason.
- John Thompson – 22 July 1824 – Hanged at Hobart for robbery from the person of Patrick Brodie and Thomas Osborne of a gun and watch, and robbery from the home of HW Mason.
- George Gardner – 8 September 1824 – Hanged at George Town for killing a steer with intent to steal
- Arthur Dicker – 8 September 1824 – Hanged at George Town for killing a steer with intent to steal
- Thomas Taylor – 8 September 1824 – Hanged at George Town for the murder of John Street at Abbotsfield
- Luke Fowler – 8 September 1824 – Hanged at George Town for the murder of John Street at Abbotsfield
- Charles Kimberley – 8 September 1824 – Hanged at George Town for the murder of Judith Burke
- James Crawford – 8 September 1824 – Hanged at George Town for robbery and putting in fear
- John Bimms – 8 September 1824 – Hanged at George Town for robbery and putting in fear
- Job Corfield – 8 September 1824 – Hanged at George Town for robbery and putting in fear
- Matthew Stephenson – 15 September 1824 – Hanged at George Town for robbery and putting in fear
- John Twiggs – 15 September 1824 – Hanged at George Town for robbery and putting in fear
- Thomas Hudson – 28 January 1825 – Hanged at Macquarie Harbour for the murder of Robert Esk
- William Allen – 28 January 1825 – Hanged at Macquarie Harbour for the murder of William Saul at Birch's Bay
- Francis Oates – 28 January 1825 – Hanged at Macquarie Harbour for the murder of James Williamson
- Henry McConnell – 25 February 1825 – Hanged at Hobart for robbery
- Jeremiah Ryan – 25 February 1825 – Hanged at Hobart for murder and robbery
- Charles Ryder – 25 February 1825 – Hanged at Hobart for murder and robbery
- James Bryant – 25 February 1825 – Hanged at Hobart for murder
- Black Jack (or Jack Roberts) – 25 February 1825 – Indigenous. Hanged at Hobart for the murder of Patrick McCarthy
- Musquito – 25 February 1825 – Indigenous (Eora). Hanged at Hobart for a murder at Grindstone Bay
- Peter Thackery – 25 February 1825 – Hanged at Hobart for burglary and putting in bodily fear
- John Logan – 25 February 1825 – Hanged at Hobart for attempted shooting murder of William Shoobridge. The victim was saved because the bullet struck a ruler in his pocket.
- Samuel Fielding – 26 February 1825 – Hanged at Hobart for sheep-stealing
- James Chamberlain – 26 February 1825 – Hanged at Hobart for sheep-stealing
- Stephen Lear – 26 February 1825 – Hanged at Hobart for burglary at the Surveyor-General's
- Henry Fry – 26 February 1825 – Hanged at Hobart for burglary at the Surveyor-General's
- John Reed Riddle – 31 August 1825 – Hanged at Hobart for murder of George Fildes in Goulburn St. He confessed to the murder of both his ex-wives.
- Thomas Peacock – 31 August 1825 – Hanged at Hobart for murder of Constable Craggs
- William Buckley – 31 August 1825 – Hanged at Hobart for robbery
- Joseph Broadhead – 31 August 1825 – Hanged at Hobart for robbery
- John Everis – 31 August 1825 – Hanged at Hobart for robbery
- John Godliman – 7 September 1825 – Hanged at Hobart for sheep-stealing and the murder of Samuel Hunt at Fourteen-Tree Plain, near Jericho.
- Jonas Dobson – 12 December 1825 – Hanged at Hobart for the murder of stock-keeper William Mason at the Eastern Marshes (East of Jericho)

=== 1826 ===
- John Johnson – 6 January 1826 – Hanged at Hobart for burglary at Mr. Barnes'
- Samuel Longman (or Longworth) – 6 January 1826 – Hanged at Hobart for burglary and putting in fear
- Charles Wigley – 6 January 1826 – Hanged at Hobart for house breaking
- James Major – 6 January 1826 – Hanged at Hobart for stealing an ox
- William Pollock – 6 January 1826 – Hanged at Hobart for sheep-stealing
- George Harden – 6 January 1826 – Hanged at Hobart for sheep-stealing
- William Preece – 6 January 1826 – Hanged at Hobart for robberies
- James McCabe – 7 January 1826 – Hanged at Hobart for murder, robberies
- Richard Brown – 7 January 1826 – Hanged at Hobart for sheep-stealing
- James Brown – 7 January 1826 – Hanged at Hobart for sheep-stealing
- John Green – 7 January 1826 – Hanged at Hobart for sheep-stealing
- Thomas Bosworth – 7 January 1826 – Hanged at Hobart for burglary and putting in fear
- Richard Miller – 7 January 1826 – Hanged at Hobart for burglary and putting in fear
- William Craven – 7 January 1826 – Hanged at Hobart for burglary and putting in fear
- Thomas Bell - 17 February 1826 – Hanged at Launceston for sheep-stealing
- James Eales – 17 February 1826 – Hanged at Launceston for sheep-stealing and robbery
- William Eales – 17 February 1826 – Hanged at Launceston for sheep-stealing and robbery
- Richard Holtham - 17 February 1826 – Hanged at Launceston for sheep-stealing
- Thomas Pawley - 17 February 1826 – Hanged at Launceston for robbery and putting in fear.
- Matthew Brady – 4 May 1826 – Hanged at Hobart for stealing from the person of William Andrews
- Patrick Bryant – 4 May 1826 – Hanged at Hobart for Murder, robberies
- John Perry – 4 May 1826 – Hanged at Hobart for stealing from the dwelling of Thomas Railton. Killed and with Thomas Jeffrey cannibalised Edward Russell.
- Thomas Jeffrey – 4 May 1826 – Hanged at Hobart for the murder of Magnus Baker/Bakie. With John Perry, cannibalised Edward Russell.
- John Thompson – 4 May 1826 – Hanged at Hobart for the murder of Margaret Smith at the Watch-House
- Samuel Hodgetts – 5 May 1826 – Hanged at Hobart for Murder, robberies
- James McKenney – 5 May 1826 – Hanged at Hobart for Murder, robberies
- James Goodwin – 5 May 1826 – Hanged at Hobart for Murder, robberies
- John Gregory – 5 May 1826 – Hanged at Hobart for Murder, robberies
- William Tilley – 5 May 1826 – Hanged at Hobart for Murder, robberies
- William Brown – 5 May 1826 – Hanged at Hobart for Murder, robberies
- Thomas Dunnings – 13 September 1826 – Hanged at Hobart for the murder of Alexander Simpson at Pittwater
- Edward Everett – 13 September 1826 – Hanged at Hobart for the murder of Alexander Simpson at Pittwater
- William Smith – 13 September 1826 – Hanged at Hobart for the murder of Alexander Simpson at Pittwater
- John Taylor – 13 September 1826 – Hanged at Hobart for absconding from Macquarie Harbour and robbing soldiers of their arms
- George Watters – 13 September 1826 – Hanged at Hobart for absconding from Macquarie Harbour and robbing soldiers of their arms
- Jack – 13 September 1826 – Indigenous. Hanged for the murder of Thomas Colley at Oyster Bay.
- Dick – 13 September 1826 – Indigenous. Hanged for the murder of Thomas Colley at Oyster Bay. Dick was kept apart before the execution as he was suffering from leprosy.
- George Brace – 15 September 1826 – Hanged at Hobart for robbery
- John McFarlane – 15 September 1826 – Hanged at Hobart for absconding into the woods and robbing William Holdship at Sandy Bay
- James Edwards – 15 September 1826 – Hanged at Hobart for absconding into the woods and robbing William Holdship at Sandy Bay
- Thomas Balfour – 15 September 1826 – Hanged at Hobart for absconding into the woods and robbing William Holdship at Sandy Bay
- John Dadd – 15 September 1826 – Hanged at Hobart for burglary at Ross
- John Clark – 15 September 1826 – Hanged at Hobart for burglary at Ross
- Patrick Brown – 15 September 1826 – Hanged at Hobart for sheep-stealing
- John Pearson (Penson) – 18 September 1826 – Hanged at Hobart for burglary from Richard Worley, butcher, Elizabeth St
- James Rowles – 18 September 1826 – Hanged at Hobart for robbing his employer John Dunn's shop, Elizabeth St
- Timothy Swinscow – 18 September 1826 – Hanged at Hobart for robbing Mrs. Till at New Norfolk
- William Wickens – 18 September 1826 – Hanged at Hobart for robbing Mrs. Till at New Norfolk
- George Farquharson – 18 September 1826 – Hanged at Hobart for sheep-stealing at Jericho
- Robert Cable – 18 September 1826 – Hanged at Hobart for sheep-stealing from the Sherwin flock on the Clyde
- Thomas Savell – 18 September 1826 – Hanged at Hobart for sheep-stealing from David Lord in the Pitt Water district
- John Davis – 18 September 1826 – Hanged at Hobart for sheep-stealing from David Lord in the Pitt Water district
- John Cruitt – 18 September 1826 – Hanged at Hobart for sheep-stealing from David Lord in the Pitt Water district

=== 1827 ===
- Robert Grant – 8 January 1827 – Hanged at Hobart for sheep stealing from Edmund Bryant near Jericho.
- George Bentley – 8 January 1827 – Hanged at Hobart for sheep stealing from Edmund Bryant near Jericho.
- William Crest – 8 January 1827 – Hanged at Hobart for sheep stealing from Edmund Bryant near Jericho.
- William Evans – 8 January 1827 – Hanged at Hobart for assault and robbery at New Town of John Sayers 'the broom-maker'.
- Peter Rice – 8 January 1827 – Hanged at Hobart for shooting at John Swift in Murray Street, Hobart.
- Patrick Dunne – 8 January 1827 – Hanged at Hobart for armed robbery at Kingston.
- Charles Burgh – 9 January 1827 – Hanged at Hobart for horse stealing.
- Henry Strong – 9 January 1827 – Hanged at Hobart for stealing in the dwelling of James Reid.
- Michael Brown – 9 January 1827 – Hanged at Hobart for stealing in the dwelling of James Reid.
- George Ellis – 9 January 1827 – Hanged at Hobart for stealing in the dwelling of James Reid.
- William Birt – 9 January 1827 – Hanged at Hobart for stealing in the dwelling of James Reid.
- William Hoadley – 9 January 1827 – Hanged at Hobart for stealing in the dwelling of James Reid.
- William Tuffnell – 19 February 1827 – Hanged at Launceston for the rape of nine-year-old Ellen Briggs
- Richard Gill – 19 February 1827 – Hanged at Launceston for burglary
- Edward Howe – 19 February 1827 – Hanged at Launceston for highway robbery near Scottsdale
- Joseph Horsefield – 19 February 1827 – Hanged at Launceston for burglary
- James Gurd – 19 February 1827 – Hanged at Launceston for burglary in the Norfolk Plains district
- William Ashford – 19 February 1827 – Hanged at Launceston for burglary in the Norfolk Plains district
- Andrew Winchester – 19 February 1827 – Hanged at Launceston for burglary in the Macquarie River district
- William Haywood – 19 February 1827 – Hanged at Launceston for the murder of Christopher McRae at Lake River
- Henry Oakley – 3 July 1827 - Hanged at Hobart for burglary from Mr Brodie on the Clyde
- Thomas Bidwell Child – 3 July 1827 – Hanged at Hobart for forgery
- John Wright – 3 July 1827 – Hanged at Hobart for robbery at Old Beach
- John Clayton – 3 July 1827 – Hanged at Hobart for sheep-stealing
- George Dunning (or Dunhill) – 3 July 1827 – Hanged at Hobart for sheep-stealing
- William Longhurst – 3 July 1827 – Hanged at Hobart for sheep-stealing
- Daniel McPherson – 3 July 1827 – Hanged at Hobart for burglary of the home of Henry Bye, North Hobart
- Martin Higgins – 3 July 1827 – Hanged at Hobart for stealing in a dwelling house of Henry Bye at North Hobart, at noon-day
- James Horsefield – 23 August 1827 – Hanged at Hobart for armed robbery at Stanfield's, Ralph's Bay
- George Metcalfe – 23 August 1827 – Hanged at Hobart for armed robbery at Stanfield's, Ralph's Bay
- James Coates – 23 August 1827 – Hanged at Hobart for armed robbery at Stanfield's, Ralph's Bay
- John Brown (the Mariner) – 23 August 1827 – Hanged at Hobart for armed robbery at Stanfield's, Ralph's Bay
- John Lee – 23 August 1827 – Hanged at Hobart for armed robbery at Stanfield's, Ralph's Bay
- George Braithwaite – 23 August 1827 – Hanged at Hobart for armed robbery at Stanfield's, Ralph's Bay
- John Brown (the Bricklayer) – 23 August 1827 – Hanged at Hobart for armed robbery at Stanfield's, Ralph's Bay
- Thomas Davis (real name Roberts) – 23 August 1827 – Hanged at Hobart for armed robbery at Stanfield's, Ralph's Bay
- Matthew McCullum – 23 August 1827 – Hanged at Hobart for armed robbery at Stanfield's, Ralph's Bay
- Humphrey Oulton – 15 November 1827 – Hanged at Launceston for the theft of a sheep
- Abraham Abrahams – 15 November 1827 – Hanged at Launceston for the theft of a mare from the Gourlay property on the Clyde
- William Shepherd – 15 November 1827 – Hanged at Launceston for burglary from the home of Ralph Compton on the Norfolk Plains (Longford)
- George Lacey – 17 December 1827 – Hanged at Hobart for the murder of Constable George Rix at Macquarie Harbour
- John Ward ("Flash Jack") – 17 December 1827 – Hanged at Hobart for his role in the Rix murder
- Samuel Measures – 17 December 1827 – Hanged at Hobart for his role in the Rix murder
- William Jenkins – 17 December 1827 – Hanged at Hobart for his role in the Rix murder
- James Reid – 17 December 1827 – Hanged at Hobart for his role in the Rix murder
- John Williams – 17 December 1827 – Hanged at Hobart for his role in the Rix murder
- James Kirk – 17 December 1827 – Hanged at Hobart for his role in the Rix murder
- John McMillan – 17 December 1827 – Hanged at Hobart for his role in the Rix murder
- John Mcguire – 17 December 1827 – Hanged at Hobart for his role in the Rix murder
- James Conhope – 17 December 1827 – Hanged at Hobart for the rape of a six-year-old (convict per Minerva)

=== 1828 to 1829 ===
- George Driver – 30 January 1828 – Hanged at Hobart for the murder of John Onely at Macquarie Harbour
- Samuel Higgins – 30 January 1828 – Hanged at Hobart for the murder of John Onely at Macquarie Harbour
- William Fowler – 29 February 1828 – Hanged at Hobart for the murder of a little girl named Emma Groom
- Henry Williams – 29 February 1828 – Hanged at Hobart for the murder of Constable Malcolm Logan, North-East of Green Ponds (Kempton)
- Thomas Pearson – 23 May 1828 – Hanged at Hobart for armed robbery and burglary of Anthony Kemp at the Cross Marsh (Melton Mowbray)
- Phelim Crampsey (alias Bonner) – 23 May 1828 – Hanged at Hobart for assault and robbery on James Collins
- Edward Hangan – 23 May 1828 – Hanged at Hobart for robbery of a gun from James McLanachan
- John Grimes – 23 May 1828 – Hanged at Hobart for shooting with intent at George Marshall near Sorell
- Thomas Collins – 23 May 1828 – Hanged at Hobart for burglary at the home of George Cartwright
- Edward Burke – 23 May 1828 – Hanged at Hobart for robbery
- Abraham Aaron – 1 August 1828 – Hanged at Hobart for robbery at Maria Island
- Philip Large – 15 February 1829 – Hanged at Launceston for the rape of eleven year-old Margaret Stewart
- John Morrison – 15 February 1829 – Hanged at Launceston for arson
- John Gibson – 15 February 1829 – Hanged at Launceston for robbery
- Charles Williams – 15 February 1829 – Hanged at Launceston for armed robbery
- William Ashton – 15 February 1829 – Hanged at Launceston for robbery
- Joseph Moulds – 15 February 1829 – Hanged at Launceston for robbery
- William Baker – 15 February 1829 – Hanged at Launceston for robbery
- John Baker – 17 February 1829 – Hanged at Launceston for sheep stealing
- Bernard Shields – 17 February 1829 – Hanged at Launceston for sheep stealing (convict per Minerva)
- Daniel Mackie – 17 February 1829 – Hanged at Launceston for sheep stealing
- Daniel Leary – 17 February 1829 – Hanged at Launceston for bullock stealing
- Thomas Rogers – 17 February 1829 – Hanged at Launceston for burglary
- George Palmer – 17 February 1829 – Hanged at Launceston for armed robbery
- Daniel Brown – 2 March 1829 – Hanged at Hobart for murder of Thomas Stopford at Macquarie Harbour
- John Salmon – 2 March 1829 – Hanged at Hobart for murder of Thomas Stopford at Macquarie Harbour
- John Leach – 9 March 1829 – Hanged at Hobart for the murder of Elizabeth Perkins
- Robert Bourke – 10 July 1829 – Hanged at Hobart for being illegally at large after sentence of transportation and before the expiration of his sentence
- William Madden – 10 July 1829 – Hanged at Hobart for armed robbery
- William Perring – 10 July 1829 – Hanged at Hobart for robbery from the person and being illegally at large after sentence of transportation and before the expiration of his sentence

== 1830s ==
=== 1830 to 1831 ===
- John Mayo – 11 January 1830 – Hanged at Hobart for the murder of James Bailey Jones at Macquarie Harbour
- William Wilkes – 23 January 1830 – Hanged at Hobart for the murder of Dennis Alcoloret on Bruny Island in Oct 1827
- Hugh Campbell – 3 February 1830 – Soldier of the 63rd Regiment, hanged at Hobart for the murder of Jonathan Brett
- Michael Best – 11 February 1830 – Hanged at Hobart for the murder of Richard Garner at Hamilton
- John Oxley – 24 February 1830 – Hanged at Hobart for the murder of Susan Corfield
- John Killen – 26 February 1830 – Hanged at Hobart for sheep stealing
- Samuel Jones – 26 February 1830 – Hanged at Hobart for sheep stealing
- Joseph Fogg – 26 February 1830 – Hanged at Hobart for sodomy.
- Thomas Goodwin – 26 February 1830 – Hanged at Hobart for cutting the throat of Ann Hamilton with intent to kill
- George Appleby – 22 March 1830 – Hanged at Hobart for being illegally at large after sentence of transportation and before the expiration thereof.
- Mary McLauchlan – 19 April 1830 – Hanged at Hobart for the murder of her new born son. The first woman executed in Van Diemen's Land/Tasmania.
- Edmund Daniels – 14 May 1830 – Hanged at Hobart for armed robbery. (Convict, Asia 3rd)
- John Deighton – 14 May 1830 – Hanged at Hobart for armed robbery. (Convict - Earl St Vincent)
- James Child – 14 May 1830 – Hanged at Hobart for armed robbery. (Convict - Chapman 2nd)
- Andrew Bates – 14 May 1830 – Hanged at Hobart for armed robbery. (Convict - Phoenix)
- Edward Ladywig – 14 May 1830 – Hanged at Hobart for robbery (Convict - Phoenix)
- Joseph Ellis – 14 May 1830 – Hanged at Hobart for sheep stealing (Convict - Dromedary)
- Andrew McCue/McKew – 17 May 1830 – Hanged at Hobart for burglary of clothing and money from the house of John Robins (Convict Indefatigable/Kangaroo)
- George Thomson/Thompson – 17 May 1830 - Hanged at Hobart for burglary in the home of TG Gregson (Convict - Lady Harewood)
- Edward Sweeney – 30 June 1830 – Hanged at Launceston for the murder of his wife Mary Sweeney
- William Thomas – 30 June 1830 – Hanged at Launceston for the murder of John Warne
- Samuel Cowden - 7 July 1830 - Hanged at Launceston for burglary in the dwelling burglary of dwelling of Robert Pringle Stewart.
- Thomas Laughton/Lawson - 7 July 1830 - Hanged at Launceston for burglary in the dwelling burglary of dwelling of Robert Pringle Stewart.
- John Morton/Moreton - 7 July 1830 - Hanged at Launceston for burglary in the dwelling burglary of dwelling of Robert Pringle Stewart.
- William Sainter - 7 July 1830 - Hanged at Launceston for burglary in the dwelling burglary of dwelling of Robert Pringle Stewart.
- John Bradey/Brady - 10 July 1830 - Hanged at Launceston for the rape of a five-year-old child
- William Messenger – 10 July 1830 – Hanged at Launceston for the rape of a five-year-old child
- Richard Udall/Udal/Yewdle – 10 July 1830 – Hanged at Launceston for the rape of a five-year-old child
- Charles Routley – 17 September 1830 – Hanged at Hobart for the murder of John Buckley at Carlton River
- William Nottingham – 24 December 1830 – Hanged at Hobart for burglary of the dwelling of Mrs Gould .
- William Wilson – 24 December 1830 – Hanged at Hobart for attempted murder of William Carlow.
- William Jones – 3 August 1831 – Hanged at Hobart for attempted murder of William Carlow.
- Edward Broughton (28) – 5 August 1831 – Hanged at Hobart for being illegally at large while under sentence of transportation. (Absconded from Macquarie Harbour; murdered and cannibalised Richard Hutchinson and William Coventry , and cannibalised Patrick Feagan/Fagan after Matthew McAvoy killed him.)
- Matthew Macavoy – 5 August 1831 – Hanged at Hobart for being illegally at large while under sentence of transportation. (Absconded from Macquarie Harbour; cannibalised Richard Hutchinson after Edward Broughton killed him, cannibalised William Coventry and Patrick Feagan/Fagan .)
- John Somers – 23 December 1831 – Hanged at Hobart for rape of a child aged under ten years.

=== 1832 to 1834 ===
- Elijah Alder – 19 March 1832 – Hanged at Hobart for the murder of Benjamin Horne, near Ross
- John Cockshott – 16 April 1832 – Hanged at Hobart for murdering Richard Crozier his fellow absconder from Macquarie Harbour.
- James Camm – 30 April 1832 – Hanged at Hobart for piracy ; he was involved in the Cyprus mutiny in 1829
- Robert Gordon – 30 April 1832 – Hanged at Hobart for burglary in the dwelling of Lachlan Reynolds
- James Medcalf – 30 April 1832 – Hanged at Hobart for assault and robbery from the person of John Nunn
- Joseph Colvin – 14 May 1832 – Hanged at Hobart for aiding and abetting John Gow in shooting John Corrigan
- John Gow – 14 May 1832 – Hanged at Hobart for shooting and wounding John Corrigan
- John Towers – 5 June 1832 – Hanged at Hobart for the murder of John Kellerman at Avoca
- James Fletcher – 5 June 1832 – Hanged at Hobart for the murder of John Kellerman at Avoca
- Daniel Cann – 22 June 1832 – Hanged at Hobart for being illegally at large.
- John Chadwick – 22 June 1832 – Hanged at Hobart for robbery in the dwelling of George Briscoe
- Thomas Fleet – 17 October 1832 – Hanged at Hobart for the attempted murder of William Waring Saxton at Port Arthur
- William Evans – 17 October 1832 – Hanged at Hobart for the attempted murder of George S. Edwards at the New Bridge, at Hestercombe (Austin's Ferry)
- John Clements ('Jack the Lagger') – 4 January 1833 – Hanged at Hobart for being illegally at large.
- Robert Dutchess/Duchess – 4 January 1833 – Hanged at Hobart for bestiality with a mare
- John Glover – 4 January 1833 – Hanged at Hobart for the rape of 3 girls aged 8, 10 and 12
- Simon Gowan – 4 January 1833 – Hanged at Hobart for the rape of 3 girls aged 8, 10 and 12
- William Higham – 4 January 1833 – Hanged at Hobart for being illegally at large .
- John Jones - 16 April 1833 - Hanged at Hobart for bestiality
- Thomas Ansell – 1 November 1833 – Hanged at Hobart for robbery
- Jonathan Dark - 1 November 1833 - Hanged at Hobart for burglary in Argyle St
- John Berry - 4 December 1833 - Hanged at Launceston for shooting with intent to kill.
- Robert Hutton - 4 December 1833 - hanged at Launceston for wounding with intent to kill.
- John Long - 24 Dec 1833 - Hanged at Hobart for assault and robbery of John Langford
- George Robinson – 24 December 1833 – Hanged for assault and robbery of John Langford.
- Samuel Dyke (per Roslyn Castle) – 21 January 1834 – Hanged at Hobart for burglary of the dwelling of Mrs. McTavish
- Thomas Dawson – 10 March 1834 – Hanged at Launceston for burglary of the dwelling of James Weavers
- Samuel Newman – 10 March 1834 – Hanged at Launceston for burglary of the dwelling of James Weavers
- William Ward – 10 March 1834 – Hanged at Launceston for burglary of the dwelling of James Weavers
- Joseph Deane/Dean – 26 March 1834 – Hanged at Hobart for assault and robbery of Charles Paster and William Owen
- Henry Rutland – 26 March 1834 – Hanged at Hobart for assault and robbery of Charles Paster and William Owen
- Samuel, a native of Mozambique (a 'man of colour') – 26 March 1834 – Hanged at Hobart for wounding with intent Richard Newman, Chief Constable at Port Arthur.
- Joseph Greenwood – 16 April 1834 – Hanged at Hobart for wounding with intent Constable Thomas Terry
- Benjamin Davidson – 16 June 1834 – Hanged at Hobart for the murder of Hannah Howell
- William Harlock – 16 June 1834 – Hanged at Hobart for aiding and abetting the murder of Hannah Howell
- Henry Street – 16 June 1834 – Hanged at Hobart for aiding and abetting the murder of Hannah Howell
- Henry Boucher – 24 October 1834 – Hanged at Hobart for stealing in the dwelling.
- Hugh Graham – 24 October 1834 – Hanged at Hobart for stealing in the dwelling.

=== 1835 to 1839 ===
- John Ashton – 13 February 1835 – Hanged at Hobart for burglary of the dwelling of James Hamilton
- John Burke – 13 February 1835 – Hanged at Hobart for burglary of the dwelling of James Hamilton
- Thomas Kirkham – 13 February 1835 – Hanged at Hobart for burglary of the dwelling of James Hamilton
- William Weston – 13 February 1835 – Hanged at Hobart for burglary of the dwelling of James Hamilton
- William Cole – 6 July 1835 – Hanged at Hobart for the murder of William Lowe at Tea Tree Brush
- John Dunn – 11 August 1835 – Hanged at Hobart for armed robbery of William Evans.
- George Clarke – 11 August 1835 – Hanged at Hobart for armed robbery of William Evans.
- John Burnett/Bennett – 2 November 1835 – Hanged at Hobart for murder of James Stevens/Stephens.
- Thomas Bell – 17 November 1835 – Hanged at Hobart for attempted murder of overseer, John Davis, at Port Arthur.
- Robert Melson/Melrose Ayton - 26 November 1835 - Hanged at Launceston for the rape of a child.
- John Dunn - 26 November 1835 - Hanged at Launceston break & enter the dwelling of William Mitchell .
- Richard Kitto - 26 November 1835 - Hanged at Launceston for the murder of his wife Frances Kitto nee Robinson/Robertson .
- William Riley – 11 January 1836 – Hanged at Hobart for the murder of Joseph Shuttleworth at Port Arthur .
- Samuel Hibbell – 12 February 1836 – Hanged at Hobart for the murder of Capt. Sibson Bragg
- Thomas Harris – 12 February 1836 – Hanged at Hobart for the murder of Capt. Sibson Bragg
- Robert Smith – 12 February 1836 – Hanged at Hobart for the murder of Capt. Sibson Bragg
- William Johnson - 18 February 1836 - Hanged at Hobart for wounding with intent Constable Miles Holmes
- Samuel Guillem/Gwillym – 16 March 1837 – Hanged at Hobart for the murder of Mary Mills at New Norfolk
- John McKay – 1 May 1837 – Hanged at Hobart for the murder of Joseph Edward Wilson near Perth. His corpse was later gibbeted at Perth.
- William Cook – 19 May 1837 – Hanged at Hobart for rape of Marianne Lewis, 5 years age .
- John Gardiner – 10 November 1837 – Hanged at Launceston Gaol for the murder of George Mogg on the Tamar
- James Hawes – 10 November 1837 - Hanged at Launceston for burglary and assault on Valentine Soper
- John Hudson – 10 November 1837 – Hanged at Launceston for wounding with intent overseer Isaac Schofield,
- Henry Stewart – 10 November 1837 - Hanged at Launceston for burglary and assault on Valentine Soper
- James Atterall – 21 June 1838 – Hanged at Hobart for accessory before the fact - murder of Robert Morley
- Anthony Banks – 21 June 1838 – Hanged at Hobart for burglary of the dwelling of John Vincent. Banks was the first native-born Vandemonian executed in the colony
- James Regan – 21 June 1838 – Hanged at Hobart for accessory before the fact - murder of Robert Morley

== 1840s ==
=== 1840 to 1844 ===
- William Reid - 30 January 1840 - Hanged at Launceston for rape of Sarah Brown 6 years old
- John Davis - 17 February 1840 - Hanged at Hobart for the murder of James Matthews
- Edward Martin (Wade) - 17 February 1840 - Hanged at Hobart for wounding with intent to kill Sergeant George Newman
- George Pettit - 17 February 1840 - Hanged at Hobart for the murder of John Paul
- John Riley - 17 February 1840 - Hanged at Hobart for the murder of James Matthews
- Patrick Wallace - 30 January 1841 - Hanged at Launceston for burglary in the dwelling of John Holding. (Wallace and Watson were hangman Solomon Blay's first executions.)
- William Watson - 30 January 1841 - Hanged at Launceston for burglary in the dwelling of John Holding
- Joseph Brown - 19 February 1841 - Hanged at Hobart for burglary in the dwelling of Joseph Bailey and Mary Tickner.
- James McKay - 6 May 1841 - Hanged at Hobart for the murder of William Trusson
- William Hill - 6 May 1841 - Hanged at Hobart for the murder of William Trusson
- Patrick Minahan/Milligan - 18 June 1841 - Hanged at Hobart for the murder of James Travis
- Edward Allen - 31 July 1841 - Hanged at Launceston for the murder of Samuel Brewell
- Thomas Dooner - 6 August 1841 - Hanged at Hobart for stealing from the person of Joseph Walker
- James Bromfield/Broomfield - 25 October 1841 - Hanged at Launceston for burglary of the dwelling of Thomas Bates
- James Williamson - 4 January 1842 - Hanged at Hobart for the murder of Thomas Lord
- George Bailey - 4 January 1842 - Hanged at Hobart for accessory to the murder of Thomas Lord
- Henry Belfield - 1 February 1842 - Hanged at Hobart for the murder of Thomas Broadman
- Thomas Turner - 2 June 1842 - Hanged at Hobart for the murder of his wife Hannah
- Elijah Ainsworth - 6 June 1842 - Hanged at Launceston for the rape of five-year-old Mary Jeffery
- William Langham - 10 August 1842 - Hanged at Hobart for the attempted murder of T.C. Brownell, the Assistant Surgeon at Port Arthur, and the stabbing of a boy named Thomas Cook
- Samuel Williams - 27 December 1842 - Hanged at Hobart for the murder of James Harkness at Port Arthur
- James Littleton - 27 December 1842 - Hanged at Hobart for the attempted murder of Henry Seton at Broadmarsh
- Henry Smith - 11 May 1843 - Hanged at Hobart for the murder of Henry Childe at Sandy Bay
- James Bowtell - 16 May 1843 - Hanged at Hobart for the armed robbery of William Marks on the highway at Dysart
- Riley Jeffs – 26 July 1843 – Publicly hanged at Launceston for the murder of District Constable William Ward at Campbell Town
- John Conway – 26 July 1843 – Publicly hanged at Launceston for the murder of District Constable William Ward at Campbell Town
- John Woolley – 2 April 1844 – Hanged at Hobart for robbery and attempting to kill Special Constable William Hobart Wells
- William Thomas – 2 April 1844 – Hanged at Hobart for robbery and attempting to kill Special Constable William Hobart Wells
- George Churchwood – 2 April 1844 – Hanged at Hobart for robbery at Thomas John Harrison's, at the Sandspit (Rheban)
- George Bristol – 2 April 1844 – Hanged at Hobart for robbery at Thomas John Harrison's, at the Sandspit (Rheban)
- John Walker – 2 April 1844 – Hanged at Hobart for robbery at Thomas John Harrison's, at the Sandspit (Rheban)
- Alexander Reid - 24 April 1844 – Hanged at Oatlands for shooting and wounding Constable Murray
- Thomas Marshall – 24 April 1844 – Hanged At Oatlands for the murder of Ben Smith
- George Jones – 30 April 1844 – Hanged at Hobart for shooting at William Jackson with intent to kill.
- James Platt – 30 April 1844 – Hanged at Hobart for shooting at Benjamin Cutler with intent to kill.
- Isaac Tidburrow - 2 July 1844 - Hanged at Hobart for the rape of seven-year-old Mary-Ann Gangell
- Thomas Whitsett - 2 July 1844 - Hanged at Hobart for the murder of John Hare at Port Arthur
- James Gannon - 7 August 1844 - Hanged at Hobart for the rape of Catherine Murphy, at Hollow Tree (Cambridge)
- Thomas Smith - 7 August 1844 - Hanged at Hobart for the attempted murder of William Perry at Port Arthur
- James Boyle - 7 August 1844 - Hanged at Hobart for the attempted murder of William Perry at Port Arthur
- John Childs - 31 December 1844 - Hanged at Hobart for the attempted murder of Timothy Troy at Prosser's Plains (Buckland)
- Hugh McClean - 31 December 1844 - Hanged at Hobart for cutting and wounding Clement Doughty Young with intent to murder.

=== 1845 to 1849 ===
- Peter Mullaly - 4 Feb 1845 - Hanged at Launceston for the murder of Joseph Turner.
- Richard Jackson - 1 May 1845 - Hanged at Oatlands for the rape of Elizabeth Davis
- Joseph Gardener - 24 June 1845 – Hanged at Hobart for the willful murder at Port Arthur of John Mead (Court Record) or William Mead (Convict Record)
- Anthony Kedge - 8 August 1845 - Hanged at Launceston for the murder of Charles Shepherd at George Town
- Francis Maxfield - 9 August 1845 - Hanged at Hobart for the attempted murder of Joseph Ellis at Port Arthur
- Thomas Gomm – 16 September 1845 – Hanged at Hobart for his part in the murder of Jane Saunders at New Norfolk
- William Taylor - 16 September 1845 – Hanged at Hobart for his part in the murder of Jane Saunders at New Norfolk
- Isaac Lockwood – 16 September 1845 – Hanged at Hobart for his part in the murder of Jane Saunders at New Norfolk
- Eliza Benwell – 30 September 1845 – Hanged at Hobart for aiding and abetting the murder of Jane Saunders at New Norfolk
- Thomas Gillan - 1 November 1845 - Hanged at Launceston for armed robbery at Breadalbane
- Michael Keegan - 31 December 1845 - Hanged at Hobart for attempted murder of Joseph Ellis at Port Arthur
- Job Harris - 31 December 1845 - Hanged at Hobart for sodomy of David Boyd at the Coal Mines, Port Arthur
- William Collier - 31 December 1845 - Hanged at Hobart aiding and abetting the sodomy of David Boyd at the Coal Mines, Port Arthur
- John Phillips – 4 February 1846 – Hanged at Oatlands for setting fire to the magistrate's oatstacks following a conviction for sly grog selling
- William Davis - 20 February 1846 – Hanged at Hobart for the assault and highway robbery of Thomas Miller, near the Jerusalem Probation Station (Colebrook)
- Daniel McCabe - 24 March 1846 - Hanged at Hobart for cutting and wounding, with intent to kill, Francis Scott at Impression Bay
- Charles Woodman - 24 March 1846 - Hanged at Hobart for assault and attempted murder of Elizabeth Jones, at Dobson's house, in Davey Street
- Henry Food - 28 April 1846 - Hanged at Launceston for the armed robbery of Revd Dr Browne
- Henry Cooper - 12 May 1846 - Hanged at Hobart for inflicting grievous bodily harm with an axe upon overseer Richard Beech at Impression Bay
- Michael Roach - 24 September 1846 - Hanged at Hobart for highway robbery with violence of catechist Roger Boyle at Port Arthur
- Michael Lyons - 11 November 1846 - Hanged at Hobart for committing an 'unnatural crime' with a goat at Huon Island, Port Cygnet.
- Peter Kenny - 23 March 1847 - Hanged at Hobart for the attempted murder of James Goodall Francis at Battery Point. Kenny, a former Point Puer boy, attacked Francis with a tomahawk while attempting burglary. Francis went on to become Premier of Victoria twenty-five years later
- William Bennett - 23 March 1847 - Hanged at Hobart for the murder of fellow-prisoner Thomas Shard at Port Arthur
- George Wood - 22 June 1847 - Hanged at Hobart for the murder of William Taylor at Port Arthur
- Charles Benwell (AKA William Powell) – 14 September 1847 – Hanged at Hobart for murder of George Lowe near Green Ponds (Kempton). He was the brother of Eliza Benwell, hanged in 1845. Hanged at Hobart
- Laban Gower - 23 November 1847 - Hanged at Hobart for the attempted murder of Ann Mayfield at Old Beach
- Hugh Glacken – 25 November 1847 – Hanged at Launceston for assault and robbery of Charles Crabtree
- James Hill - 4 January 1848 - Hanged at Hobart for the murder of an elderly lady named Alice Martin at Brighton
- Michael Whelan - 4 January 1848 - Hanged at Hobart for the murder of Robert Mann at Berriedale
- James Kennedy - 4 January 1848 - Hanged at Hobart for the attempted murder of William Miller at Port Arthur
- Denis Dwyer - 8 February 1848 - Hanged at Launceston for shooting with intent at John Turner
- John Hogan - 8 February 1848 - Hanged at Launceston for shooting with intent at John Turner
- James Connell - 28 February 1848 - Publicly hanged at Hobart for arson (setting a barn on fire) at Impression Bay.
- Nathan Westerman - 4 April 1848 - Hanged at Hobart for the murder of fellow-prisoner Joseph Blundell at Port Arthur
- James Sullivan – 9 May 1848 – Hanged at Oatlands for the attempted murder of Constable James Kelly at Swanston, near Andover
- Patrick Shea – 9 May 1848 – Hanged at Oatlands for the attempted murder of Constable James Kelly at Swanston
- James McGough – 9 May 1848 – Hanged at Oatlands for the attempted murder of Constable James Kelly at Swanston
- John Shale – 9 May 1848 - Hanged at Oatlands for wounding John Connell with intent to murder
- Thomas Smith – 4 August 1848 – Hanged at Oatlands for stabbing with intent to murder Constable Clough at Jericho
- Jeremiah Maher – 4 August 1848 – Hanged at Oatlands for stabbing with intent to murder Constable Clough at Jericho
- Thomas Linen – 8 August 1848 - Hanged at Hobart for the stabbing murder of Hugh Gilmore in Kelly St
- John Jordan – 7 November 1848 – Hanged at Launceston for the murder of Zimran Youram at Norfolk Plains (Longford)
- Matthew Mahide – 7 November 1848 – Hanged at Launceston for armed robbery at Snake Banks (Powranna)
- Michael Rogers- 3 January 1849 - Hanged at Hobart for the murder of Constable Joseph Howard at Port Sorell
- William Stamford - 3 January 1849 - Hanged at Hobart for the armed robbery of Thomas Lovell at Brushy Plains (Runnymede)
- John Russell Dicker - 20 March 1849 - Hanged at Hobart for attempted murder of Constable Samuel Withers on the corner of Fitzroy Crescent and Antill St, South Hobart
- James Holloway - 26 June 1849 - Hanged at Hobart for unlawfully and maliciously shooting at Edwin Beckett at Prosser's Plains (Buckland)
- John Stevens – 24 July 1849 – Hanged at Launceston for the murder of Margaret Buttery at Longford
- James McKechnie - 31 December 1849 - Hanged at Hobart for the murder of Francis Sockett in Davey St, Hobart

== 1850s ==
=== 1850 to 1854 ===
- John King - 21 March 1850 - Hanged at Hobart for cutting and wounding with intent to cause grievous bodily harm upon overseer Alexander Smith at Port Arthur
- James Howarth - 21 March 1850 - Hanged at Hobart for the assaulting and striking, with an offensive weapon, and stealing from the person, of Joshua Jennings at New Town
- James Mullay - 26 July 1850 - Hanged at Launceston for the murder of fellow-constable John McNamara at Perth
- Joseph Squires - 26 July 1850 - Hanged at Launceston sodomy of Horatio James, 4 years old
- Christopher Hollis - 24 September 1850 - Hanged at Hobart for the murder of Thomas Couchman at Bridgewater
- John Woods - 6 November 1850 - Hanged at Hobart for the murder of Constable Bernard Mulholland at Franklin
- Thomas Wilkinson - ('Black Tom') – 21 December 1850 – Hanged at Hobart for the murder of John Fawk near O'Brien's Bridge (Glenorchy)
- Joseph Brewer - 11 February 1851 - Hanged at Hobart for the murder of Ann Hefford at Campbell Town
- Thomas Burrows - 13 February 1851 - Hanged at Launceston for the armed robbery of Thomas Parsons at Nile
- William Parker - 13 February 1851 - Hanged at Launceston for the armed robbery of Thomas Parsons at Nile
- Henry Hart - 13 February 1851 - Hanged at Launceston for the attempted murder of Harriet Grubb at Cressy
- Thomas Dalton - 21 March 1851 - Hanged at Hobart for highway robbery of William Corrigan at Constitution Hill
- Henry William Stephens - 25 April 1851 - Convict. Hanged at Oatlands for Assaulting James Moore, being armed with a gun on the high road between Antill Ponds and Tunbridge
- Buchanan Wilson - 8 May 1851 - Hanged at Hobart for the armed robbery of Patrick Cooney on the Huon Road, near the Stoney-Steps
- George Mackie – 21 July 1851 – Hanged at Oatlands for the murder of Thomas Gilbert at Waters Meeting, near Cranbrook
- Thomas Cahalen - 19 September 1851 - Hanged at Hobart for the rape of Ann Curtis at Grasstree Hill, between Richmond and Risdon
- John Crisp – 27 October 1851 – Hanged at Oatlands for Wounding with Intent Constable William Donohoo at Swansea
- Francis Duke/Duigne/Duge – 31 October 1851 – A Spaniard; Hanged at Launceston for the murder of William Smith at Fern Tree Hill, near Deloraine
- James Yardley – 31 October 1851 – Hanged at Launceston for attempted murder of Robert Hudson at Deloraine
- Michael Conlan - 22 December 1851 - Hanged at Hobart for the murder of Francis Burt at Franklin
- Patrick Callahan - 22 December 1851 - Hanged at Hobart for the murder of Francis Burt at Franklin
- William Porter - 29 December 1851 - Hanged at Hobart for the felonious assault, and robbery upon the highway, of William Andrews near St. George's Alms Houses (Battery Point)
- Charles Lockwood - 28 January 1852 - Hanged at Launceston for the attempted murder of William Gaffney at Longford
- Fisher, John -16 March 1852 – Hanged at Hobart for feloniously assaulting and robbing William Lafayette Rowley on Bathurst St.
- Samuel Haines - 30 April 1852 - Hanged at Launceston for the rape of Helen McNamara
- William Gout - 30 April 1852 - Hanged at Launceston for the attempted murder by stabbing of Robert Roebuck.
- John Castle - 22 June 1852 - Hanged at Hobart for the murder of William Hibbert at Kangaroo Point
- Mary Sullivan - 5 August 1852 - Hanged at Hobart for the murder of two-year-old Clara Adeline Blackburn Fraser in Campbell St. Sullivan was seventeen when she went to the gallows.
- John Warburton - 14 September 1852 - Hanged at Hobart for the rape of 12-year-old Sarah Ann Palmer, at North-West Bay
- Patrick McMahon – 28 October 1852 – Hanged at Oatlands for rape of a child
- John Kilburn - 11 February 1853 - Hanged at Hobart for attempted murder of overseer Charles Weatherall at Pittwater
- John Wood - 11 February 1853 - Hanged at Hobart for the murder of Catherine Toole in Goulburn St
- James Dalton – 26 April 1853 – Hanged at Launceston for the murder of Constable Tom Buckmaster at Avoca
- Andrew Kelly – 26 April 1853 – Hanged at Launceston for the murder of Constable Tom Buckmaster at Avoca
- Samuel Jacobs - 29 April 1853 - Hanged at Launceston for sodomy of Nathaniel Poole aged 7 .
- Samuel Mabberly - 4 May 1853 - Hanged at Hobart for assaulting with violence and robbing Stephen Aldhouse in Church St
- Francis McManus - 21 June 1853 - Hanged at Hobart for the rape of Elizabeth Roscoe on Bruny Island
- Levi Allestree - 21 June 1853 - Hanged at Hobart for the rape of seven-year-old Jane Hughes at Bridgewater
- John Drake - 16 September 1853 - Hanged at Hobart for the murder of Richard Hyder on the Kangaroo Point Rd. (between Bellerive and Richmond)
- George Bardsley - 16 September 1853 - Hanged at Hobart for attempted murder of William Etherington, at the Saltwater River Station
- William Brown (alias Stockton) – 25 October 1853 – Hanged at Launceston for stabbing with intent to murder James Stephens
- Ezra Cox - 27 June 1854 - Hanged at Hobart for the murder of Isaac Moles at New Norfolk
- Edward Shaw - 27 June 1854 - Hanged at Hobart for the wilful murder of William ('Blind Billy') Hafner
- Thomas Kenney – 31 July 1854 – Hanged at Launceston for setting fire to a haystack at Kings Meadows
- Thomas Hall - 31 July 1854 - Hanged at Launceston for the attempted murder of his wife Jane Hall at Table Cape
- George Willey/Whiley – 3 November 1854 – Hanged at Launceston for the robbery and assault of James Smith near Westbury
- Joseph Spears – 7 November 1854 – Hanged at Hobart for the attempted murder of Constable William Crawford at O'Brien's Bridge (Glenorchy).
- John Connell - 7 November 1854 – Hanged at Hobart for the murder of Abraham Woodfield at New Town.

=== 1855 to 1859 ===
- Charles Marshall – 21 June 1855 – Hanged at Hobart for the wilful murder of George New at Bagdad
- Peter Connolly – 26 June 1855 – Hanged at Hobart for assault and robbery of William Kearney
- John "Rocky" Whelan – 26 June 1855 – Hanged at Hobart. Confessed to five murders
- Edward Heylin – 26 June 1855 – Hanged at Hobart for shooting with intent at Constable Robert Allison in Victoria St, Hobart
- John Parsons Knights – 26 June 1855 – Hanged at Hobart for burglary of the house of Thomas Nicholson in Victoria St, Hobart
- John Mellor - 19 February 1856 - Hanged at Hobart for shooting with intent at Thomas Hume Simpson at Antill Ponds
- Thomas Rushton - 19 Feb1856 - Hanged at Hobart for shooting with intent at Thomas Hume Simpson at Antill Ponds
- Richard Rowley - 25 June 1856 - Hanged at Hobart for the rape of nine-year-old Isabella Johnson in Brisbane St
- Michael Casey – 5 August 1856 – Hanged at Oatlands for the attempted murder of John Hewitt at Falmouth
- George Langridge - 19 September 1856 - Hanged at Hobart for the murder of his wife Jane Langridge at Richmond
- John O'Neill - 19 September 1856 - Hanged at Hobart for assault and robbery of James Rowland at Constitution Dock
- Anthony Clarke - 12 November 1856 - Hanged at Launceston for murder of John Kendall near Deloraine
- Michael Barry (alias Barns) - 25 November 1856 - Hanged at Hobart for the assault and robbery of Edward Adams at Old Beach
- William Woolford - 25 November 1856 - Hanged at Hobart for the attempted murder of Constable William Burton at Port Arthur
- George Nixon – 3 March 1857 - Hanged at Hobart for the murder of fourteen-year-old Henry Chamberlain at Kingston
- John Higgins - 12 August 1857 - Hanged at Launceston for the armed robbery of Henry Dales on the Evandale Road near Clairville
- James Waldron - 12 August 1857 - Hanged at Launceston for the armed robbery of Henry Dales on the Evandale Road near Clairville
- Alexander Cullen – 18 August 1857 – Hanged at Hobart for the murder of Elizabeth Ross in a house behind the Red Lion, Liverpool St
- Abraham Munday – 27 October 1857 – Hanged at Oatlands for attempted murder by poison of George White at Courland Bay
- Richard "Long Mick" Ennis – 27 October 1857 – Hanged at Oatlands for the murder of George Sturgeon at Kitty's Corner, near Antill Ponds
- James Kelly – 28 November 1857 – Hanged at Hobart for the murder of Coleman O'Loughlin at Avoca
- Timothy Kelly - 28 November 1857 - Hanged at Hobart for the murder of Coleman O'Loughlin at Avoca
- William Maher – 28 November 1857 – Hanged at Hobart for the murder of his wife Catherine Maher at Brown's River, Kingborough
- Thomas Callinan - 20 April 1858 - Hanged at Hobart for the murder of Amelia Murray at Three Hut Point
- Henry Madigan – 5 May 1858 – Hanged at Launceston for the murder of his brother John Madigan at Prosser's Forest, Ravenswood
- Matthew Burns (Breen) – 5 August 1858 – Hanged at Launceston for the rape of three-year-old Eliza MacDonald at Avoca
- George Young – 5 August 1858 – Hanged at Launceston for the murder of Esther Scott in High Street Windmill Hill
- Thomas Gault – 21 December 1858 – Hanged at Hobart for Felonious Assault and Robbery of John Duffy, Isabella Brown and Archibald Stacey at the Mount Nelson Signal Station
- William Anderson - 31 January 1859 - Hanged at Launceston for the armed robbery of James Chapman at Distillery Creek
- John McLaughlin - 31 January 1859 - Hanged at Launceston for the armed robbery of George Cooper on Westbury Road
- William Gibson - 31 January 1859 - Hanged at Launceston for sodomy of Tom Gilligan, aged 10 years.
- John King – 16 February 1859 – Hanged at Hobart for the murder of Rebecca Hall at the Bull's Head, Goulburn Street
- Peter Haley ("Black Peter") – 16 February 1859 – Hanged at Hobart for Shooting with Intent at Richard Propsting on the road between Ross and Tunbridge
- Daniel ("Wingy") Stewart – 16 February 1859 – Hanged at Hobart for Shooting with Intent at Richard Propsting on the road between Ross and Tunbridge
- William Ferns (alias Flowers) – 16 February 1859 – Hanged at Hobart for Shooting with Intent at Richard Propsting on the road between Ross and Tunbridge.
- William Davis – 16 February 1859 – Hanged at Hobart for the murder of Andre Cassavant at Black River
- Robert Brown – 4 May 1859 – Hanged at Hobart for the rape of a three-year-old at Triabunna
- David Robinson – 17 May 1859 – Hanged at Launceston for the stabbing murder of John Ritchie at Westbury.
- Bernard Donahue – 12 July 1859 – Hanged at Hobart for the murder of James Burton near Kingston
- Henry Ryan - 2 August 1859 - hanged at Launceston for the assault and robbery of John Brydie.

== 1860s ==
- John Vigors – 31 January 1860 – Hanged at Oatlands for Shooting with Intent at John Baker at Ellerslie
- Henry Baker - 7 February 1860 - Hanged at Launceston for the murder of Ellen Gibson at Sandhill
- John Nash – 4 May 1860 – Hanged at Hobart for the murder of William Iles near Cleveland
- Julius Baker – 10 May 1860 – Hanged at Hobart for shooting with intent at Port Arthur. Baker was a constable who took money from two prisoners Stretton and Donohue to assist their escape, he then shot them in their attempt
- Michael Walsh - 29 May 1860 - Hanged at Launceston for the assault and rape of Eleanor Ward at Longford
- Martin Lydon – 25 September 1860 – Hanged at Hobart for sodomy of Hannah Norah Handley aged 9 years
- Thomas Ross - 30 January 1861 - Hanged at Launceston for sodomy of a child named William Saunders
- John Hailey – 23 May 1861 – Hanged at Launceston (horribly botched) for the murder of William Wilson at Cullenswood.
- John Chapman – 23 May 1861 – Hanged at Launceston for assault with intent to murder Daniel Webb at Avoca
- Patrick Maloney – 23 May 1861 – Hanged at Launceston for the murder of Richard Furlong at Evandale
- Margaret Coghlan – 18 February 1862 – Hanged at Hobart for the murder of her husband John Coghlan in Goulburn St, Hobart, near the corner of Harrington St
- Charles Flanders - 24 June 1862 – Hanged at Hobart for the murder of ten-year-old Mary Ann Riley at Bagdad
- William Mulligan – 18 November 1862 – Hanged at Hobart for the rape and robbery of Johanna Harrbach at Bagdad
- Hendrick Whitnalder – 20 February 1863 – Hanged at Hobart for sodomy of Cornwall Collins age 14 years. (Collard)
- Dennis Collins - 11 August 1863 - Hanged at Launceston for sodomy of Joseph Palmer aged 7 years .
- Robert McKavor/Mcivor – 16 February 1864 – Hanged at Hobart for armed robbery and wounding of Edward Coningsby
- James Lynch – 23 May 1865 – Hanged at Launceston for the rape of his ten-year-old step-daughter Cathy Nichols at Port Sorell
- William Griffiths – 2 December 1865 – Hanged at Hobart for the murder of eight-year-old George and six-year-old Sarah Johnson at Glenorchy
- Daniel Connors – 17 March 1868 – Hanged at Launceston for the murder of Ellen Moriarty at Longford
- Patrick Kiely - 17 November 1869 - Hanged at Launceston for the murder of his wife Bridget at Paddy's Scrub, Deloraine

== 1870s to 1940s ==
- John Regan (46) – 28 June 1870 – Hanged at Launceston for the murder of Emma Regan nee Lynam
- Job Smith (55) – 31 May 1875 – Hanged at Hobart for the rape of Margaret Ayres
- John Breshnahan/Brosnahan (46) - 19 November 1877 - Hanged at Launceston for the murder of Thomas Rudge
- Richard Copping (19) – 21 October 1878 – Hanged at Hobart for the murder of Susannah Stacey
- George Braxton (60) – 10 July 1882 – Hanged at Launceston for the murder of Ellen Sneezwell in York Street
- James Ogden (20) – 4 June 1883 – Hanged at Hobart for the murder of William Wilson
- James Sutherland (18) – 4 June 1883 – Hanged at Hobart for the murder of William Wilson
- Henry Stock/Stocks (22) – 13 October 1884 – Hanged at Hobart for the murder of Elizabeth Stock (nee Keats) This was hangman Solomon Blay's last execution
- Timothy Walker (76) - 10 January 1887 - Hanged at Hobart for the murder of Benjamin Hampton (or Hamilton). Walker was the last transported convict to be executed in Tasmania. While Solomon Blay was within the gaol walls at the time, he did not perform the execution
- Arthur Cooley (19) – 17 August 1891 – Hanged at Hobart for the murder of Mary Camille Ogilvy.
- Joseph Belbin (19) – 11 March 1914 – Hanged at Hobart for the murder of Margaret Ledwell.
- George Carpenter (27) – 27 December 1922 – Hanged at Hobart for the murder of Thomas Carpenter
- Frederick Thompson (32) - 14 February 1946 - Hanged at Hobart for the murder of eight year old Evelyn Maughan. The last person executed in Tasmania.
