= Actaeon (ship) =

Several ships have been named Actaeon for Actaeon, a figure from Greek mythology"

- Actaeon (1815 ship) (or Actæon, or Acteon) was launched at Fort Gloster, India, in 1815. She was wrecked without loss of life on 28 October 1822 in the D'Entrecasteaux Channel in southern Tasmania.
- Actaeon (1815 Topsham ship) was launched at Topsham, Devon. She traded widely and from 1823 she made some voyages to Bombay under a license from the British East India Company (EIC). She then traded with what is now Peru, and was probably condemned in what is now Chile in 1828.

== See also ==
- HMS Actaeon – any one of 10 vessels or shore establishments of the British Royal Navy
