= HM Colonial Brig Prince Leopold (1818) =

History

United Kingdom
- Name: Rosetta
- Owner: Jonathan Griffiths
- Builder: Jonathan Griffiths, Richmond, Tasmania
- Fate: Sold November 1818

United Kingdom
- Name: HM Colonial Brig Prince Leopold
- Namesake: Leopold I of Belgium
- Acquired: November 1818 by purchase
- Fate: Sold July 1831

United Kingdom
- Name: Prince Leopold
- Owner: Messrs. Kelly & Lucas
- Acquired: July 1831 by purchase
- Renamed: Mary Elizabeth
- Fate: Wrecked 30 May 1835

General characteristics
- Tons burthen: 82, or 90 (bm)

HM Colonial brig Prince Leopold was launched in 1815, or earlier, as Rosetta. The government in Van Diemen's Land (VDL) purchased her in 1818 to serve the settlements. She then carried timber other supplies, and transferred both prisoners and soldiers between VDL and Port Jackson, and to and from Maria Island. In July 1831 the government sold the brig. Her new owners named her Mary Elizabeth, or Mary and Elizabeth. She was wrecked on 30 May 1835 at Port Sorell, Tasmania.

== Career ==
=== Rosetta ===
The first mention of the brig Rosetta occurred in December 1815. When convicts took over Trial on 12 September 1816, the government chartered Rosetta for £200, put a detachment of troops from the 46th Regiment on her, and sent her in pursuit. Rosetta was unsuccessful.

On 14 April 1818 Rosetta's master took a boat and acted in concert with a party of soldiers advancing overland to capture a boat that seven or 17 escaped convicts had sailed from Hobart to Port Dalrymple.

=== Prince Leopold ===
The government in Tasmania purchased Rosetta circa November 1818 to service the settlements in Van Diemen's Land, and renamed the brig Prince Leopold. The government paid £1200 15s for her.

Around midnight on 28 October 1822 Actaeon, from Mauritius and bound for Sydney struck the rocks in D'Entrecasteaux Channel and the crew abandoned ship. The officers and some of the crew took the longboat and made for Hobart, where they reported the wreck. Deveron and Prince Leopold went to salvage as much cargo as possible and pick up the remaining crew. Some 300 barrels of pork were salvaged from Actaeon's mixed cargo of wine, spirits, coal, pork, soap, and other goods. A gale totally wrecked Actaeon and three men from Prince Leopold drowned when their boat upset.

In mid-1825 Prince Leopold underwent a thorough repair.

On 27 March 1826 Prince Leopold arrived at Hobart from Launceston. She was carrying five bushrangers who had been captured: Matthew Brady, Goodwin, Patrick Bryant, Thomas Jeffrey, and John Perry. (On 4 May 1826, Brady, Bryant, Perry, and Jeffrey were hanged at the old Hobart gaol.)

On 29 June 1827 Hope, of 231 tons (bm), Cunningham, master, grounded on a beach opposite Betsey's Island as she was coming into Hobart from Sydney. The ship was wrecked. Prince Leopold and Recovery came out and were able to save about two-thirds of the cargo.

The government sold Prince Leopold for £1250 on 12 July 1831 in an auction.

=== Mary and Elizabeth ===
Prince Leopold returned to Hobart on 30 July with a full cargo of oil that she had gathered at Adventure Bay. On 4 September she brought in another cargo of oil, this time from Trumpeter Bay.

By early 1832 her owners had renamed Prince Leopold Mary Elizabeth.

On 9 July 1834 Mary and Elizabeth arrived at Hobart, in ballast. Her crew had deserted her in Cloudy Bay, New Zealand. While Mary Elizabeth, Lovatt, master, was at Cloudy Bay the local Maori took her boat, gear, dead whales, and whatever else they could.

== Fate ==
Mary and Elizabeth, of and for Hobart Town, Capt. Kelly, was wrecked at Port Sorell, on 30 May 1835. All her crew were saved. She was carrying whaling stores to Portland Bay when winds started to drive her ashore. Captain Kelly then ran her ashore to save the lives of the crew, which were saved, but with difficulty. The wreck was to be sold for the benefit of the underwriters.
