= Through line =

Connecting theme or plot in a narrative work

A through line is a connecting theme or plot used in media such as films and books. It is sometimes also called the 'spine', and was first suggested by Konstantin Stanislavski as a simplified way for actors to think about characterization. He believed actors should not only understand what their character was doing, or trying to do (their objective), in any given unit, but should also strive to understand the through line that linked these objectives together and thus pushed the character forward through the narrative.

Through line is increasingly being used in other contexts as substitutes for words like thread, as seen in the following excerpt from an article by Alex Knapp: "There is a constant through line we see starting with A New Hope and running through to the end of the Return of the Jedi of the Emperor consolidating more and more power into his own hands and that of his right-hand man, Darth Vader."
