= Actaeon (disambiguation) =

Actaeon or Acteon (Ἀκτέων) was a hero in Greek mythology.

Actaeon or Acteon may also refer to:

== Arts and entertainment ==
- Acteón (film), a 1965 Spanish film
- Actéon (opera), a 1684 French opera by Marc-Antoine Charpentier
- Actaeon, a lost play by Iophon (fl. 428–405 BC)
- Actaeon, a play by Phrynichus (tragic poet), an early Greek tragedian
- "Actaeon", a chapter of the Japanese anime Metamorphoses

== Places ==
- Acteon Group, islands between the Tuamotu and Gambier archipelagoes, French Polynesia
- Actaeon Island and Actaeon Group, Tasmania, Australia
- Actaeon Sound, British Columbia, Canada

== Military ==
- HMS Actaeon or HMS Acteon, several ships and a shore establishment of the Royal Navy
- French submarine Actéon, a French Navy submarine commissioned in 1931 and sunk in 1942

== Transportation ==
- Actaeon (1815 ship), a merchant ship wrecked in 1822, lending its name to Actaeon Island
- Actaeon (1815 Topsham ship), a merchant ship which made some of its voyages for the British East India Company
- Actaeon, a Priam-class locomotive of the Great Western Railway

== Other uses ==
- Actaeon beetle (Megasoma actaeon), a rhinoceros beetle
- Acteon (gastropod), a genus of small sea snails
- Acteon Group (company), a British subsea services company
- Actaeon, son of Melissus, another mythical person, victim of Archias of Corinth

== See also ==
- Acteonidae
