= Unit of action =

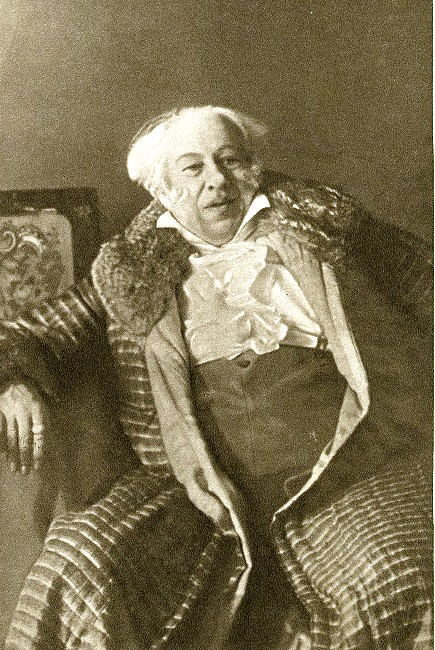
Rehearsal work on "bits" (or "units") of action to explore the dramatic possibilities of a script was propounded by Konstantin Stanislavsky (here seen in the role of the conservative patriarch Famusov in Alexander Griboyedov's satirical verse comedy Woe from Wit)

In acting, units of action, otherwise known as bits or beats, are sections that a play's action can be divided into for the purposes of dramatic exploration in rehearsal.

The concept was propounded by the Russian actor, director and educator Konstantin Stanislavsky, who initially liked to use the term kusok (Russian: кусок, IPA: [kʊˈsok]) an ordinary Russian word that can be translated as bit – as in a bit, or slice, of bread or meat. This was the term Stanislavsky preferred in the original drafts of his books. Stanislavsky also referred to these bits of action as episodes, events and facts.

The term “unit” was introduced in the standard early translations of Stanislavsky's writings. Use of beat in the place of bit has become mainstream in American method acting. This historic mistranslation may have helped spawn the common metaphor of the dramatic script as a musical score. Stanislavsky used the same metaphor to refer to detailed production plans. It was also taken up by the innovative Polish director Jerzy Grotowski as a score of physical actions.

== Bits of pieces ==
Stanislavsky conceived the segmentation of script as a preparatory tool for actors working on a play. Although he used the Russian word for "bit" (kusok) in the drafts he originally made for his planned books, he later preferred to speak in terms of "episode" (epizod in Russian), "event" (sobytie), and "fact" (fakt). These were the terms that Stanislavsky chose to use while teaching his system of acting to students at the Opera-Dramatic Studio in Moscow in the final years of his life, when he was concerned about the risk of losing sight of the play as a whole after breaking the action down into small bits. By this time, he was consistently distinguishing between more extended "episodes" (large bits or "events") and shorter "facts" (medium or small bits or "events"), using the Russian terms he had already employed in his notes and drafts earlier in his career. In Stanislavsky's conception, division into "episodes" can reveal the basic building-blocks of action, while subdivision into "facts" can help uncover the changes that occur from one moment to the next. Such divisions can be used to help players explore their characters and discover their actions through improvisation work during the early stages of rehearsal.

The frequently used term "units" derives from the somewhat less intuitive terminology introduced by Stanislavsky's original American translator, Elizabeth Hapgood (a fluent speaker of Russian who had married the diplomat Norman Hapgood). In addition to choosing more abstract terms for her translations, Hapgood was somewhat inconsistent in their use. For example, she sometimes confuses "bits" (i.e. "units") with the related "tasks" that actors must confront in their roles ("objective" is her translation of zadacha, the Russian for task).

The term "beats" is commonly used in American method acting. The transformation of "bits" into "beats" may derive from the pronunciation of émigré Russian teachers in America, possibly in conjunction with the image of a string of "beads" on a necklace. It has been suggested that oral teachings by Richard Boleslavsky of the Moscow Art Theater, who helped bring Stanislavsky's system to America, may have triggered the persistent mistranslation, and ultimately the metaphor commonly encountered in method acting of the script as a musical score. (Following the 1898 Moscow Art Theatre production of The Seagull, Stanislavsky had himself referred to the detailed production plan that can be made for a play as the directorial score, and later the metaphor was further developed by Jerzy Grotowski, who envisaged a physical score of action.) The word "beat" is sometimes also employed as a stage direction to indicate a significant pause.
