= Acción =

Acción (Spanish "action" or "share") or Accion may refer to:

- Acción Emprendedora, a non-profit organization based in Chile
- Accion International, a microfinance organization based in Boston
  - Accion USA, the US branch of Accion International
- Accion Lacus, ancient name of Lake Geneva
- Acción mutante, 1993 Spanish science fiction black comedy film
- Acción, Spanish record label of Pablo Guerrero and other artists
- Accion, a performer associated with the musical collective Swing Mob

== See also ==
- Acción Popular (disambiguation)
- Acción y reacción
- Action (disambiguation)
