= Committee for a Radical Left Rally =

Committee for a Radical Left Rally Επιτροπή για μια Ριζοσπαστική Αριστερή Συσπείρωση
- Abbreviation: ERAS
- Leader: Collective leadership
- Founded: October 2011
- Dissolved: 2014
- Headquarters: Nicosia, Cyprus
- Ideology: Communism; Euroscepticism
- Political position: Far-left

Website
- erascy.blogspot.gr (archived)

ERAS (Committee for a Radical Left Rally; Greek: Επιτροπή για μια Ριζοσπαστική Αριστερή Συσπείρωση, ΕΡΑΣ) was a far-left organisation in the Republic of Cyprus. It was founded in 2011 by communist and socialist activists in an attempt to organise the people of the radical left in Cyprus. Due to internal disagreement between its various factions ERAS was eventually dissolved in 2014, with one faction forming the bi-communal group ΔΡΑΣυ-Eyelem and participating in the Cypriot European Elections of the same year.

== Political views ==
ERAS identified itself as a communist political party. It claimed to hold a strong position in favor of the welfare state and supported the permanent nationalisation of the banking sector. It supported the reduction of Defense expenses and the duration of conscription in the National Guard. It held a strong anti-austerity position concerning the austerity measures agreed upon between the Troika and the government of Cyprus. It chose not to support any candidate in the 2013 presidential elections, stating that "within the current conditions, we should have had our own candidate in order to strongly express the ideas and strength of the radical left" but that "since ERAS is a recently founded committee, we deemed that we do not have at the moment the organisational capacity or the resources to undergo an electoral campaign". The Committee also stated that the AKEL-backed candidate, Stavros Malas, does not "guarantee in any way the defense of the interests of the people and the working class and promotes the delusion that it is possible in the conditions of this crisis to retain the social interest without opposition to the central decisions of the bourgeoisie."

ERAS has also stated support for the abolition of benefits of high-ranking state officials, the right to abortion, the decriminalisation of cannabis and the right of civil partnership recognition for homosexual couples.

== Activities ==
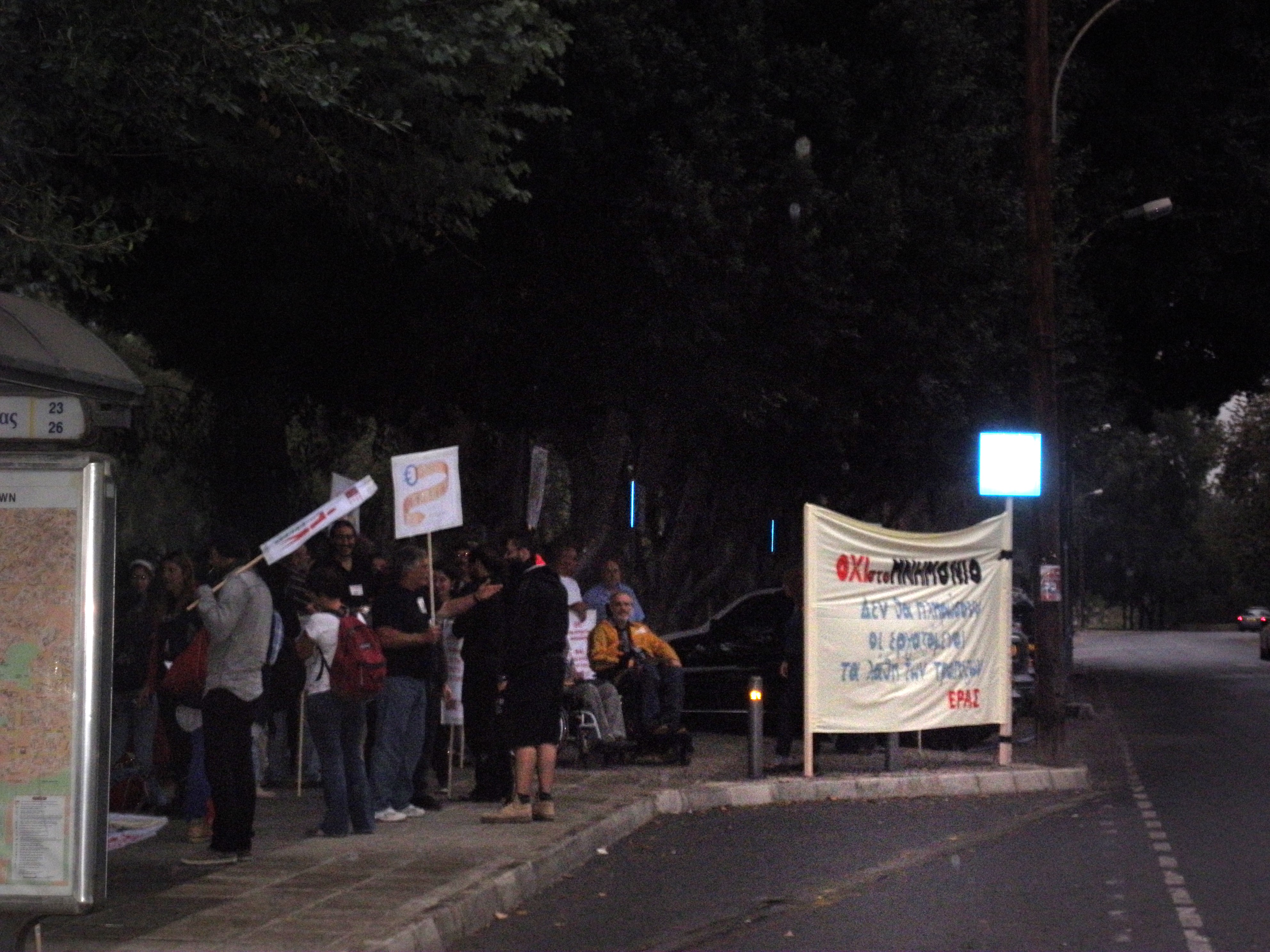
Members of ERAS and the New Internationalist Left protesting against austerity outside of the House of Representatives in Nicosia, in 2012.

On 8 November 2012, ERAS organised the first protest against austerity and the Troika negotiations that were still taking place. Protesters were gathered outside the House of Representatives holding banners and shouting slogans against austerity. Leaflets with alternative proposals for the economy were distributed in the protest, with proposals including the nationalisation of banking, the reduction of the army and the freezing of the army budget, and the increase of the corporate tax. Members of the New Internationalist Left (NEDA) also participated in the protest. On 11 January 2013, members of ERAS organised a protest outside the hotel that hosted the meeting of the European People's Party in Cyprus. The protesters shouted against neo-liberalism, capitalism and the memorandum, while some of them wore masks with the faces of various European leaders.
