= Amy Rose Spiegel =

Writer and editor

- Born: December 16, 1990 (age 35)
- Occupations: Writer, editor
- Writing career
- Language: English
- Notable works: Action: A Book about Sex; Enormous Eye
- Website: amyrosespiegel.com

Amy Rose Spiegel (born December 16, 1990) is a writer and editor. She is the author of Action: A Book About Sex (Grand Central Publishing, 2016) and No One Does It Like You: And 77 Other Illustrated Affirmations (Workman, 2019) and a senior editor at Broadly.

== Career ==
Spiegal was a story editor at Rookie, where she wrote about music, drugs, sex, and body acceptance, as well as hosted a makeup video tutorial series. She became an associate editor at BuzzFeed the day after she graduated from college in December 2012 while contributing to Rookie as a staff writer, later leaving BuzzFeed to take her editing role there. She has also been a contributor to Dazed, Rolling Stone, NME and MTV.

=== Action: A Book About Sex ===
On May 17, 2016, Spiegel published her first book Action: A Book About Sex with Hachette imprint Grand Central Publishing. Reviews note Grand Central positioned the book as self-help, though it might also be classified as memoir, with Spiegel interspersing advice with her own experiences: "Spiegel inserts her own narrative within the instruction, which makes the book less like a textbook and more like it’s a long, handwritten letter covered in cool stickers from a best friend or older sister." In Slate, Christina Cauterucci described Action as "a sex advice book for a new, progressive generation, one whose views on sex are informed by a basic ethos of fluid sexuality, body positivity, and feminist responses to rape culture." Writing in The Guardian, Laura Snapes said the book struck the tone of "a wise and experienced companion, whose belief in the reader, whom Spiegel addresses frequently, feels like a dare to trust that you could follow her confident and charming lead."

=== No One Does It Like You ===
On April 2, 2019, Workman published Spiegel's second book, No One Does It Like You: And 77 Other Illustrated Affirmations. The book collected and expanded on Spiegel's monthly illustrated advice column for Lenny Letter.

=== Enormous Eye ===
Spiegel created the website Enormous Eye. Launched on Valentine's Day 2015, the Enormous Eye is a collection of essays with contemporary writers recording their thoughts and activities over the course of one Saturday. Contributors have included Tavi Gevinson, Sarah Nicole Prickett, and Doreen St. Félix, among others.
