= Action theory =

Action theory may refer to:

- Action theory (philosophy), an area in philosophy concerned with the processes causing intentional human movement
- Action theory (sociology), a sociological theory established by the American theorist Talcott Parsons
- Social action, an approach to the study of social interaction outlined by the German sociologist Max Weber and taken further by G. H. Mead

It may also refer to a number of different types of social interactions and associations, including:

- Affectional action
- Instrumental action
- Traditional action
- Value-rational action
- Communicative action
- Dramaturgical action
- Group action (sociology)
