= Thomas Jeffrey =

Australian bushranger, cannibal, and murderer (c. 1791–1826)

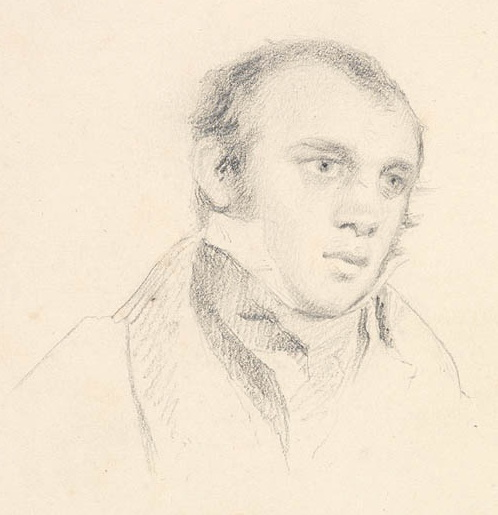
- Thomas Jeffrey, sketched by Thomas Bock in April 1826.
- Born: c. 1791; Bristol, England
- Died: 4 May 1826; Hobart, Tasmania
- Cause of death: Execution by hanging
- Conviction: Murder
- Penalty: Death

Details
- Victims: (murders committed by Jeffrey, Russell and Perry) "Sutherland's man"; Isaac Beechy; John Tibbs (infant); Constable Magnus Bakie; Edward Russell
- Country: Australia
- State: Tasmania
- Date apprehended: 22 January 1826

Thomas Jeffrey (surname also recorded as Jeffery, Jeffries, Jeffreys or Jefferies; c. 1791 – 4 May 1826) was a convict bushranger, murderer, and cannibal in the mid-1820s in Van Diemen's Land (now Tasmania, Australia). In contemporary newspaper reports of his crimes, he was frequently described as a 'monster'. Jeffrey and three other convicts absconded from custody in Launceston in December 1825 and were subsequently responsible for five murders characterised by extreme violence, including the killing of a five-month-old infant. Another victim was a member of the gang, killed while he slept and his flesh consumed by his companions. Jeffrey was captured in January 1826; he was tried in Hobart and convicted of various of his crimes. Jeffrey was executed by hanging at Hobart in May 1826.

== Biography ==
=== Background ===
Thomas Jeffrey was born in about 1791 in Bristol, England, the son of a butcher. He received seven years of schooling, after which he served aboard the British naval warship Achille. After four years and seven months, he deserted from the Navy, claiming "cruel usage". Jeffrey then went to London where he enlisted in the Army as a drummer. After two years and nine months, he deserted again and returned to sea on the frigate Leander.

In 1814, Jeffrey returned to Bristol where he began to exhibit sociopathic behaviour, stealing from his father and other relatives before returning to London. There, he stole from an uncle and Captain Dower, a relative of his mother's, before leaving London and moving from one place to another. He joined three men armed with pistols and began robbing farmers as they returned from market. On one occasion, between Lincoln and Gainsborough in the East Midlands, they accosted an old farmer who refused to hand over his money. One of Jeffrey's accomplices shot him dead and they left his body in a ditch, stealing £69 from their victim. The four men drank and gambled until they were apprehended near Hull on suspicion of murdering the farmer. They were detained in gaol for six months and finally released due to a lack of evidence.

After his release, Jeffrey returned to his home town where his sister gave him £5 on the condition he leave Bristol. He returned to the East Midlands where he and three accomplices broke into and stole from a house in Nottingham. One of the men was apprehended a few days later, giving information against the others that led to their arrest at nearby Leicester. At the time of his arrest in 1817, Jeffrey's occupation was recorded as painter and glazier. Jeffrey was convicted in the Nottingham Assizes on 29 July 1817, receiving a sentence of transportation for life.

=== Transportation ===
After a period in gaol, Jeffrey was transferred to the prison hulk Retribution, moored at Woolwich on the River Thames. In September 1819, he was transported to the colony of New South Wales aboard the Prince Regent with 161 other convicts. In consideration of his previous experience at sea, during the voyage Jeffrey had his irons removed so he could work as a seaman. The Prince Regent arrived at Port Jackson in Sydney on 27 January 1820.

Jeffrey was initially assigned to a settler named Brown on the Hawkesbury River. Later, he was assigned to work on the crew of a boat based at Cockle Bay on Port Jackson. One night, he was apprehended by the police for stealing oranges from an orchard on Parramatta River, for which he was sentenced to 100 lashes and two years in the Newcastle coalmines. Jeffrey and six others subsequently absconded from a convict work-gang at Limeburners Creek near the Karuah River north of Newcastle and made their way south to the Sydney region. During their journey through the bush, two of the escaped convicts were murdered and eaten by the others. The five remaining absconders were apprehended when they reached Parramatta.

Jeffrey was sent "over the Blue Mountains" but absconded after only three weeks with three other prisoners. They made their way to Emu Plains, where they survived by opportunistic stealing. After his companions gave themselves up, Jeffrey joined with a large group of escaped convicts in The Cowpastures district but was betrayed, apprehended, and taken to Parramatta Gaol where he was put in irons. Eventually, Jeffrey was taken before the magistrate John Macarthur to whom he provided information that led to the apprehension of his erstwhile companions (who were later sent to the Port Macquarie penal settlement). Macarthur decided to send Jeffrey, the intractable absconder, to Van Diemen's Land.

=== Van Diemen's Land ===
Jeffrey was transported to Van Diemen's Land aboard the brig Hawies, arriving on 1 January 1822 at Port Dalrymple at the mouth of the Tamar River. By August 1822, Jeffrey had been assigned as an overseer of a work-gang at the George Town gaol.

On the evening of 13 June 1824, Chief Constable George Lawson visited the George Town watch-house and found one of the prisoners absent. He went to the nearby Ship Inn where he found the prisoner, Joseph Smith, and returned him to the watch-house. When he returned, Lawson was informed by the watch-house keeper that Jeffrey, "a Prisoner and overseer of the Gaol Gang", had been trying to break through the wall with a pick-axe. Lawson went inside and ordered Jeffrey to a cell. Jeffrey was abusive, appeared to be intoxicated, and refused to obey. Lawson then left to seek assistance. He returned with three constables and ordered them to put Jeffrey in irons. The convict overseer then drew a knife, made several thrusts at Lawson and told them "he would stab the first man that should attempt to put him in irons". Lawson succeeded in knocking the knife from Jeffrey's grasp, and he was restrained and placed in a cell. Jeffrey was later transferred to the George Town Gaol and sentenced to twelve months in the Macquarie Harbour Penal Station for "threats to stab Chief Constable Lawson".

However, Jeffrey was never transferred to Macquarie Harbour; instead, he was put to work in a "Public Works" gang at George Town. On 1 February 1825, he absconded from the work-gang. Jeffrey's details were published in the Hobart Town Gazette, alongside a long list of other runaway convicts. The description given of Jeffrey was of a 35-year-old, standing 5 feet 9 1/4 inches (176 cm) tall, having brown hair and brown eyes, with tattoos of a "castle, hearts, and darts, flower pots, and several other marks" on his left arm. In common with others on the list, a reward of two pounds was offered for his apprehension. It is likely that Jeffrey was recaptured soon afterwards, with his conduct record noting that he received a punishment of fifty lashes and hard labour in the gaol work-gang.

=== Transfer to Launceston ===
By April 1825, Jeffrey was transferred further up the Tamar Valley to Launceston, where he was assigned as flagellator at the Launceston Gaol. Jeffrey very soon became known as a vicious flogger of men who "appeared to delight in the torture which he inflicted". In April 1825, it was reported that the Commandant of Launceston Gaol "thinks that by a very severe mode of flogging, he will repress all disorders". To this end, he had engaged "a very strong man" as flagellator. The correspondent claimed to have personally witnessed two men recently flogged, "who were cut round into the throat, under the armpits, and on the belly and ribs of the right side". Most, it was claimed, were being punished for "trifling crimes, such as being too late for muster, or absent from work". The writer added: "I am afraid this mode will drive many into the bush; for I have heard some declare that sooner than receive one hundred lashes they would do something to get hanged!".

Jeffrey's conduct record states that he was reprimanded on 24 May 1825 for "neglect of duty". On 3 August, he was fined ten shillings for being drunk and disorderly. By this stage, Jeffrey was referred to as the watch-house keeper as well as flagellator. In the confession made prior to his execution, Jeffrey laments the responsibilities given to him after his relocation to Launceston "where drink was the total ruin of me[;] I was made watch house keeper[,] a situation unfit for a drunkard".

On 25 August, Jeffrey was fined half his salary for "falsely imprisoning & assaulting" Mrs. Elizabeth Jessop, a free woman. The incident, which began on the evening of 20 August, was the subject of differing accounts by Jessop herself and another woman, Mrs. Ann Sharman. Common to both accounts is that Mrs. Sharman had been confined to the watch-house and Mrs. Jessop visited her there, bringing bedding and food. Sharman described Jessop as being "very tipsey" and abusive towards Jeffrey, the watch-house keeper. Jeffrey then confined Mrs. Jessop to the same cell as Mrs. Sharman, for the reason of her "using ill language towards him". Later in the night Jeffrey entered the cell in an undressed state and attempted sexual contact with Mrs. Jessop, though by both women's accounts he was rebuffed. He allowed Jessop to leave the following morning.

On 20 October 1825, Jeffrey was fined 20 shillings from his salary for having taken "a female prisoner out of the watch house". A correspondent to the Colonial Times later observed: "The treatment of many women who had been placed under his charge in the watch-house, is monstrous beyond description". In the same article it was asserted that Jeffrey had boasted "of the favour he received" from Peter Mulgrave, the Launceston Police Magistrate, claiming the magistrate "would never believe any thing against him".

=== Escape to the bush ===
On the night of Sunday 11 December 1825, Jeffrey absconded from lawful custody into the bush in company with three other convicts: John Perry, James Hopkins, and Edward Russell. Jeffrey's companions were said to have been amongst those in custody, and "it was agreed amongst them, that they should all take to the woods". The specific reason for Jeffrey giving up the position of watch-house keeper is not known, but on the night it occurred, the escape was expected by the police. The Police Magistrate Mulgrave and a number of constables had "placed themselves in ambuscade to detect them in the act of breaking out". There may have been a degree of fatalism in Jeffrey's decision to abscond; on that night (as he later stated), he "was resolved for nothing but immediate death". Jeffrey had locked the other prisoners in their cells and, as he and his companions left the watch-house at about midnight to begin their escape, they "saw three men standing waiting". They drew back, intending to check the rear of the building, but suddenly a pistol shot rang out and the four convicts decided to run, jumping the lumberyard fence and escaping to "the long black hills". Jeffrey had departed with a pistol, though in their hasty departure, he had left behind a knapsack he had packed.

Each of Jeffrey's three companions had also been sentenced to transportation for life:

- John Perry was about 22 years of age and a native of Battersea, standing 5 feet 5 1/2 inches (166 cm) tall, with brown hair and dark grey eyes; he was employed as a bricklayer's labourer and was tried for "felony" in county Surrey in December 1822, sentenced to life; arrived in Van Diemen's Land aboard the Commodore Hayes in August 1823; he had previously absconded from a "Public Works" gang at George Town on 4 February 1825; he "violently assaulted" Thomas Banks in July 1825 and was ordered to work in the Gaol work-gang for two months; on 20 November 1825 he absconded from George Town for which he received 50 lashes and was to be removed to Maria Island (not carried out due to him absconding from the Launceston watch-house).
- James Hopkins was about 20 years of age and a native of Chosedale, county Gloucestershire, standing 5 feet 2 1/2 inches (159 cm) tall, with brown hair and grey eyes; he worked as a stocking weaver and was tried for burglary at the Gloucester Assizes in April 1821, sentenced to life; arrived in Van Diemen's Land aboard the Claudine in December 1821; previously absconded from a "Public Works" gang at Launceston in March 1825.
- Edward Russell was tried for burglary in county Surrey and sentenced to transportation for life; he was a recent arrival in the colony, arriving in Van Diemen's Land aboard the Medina in September 1825.

In need of supplies, the four absconders stopped at the hut of a man named Smith at The Springs, 8 miles (13 km) south of Launceston. Jeffrey bailed up two men in the hut and took a musket, gunpowder, some flour, and a knapsack. Two days later, the escaped convicts arrived at a farm belonging to Captain Andrew Barclay on the South Esk River near Perth (13 miles south of Launceston). At a hut on the farm, they took a "fowling piece" (shotgun) and provisions, forcing the two occupants to walk with them into the bush before releasing them. On 14 December, "Jeffries, the flogger, and his gang" robbed a stock-hut near land on the South Esk River belonging to Rowland Loane. As they left, "they stated their intention of joining Brady and his gang". Matthew Brady and his gang of bushrangers were at the time notorious in Van Diemen's Land, having been at large and active throughout the island for eighteen months after escaping from the penal station at Macquarie Harbour in a whaleboat.

It is possible that Jeffrey and his companions made contact with Brady's gang of bushrangers soon afterwards but their offer to join with Brady's gang was refused. Later on, in early January 1826, Brady's group robbed a settler named Haywood in the vicinity of Hobart. During the robbery, the bushrangers informed Haywood that Jeffrey "had tendered them his services, and had been rejected".

At about this time, the fugitives stole a musket, 30 pounds (14 kg) of mutton, and 6 pounds (2.7 kg) of salt from the dwelling of Joseph Railton at Spring Plains in the Evandale area (a crime for which Jeffrey, Perry, and Hopkins were later convicted). After the raid on Railton's place, James Hopkins separated from his companions. Later Jeffrey, Perry, and Russell approached "Bateman's hut" (possibly John Batman's hut on the South Esk River). As Jeffrey neared the door of the dwelling, two men appeared holding muskets but dropped them at the bushranger's command. Another two men were found inside, one of them injured in bed. After gathering supplies from the hut, they forced the three men able to walk to carry the goods 9 miles (14 km) to the foot of the surrounding mountains where they were given their freedom.

=== Murder on Sutherland's run ===
On about 16 December, the four bushrangers arrived on James Sutherland's 'Rothbury' run, described as a "grazing farm", on the Isis River between Cressy and Campbell Town. They evidently felt secure as they rested there for about ten days, feasting on slaughtered stock from the run. On Christmas Day, they looted an unoccupied tent hut on the property and drank a bottle of rum they found inside. As the bushrangers were walking away, suddenly a shot was fired ahead of them. As they moved cautiously forward, two men armed with muskets were sighted. Jeffrey told them to drop their arms, to which they responded by demanding their identities. When Jeffrey said who he was, one of the men ran off and Jeffrey and the remaining man exchanged shots, resulting in the man receiving a thigh wound. As Jeffrey and his companions approached the wounded man, who appeared to be drunk, he began to abuse them. According to Jeffrey's later accounts, as they drew nearer Russell came up behind and shot the wounded man in the head, killing him. The murdered man was never identified in newspaper reports, described only as "Mr. Sutherland's man".

The murder and its implications imbued the bushrangers' actions with a renewed sense of urgency. In a hut about 800 yards (730 m) from Sutherland's house, they found a man asleep. After they woke him, he told them that seven of Sutherland's men had lay in wait for them in the hut the previous night and that a number of parties were out searching for them. The bushrangers took the man to show them where to ford the river. After crossing the Isis, they raided "Young's residence", occupied by an old man named McShann. They gathered supplies and forced their two captors to accompany them as they escaped into the bush, releasing them unharmed the next day.

=== The raid on Tibbs' farm ===
On the morning of 31 December 1825, Jeffrey, Perry, and Russell approached two men splitting wood near the hut of a settler named George Barnard that was situated on the Tamar River (in the vicinity of the modern Launceston suburb of Rocherlea). The bushrangers took the two splitters captive but decided not to rob Barnard's hut. Instead, they went towards the house of John Tibbs, who had a grant of land at The Swamp, towards Mowbray Hill (about 5 miles (8 km) from Launceston). As they approached late in the morning, they encountered a young man named Samuel Russell engaged in felling trees. They bound his hands and took him towards the house, where he was ordered to call out his master. When Tibbs appeared, he was ordered to stand. Tibbs, his wife Elizabeth, their five-month-old son John, and one of Barnard's men (named Walker) were taken back into the bush by one of the bushrangers, while Jeffrey and his other companion selected articles from the house for plunder. The goods were put into a bag and knapsack and carried back into the bush by the other of Barnard's men and Tibbs' man, pushed along by the two bushrangers. When the two groups met up, they proceeded towards Mount Direction, keeping a distance from the public road.

After a while, they came upon a man named William Franklin driving Barnard's cart and bullocks. Jeffrey bailed him up and ordered him to join the other captives. During this encounter, a stockkeeper named Isaac Beechy appeared from a neighbouring property owned by a Mr. Basham. Either Perry or Russell confronted Beechy and ordered him to stand; he resisted at first but was eventually made to join the growing band of captives. After the group had travelled a further 2 miles (3 km), it was decided to separate the captives. Perry and Russell took charge of Tibbs his wife, and his child, as well as Beechy and one of Barnard's men. Before the groups separated, both Tibbs' and Beechy's hands were tied due to indications of growing resistance from both men. Jeffrey took charge of the more compliant group, made up of Franklin the bullock driver, one of Barnard's men, and Tibbs' man and went ahead of the other group.

The larger group of captives had gone only about another one-quarter mile (400 m) when Russell lost his patience; he "ordered Tibbs and the Stockkeeper to say their Prayers" after which Russell shot Beechy with his pistol. Perry then fired at Tibbs with a musket he had previously loaded with "gunpowder and seven pistol balls", wounding him in the neck. Despite his wound, Tibbs attempted to run away. Perry ran after him and knocked him to the ground with his musket, but Tibbs' hands had become loose and he managed to regain his feet and escape. Despite his wound, Tibbs was able to reach Launceston where he raised the alarm, prompting an immediate response from the residents. When the first of the rescuers reached the scene, they found Isaac Beechy, severely wounded, but no sign of Elizabeth Tibbs and her infant. Despite medical attention, the stockkeeper eventually died from his wound on 9 January 1826. Jeffrey's only recorded response to the shooting of Beechy and Tibbs was: "had not the two men been so jolly they would not have been shot at".

When Perry and Russell and their remaining captives (including Mrs. Tibbs and her child) caught up with Jeffrey and the other captives, the group kept moving in a northerly direction, the bushrangers anxious to avoid the parties that would be searching for them. After a while Jeffrey took the child from his mother, probably because she was not walking as fast as the bushranger wished her to. Tibbs' man, Samuel Russell, deposed: "my mistress had begged Jeffries not to take her child from her". He described how Jeffrey and Russell separated from the group, taking the child with them. Elizabeth Tibbs was crying and "said the villain is gone to murder my child". By this stage, they were at the back of Barnard's farm. After about fifteen minutes, Jeffrey and Russell arrived back without the child and Jeffrey told Mrs. Tibbs he had "sent it to Mr. Barnard's by one of his Men". However, Jeffrey had lied; either he or Russell had killed the child by swinging him by his feet and smashing his head against a tree. When this shocking murder became known, newspaper reports provided more lurid details. The Colonial Times reported that when Jeffrey returned, Elizabeth Tibbs frantically asked after her child and the bushranger told her "he had dashed its brains out, and that the little innocent had smiled upon him in the bloody act".

The three bushrangers and their captives kept moving through the bush until dark, when they stopped and made a fire. Jeffrey made some tea and offered it to Mrs. Tibbs and Samuel Russell. Jeffrey ordered the other bushrangers to keep watch. He then made a bed "with a Blanket and a kangaroo rug over it" about six yards (5.5 m) from the fire and "he obliged Mrs. Tibbs to lay... with him". By his later deposition, Samuel Russell "heard no conversation pass between" Jeffrey and Russell's mistress, though he did hear her crying and "fretting once during the night". At daybreak they had some breakfast and Jeffrey told Walker and Mrs. Tibbs they were to be released. He went with them to the top of a nearby hill and pointed out the direction they were to go. The remaining group continued to travel north for three hours, after which Jeffrey permitted Franklin to leave. With only one captive remaining (Samuel Russell), the group pressed on.

A man named Pyle, in pursuit of the gang with three others, met with Mrs. Tibbs as she emerged from the bush on 1 January after her ordeal. Pyle had known Elizabeth Tibbs since she was a child and found it "almost impossible to describe the wretched and miserable state of the poor woman". Her light gauze dress had been "torn into shreds by the scrub, and her legs were entirely exposed, with blood oozing from them". The report of the series of events in the Colonial Times newspaper described Mrs. Tibbs as being "in a state of distraction" after "the dæmons" had "murdered her infant". The report added, "We cannot relate the rest", with the implication she had probably been sexually assaulted. Mrs. Tibbs reported that the bushranger Jeffrey was referring to himself as "Captain", and was dressed in a long black overcoat, a red waistcoat, and a kangaroo-skin cap. The body of Mrs. Tibbs young son was located on Saturday, 7 January. The baby's remains had been partly eaten by animals, with one arm and both legs having been devoured.

On 5 January, the colonial authorities approved the offer of a reward for information leading to the apprehension and conviction of the escaped convict "Thomas Jeffries" and his two (unnamed) accomplices, charged with "diverse Robberies, and with firing at and wounding John Tibbs". Rewards of two hundred dollars were offered for information bringing about the apprehension of each of the offenders. A free pardon was offered for relevant information given by a convict "under the Sentence of the Law".

=== Constable Bakie's murder ===
After freeing the last of their captives from the raid on Tibbs' farm, the three fugitives followed the Tamar River, heading in a north-westerly direction towards George Town near the mouth of the Tamar. One morning, arriving at the Pilot's-house near George Town, the bushrangers captured Parish (the pilot), a sailor, and a soldier who had been stationed there as a signal-man. After robbing the buildings of supplies, including the soldier's musket, they headed east with their captives. Later that morning, they released Parish and the sailor, and the following morning freed the soldier.

After keeping on the move for about three days, the three fugitives met up with William Bruce, a mailman. They took him into the bush to camp for the night and examine the letters he was carrying. That evening they heard a man cooee in the distance. The following morning, 11 January 1826, they heard the cooee calls again and Bruce was sent to fetch the man, "no doubt with grim warnings not to alert the stranger about who was waiting for him". When he joined them, the man was found to be Constable Magnus Bakie (or Baker) of George Town, who had been part of a search party hunting for the escapees and had become separated from his group. They confiscated Bakie's weapon and ammunition, tied his hands and loaded him with a knapsack. The bushrangers and their captives then resumed walking in a south-easterly direction parallel to the Tamar Valley. Later, they heard a gun being fired and were compelled to alter their course. Believing Bakie had tried to steer them towards the search parties, Jeffrey called him a "treacherous rascal". They walked on for about four miles (6.4 km) when Jeffrey suddenly announced he was going to shoot the policeman. Bruce begged for Bakie's life, but Jeffrey could not be deterred. As he later recorded in his confession: "I went up and put my pistol to [Bakie's] head and immediately shot him".

=== Cannibalism and separation ===
After Bakie's murder, the three fugitives walked on for another couple of miles (about 3 km) and stopped to eat, then sent the mailman away. Jeffrey and his two companions were compelled to keep moving, with armed parties searching for them in the outlying areas north of Launceston. In the settled districts, they had lived on slaughtered livestock and provisions stolen from settlers and stock-keepers. However, the landscape they were now travelling through between Launceston and George Town was relatively unsettled, and the few farms in the district were likely bases for the search parties hunting them, forcing them to keep to the wild bush and scrub country to evade their pursuers.

After about three days of travelling through the bush they had consumed the food they were carrying. After several more days, Jeffrey shot a cockatoo, their only sustenance for the following three or four days. At that point, "much exhausted for want of food", Jeffrey said to the others (by Perry's later account): "if you like the first man that falls asleep shall be shot, and become food for the other two". Two days later, as they were ascending "a rocky and scrubby high hill", they stopped to rest. Edward Russell fell asleep and Perry, sitting close to him, took a loaded pistol from his knapsack and shot Russell in the forehead and "he expired without a groan". Perry took his knife and cut flesh from Russell's thighs. They made a fire and broiled some of the flesh and ate it, before moving on. A newspaper report after Jeffrey's capture, claiming to be based on his verbal confession, included a differing version of the events preceding Russell's murder. The account in the Colonial Times describes how with Jeffrey and his companions "being rather pressed for food, lots were cast which of his two companions should die — it fell upon Russell — but as the man was armed, he could not effect his purpose until the poor wretch fell asleep from fatigue — when he was murdered, and his flesh served the survivors for food for a few days".

On 19 January, the two fugitives arrived at an unoccupied shepherd's hut on Miller's run (probably south-east of Launceston). After feeding on the provisions found there, they went in search of the shepherd. When he was found, they slaughtered two sheep and returned to the hut where they cut up the animals. They still had a quantity of Russell's flesh in a knapsack which, as Jeffrey later claimed, they "cut into steaks, and fried up with the mutton".

Jeffrey and Perry remained overnight at the shepherd's hut. The following morning they reached another hut. They had approached to within twenty yards (18 m) before they realised it was occupied by a stockman and a search party of two soldiers and three volunteers. According to Jeffrey's later confession, he "challenged them to come out and the first man that handled his firelock I would blow his brains out". A corporal armed with a musket made an appearance and Jeffrey fired into the hut and wounded a soldier named Robert Stubbs. At this, all six occupants ran from the hut, leaving their knapsacks and firearms. The bushrangers took two of the muskets and broke up the rest, as well as tea, sugar, flour, and meat and walked for about a mile into the bush to camp for the night. Taking advantage of it being a moonlit night and conscious that search parties would be about the next day, Perry took their only pot and went in search of water. In doing so, however, he became lost and was unable to find his way back to the campsite.

Just as Jeffrey and Perry became separated, one of the original group of absconders, James Hopkins, was captured. On 21 January, a soldier named McQuin came upon Hopkins, asleep and unarmed; he was captured and taken into custody. Hopkins had been apart from his fellow escapees for a month, after separating from them after the robbery of Joseph Railton's dwelling at Spring Plains (only days after they had absconded). The following day, when Hopkins was being escorted through the streets of Launceston, Mrs. Feutril, mother of Elizabeth Tibbs and grandmother of the murdered infant, mistook one of the constables guarding the prisoner for Jeffrey, "and rushing from her house in a paroxysm of rage, stabbed him with a fork". Fortunately for both parties, the wound was slight.

=== Capture ===
On the morning of Sunday 22 January 1826, three separate parties in search of Jeffrey and his companions had met up at "Mr. Davies's hut" on the bank of the South Esk River near Evandale. The men were inside the hut preparing breakfast. The parties were made up of men representing district landholders: Davies (on whose land the hut was situated), the surveyor and landholder John Wedge, and the holder of a nearby estate named Cox. An aboriginal boy with the group ("belonging to Mr. Cox") observed a man furtively approaching, and exclaimed "There is Jeffries!" Thus alerted, the twelve men remained concealed until the bushranger was "within reach of a musket ball", at which point "one of Mr. Davies's men and one of Mr. Wedge's party rushed out". Jeffrey immediately took cover behind a tree. As the other men emerged from the hut, he asked if "any quarter" would be given; he was answered in the affirmative by Mr. Wedge's man (a convict named William Parsons), who had him covered with his firearm. Jeffrey threw down his arms (a musket and a pistol) and was captured.

Jeffrey was brought into Launceston at about seven o'clock on the evening of his capture. A large crowd had gathered – "men, women, and children, free and prisoners, joined in their personal execrations against the monster". The crowd gathered around the cart conveying Jeffrey to the gaol and "it was with the greatest difficulty imaginable the people were prevented from tearing him to pieces".

After Perry had become separated from Jeffrey, he kept on the move, robbing from huts as the opportunities allowed. At one of the huts he was able to procure a musket. Early on the morning of 31 January, Perry arrived at Leith's farm near Launceston. As he approached, he was sighted by several of Leith's servants from a distance. Upon drawing closer, Perry realised he had been seen and ran off. Two of Leith's assigned servants, John Spong and Francis Barret, set off in pursuit. With the help of "two little dogs", they followed the bushranger's tracks and at last came upon him, standing with his musket levelled at them. Spong also raised his gun and ordered Perry "to throw down his arms... or he might expect no quarter". With this the bushranger dropped his weapon; he was secured and taken to the homestead. Later that day, Perry was taken to Launceston where Jeffrey and Hopkins were being held.

While Jeffrey was incarcerated in the Launceston Gaol awaiting transfer to Hobart for trial, it was reported that he was "writing the History of his own Life, in which he describes crimes of as deep a dye, perpetrated by him in England and Scotland, as even those committed by him in this Island".

Matthew Brady was captured on 11 March 1826 near Watery Plains, about 15 miles from Launceston, after being wounded in the leg. Two of Brady's gang members, James Goodwin and Patrick Bryant, were also captured. Brady and his companions were taken to Launceston Gaol where Jeffrey, Perry, and Hopkins were being held.

=== Court ===
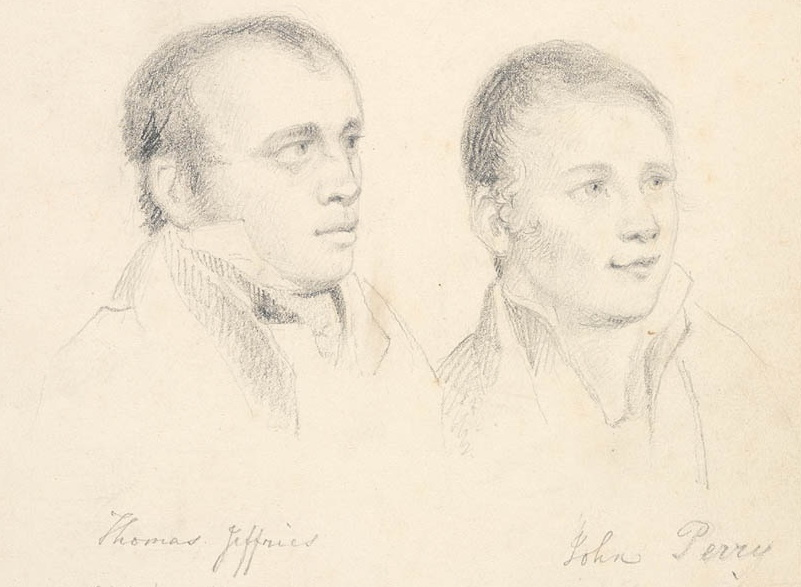
Thomas Jeffrey and John Perry, sketched by Thomas Bock in 1826.

Jeffrey and Perry, along with Brady and his captured gang-members, were transported from Launceston to Hobart aboard the Government brig Prince Leopold, arriving at their destination on 27 March 1826. Hopkins was probably also aboard. At Hobart, a large crowd had gathered to watch as the manacled prisoners were disembarked and marched to the gaol on the corner of Macquarie and Murray streets, where they were all placed in a cell together.

In the early hours of 5 April, the gaoler, John Bisbee, whose bedroom adjoined the cell where Jeffrey and the others were confined, heard "a sort of scratching, which excited his suspicion". Upon investigation, Bisbee found that the prisoners had scraped out the mortar between some of the bricks using a broken spoon and two knives with the intention of making a hole in the wall. Two nights later, the prisoners made another attempt to escape, after which the gaol authorities had them chained to an iron ring bolted to the floor.

On Saturday 22 April 1826, Jeffrey, Perry, and Hopkins were tried and found guilty of stealing the gun, thirty pounds of mutton, and six pounds of salt from the dwelling of Joseph Railton. On the same day, Jeffrey and Perry were tried for the murder of John Tibbs, the five month-old son of John and Elizabeth Tibbs. When Mrs. Tibbs came into the Court "and her eye glanced on the insatiate murderers of her babe, she was so affected as to be unable to stand". She gave evidence describing how the child was taken from her arms and killed by Jeffrey and Russell. Afterwards, when she asked Jeffrey to point out the place where she might find her child's body, he said, "it was no odds it had not suffered a moment's pain in leaving the world". Jeffrey was found guilty of murder and Perry was convicted of "being present aiding & abetting".

On the night of 25 April, Brady, who was still sharing a cell with Jeffrey, told James Dodding, one of the turnkeys at the gaol, that if Jeffrey was not taken from the cell "he would be found in the morning without his head". As a result of this warning, Jeffrey was removed to another cell. Afterwards, Brady voluntarily gave up two knives which he had "concealed about his person". It was reported that Jeffrey "has at last taken to the Bible". He had sent for the Anglican minister William Bedford "and has been crying like a baby".

On 27 April, Jeffrey and Perry were tried for the murder of Magnus Bakie, for which Jeffrey was found guilty. Perry was found "Guilty on the 2nd Count and Not Guilty on the other".

On 29 April, Justice Pedder sentenced Jeffrey, Perry, and Hopkins to death, along with nine others (including Brady, Bryant, Goodwin, and five others of Brady's gang). Jeffrey "appeared much agitated" after the sentence was passed.

=== Execution ===
The death warrant was issued on 2 May, ordering the execution of Jeffrey, Perry, Brady, Bryant, and a murderer named John Thompson on Thursday 4 May 1826. At 8 o'clock on the morning of the execution, the Sheriff brought the condemned men into the gaol lodge to undergo preparations. Jeffrey was the first to be led out, accompanied by Rev. Bedford. It was reported that Jeffrey "appeared firm and composed". As his arms were pinioned, the murderer "prayed fervently, and seemed really penitent". The other prisoners were also led out and all five ascended the scaffold. Rev. Bedford addressed the crowd that "had collected in great numbers outside the gaol", saying: "The unhappy man, Jeffries, now before you, on the verge of eternity, desires me to state, that he attributes all the crimes which he has committed, and which have brought him to his present state, to the abhorrent vice of drunkenness". With the necessary preparations in place for all five men, Bedford "commenced reading certain portions of the funeral service". When he came to a particular passage "the drop fell, and this world closed upon the wretched men for ever!".

When the bodies of Jeffrey and Brady were taken down from the gallows, Dr. Scott, the Colonial Surgeon, took plaster of Paris casts "of their countenances".

The following morning, six members of Brady's gang of bushrangers were also hanged, making full use of the six-man gallows at Hobart Gaol. James Hopkins, who had also been sentenced to death on 29 April, received a reprieve and his sentence was commuted to transportation for life. An important factor in granting the reprieve was probably the fact that Hopkins had separated from his fellow absconders before the murders and other heinous crimes had begun to be committed by his three companions. In December 1826, Hopkins and twelve other prisoners were transported aboard the ship Woodford to "hard labour in the Penal Settlement of Norfolk Island".

== Historical distortion ==
Over a span of forty days, Jeffrey and his gang of convict absconders were responsible for five murders characterised by extreme violence. However, if all the depositions and confessions were accurate, Jeffrey himself unquestionably murdered only one of the victims, Constable Bakie on 11 January. As the leader of the group, he was at least complicit in the murder of the infant John Tibbs, and it was he who initiated the taking of the child from his mother's arms. It was either he or Russell who committed the horrendous act of killing the infant, but both men were certainly culpable. It was Russell who had set in motion the series of killings by murdering Sutherland's unnamed employee on Christmas Day and, a week later, mortally wounding Isaac Beechy. Despite his crimes, very little opprobrium has been attached to Russell, probably because he himself ended up as a victim, shot in the forehead by Perry, his body butchered and his flesh consumed to sustain his former companions.

When details became known of the probable sexual assault of Mrs. Tibbs and the killing of her child, contemporary newspaper reports began describing Jeffrey as a 'monster'. On 7 January, the Hobart Town Gazette referred to him as "that monster in human shape, the murderer Jeffries". On 20 January, the Colonial Times referred to "the monster Jeffries" as "this diabolical villain". After he was apprehended, the colonial newspapers celebrated "the providential capture of this worst of monsters in human shape". As Jeffrey was being marched in manacles from the docks to Hobart Gaol along with Perry, Brady and members of Brady's gang, a correspondent to the Hobart Town Gazette detected evidence of Jeffrey's depravity in his face, stating: "Jeffries is a monster in countenance as in heart, but Brady and his associates have nothing ferocious in their aspect, nor any thing that would lead us to apprehend the dreadful acts they have perpetrated". After Jeffrey was sentenced to death there was a distinct change in tone towards the murderer, with contemporary press reports more likely to refer to indications of his repentance, and alluding to him as one of the group of "unhappy men" that were to be executed.

In 1856, James Bonwick's The Bushrangers was published, an account of the convict system of Van Diemen's Land and the life and crimes of a selection of the bushrangers from the early years of the colony. The book included a short chapter on Jeffrey entitled 'Jeffries, the Monster'. In Bonwick's version of history, Jeffrey "was always notorious for his vile blackguardism". In his retelling of the raid on Tibbs' farm, Bonwick wrote that the woman's husband was "struck senseless" by Jeffrey and "the trembling wife", holding her baby, was made to follow him. As she was walking too slow for his liking, "the demon turned round with awful curses, snatched the baby from her breast, and dashed its brains out against a tree"; he then seized "the frantic mother" and "drove her onward at the point of the knife to his own forest den". Later on, after "this wild beast was hunted down", the mother of the murdered infant was in the crowd as Jeffrey was brought into Launceston. Screaming out "My child! my child!", she "sprang upon the man in the midst of the soldiers, and would have torn him to pieces, if not violently removed".

Bonwick's portrayal was the forerunner for other fanciful accounts of Jeffrey's crimes. Another early chronicler of Australian bushrangers, Charles White, simply paraphrased Bonwick's account of Jeffrey's crimes when he first wrote about the bushranger in 1891. George Boxall's The Story of the Australian Bushrangers was published in 1899. In Boxall's version of history, 'Jefferies', Hopkins and Russell escape from Macquarie Harbour (Perry is not mentioned in his narration). In Boxall's account of the killing of the Tibbs' infant, both parents are present when Jeffrey "dashed its brains out against a sapling", after which he said to Mrs. Tibbs, "Can you go faster now?" Mr. Tibbs then rushed at Jeffrey, who shot him and walked away, leaving "the poor woman" with her dead child and dying husband. These and other inaccurate versions of Jeffrey's crimes became the template for sensationalised articles published in newspapers. One example is a feature article entitled 'Cannibals Who Were "Christians": Devils in Human Guise Preyed on Friends' by J. H. M. Abbott, published in the Sydney Truth newspaper in January 1935.

== See also ==
- List of convicts transported to Australia
- List of incidents of cannibalism
- List of serial killers by country
