= Action (Cypriot political party) =

Action ΔΡΑΣυ Eylem
- Founded: 2014
- Split from: Committee for a Radical Left Rally
- Ideology: Reunification of Cyprus
- Political position: Far-left
- Colours: Purple

Website
- www.drasy-eylem.org

Action (Greek: ΔΡΑΣυ, Drasy; Turkish: Eylem) was a Cypriot bi-communal political alliance formed to contest the 2014 elections to the European Parliament, bringing together Greek and Turkish Cypriots in an electoral alliance for the first time since the formation of the Republic of Cyprus in 1960. In Greek the alliance name is often stylized as Δ.Ρ.Α.Συ (D.R.A.Sy), a contrived acronym that stands for Bicommunal Radical Left Cooperation (Greek: Δικοινοτική Ριζοσπαστική Αριστερή Συνεργασία, Dikoinotikí Rizospastikí Aristerí Synergasía).

== European Parliament election, 2014 ==
The alliance's electoral slate comprised 4 Greek Cypriots and 2 Turkish Cypriots.

The alliance polled 0.9% of the vote. Some commentators saw Action's low vote as a reflection of a deep-rooted division of the two communities. The Friedrich Ebert Foundation considered it the result of a failure to sufficiently distinguish itself from AKEL and to overcome that party's historical organisational advantage.
