= Deveron (1814 ship) =

History

United Kingdom
- Name: Deveron
- Namesake: River Deveron
- Launched: 1814, Monkwearmouth, Sunderland
- Fate: Wrecked 21 July 1833

General characteristics
- Tons burthen: 243, or 254, or 261, or 272 (bm)
- Length: 87 ft 11 in (26.8 m)
- Beam: 25 ft 7 in (7.8 m)
- Sail plan: Snow, then brig, then from 1830 barque

Deveron was launched at Sunderland in 1814. She initially traded with Argentina and then from 1822 with Van Diemen's Land. Her owner, William Wilson, transferred her registry to Hobart. She traded with England, and between Hobart and Port Jackson. From 1830, she engaged in whaling off New Zealand. She was lost on 21 July 1833 while looking for whales off the Australian coast.

== Career ==
Deveron first appeared in Lloyd's Register (LR) in 1814. She was associated with the Wilson family of Banff, Scotland, either owned by William Wilson or his father John Wilson. William's brother James Milne Wilson became premier of Tasmania.

Year	Master	Owner	Trade	Source
1814	Wilson	Wilson, Sr.	London–Buenos Aires	LR
1822	Wilson	Wilson, Sr.	Cork; London–Van Diemen's Land	LR

On 19 June 1822, Deveron, William Wilson, master, arrived at Van Diemen's Land from London. On 28 October, Actaeon struck the rocks in D'Entrecasteaux Channel. The crew abandoned ship and the officers and some of the crew sailed her longboat to Hobart where they reported the wreck. Deveron and His Majesty's Colonial Brig Prince Leopold went to salvage as much cargo as possible and pick up the remaining crew. They salvaged 300 barrels of pork from Actaeon's mixed cargo of wine, spirits, coal, pork, soap, and other goods.

Deveron proceeded to trade between Van Diemen's Land and Port Jackson, and between England and Van Diemen's Land. In addition to trading with England, Deveron on occasion ferried troops and convicts between Port Jackson and Hobart.

Wilson transferred Derwent's registry to Hobart. Between March and May 1830, he had her fitted out for whaling, at a cost of £6000, including a conversion to a three-masted barque-rig. She returned to Hobart from New Zealand on 2 November 1830, with 200 tuns (272 butts) of whale oil, some of it sperm oil), and 17 or 20 tons of whale bone. (Note: When Deveron docked at Hobart in November 1830, she was the first vessel to use the New Wharf. Construction of the New Wharf had only been begun in April and was not completed until 1834.) While she was fishing she lost six or eight seamen in a boat.

The loss of the boat led Deveron's master, Captain Lovett, to cut her voyage short. On 28 September, she had two boats examining a bay when a sudden squall capsized one of the two boats. The weather was such that the boat still afloat could not come to the aid of the men in the boat lost. One account states that the casualties consisted of the first and third mates, and four seamen. When Deveron returned to port she was an almost full ship, and the cargo she had gathered over her five months cruise was valued at £5000.

On 18 April 1832, Deveron, Lovett, master, returned from a whaling voyage with 100 tuns of sperm oil.

By some reports, Deveron, James Curry, master, made a good whaling cruise to the Solomon Islands.

== Fate ==
Deveron, of Hobart, James Curry, master, sailed from Hobart on 27 July 1832, and Port Jackson on 5 September, to engage in whaling.

In April 1833, she had been reported to have been at the Bay of Islands with 600 tons of whale oil.) In early June 1833, she had to put into Moreton Bay to effect repairs. She then returned to whaling off the "Eastern Islands". On 19 (or 21) July, her crew abandoned her sinking off Cape Byron or Coff's Bay. She had 600 barrels of whale oil on board. The crew reached Trial Bay after four days in Deveron's boats. Two of her four boats set out from Trial Bay to get help and one reached Port Macquarie. A party of soldiers then marched overland and rescued the other survivors. (Note: Lloyd's List for 7 January 1834, reported her abandonment on 19 July 1833, off Cape Byron. It gave her master's name, as "Cowie".)

There have been suggestions that Deveron, James Curry, master, had been wrecked in Moreton Bay. However, that has been found to be incorrect.
