= Action Jackson =

Action Jackson may refer to:

== People ==
- Lamar Jackson (born 1997), American football quarterback
- William Jackson (gangster) (1920–1961), American gangster

== Other uses ==
- Action Jackson (1988 film), an American action film
  - Action Jackson (soundtrack)
- Action Jackson (2014 film), an Indian Hindi action comedy film
- Action Jackson (toy), a product line of action figures
