= Solomon Blay =

English convict

- Born: 20 January 1816; Oxford, England
- Died: 19 August 1897 (aged 81); Hobart, Tasmania
- Other name: Solomon Bleay
- Occupation: Hangman
- Years active: 1840–1891
- Spouse: Mary Murphy

Solomon Blay (or Bleay) (20 January 1816 – 18 August 1897) was an English convict transported to the Australian penal colony of Van Diemen's Land (present-day Tasmania). Once his sentence was served, he gained notoriety as a hangman in Hobart, and is believed to have hanged over 200 people in the course of a long career spanning from 1837 to 1887. This made him the longest serving hangman in the British Empire.

== Early life and Transportation to Australia ==
Blay (or Bleay) was born in Oxford, England and convicted of theft several times. After being involved in attempted counterfeiting base coin (which was a crime punishable by death) he was sentenced and transported to Australia in 1836 aboard the ship Sarah.

== Arrival in Australia ==
He disembarked on 29 March 1837 at Hobart at 21 years of age, While still a convict he became a police constable in Brighton, 27 kilometres north of Hobart, but lost the position due to lack of discipline with alcohol and was sent to a chain gang. He unsuccessfully tried to escape.

== As a hangman ==
In 1840, he applied for the position of hangman and he performed his first hanging in at the age of 25. He married a young Irish convict named Mary Murphy but was a social outcast due to his work, often having to spend days walking to his executions as no one would give him a lift, or eat outside at a coachhouse as he was not welcome in the warmth of the eating establishment.

He lived in Oatlands, and executed prisoners at the gaol there, but travelled all over Tasmania to execute prisoners. He used the short drop method of hanging for many years, which essentially kills by strangulation. Later he adopted the more humane long drop method.

In 1857, he received a full pardon on account of his usefulness to the government. He executed three women during his service, the last in 1862 when he executed Margaret Coghlan, who had stabbed her husband to death.

He often had difficulties obtaining transportation as some coachmen would refuse to transport him or his fellow passengers should shun him (a speculation that was completely untrue, as he was issued a coach ticket that he cashed in to save toward his return to England.

As hangman he was paid a modest wage, a payment per hanging, and was entitled to keep the clothes of the prisoners he hung. With his wife he sold the clothes for extra income. He and his wife attempted to relocate to England but his identity was discovered and he had no choice but to return to Tasmania and plead for his job back.

He performed his last hanging at the age of 71 when he executed Tim Walker, an old man who had stabbed a prostitute to death.

=== Feud with Martin Cash ===
In 1843, Martin Cash had been found guilty of the murder of Constable Peter Winstanley who was shot by Cash and died two days later. Cash was sentenced to death by hanging, but a last minute reprieve saw him sentenced to transportation for life at Norfolk Island. Blay could never understand why Cash was sent to Norfolk Island instead of the gallows. When Cash returned to Hobart after the closure of the Norfolk Island penal colony in 1854, the pair paths frequently crossed. When meeting, they taunted each other.

Cash in his memoirs wrote, "Of all the wretches attached to or in the employ of Her Majesty's Government there are none so truly contemptible as the flagellator, and in all my experiences through life I never knew a man with one redeeming feature who ever filled that odious office. I generally found them to be treacherous, cruel, and cowardly ..."

== Death and burial ==
Blay died from dropsy at the General Hospital in Hobart on 19 August 1897. He was buried in an unmarked pauper's grave at Cornelian Bay, Hobart, Tasmania.

== See also ==
- List of convicts transported to Australia

== Bibliography ==
- Harris, Steve (2015). Solomon's Noose: The True Story of Her Majesty's Hangman of Hobart. Melbourne: Melbourne Books. ISBN 9781922129741.
