= Action Force (disambiguation) =

Action Force is a 1980s range of European action figures.

Action Force may also refer to:

- Action Force (video game), a 1987 video game
- Action Force (comic strip), a British weekly comic strip
- Action Force or Action Force Monthly, UK comic series featuring reprints of G.I. Joe comics
