= Actaeon (1815 ship) =

History

United Kingdom
- Owner: 1815:J. Scott & Co.; 1819:Fairlie & Co., Calcutta
- Launched: 1815
- Fate: Wrecked, 28 October 1822
- Notes: Hackman conflates this Acteon with Actaeon

General characteristics
- Tons burthen: 300, or 305 (bm)

Actaeon (or Actæon, or Acteon) was launched at Fort Gloster, India, in 1815. She was wrecked without loss of life on 28 October 1822 in the D'Entrecasteaux Channel in southern Tasmania.

Actaeon was originally owned by J. Scott & Co. of Calcutta. She was then sold at Mauritius.

== Loss ==
Actaeon, under the command of Captain John Mackay, left Mauritius on 6 September 1822 bound for Sydney. She struck the rocks in D'Entrecasteaux Channel around midnight on 28 October and the crew abandoned ship. The officers and some of the crew took the longboat and made for Hobart, where they reported the wreck. Deveron and HM Colonial Brig Prince Leopold went to salvage as much cargo as possible and pick up the remaining crew. Some 300 barrels of pork were salvaged from Actaeon's mixed cargo of wine, spirits, coal, pork, soap, and other goods. A gale totally wrecked Actaeon and one of the salvagers was drowned.

Captain John Mackay named the island and reef group where Acteon was wrecked Actaeon Island.
