= Actaeon (1815 Topsham ship) =

History

United Kingdom
- Name: Actaeon
- Namesake: Actaeon
- Builder: Thomas Owen, Topsham, Devon
- Launched: 19 December 1815
- Fate: Probably condemned in 1828

General characteristics
- Tons burthen: 185, or 18546/94 (bm)
- Notes: Hackman mis-attributes the loss in 1822 at Tasmania of Actaeon to this Actaeon.

Actaeon was launched at Topsham, Devon in 1815. She traded widely and from 1823, she made some voyages to Bombay under a license from the British East India Company (EIC). She then traded with what is now Peru, and was probably condemned in what is now Chile in 1828.

== Career ==
Acteon first appeared in Lloyd's Register (LR) in 1816.

Year	Master	Owner	Trade	Source & notes
1816	R.Fulton	Piric & Co.	Topsham–Liverpool	LR
1820	W.Stewart	Piric & Co.	London–Demerara	LR
1823	W.Stewart; J.Briggs	T.Reid; J.Briggs	London–Genoa; London–Bombay	LR; damages & thorough repair 1823

In 1813, the EIC had lost its monopoly on the trade between India and Britain. British ships were then free to sail to India or the Indian Ocean under a license from the EIC.

On 6 December 1823, J.Briggs sailed Actaeon sailed for Bombay under a license from the EIC. She arrived at Bombay on 28 May 1824. She sailed from there on 24 June, and arrived back at Deal on 17 November.

On 1 June 1825, Actaeon, Briggs, master, sailed from Gravesend for Lima. That same day she arrived at Deal, preparing to sail for Valparaiso. On 31 August, she arrived at Rio de Janeiro. On 17 September, she sailed for Valparaiso, and she arrived there on 18 November. On 20 April 1826, she arrived at Valparaiso, again from Callao.

Year	Master	Owner	Trade	Source & notes
1826	Briggs	Briggs	London-Lima	Register of Shipping; damages and large repair 1823
1826	Briggs	Briggs	London–Île de France (Mauritius)	LR; damages and large repair 1823

== Fate ==
Actaeon's fate is currently obscure. She was last listed in LR in 1829, with data stale since 1826. The Register of Shipping last listed her in 1832, also with data unchanged since 1826. However, Lloyd's List reported on 2 December 1828, that Actaeon, Gaymer, master, had been condemned at Talcahuano. Actaeon is an unusual name (there were only two in the registers at this time with the other Actaeon being a coaster), so it is most probable, but absent original research not certain, that this account is correct.
