= Action (theatre) =

Action as a term in Western theatre practice refers to a principle from actor training first developed by Russian actor and theatre director Konstantin Stanislavski in the first half of the 20th century at the Moscow Art Theatre. It forms part of his overall structure of systematized acting training, most frequently called the System, which in its turn gave rise to Method Acting.

In his writings on theatre, Stanislavski states "The basis of theatre is doing, dynamism. [...] In Latin, the corresponding word is actio, and the root of this same word has passed into our vocabulary, "action", "actor", "act". So, drama is an action we can see being performed, and, when he comes on, the actor becomes an agent in that action" and "acting is action - mental and physical." Jean Benedetti understands action in a Stanislavskian context more simply as "What is done in order to fulfill a Task," a Task in its turn referring to "What a character has to do, the problem he has to solve." Action as a term in theatre practice derived from the Stanislavski System therefore refers to that which a character undertakes in order to achieve a goal.
