= Matthew Brady =

English-born Tasmanian bushranger (1799–1826)

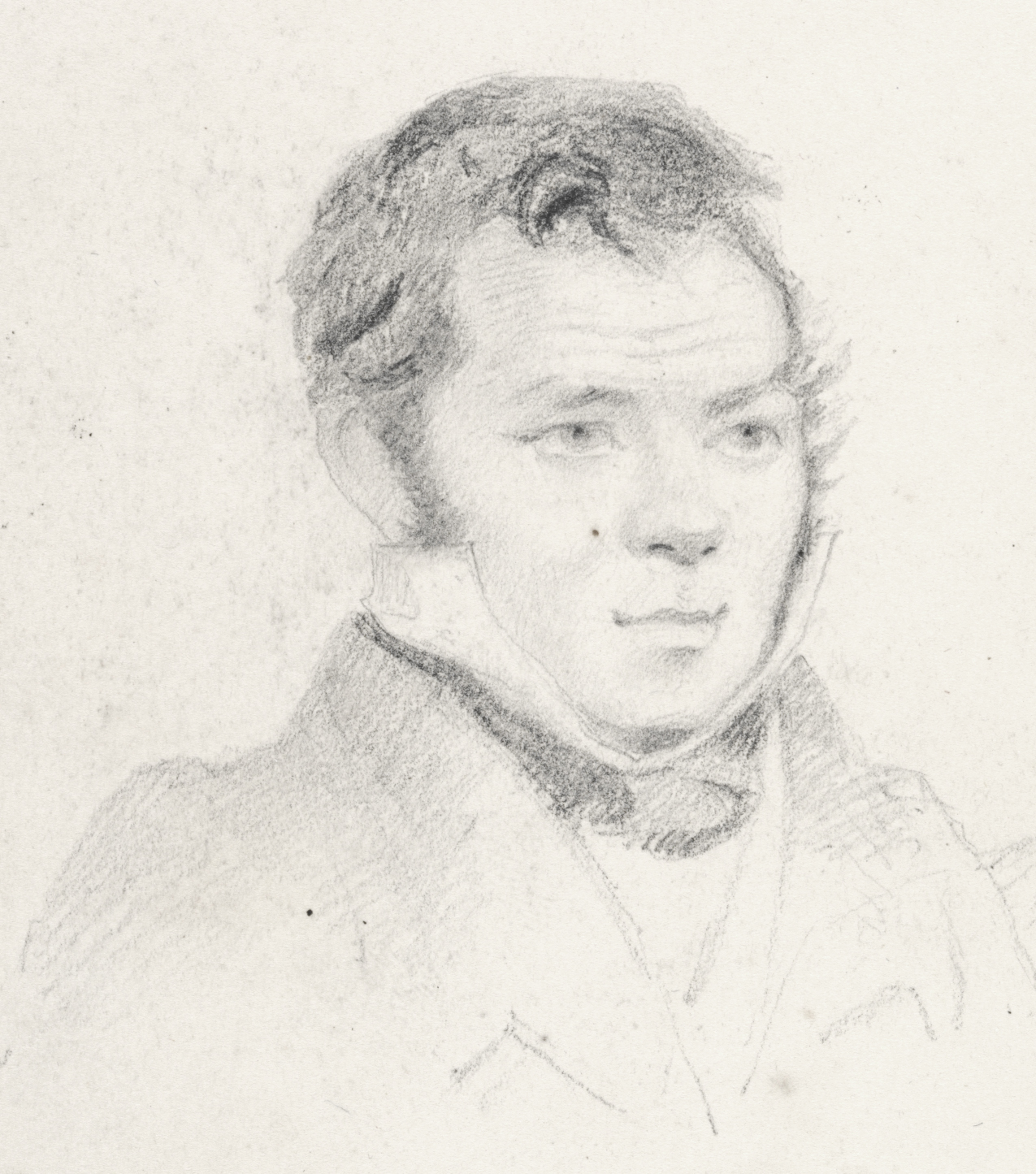
- Born: 1799; Manchester, England
- Died: May 4, 1826 (aged 26–27); Hobart, Tasmania, Australia
- Conviction: Murder
- Penalty: Hanging

Matthew Brady (1799 – 4 May 1826) was an English-born convict who became a bushranger in Van Diemen's Land (modern-day Tasmania). He was sometimes known as "Gentleman Brady" due to his good treatment and fine manners when robbing his victims.

== Early life ==
Brady, whose proper name was Bready, was born in Manchester at just about the close of 18th century. His occupation in England was that of a gentleman's servant, probably a groom, as he was an excellent and even a graceful rider, and perfect in his horsemanship.

== Convict years ==
Brady was convicted of stealing a basket, some butter, bacon, sugar, and rice — or perhaps forgery — and tried at Lancaster on 17 April 1820. He received a seven-year sentence of transportation, arriving in Australia in the convict ship Juliana on 29 December 1820.

He rebelled against the conditions in Sydney and received, over time, a total of 450 lashes between 1821 and 1826 in punishment for misdemeanours and attempts to escape. In 1823, he was sent to the new penal settlement at Sarah Island in Macquarie Harbor, which had been established 'for secondary offenders and desperate prisoners'.

On 7 June 1824, Brady was part of a group of fifteen escapees from Sarah Island who sailed a whaleboat around the south coast to the River Derwent and spent the next two years as bushrangers.

== Bushranging ==
Brady was considered a gentleman who rarely robbed or insulted women. The military considered him a dangerous bushranger after Brady's gang held up the township of Sorell and captured the local garrison (in which the garrison commander, Lieut. William Gunn was shot in the arm, which was subsequently amputated).

On 14 April 1825 Lieut. Governor George Arthur advertised a proclamation detailing rewards for the capture of Brady and his gang of 100 Guineas or 300 acres of free hold land, plus a free pardon for any convict assisting their capture.

In return, Brady posted his own reward stating:

It has caused Matthew Brady much concern that such a person known as Sir George Arthur is at large. Twenty gallons of rum will be given to any person that will deliver his person unto me. I also caution John Priest that I will hang him for his ill-treatment of Mrs. Blackwell at Newtown.

— 'M. BRADY.'

In November 1825, a description of the Brady's gang of bushrangers was published, provided by Mr. R. Denne, overseer for Silas Gatehouse near Grindstone Bay (100 kilometres (60 mi) north-east of Hobart). Denne had spent six days in the custody of the gang. He described his captors as having no fixed leader, "though the opinions of Brady or Dunne are generally listened to", adding that "they frequently debate and quarrel for hours together, about their future proceedings". Denne provided the following descriptions of the gang members:

- Brady, called 'Mat' by his comrades, was described as being "stout, square-built", and slightly marked with smallpox.
- Dunne was taller, "with red whiskers, and pock-pitted".
- Bird was dark, tall and athletic, with "the appearance of a gipsy"; he had lost part of one of his fingers.
- McKenney was shorter, stouter, and "fresh complexioned".
- Brown was described as being deaf.
- Murphy was a "little man", with "a piece of gold lace, with a precious stone, round his cap".
- Cody was "subject, at times, to dreadful stings of conscience".
- Bryan (no description beyond his name).

On 4 March 1826, Brady and his gang of fourteen attacked Mr. Dry's homestead at night. It was a new moon so the night was particularly dark. A servant managed to run to town and call alarm. A posse of troopers responded and a gunfight ensued. No one was killed and the bushrangers slipped away into the night. Three days later, Brady rode to Tom Kenton's farm and shot him dead. It was a payback for Kenton setting a trap on Brady. Brady was briefly captured but managed to escape and swore revenge. Days later Brady and his gang captured a boat, intending to sail it to the Australian mainland. However, due to bad weather crossing Bass Strait, they were forced to turn back.

=== Capture ===
After the sailing fiasco, one of Brady's gang members, an ex-convict name Cowan, betrayed him for a pardon. On 28 March 1826, in consequence of private information, Lieutenant Williams of the 57th Regiment with 14 soldiers and four armed prisoners made contact with Brady's gang south of Launceston. Both parties fired, and during the ensuing gun battle Brady was wounded in the leg. The bushrangers separated as they fled. Two stragglers were caught by local farmers.

Brady and four others made it as far as Watery Plains (24 kilometres (15 mi) south-east of Launceston). On 1 April, a campfire was spotted and John Batman and party went to investigate. The outlaws all fled into the bush, abandoning their fire. Batman and his crew stayed near the campfire. During the night Batman heard a noise and went out to investigate. He saw a man limping in the bush near a shallow creek and hastened towards him; it was Brady. Batman induced Brady to surrender and return with him. The outlaw was ill and suffering much pain and did as he was asked.

In the morning of 2 April, Batman delivered Brady to the Launceston gaol. News quickly spread that Brady was caught and the townsfolk turned out to see the captured felon pass by on horseback.

=== Sentencing ===
On 27 April 1826, Brady and Patrick Bryant pleaded guilty to the murder with malice of Thomas Kenton. The same two also pleaded guilty of stealing four horses from Mr. Lawrence. Brady made a guilty plea to the additional charge of setting fire to a dwelling, and not guilty to the charge of robbing from the person. It was this last crime for which Brady was sentenced to death.

== Death ==
Brady was hanged on 4 May 1826, at the old Hobart gaol. Four other bushrangers were hanged with him: Patrick Bryant, John Perry, John Thompson, and Thomas Jeffrey. Brady complained bitterly at being hanged alongside Jeffrey, who, as Brady pointed out, was an informer as well as a cannibal and mass murderer. There were multiple unsuccessful petitions to halt his execution, and his cell was filled with wine, fruit, cakes, confectionary, and flowers from the ladies of Hobart Town.

The Herald wrote of his death:

There was a hush, broken only by stifled sobs, as the bushranger knelt to receive the last consolations of his faith. Then, standing erect, he bade adieu to the multitude and died more like a martyr than a convicted felon.

== Legacy ==
One of his hideouts is now known as Brady's Lookout and is a popular picnic area with views over the Tamar River. Another one of his hide outs can be found at Notley Hills Gorge, with a bush walk, and an information board about Brady.

His life was dramatised on radio in "The Capture of Sorrell Gaol", an episode of Thereby Hangs a Tale in 1950.

In 1955, he was the subject of a radio feature Matt Brady, Fabulous Bushranger: The Adventures of a Gay Man.

== See also ==
- List of convicts transported to Australia
