= List of members of the House of Representatives (Cyprus), 2011–2016 =

This is a list of the 56 members of the House of Representatives of Cyprus, following the 2011 legislative election.

== List of elected members 2011 ==
Name	National party	Constituency	# of votes
Adamos Adamou	Progressive Party of Working People	Limassol	
Nicos Anastasiades	Democratic Rally	Limassol	
Antonis Antoniou	Democratic Party	Paphos	
Irene Charalambidou	Progressive Party of Working People	Nicosia	
Lefteris Christoforou	Democratic Rally	Famagusta	
Costas Constantinou	Democratic Rally	Paphos	
Neophytos Constantinou	Democratic Party	Nicosia	
Costas Costa	Progressive Party of Working People	Limassol	
Aristos Damianou	Progressive Party of Working People	Nicosia	
Stella Demetriou Misiaouli	Progressive Party of Working People	Nicosia	
Efthimios Diplaros	Democratic Rally	Limassol	
Stavros Evagorou	Progressive Party of Working People	Famagusta	
Andreas Fakontis	Progressive Party of Working People	Paphos	
Sophoclis Fittis	Democratic Party	Kyrenia	
Marios Garoyian	Democratic Party	Nicosia	
Yiannakis Gavriel	Progressive Party of Working People	Famagusta	
Haris Georgiades	Democratic Rally	Nicosia	
Georgios Georgiou	Democratic Rally	Famagusta	
Giorgos Georgiou	Progressive Party of Working People	Larnaca	
Christakis Giovannis	Progressive Party of Working People	Famagusta	
Kyriacos Hadjiyianni	Democratic Rally	Famagusta	
Andros Kafkalias	Progressive Party of Working People	Limassol	
Nicos Katsourides	Progressive Party of Working People	Nicosia	
Koutra Koukouma (Skevi)	Progressive Party of Working People	Famagusta	
Zacharias Koulias	Democratic Party	Famagusta	
Nikos Koutsou	Citizens Alliance	Famagusta	
Andreas Kyprianou	Democratic Rally	Limassol	
Andros Kyprianou	Progressive Party of Working People	Nicosia	
Stella Kyriakides	Democratic Rally	Nicosia	
Athina Kyriakidou	Democratic Party	Limassol	
Yiannos Lamaris	Progressive Party of Working People	Limassol	
George Loukaides	Progressive Party of Working People	Nicosia	
Marios Mavrides	Democratic Rally	Kyrenia	
Roula Mavronicola	Movement for Social Democracy	Nicosia	
Christos Mesis	Progressive Party of Working People	Limassol	
Andreas Michaelides	Democratic Rally	Limassol	9,872
Tasos Mitsopoulos	Democratic Rally	Larnaca	
Averof Neofytou	Democratic Rally	Nicosia	
Nicos Nicolaides	Movement for Social Democracy	Limassol	4,443
Ionas Nicolaou	Democratic Rally	Nicosia	
Yiannakis Omirou	Movement for Social Democracy	Nicosia	
Nikolas Papadopoulos	Democratic Party	Nicosia	
Pambos Papageorgiou	Progressive Party of Working People	Kyrenia	
George Perdikes	Ecological and Environmental Movement	Nicosia	
Andreas Pitsillides	Democratic Rally	Nicosia	
George Prokopiou	Democratic Party	Larnaca	
Sotiris Sampson	Democratic Rally	Famagusta	
Fidias Sarikas	Movement for Social Democracy	Paphos	
Panikkos Stavrianos	Progressive Party of Working People	Larnaca	
Christos Stylianides	Democratic Rally	Nicosia	
Demetris Syllouris	European Party	Nicosia	
Georgios Tasou	Democratic Rally	Larnaca	
Nicos Tornaritis	Democratic Rally	Nicosia	
George Varnava	Movement for Social Democracy	Famagusta	
Angelos Votsis	Democratic Party	Limassol	
Zacharias Zachariou	Democratic Rally	Larnaca	

== List of observers ==
Name	Notes
Antonis Hadjiroussos	Representative of the Maronite community
Vartkes Mahdessian	Representative of the Armenian community
Benito Antonio Mantovani	Representative of the Latin community

== Sources ==
- Biographical notes – Parliament of Cyprus
