= Recognition of same-sex unions in Cyprus =

Cyprus has recognised same-sex civil unions since 9 December 2015. Legislation to establish a form of partnership known as civil cohabitation was introduced by the ruling Democratic Rally party in July 2015, and approved by the House of Representatives in a 39–12 vote on 26 November 2015. It was signed by President Nicos Anastasiades, and took effect on 9 December upon publication in the government gazette.

Same-sex marriage is not recognized in Cyprus, though President Nikos Christodoulides has expressed support for its legalisation.

== Civil cohabitations ==
Laws regarding same-sex partnerships in Europe¹ Marriage Civil union Limited domestic recognition (cohabitation) Unrecognized Constitution limits marriage to opposite-sex couples ¹ May include recent laws or court decisions that have not yet entered into effect.

=== Background ===
In 2010, Interior Ministry Permanent Secretary Lazaros Savvides stated that the government was considering whether to legalise same-sex marriage in Cyprus. In 2013, Interior Minister Eleni Mavrou announced that her ministry was drafting a parliamentary bill to establish civil partnerships, which subsequently received official government approval. In March of that year, President Nicos Anastasiades, who had been elected in the 2013 presidential election, reaffirmed his support for the bill. In November 2013, Interior Minister Socratis Hasikos confirmed that the bill remained on the government agenda. A draft was prepared and sent to other ministries for review, with the intention of holding a parliamentary vote in April 2014. However, in June 2014, Interior Ministry Permanent Secretary Constantinos Nicolaides confirmed that a vote on the bill had been delayed. Hasikos explained that the proposal would require "consensus from all political parties before moving forward". He distributed copies of the bill to party leaders and requested they review it before a second meeting in September, stressing that no vote would be held until he was certain of unanimous party support.

In March 2014, Archbishop Chrysostomos II, the head of the Church of Cyprus, signalled his opposition to plans to introduce either civil partnership or marriage rights, urging churches to take a stand against homosexuality and accusing secular governments of "weakening moral integrity" through acknowledging equal rights to gay people: "When, for example, governments legalise not only plain civil partnership but 'homosexual marriage', the Church must be unequivocal in condemning homosexuality."

=== Passage of legislation in 2015 ===
On 6 May 2015, the Council of Ministers approved a bill establishing gender-neutral "cohabitation agreements", offering many of the rights, benefits and responsibilities of marriage. On 6 June, the ruling Democratic Rally (DISY) party announced its support for the partnership bill. It had its first reading on 18 June. On 1 July, the House of Representatives decided to rename the proposed partnership scheme to "civil cohabitation". The second reading was initially scheduled for 9 July, but was postponed until autumn. The bill passed its final reading on 26 November 2015 in a 39–12 vote with 3 abstentions, with those voting in favour being members of the ruling DISY party, the Democratic Party, the Progressive Party of Working People, the Movement for Social Democracy, the Ecological and Environmental Movement, and the European Party. The law was signed by President Anastasiades, published in the Official Gazette of the Republic of Cyprus on 9 December 2015 and took effect that same day. The first civil partnership was registered on 29 January 2016 between two women. The first public ceremony was held in Nicosia on 4 March 2016 between Marios Frixou and Fanos Eleftheriades.

26 November 2015 vote in the House of Representatives
Party	Voted for	Voted against	Abstained	Absent (Did not vote)
G Democratic Rally	14: Costas Constantinou; Georgios Georgiou; Kyriacos Hadjiyianni; Stella Kyriakides; Maria Kyriakou; Rikkos Mappouridis; Marios Mavrides; Andreas Michaelides; Averof Neofytou; Nikos Nouris; Prodromos Prodromos; Sotiris Sampson; Nicos Tornaritis; Zacharias Zachariou	6: Efthimios Diplaros; Evgenios Hamboullas; Andreas Kyprianou; Aristotelis Misos; Georgios Tasou; Andreas Themistocleous	–	–
Progressive Party of Working People	18: Adamos Adamou; Irene Charalambidou; Costas Costa; Aristos Damianou; Stella Demetriou Misiaouli; Stavros Evagorou; Andreas Fakontis; Yiannakis Gavriel; Giorgos Georgiou; Christakis Giovannis; Andros Kafkalias; Nicos Katsourides; Koutra Koukouma; Andros Kyprianou; Yiannos Lamaris; George Loukaides; Christos Messis; Pambos Papageorgiou	1: Panikkos Stavrianos	–	–
Democratic Party	2: Athina Kyriakidou; Nikolas Papadopoulos	3: Antonis Antoniou; Sophoclis Fittis; George Prokopiou	3: Neophytos Constantinou; Marios Garoyian; Angelos Votsis	–
Movement for Social Democracy	3: Roula Mavronicola; Nicos Nicolaides; Fidias Sarikas	–	–	1: George Varnava
Citizens' Alliance	–	1: Nikos Koutsou	–	–
Ecological and Environmental Movement	1: George Perdikes	–	–	–
G European Party	1: Demetris Syllouris	–	–	–
Independent	–	1: Zacharias Koulias	–	–
Total (Note: The House of Representatives has 55 voting members. The President of the House of Representatives, Yiannakis Omirou, votes only in case of a tied vote. The 24 seats allocated to Turkish Cypriots have been vacant since 1964.)	39	12	3	1
Total	70.9%	21.8%	5.5%	1.8%

The legislation established a partnership scheme known as civil cohabitation (Greek: πολιτική συμβίωση, politikí symvíosi, pronounced [politiˈci simˈvi.osi]; Turkish: sivil birliktelik, pronounced [siˈvil biɾlicteˈlic]) providing several of the legal rights and benefits of marriage, including hospital visitation rights, tax benefits and property rights, but excluding adoption rights. The partnerships are available to both same-sex and opposite-sex couples.

=== Statistics ===
By 18 April 2016, eight same-sex partnerships had been registered in Cyprus. By October of the same year, this number had risen to about 70. Civil partnerships are also popular among different-sex couples: as of August 2017, they accounted for roughly 70% of all registrations, with same-sex couples making up the remaining 30%. By December 2020, around 1,700 partnerships had been recorded, 90% of them between different-sex couples. This figure increased to 5,037 by the end of 2024, of which 415 involved same-sex partners.

== Same-sex marriage ==
=== Developments in 2024–present ===
The Constitution of Cyprus does not explicitly ban same-sex marriages. Article 22 states that "[a]ny person reaching nubile age is free to marry and to found a family according to the law relating to marriage, applicable to such person under the provisions of this Constitution." In September 2022, activists campaigned for legalization at Cyprus Pride. A number of candidates running in the 2023 presidential election stated their support for same-sex marriage, including the winner, Nikos Christodoulides, and runner-up Andreas Mavroyiannis. Following the legalization of same-sex marriage in Greece in February 2024, a government spokesman said that "politicians and society are not ready for gay marriage and adoption" but that "at some point this dialogue will be opened in Cyprus". In May 2024, the President of the House of Representatives, Annita Demetriou, said that "Cyprus is not yet ready" for the legalization of same-sex marriage. However, in March 2024, Kathimerini predicted the issue to "soon come to the political forefront". The Progressive Party of Working People, the Movement of Ecologists – Citizens' Cooperation and Volt Cyprus have expressed support for same-sex marriage.

In a legal case involving a dual Polish-German couple who had married in Germany but sought recognition of their marriage in Poland, Jakub Cupriak-Trojan and Mateusz Trojan v Wojewoda Mazowiecki, the European Court of Justice (ECJ) ruled on 25 November 2025 that Poland must recognise same-sex marriages performed in other member states of the European Union. The ruling had an immediate legal effect in Cyprus as well, with media outlets reporting that "authorities must recognize same-sex marriages performed abroad as full marriages, rather than just granting them the limited rights of a registered partnership". Cupriak-Trojan and Trojan does not compel Cyprus to change its domestic laws to legalise same-sex marriage, but it does require that the country accept the legal status of couples married elsewhere in the European Union.

=== Religious performance ===
The Church of Cyprus strongly opposes same-sex unions. In March 2014, Archbishop Chrysostomos II signalled his opposition to plans to introduce either civil partnerships or same-sex marriage, accusing secular governments of "weakening moral integrity" through acknowledging equal rights to gay people: "When, for example, governments legalise not only plain civil partnership but 'homosexual marriage', the Church must be unequivocal in condemning homosexuality." In 2024, Archbishop George III reiterated the Church's opposition to same-sex marriage, further stating that it would continue "to speak the truth and preach to the world to avoid any deviation from the law of God."

== Public opinion ==
The 2006 Eurobarometer found that only 14% of Cypriots were in favour of same-sex marriage. This was the third lowest in the European Union at the time, above only Latvia and Romania. The 2015 Eurobarometer found that support had increased to 37%, while 56% were opposed.

A 2014 survey found that 53% of Cypriots supported civil unions or partnerships for same-sex couples.

The 2019 Eurobarometer found that 36% of Cypriots thought same-sex marriage should be allowed throughout Europe, while 60% were opposed. The 2023 Eurobarometer showed that support had increased to 50%, while 44% were opposed. The survey also found that 46% of Cypriots thought that "there is nothing wrong in a sexual relationship between two persons of the same sex", while 50% disagreed. This was the first time an opinion poll had found majority support for same-sex marriage in Cyprus, showing a steady increase in support for LGBT rights.

== See also ==
- LGBT rights in Cyprus
- Recognition of same-sex unions in Europe
- Same-sex marriage in Akrotiri and Dhekelia
