= List of members of the House of Representatives (Cyprus), 2016–2021 =

This is a list of the 56 members of the House of Representatives of Cyprus, following the 2016 legislative election.

== List of voting members ==
Constituency	Name	Born	Party	# of preferential votes
Famagusta	Yiannakis Gavriel	17 July 1961 (age 64)	Progressive Party of Working People	4,837
Famagusta	Georgios Georgiou (Cypriot politician, 1957)	9 October 1957 (age 68)	Democratic Rally	6,858
Famagusta	Michalis Giorgallas	20 March 1968 (age 58)	Solidarity Movement	1,062
Famagusta	Kyriacos Hadjiyianni	22 August 1963 (age 62)	Democratic Rally	11,136
Famagusta	Giorgos Karoullas	28 June 1972 (age 53)	Democratic Rally	7,180
Famagusta	Nikos Kettiros	25 August 1974 (age 51)	Progressive Party of Working People	5,698
Famagusta	Skevi Koukouma (Koutra)	18 July 1954 (age 71)	Progressive Party of Working People	6,047
Famagusta	Zacharias Koulias	7 December 1950 (age 75)	Democratic Party	2,622
Famagusta	Onoufrios Koulla	19 December 1974 (age 51)	Democratic Rally	6,866
Famagusta	Linos Papagiannis	27 June 1988 (age 37)	ELAM	1,313
Famagusta	Anna Theologou	12 March 1986 (age 40)	Generation Change	1,009
Kyrenia	Mariella Aristidou	2 February 1985 (age 41)	Democratic Rally	1,354
Kyrenia	Marios Mavrides	5 August 1963 (age 62)	Democratic Rally	2,744
Kyrenia	Eleni Mavrou	2 February 1961 (age 65)	Progressive Party of Working People	1,846
Larnaca	Annita Demetriou	18 October 1985 (age 40)	Democratic Rally	4,006
Larnaca	Christos Orphanides	14 June 1961 (age 64)	Democratic Party	1,668
Larnaca	Andreas Pashourtides	25 November 1984 (age 41)	Progressive Party of Working People	2,386
Larnaca	George Prokopiou	22 October 1956 (age 69)	Coalition of Democratic Forces	2,770
Larnaca	Evanthia Savva	17 October 1964 (age 61)	Progressive Party of Working People	2,656
Larnaca	Zacharias Zachariou	13 December 1963 (age 62)	Democratic Rally	2,850
Limassol	Adamos Adamou	13 October 1950 (age 75)	Progressive Party of Working People	5,397
Limassol	Costas Costa	26 March 1971 (age 55)	Progressive Party of Working People	6,395
Limassol	Efthimios Diplaros	18 March 1980 (age 46)	Democratic Rally	9,105
Limassol	Giorgos T. Georgiou	26 June 1961 (age 64)	Progressive Party of Working People	3,776
Limassol	Andros Kafkalias	21 October 1971 (age 54)	Progressive Party of Working People	6,447
Limassol	Andreas Kyprianou	30 April 1962 (age 64)	Democratic Rally	4,749
Limassol	Panikos Leonidou	15 October 1959 (age 66)	Democratic Party	4,562
Limassol	Pavlos Milonas	1 March 1967 (age 59)	Democratic Party	3,651
Limassol	Marinos Sizopoulos	17 July 1957 (age 68)	Movement for Social Democracy	Party Leader
Limassol	Eleni Stavrou	4 July 1975 (age 50)	Democratic Rally	5,205
Limassol	Angelos Votsis	1 October 1963 (age 62)	Coalition of Democratic Forces	3,320
Nicosia	Irene Charalambidou	19 April 1964 (age 62)	Progressive Party of Working People	16,847
Nicosia	Christos Christou	19 October 1980 (age 45)	ELAM	Party Leader
Nicosia	Aristos Damianou	3 June 1972 (age 54)	Progressive Party of Working People	12,985
Nicosia	Demetris Demetriou	4 May 1981 (age 45)	Democratic Rally	9,953
Nicosia	Kostis Efstathiou	13 June 1961 (age 64)	Movement for Social Democracy	2,984
Nicosia	Christiana Erotokritou	14 May 1973 (age 53)	Democratic Party	7,222
Nicosia	Xenia Konstantinou	25 February 1979 (age 47)	Democratic Rally	7,864
Nicosia	Andros Kyprianou	26 October 1955 (age 70)	Progressive Party of Working People	Party Leader
Nicosia	Giorgos Lillikas	1 June 1960 (age 66)	Citizens' Alliance	Party Leader
Nicosia	George Loukaides	5 December 1968 (age 57)	Progressive Party of Working People	11,125
Nicosia	Marinos Mousiouttas	25 February 1964 (age 62)	Coalition of Democratic Forces	5,594
Nicosia	Averof Neofytou	31 July 1961 (age 64)	Democratic Rally	Party Leader
Nicosia	Savia Orphanidou	18 August 1979 (age 46)	Democratic Rally	7,916
Nicosia	Nikolas Papadopoulos	22 April 1973 (age 53)	Democratic Party	Party Leader
Nicosia	George Perdikes	23 March 1962 (age 64)	Movement of Ecologists - Citizens' Cooperation	4,426
Nicosia	Michalis Sofocleous	9 June 1972 (age 54)	Democratic Rally	8,842
Nicosia	Stefanos Stefanou	21 January 1965 (age 61)	Progressive Party of Working People	13,139
Nicosia	Roula Georgiadou	25 August 1958 (age 67)	Solidarity Movement	904
Nicosia	Charalambos Theopemptou	26 November 1955 (age 70)	Movement of Ecologists - Citizens' Cooperation	3,665
Nicosia	Nicos Tornaritis	6 December 1964 (age 61)	Democratic Rally	10,534
Paphos	Costas Constantinou	14 March 1958 (age 68)	Democratic Rally	3,505
Paphos	Andreas Fakontis	22 October 1964 (age 61)	Progressive Party of Working People	2,566
Paphos	Elias Mirianthis	5 May 1967 (age 59)	Movement for Social Democracy	1,916
Paphos	Charalambos Pittokopitis	6 December 1955 (age 70)	Democratic Party	2,783

== Sources ==
- Biographical notes – Parliament of Cyprus
