= Pambos =

Pambos is a Cypriot masculine given name which may refer to:

- Pambos Christodoulou (born 1967), Cypriot football manager
- Pambos Christofi (born 1968), Cypriot retired footballer
- Pamboullis Papadopoulos (born 1947), Cypriot retired footballer
- Pambos Papageorgiou (born 1963), Cypriot politician
- Pambos Pittas (born 1966), Cypriot retired footballer

== See also ==
- Pambo (305–c. 375), Catholic and Eastern Orthodox saint
- Vuyani Pambo, 21st century South African politician
