= Stefanos Stefanou =

Cypriot politician

Stefanos Stephanou
- Στέφανος Στεφάνου
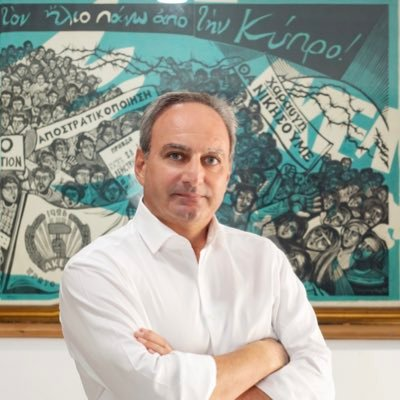
- Stefanou in 2026

6th General Secretary of the Progressive Party of Working People
- Incumbent
- Assumed office 4 July 2021
- Preceded by: Andros Kyprianou

Member of the Cypriot House of Representatives
- Incumbent
- Assumed office 2 June 2016
- Constituency: Nicosia

Spokesperson of the Government
- In office 3 March 2008 – 28 February 2013
- Preceded by: Vasilis Palmas
- Succeeded by: Christos Stylianides

Personal details
- Born: 21 January 1965 (age 61) Gerolakkos, Cyprus
- Citizenship: Cyprus
- Party: AKEL
- Spouse: Georgia Zenonos
- Children: 2
- Education: Social Sciences
- Profession: AKEL Secretary General
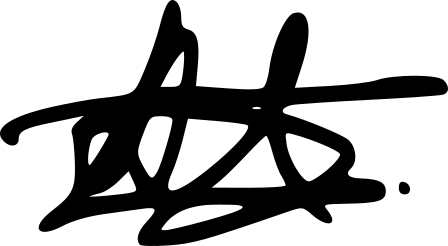
- Signature

Stefanos Stephanou (Greek: Στέφανος Στεφάνου; born 21 January 1965) is a Cypriot politician who is the General Secretary of the Progressive Party of Working People (AKEL) since 2021 and serves as a member of the Cypriot House of Representatives since 2016. He represents the Nicosia District.

== Biography ==
Stefanos Stefanou was born in Gerolakkos on 21 January 1965. Following the Turkish invasion of Cyprus in 1974 he moved to Deftera, his father's birthplace. He studied political science at the Academy of Social and Political Science in Sofia, Bulgaria. He is married to Georgia Zenonos with whom he has two daughters.

== Political career ==
During his studies he was the president of the Organisation of Cypriot Students in Bulgaria. Following the completion of his studies in 1989, he worked for the United Democratic Youth Organisation (EDON). Since 1995 onwards, he has been a member of AKEL's Central Committee. During the period 1996-2001, he was EDON's General Secretary. During the period 2001-2008 he was a Special Adviser to the President of the House of Representatives, Demetris Christofias. In 2008-2013 he was the Government Spokesperson under Demetris Christofia's administration. Since 2011 he has been a member of AKEL's Political Bureau. Since 2016 he has been AKEL's Central Committee's Spokesperson and AKEL's Head of the Press and Communication Office.

During the 2016 parliamentary election, he was elected as a representative of the Nicosia Electoral District under AKEL for the 2016 Legislative Session. He was re-elected in the 2021 parliamentary election for the 2021 Legislative Session.

As a representative, he is a:

- Member of the Committee of Selection;
- Deputy Chairman of the House Standing Committee on Refugees-Enclaved-Missing-Adversely Affected Persons;
- Member of the House Standing Committee on Development Plans and Public Expenditure Control;
- Member of the House Standing Committee on Financial and Budgetary Affairs and of the Ad Hoc House Committee on the Investigation of Issues Relating to Loans of Politically Exposed Persons, and;
- The Head of the delegation of the House to the Parliamentary Assembly of the Mediterranean (PAM).

At the 23rd Party Congress, held on 4 July 2021, he was elected General Secretary of the party's Central Committee, securing 74 votes or 71.84% against 29 votes or 28.16% obtained by fellow candidate Yiorgos Loukaides.
