= Ezekias Papaioannou =

Greek Cypriot communist politician (1908–1988)

- Eζεκίας Παπαϊωάννου

3rd General Secretary of the Progressive Party of Working People
- In office 1949–1988
- Preceded by: Fifis Ioannou
- Succeeded by: Dimitris Christofias

Personal details
- Born: October 8, 1908 Kellaki, Cyprus
- Died: April 10, 1988 (aged 79) Cyprus
- Party: Progressive Party of Working People
- Spouses: Adeline Williams (m. 1940; div. 1946); Irene Markoulli

Military service
- Allegiance: Second Spanish Republic; United Kingdom
- Battles/wars: Spanish Civil War; Second World War

Ezekias Papaioannou (Greek: Εζεκίας Παπαϊωάννου; 8 October 1908 – 10 April 1988) was a Greek Cypriot communist politician and secretary general of AKEL.

He was born in the village of Kellaki, Limassol District, and received his secondary education at the American Academy of Larnaca with financial help from his brother. In his last year of school, because of health reasons, he moved to Nicosia where he finished his studies at The English School, Nicosia. He then worked as a miner in Skouriotissa (Foukasa) and as a manual worker in Piraeus port.

He moved to London in the early 1930s, where he actively worked with the Communist Party of Great Britain against different fascist factions. During this time he was arrested and jailed for three months by the British authorities. During his time in Britain he became a founding member of the Association of Cypriot Affairs which sought the expulsion of the British from Cyprus.

In 1936, he was part of a contingent of 60 Cypriot leftists who volunteered to fight in the Spanish Civil War as part of the International Brigades. 15 of them died and Ezekias was injured and had to return to London. Cyprus had the biggest percentage of volunteers and dead per capita of any country fighting against Francisco Franco.

After the war, he lived in London and worked as a milkman.

With the start of World War II Ezekias tried to enlist, but was refused because of his old injuries and poor health. Not able to remain idle, he joined London's air defence where he served until the end of the war. In 1945 he was asked by AKEL to return to Cyprus where he remained until the end of his life.

After his return, he immediately got involved in local politics and in 1946 he became editor-in-chief of the newspaper Democratis and in 1949 3rd general secretary of the Progressive Party of Working People (AKEL), a position he held for 40 years until his death.

During the next few years he worked endlessly along with his party for the rights of workers and against British colonialism. The party was declared illegal by the British authorities in 1955 and Ezekias together with another 134 members were arrested and jailed. Soon, he escaped and continued the fight until Independence in 1959.

Ezekias was against the Zürich and London Agreement, claiming it was unworkable. He worked for the next two decades to prevent all tactics of the extreme right wing elements of the island and to foster better relations with the Turkish Cypriots.

In 1960, following the independence of Cyprus from the British Empire, he was elected to parliament. Papaioannou was repeatedly re-elected and served as a member of Parliament for 28 consecutive years up until his death in 1988.

In his will, he left all his assets to his party.
