= Fifis Ioannou =

Cypriot politician and editor

2nd General Secretary of the Progressive Party of Working People
- In office 1945–1949
- Preceded by: Ploutis Servas
- Succeeded by: Ezekias Papaioannou

Personal details
- Born: 23 October 1914 Nicosia, Cyprus
- Died: October 1988
- Party: Progressive Party of Working People

Fifis Ioannou (Φιφής Ιωάννου in Greek; 23 October 1914 – October 1988) was a Cypriot politician and editor.

Ioannou was born in Nicosia, Cyprus in 1914. He succeeded Ploutis Servas in 1945 as the Secretary General of AKEL, a position he held until 1949.

He was the head editor of various Cypriot newspapers and president of the Union of Cyprus Journalists from 1973 to 1979.
