= Dinos Hadjinicolas =

Cypriot politician (1955–2022)

Ntinos Hadjinicolas

Member of the House of Representatives of Cyprus
- In office 6 March 2003 – 1 June 2011
- Constituency: Limassol constituency

Personal details
- Born: 13 May 1955 Kellaki, British Cyprus
- Died: 11 January 2022 (aged 66)
- Party: ΑΚΕΛ
- Education: University of Macerata

Ntinos Hadjinicolas (Greek: Ντίνος Χατζηνικόλας; 13 May 1955 – 11 January 2022) was a Cypriot politician. A member of the Progressive Party of Working People, he served in the House of Representatives from 2003 to 2011. He died on 11 January 2022, at the age of 66.
