= Evanthia Savva =

Cypriot politician (born 1964)

- Ευανθία Σάββα

Deputy Mayor of Aradippou
- Incumbent
- Assumed office May 2024

House of Representatives
- In office June 2016 – 2021

Aradippou Municipal Councillor
- In office 2006–2016

Personal details
- Born: 17 October 1964 (age 61)
- Party: AKEL
- Occupation: Politician, lawyer

Evanthia Savva (Greek: Ευανθία Σάββα; born 17 October 1964) is a Cypriot lawyer and politician who served as a member of the House of Representatives of Cyprus from 2016 to 2021. She represented the Larnaca constituency as a member of the Progressive Party of Working People (AKEL).

== Early life and career ==
Savva was raised in Aradippou, Larnaca District, Cyprus. She studied law at the Democritus University of Thrace in Komotini, Greece. Prior to entering politics, she worked as a lawyer.

== Political career ==
=== Aradippou Municipal Councillor (2006–2016) ===
From 2006 to May 2016, Savva served as a municipal councillor of Aradippou. From 2006 to 2011, she was also a member of the Aradippou school committee. In 2011, she became a member of the municipal branch of AKEL.

=== House of Representatives (2016–2021) ===
Savva was elected to the House of Representatives in the 2016 legislative election. She was one of two AKEL members elected to represent the Larnaca constituency. During her tenure, she was a member of the House Standing Committee on the Environment, as well as those on human rights, internal affairs, and legal affairs. She was also a member of the Cypriot delegation to the Interparliamentary Assembly on Orthodoxy.

Savva is head of the AKEL social policy department and a member of the Central Committee. In March 2024, Savva was part of the party delegation to China.

=== Deputy Mayor of Aradippou (2024–present) ===
In June 2024, Savva was elected Deputy Mayor of Aradippou.

== Personal life ==
Savva is married to Savvakis Savva. She has one son and two daughters.
