= Ploutis Servas =

Cypriot politician (1907–2001)

Ploutarchos Servas

1st General Secretary of the Progressive Party of Working People
- In office 1935–1945
- Succeeded by: Fifis Ioannou

Personal details
- Born: 22 May 1907 Limassol, British Cyprus
- Died: 14 February 2001 (aged 93)
- Party: Progressive Party of Working People

inscription placed on Servas's house by the municipality of Limassol

Ploutis Servas (Πλουτής Σέρβας in Greek; 22 May 1907 – 14 February 2001), was a Cypriot former politician, reporter, and author. Servas was born Ploutarhos Loizou Savvidis (Πλούταρχος Λοΐζου Σαββίδης) and changed his surname to Servas while still a student in secondary education.

Servas was born in Limassol in 1907. In 1929–1934, he studied political and social sciences at the Communist University of the National Minorities of the West in Moscow. He returned to Cyprus in the 1930s and had to sign a declaration saying he would not be involved in politics in order to be allowed to set foot in the country. He became a member of the Secretariat of the illegal Communist Party of Cyprus (CPC) and founder and first general secretary of AKEL (1941–1945). He was also the first elected Mayor of Limassol, serving two terms (1943–1946 and 1946–1949). In May 2002 a commemorative bust was unveiled by the city in his honor. As mayor he participated in the consultative assembly and advocated accepting the British plan of self-government for Cyprus in 1948. For that opinion he became isolated within his party and was expelled in 1952.

He supported Ioannis Clerides in the 1960 elections, but wasn't an active politician again himself. He worked mainly as a reporter and a writer. He wrote multiple books on political issues.

His death on 14 February 2001 caused controversy in Cyprus, as in his will he had asked to be cremated. There were no crematoria in Cyprus and there was a heated debate between those supporting the availability of cremation as an alternative and those (mainly religious Orthodox Christians) who disapproved of it.

== Publications ==
- Spain on Fire (1936)
- The Labour Issue (1936)
- AKEL and Local Issues (1942)
- Portraits of Palmer's Era (1946)
- Korea (1949)
- Prague Spring (1973)
- How Did We Manage to Get to Zero; The Cypriot Tragedy (1975)
- Old and New China (1977)
- Responsibilities (first volume 1980, second volume 1984, third volume 1985).
