= Pambos Christofi =

Cypriot footballer (born 1968)

Personal information
- Full name: Charalambos Christofi
- Date of birth: 10 May 1968 (age 58)
- Position: Midfielder

Senior career*
Years	Team	Apps	(Gls)
1989–1997	Apollon Limassol FC		

International career
1991–1993	Cyprus	6	(0)
- * Club domestic league appearances and goals

Pambos Christofi (born 10 May 1968) is a retired Cypriot football midfielder.
