= Christos Stylianides =

Greek Cypriot politician

- Χρήστος Στυλιανίδης
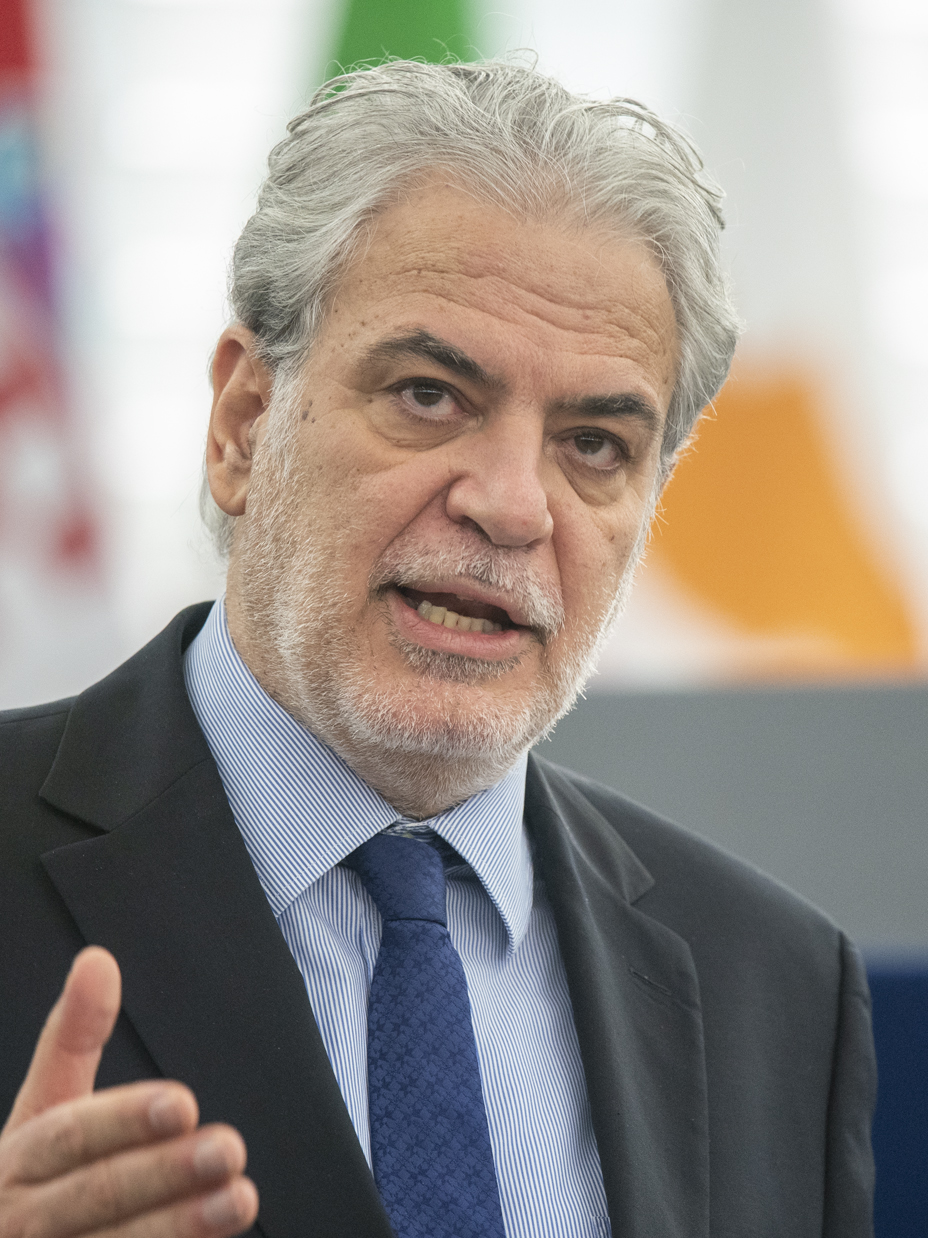
- Stylianides in 2019

Minister of Maritime Affairs and Insular Policy
- Incumbent
- Assumed office 12 September 2023
- Prime Minister: Kyriakos Mitsotakis
- Preceded by: Ioannis Varvitsiotis

Minister of the Climate Crisis and Civil Protection
- In office 10 September 2021 – 25 May 2023
- Prime Minister: Kyriakos Mitsotakis
- Preceded by: Nikos Hardalias (Note: (as Deputy Minister for Civil Protection and Crisis Management))
- Succeeded by: Evangelos Tournas

European Commissioner for Humanitarian Aid and Crisis Management
- In office 1 November 2014 – 1 December 2019
- Commission: Juncker
- Preceded by: Kristalina Georgieva (Note: (as International Cooperation, Humanitarian Aid and Crisis Response))
- Succeeded by: Janez Lenarčič (Note: (as Crisis Management))

Spokesperson of the Government
- In office 28 February 2013 – 14 April 2014
- Preceded by: Stefanos Stefanou
- Succeeded by: Nikos Christodoulides

Personal details
- Born: 26 June 1958 (age 67) Nicosia, British Cyprus
- Party: Democratic Rally; European People's Party
- Education: University of Thessaloniki

Christos Stylianides (Note: Greek Cypriot Latin spelling) or Christos Stylianidis (Note: Helladite Latin spelling) (Greek: Χρήστος Στυλιανίδης, romanized: Christos Stylianidis, born 26 June 1958) is a Greek Cypriot politician serving as Minister of Maritime Affairs and Insular Policy of Greece since 2023. From September 2021 to May 2023 he served as Greece's first Minister for Climate Crisis and Civil Protection. On June 26 he was elected Member of the Hellenic Parliament with the governing New Democracy Party (ND). He has previously served as the European Commissioner for Humanitarian Aid and Crisis Management (Cyprus) from 2014 until 2019. In 2014, he was also appointed by the European Council as the European Union's Ebola Coordinator. He was also elected as a Member of the European Parliament in the May 2014 European elections where he served until 31 October 2014.

In May 2021, he was appointed as the European Commission's Special Envoy for the promotion of freedom of religion or belief outside the EU a position he served until he became Minister for Climate Crisis Management and Civil Protection of Greece (September 2021).

Stylianides previously served as Government Spokesperson (1998–1999 and 2013–2014) and was member of the Parliament of the Republic of Cyprus from 2006 to 2013. As an MEP, served as member of the Committee on Budgets and substitute Member of the Committee on Industry, Research and Energy. He was also a member of the Delegation for relations with the US and Substitute Member of the Delegation for relations with Israel.

He was elected to the Hellenic Parliament in the June 2023 Greek legislative election.

== Early life and career ==
Stylianides was born and raised in Nicosia, the son of a shopkeeper. In 1984, he received his degree as dental surgeon from Aristotelian University in Thessaloniki, Greece. He later received executive education in International Development at the John F. Kennedy School of Government at Harvard University. Postgraduate seminars in political science, international relations and European Institutions followed.

== Political career ==
=== Government Spokesperson of the Republic of Cyprus, 1998-1999 ===
Under President Glafcos Clerides, Stylianides served as senior member of Government. Member of the President's delegation to EU accession talks and intercommunal negotiations for Cyprus's reunification. Resigned in 1999, in protest over a political corruption case which involved the public administration.

=== Member of the Cyprus House of Representatives, 2006–2013 ===
(Elected in 2006 and 2011 with Democratic Rally/DISY). Vice-Chair of the Committee on Foreign and European Affairs (2011–2013). Member of the Committee on European Affairs, the Committee of Internal Affairs and the Committee of Employment and Social Affairs (2006–2011). DISY co-ordinator for the Committees of European Affairs, Internal Affairs and Employment and Social Affairs.

Between 2006 and 2013, Stylianides also served as member of the OSCE Parliamentary Assembly (2006–2011). He was elected Member of the Bureau of the OSCE Parliamentary Assembly in 2012. Member of the OSCE PA Election Observation Missions. Represented Cyprus at plenary sessions and committee meetings of the Union for the Mediterranean Parliamentary Assembly.

=== Government Spokesperson of the Republic of Cyprus, 2013–2014 ===
In the government of Nicos Anastasiades, Stylianides served as senior political official in the Executive branch, managing the Government's communication strategy and heading the Government's centralised Press and Information Office. He participated in the proceedings of the Council of Ministers and the meetings of the National Council of Cyprus. Also, he accompanied President Nicos Anastasiades as a member of his delegation, to all EU and UN high-level meetings. He stepped down in April 2014 to run as candidate in the May European Parliament elections.

=== European Commissioner for Humanitarian Aid and Crisis Management, 2014–2019 ===
In October 2014, European Union leaders agreed to appoint Stylianides as the bloc's point person on the Ebola virus epidemic in West Africa, as it sought to step up its response to the spread of the virus. He later impressed many lawmakers at his parliamentary hearing as nominee for the post of European Commissioner for Humanitarian Aid and Crisis Management in the Juncker Commission.

== Later career ==
Since July 2020, Stylianides has been serving as a special advisor on education in emergencies, migration and inclusion to Vice-President of the European Commission Margaritis Schinas. In May 2021, he was appointed as the European Commission's Special Envoy for the promotion of freedom of religion or belief outside the EU.

== Political positions ==
Considered a "hardcore Europeanist", Stylianides advocated Cyprus's accession to the European Union as far back as the mid-1990s, when he co-founded the Movement for Political Modernisation and Reform, despite the initial scepticism of many on the political scene.

Although Stylianides is widely regarded a liberal by inclination, his political career has always been with the centre-right Democratic Rally party, DISY, on the grounds that it takes a more conciliatory approach to reuniting Cyprus. He supported the controversial United Nations-brokered blueprint for Cyprus known as the Annan plan, which called for an end to the island's division and for reunification of its two feuding communities in a bi-zonal, bi-communal federation – in a referendum in 2004, the plan was accepted by a majority of Turkish Cypriots but overwhelmingly rejected by Stylianides's fellow Greeks Cypriots.

== Other activities ==
Council Member of the European Council on Foreign Relations (ECFR).

Co-founded the Movement for Political Modernization and Reform (1995), promoting Cyprus's EU Accession and State & political reform.

Leading member of grassroots youth movements in support of EU membership and the solution of the Cyprus problem since the early 1980s.

Actively involved in the rapprochement between the Greek Cypriot and the Turkish Cypriot communities through joint civil society and political initiatives.

== Notes ==
Political offices
Preceded by Androulla Vassiliou	Cypriot European Commissioner; 2014–2019	Succeeded by Stella Kyriakidou
Preceded by Kristalina Georgieva as European Commissioner for International Cooperation, Humanitarian Aid and Crisis Response	European Commissioner for Humanitarian Aid and Crisis Management; 2014–2019	Incumbent
