= Roula Mavronicola =

Roula Mavronicola (Greek: Ρούλα Μαυρονικόλα; born 1957) is a Cypriot politician. As a member of the EDEK Socialist Party, she represented Nicosia in the House of Representatives from 2006 to 2016.

She is the longtime president of the Socialist Women's Movement of Cyprus.

== Early life and education ==
Roula Mavronicola was born in Karavas in 1957. She speaks English in addition to Greek.

She attended the National and Kapodistrian University of Athens, where she studied English literature.

== Career ==
Mavronicola became engaged with politics through her work as a trade unionist.

As a young woman, she was a founding member of the student party AGONAS (the Democratic Movement of Cypriot Students). Then, she became involved with the youth wing of the EDEK Socialist Party from 1981 to 1990. After that, from 1990 to 1999, she worked on EDEK's district committee for Nicosia and Kyrenia. Having served on the party's Central Committee in that decade, in 1999 she joined its Political Bureau.

Since 1998, she has served as president of the Socialist Women's Movement of Cyprus. She also served on the board of the Cyprus Gender Equality Observatory beginning in 2005.

In the 2006 Cypriot legislative election, Mavronicola was elected as an EDEK member to represent Nicosia in the House of Representatives. She was re-elected in 2011 and served out her second term through 2016. However, she was not able to run again due to internal party rules against seeking a third term.

While in the legislature, she served on the Parliamentary Committee on Human Rights and Equal Opportunities Between Men and Women, the Parliamentary Committee on Labor and Social Security, the Parliamentary Committee on Monitoring Development Plans and Public Expenditure Control, the Parliamentary Committee on the Environment, and the Parliamentary Committee on Health. She focused her efforts on issues of human rights, equality, labor, and health, against the backdrop of the Greek government-debt crisis. She also represented Cyprus in the Parliamentary Assembly of the Mediterranean.

At the Democratic Labour Federation of Cyprus's 18th Congress, Mavronicola was honored for her contributions to the labor movement.

== Personal life ==
Mavronicola is married to fellow politician Kyriakos Mavronikolas, whom she met through her work with the AGONAS youth party. The couple has two sons.
