= Yiannakis Gavriel =

Cypriot politician

- Γιαννάκης Γαβριήλ

Member of Parliament House of Representatives (Famagusta District)
- In office March 6, 2008 – June 1, 2016

Member of Parliament House of Representatives (Famagusta District)
- In office October 23, 2020 – present

Personal details
- Born: July 17, 1961 (age 64); Deryneia, Cyprus
- Political party: Progressive Party of Working People
- Spouse: Chrystalla Ioannou
- Children: 2
- Education: Educator

Yiannakis Gavriel (born July 17, 1961, in Deryneia, Famagusta) is a Greek Cypriot politician. He is a member of the House of Representatives representing the Famagusta District, elected with the AKEL party.

== Biography ==
Yiannakis Gavriel was born in Deryneia on July 17, 1961. He speaks Greek, English, and Hungarian. He studied industrial engineering and wood processing at the University of Forestry and Wood Sciences in Sopron, Hungary. He works as an educator.

He is married to Chrystalla Ioannou and has one son and one daughter.

=== Political career ===
He served as the secretary of the United Democratic Youth Organization (EDON) of Deryneia from 1989 to 1993. He was a member of the board of the Drug and Addict Information and Treatment Center (KENTHEA) from 2004 to 2008. He has also been a member of the Association of Scientific Engineers and the Scientific Technical Chamber of Cyprus since 1990. He has been a member of the Famagusta District Committee of AKEL since 2008 and a member of the Central Committee of AKEL since 2010.

He participated in the 2006 parliamentary elections in the Famagusta District with AKEL but was not elected. However, in 2008, the AKEL Member of Parliament for Famagusta District, Costas Papacostas, was appointed Ministry of Defense in the Demetris Christofias government. As the first alternate, Yiannakis Gavriel took his place in parliament on March 6, 2008, for the 9th Parliamentary Session (Cyprus). He was re-elected in the 2011 parliamentary elections for the 10th Parliamentary Session (Cyprus).

As a member of parliament, he served as Chairman of the Parliamentary Committee on Agriculture and Natural Resources and a member of the Parliamentary Committee on Commerce and Industry.

He ran for re-election in the 2016 parliamentary elections but was not elected. However, following the resignation of the AKEL MP for the Famagusta District, Christakis Tziovanis, Yiannakis Gavriel took his place on October 23, 2020, as the first alternate, for the 11th Parliamentary Session (Cyprus). He was re-elected in the 2021 parliamentary elections for the 12th Parliamentary Session (Cyprus).

== Sources ==
- "GAVRIEL Yiannakis". www.parliament.cy. House of Representatives. Archived from the original on 2021-04-27.
- "Gavriel Yiannakis". House of Representatives. Archived from the original on 2019-07-09.
