= Mariella Aristidou =

Cypriot politician (born 1985)

- Μαριέλλα Αριστείδου

Member of the House of Representatives of Cyprus
- In office May 2016 – May 2021
- Constituency: Kyrenia

Personal details
- Born: 2 February 1985 (age 41) Limassol, Cyprus
- Party: DISY
- Education: National and Kapodistrian University of Athens
- Occupation: Politician

Mariella Aristidou (Greek: Μαριέλλα Αριστείδου; born 2 February 1985) is a Cypriot politician. She served as a member of the House of Representatives from 2016 to 2021, representing the Kyrenia constituency for the Democratic Rally (DISY). She also served as a municipal councillor of Limassol from 2011 to 2016.

== Early life and education ==
Aristidou was born in Limassol, Cyprus. She studied French literature at the National and Kapodistrian University of Athens.

== Political career ==
In 2011, Aristidou was elected to the Limassol Municipal Council; she served in the role until May 2016. She was elected to the House of Representatives in the 2016 legislative election, becoming one of two DISY MPs to represent the Kyrenia constituency, and one of eleven women in parliament. During her tenure, she served as chair of the House Standing Committee on Human Rights and on Equal Opportunities for Men and Women, and as a member of the Committee on Labour, Welfare and Social Insurance and the Committee on Refugees-Enclaved-Missing-Adversely Affected Persons.

In May 2020, Aristidou voiced her support for mandatory sex education in order to protect children from exploitation and abuse.

== Personal life ==
Aristidou is married to Nicolas Papayiannis; she has one son.
