= Nicos Katsourides =

Cypriot politician (born 1951)

MP of AKEL
- In office 1991–2016
- Constituency: Nicosia

Personal details
- Born: 14 December 1951 (age 73); Nicosia, Cyprus
- Political party: AKEL
- Spouse: Androula Philippou
- Children: Two sons

Nicos Katsourides (Greek: Νίκος Κατσουρίδης; born 14 December 1951) is a Cypriot politician. He studied Economics (PhD in Bulgaria) in the field of Planning and Administration of the National Economy. He speaks Greek, English and Bulgarian. Katsourides has been a member of Cypriot parliament since 1991 for the constituency of Nicosia under the banner of AKEL and a parliamentary spokesman for his party since 2003. He was a member of the Political Bureau of the Central Committee of AKEL until December 2013 and head of the party's Committee for the Study of the Cyprus Problem until January 2014. He was also a member of the National Council, the supreme advisory body to the President of the Republic for the Cyprus problem, until January 2014.
