= George Prokopiou =

Greek ship owner

- Born: June 8, 1946 (age 80); Athens, Greece
- Education: National Technical University of Athens
- Occupations: Founder & Owner of Dynagas Lng Partners Lp; Owner of Dynacom Tankers
- Spouse: Alexandra Prokopiou
- Children: 4 daughters

George J. Prokopiou (born 1946) is a billionaire Greek shipowner, founder of Dynacom Tankers, Sea Traders and Dynagas.

== Early life ==
George J. Prokopiou was born in Athens in 1946. He holds a Civil Engineering degree from the National Technical University of Athens.

== Career ==
Prokopiou bought his first ship in 1971, a 55,000-tonne tanker, Pennsylvania. He is the founder of Dynacom Tankers (established in 1991), Sea Traders and Dynagas. In February 2025, the Dynacom Tankers fleet encompassed 64 vessels, the Sea Traders company had a fleet of 5 bulk carriers and Dynagas had a fleet of 21 LNG carriers. In total his current fleet stands at 91 vessels. George Prokopiou is overseeing a newbuilding program for 88 vessels.

In February 2025 he acquired the entire share capital of the Astir Palace Vouliagmeni hotel group.

In March 2015, he had a net worth of $2 billion, and a fleet of 89 ships, according to Bloomberg.

In 2023 he acquired the Skaramangas Shipyards.

In 2025, Lloyd's List named him number 14 in their list of the Top 100 most influential people in the shipping industry. Prokopiou also appeared in the Top 100 in 2012, 2013, 2014, 2015, 2016, 2017, 2020, 2021 and 2024.

Forbes estimated Prokopiou net worth at $3.7 billion in 2024 listed at #1046 globally.

In November 2026, the Swiss publication Gstaad Confidential identified Procopiou as the possible buyer of the Park Gstaad hotel in Switzerland and estimated the sale price at between 350 million and 400 million Swiss francs.

== Personal life ==
He is married to Alexandra. They have four daughters. As of 2014, Eliza, the eldest works for her father's companies, as does her husband Nick Chrissakis. Ioanna works for her father in dry cargo, and her husband, John Kairis also works in shipping, running Kairis Brothers. Marina works on tanker projects and long-term business, and her husband Tony Lauritzen is CEO of Dynagas LNG Partners. The youngest, Maria-Elena, is the founder and owner of shipping firm, Delos Navigation.
