= United Democratic Youth Organisation (Cyprus) =

Communist youth organization in Cyprus

United Democratic Youth Organisation Ενιαία Δημοκρατική Οργάνωση Νεολαίας
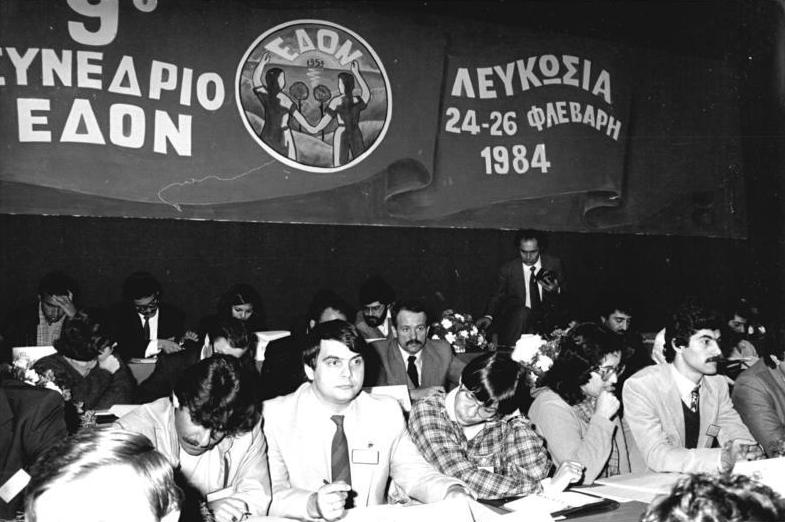
- EDON's ninth conference, March 1984
- Chairperson: Seviros Koulas
- Founded: 1959; 67 years ago
- Headquarters: Andrea Papacosta 1, Kaimakli, Nicosia, Cyprus
- Mother party: Progressive Party of Working People (AKEL)
- International affiliation: World Federation of Democratic Youth (WFDY)
- Newspaper: Neolaia
- Website: www.edon.org.cy

The United Democratic Youth Organisation (Greek: Ενιαία Δημοκρατική Οργάνωση Νεολαίας), commonly referred to by its transliterated initials EDON, is the youth wing of the Progressive Party of Working People (transliterated initials AKEL), a Marxist-Leninist political party in Cyprus. Founded in 1959, it is one of the two main parties in Cyprus and is in opposition to NEDISY, the youth wing of the liberal-conservative Democratic Rally party.

== Political beliefs ==
The organization supports a federal solution to the Cyprus dispute. It responded negatively to the Annan Plan and supports rapprochement with the Turkish Cypriots. It is a member of the World Federation of Democratic Youth.

== Participation in events ==
The organization takes part in events organised by AKEL and annually demonstrates on the days around 15 and 20 of July to commemorate its opposition to the 1974 Cypriot coup d'état and the Turkish invasion of Cyprus. It takes part in the main conferences of AKEL, which are held every five years and are attended by thousands of supporters. It also organizes its own conferences.

In June 2020, as part of the worldwide protests against racist police brutality in the United States, around 250 EDON members demonstrated peacefully outside the U.S. embassy in Nicosia.
