= Efthimios Diplaros =

Cypriot politician

- Ευθύμιος Δίπλαρος

Deputy President of the Democratic Rally
- Incumbent
- Assumed office 6 May 2023
- Preceded by: Harris Georgiades

Member of the Cypriot House of Representatives
- Incumbent
- Assumed office 2 June 2011 – 14 June 2026
- Constituency: Limassol

Personal details
- Born: 18 March 1980 (age 46) Limassol, Cyprus
- Party: Democratic Rally

Efthimios Diplaros (Greek: Ευθύμιος Δίπλαρος; born March 18, 1980) is a Greek Cypriot politician, who has served as the Deputy President of the Democratic Rally since May 2023. He has been a member of parliament for the Limassol Electoral District since 2011.

== Biography ==
He studied communication and mass media at the Professional Training Institute DELTA in Thessaloniki. Before becoming an MP he worked as a journalist.

He is married to Argyro Rotsidou and has three sons and one daughter.

== Political career ==
During the period of 2001–2003, he was a member of the Youth Council of the Democratic Rally (NEDISY). Since 2003, he has been a member of the Limassol District Council of DISY and a member of the Supreme Council of DISY.

In the 2006 municipal elections, he was elected as a municipal councillor in the Municipality of Limassol with DISY.

In the 2011 legislative election, he was elected as a member of parliament in the Limassol Electoral District with DISY. He was re-elected in the 2016 and in 2021.

As an MP, he serves as the deputy parliamentary spokesperson of DISY, a member of the Selection Committee, and a member of the Parliamentary Committee on Agriculture and Natural Resources and the Parliamentary Committee on Transport, Communications, and Works.

In February 2020, he was elected vice-president of DISY, and on May 6, 2023, he was elected deputy president of the party.
