= Giorgos Georgiou (Cypriot politician) =

Cypriot politician

Giorgos Georgiou MEP
- Γιώργος Γεωργίου
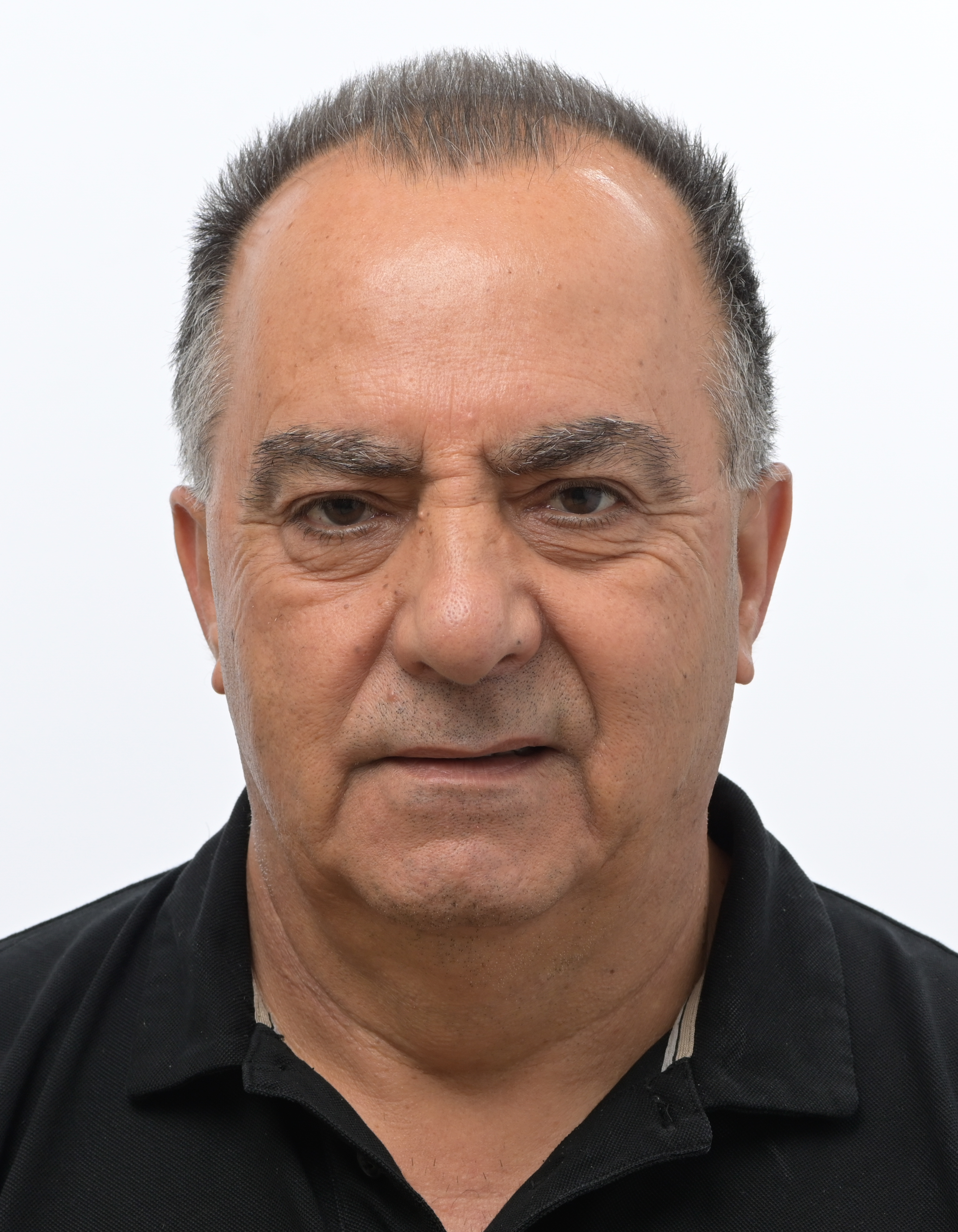
- Official portrait, 2024

Member of the European Parliament for Cyprus
- Incumbent
- Assumed office 2 July 2019

Personal details
- Born: April 9, 1963 (age 63)
- Party: Cyprus: AKEL (European Union) EU: GUE-NGL

Giorgos Georgiou (born 9 April 1963) is a Cypriot politician currently serving as a Member of the European Parliament for the Progressive Party of Working People.

== Career ==
Georgiou was first elected as an MEP from Cyprus in 2019 and was re-elected in the 2024 European Parliament election. In the European Parliament, he is a member of the far-left group The Left (GUE/NGL).

=== Political positions ===
He abstained from the initial resolution condemning Russia’s invasion of Ukraine.

In 2023, he was one of the 14 MEPs who voted against a resolution condemning the abduction of Tibetan children and other forced assimilation practices by China.

In July 2024, he voted against a European Parliament resolution reaffirming continued EU support for Ukraine.
