= Stella Kyriakides =

Cypriot politician (born 1956)

- Στέλλα Κυριακίδου
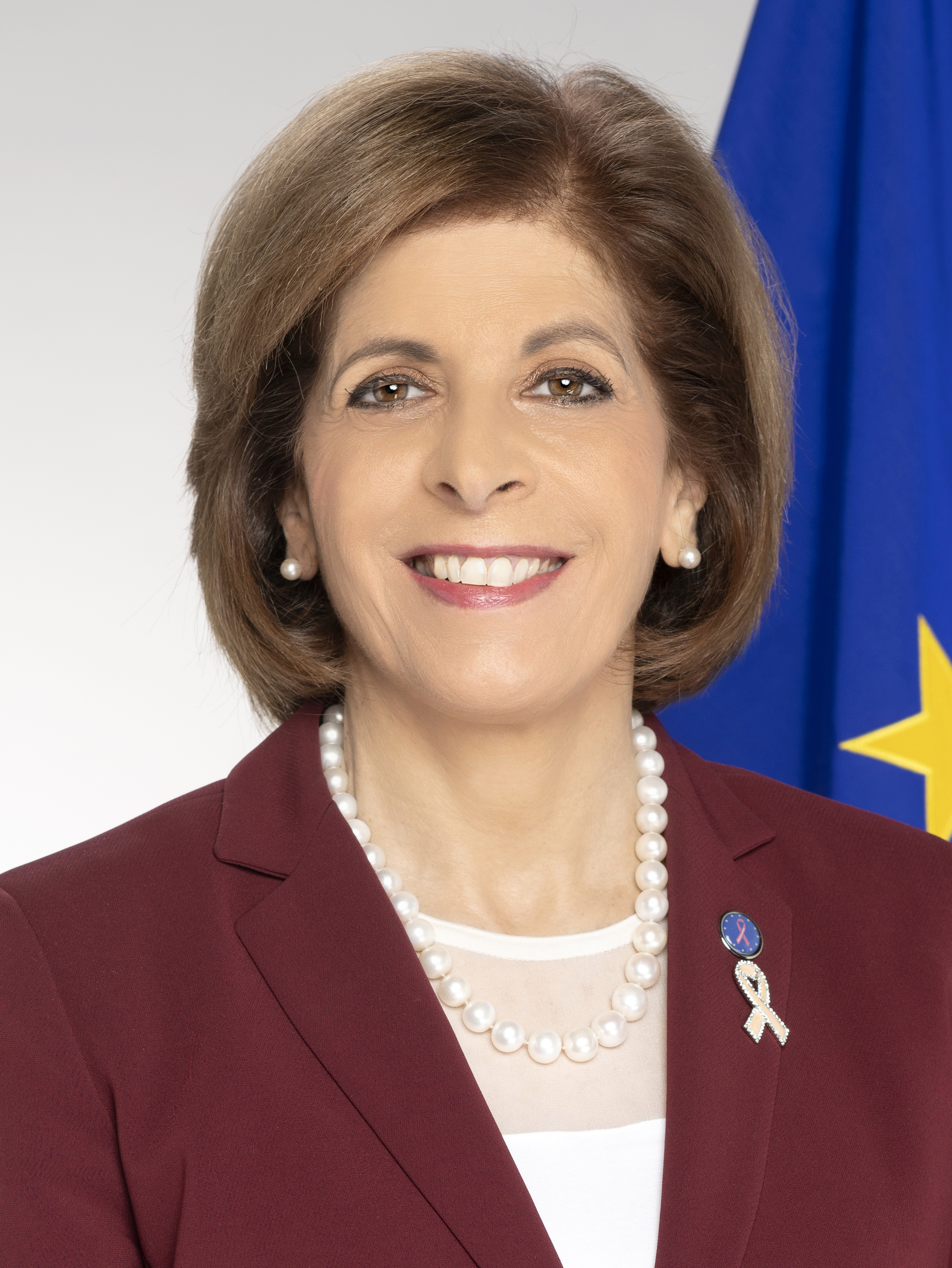
- Kyriakides in 2020

European Commissioner for Health and Food Safety
- In office 1 December 2019 – 30 November 2024
- Preceded by: Vytenis Andriukaitis
- Succeeded by: Olivér Várhelyi

30th President of the Parliamentary Assembly of the Council of Europe
- In office 6 October 2017 – 26 January 2018
- Commission: Von der Leyen I
- Preceded by: Pedro Agramunt
- Succeeded by: Michele Nicoletti

Member of the House of Representatives
- In office 2006–2019

Personal details
- Born: 10 March 1956 (age 70) Nicosia, Cyprus
- Party: Democratic Rally
- Other political affiliations: European People's Party
- Children: 2
- Education: University of Reading; University of Manchester

Stella Kyriakides (Greek: Στέλλα Κυριακίδου, Stella Kyriakidou; born 10 March 1956) is a Cypriot psychologist and politician of the conservative Democratic Rally party who served as European Commissioner for Health and Food Safety from 2019 to 2024. She was the first Cypriot national and third woman to serve as President of the Parliamentary Assembly of the Council of Europe.

== Early life and education ==
Born in Nicosia, Kyriakides got a degree in psychology from the University of Reading and a master's degree in child maladjustment at the Victoria University of Manchester.

== Early career ==
Kyriakides worked in the Ministry of Health between 1976 and 2006, as a clinical psychologist in the department of Child and Adolescent psychiatry.

In 1999 Kyriakides was elected as president of the First Breast Cancer Movement in Cyprus. From 2004 until 2006, she served as president of the European Breast Cancer Coalition Europa Donna. In 2016, she was appointed President of the National Committee on Cancer Strategy of the Council. Stella Kyriakides was also recognized as one of the 100 Influential Women in Oncology by OncoDaily.

== Political career ==
=== Politics of Cyprus ===
Standing for the conservative Democratic Rally, Kyriakides was elected as a deputy in the 2006 Cypriot legislative election, representing Nicosia District, Since 2013, Kyriakides has served as a vice president of the Democratic Rally party, under the leadership of its president Nicos Anastasiades.

In 2018, Kyriakides pushed for a law decriminalizing abortion in Cyprus.

=== Council of Europe ===
In addition to her parliamentary duties in Cyprus, from 2012 until 2019 Kyriakides served as the chairperson of the Cyprus delegation to the Parliamentary Assembly of the Council of Europe (PACE). From 2016 until 2018, she chaired the PACE Committee on Social Affairs, Health, and Regional Development. In October 2017, after the resignation of the Spanish member Pedro Agramunt, she ran for the presidency of the PACE, winning the voting in the third round against the Lithuanian Emanuelis Zingeris. From 2018 until 2019, she served as the PACE representative to the Venice Commission.

=== European Commissioner ===
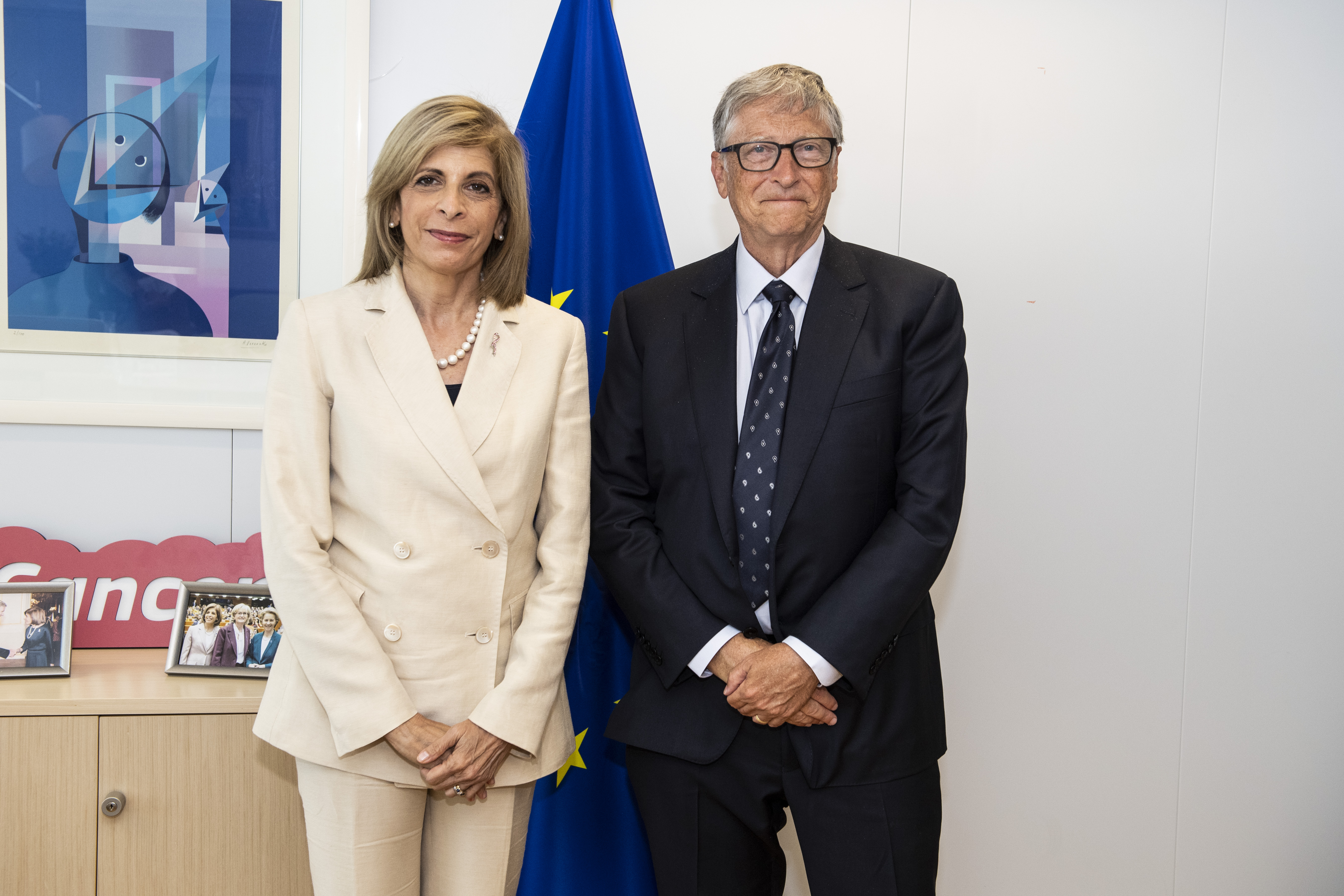
Stella Kyriakide alongside Bill Gates during her term as European Commissioner for Health.

Following the 2019 European elections, President Nicos Anastasiades nominated Kyriakides to become the country's next European Commissioner.

In early March 2020, Kyriakides was appointed by President Ursula von der Leyen to serve on a special task force to coordinate the European Union's response to the COVID-19 pandemic.

Kyriakides has also been chairing the European People's Party Health Ministers Meeting (alongside Peter Liese), which gathers the center-right EPP ministers ahead of meetings of the Employment, Social Policy, Health and Consumer Affairs Council (EPSCO).

Following the 2024 European elections, Kyriakides announced that she would not be available for another term and instead expressed her intention to return to Cyprus.

==== Vaccination procurement during COVID-19 pandemic ====
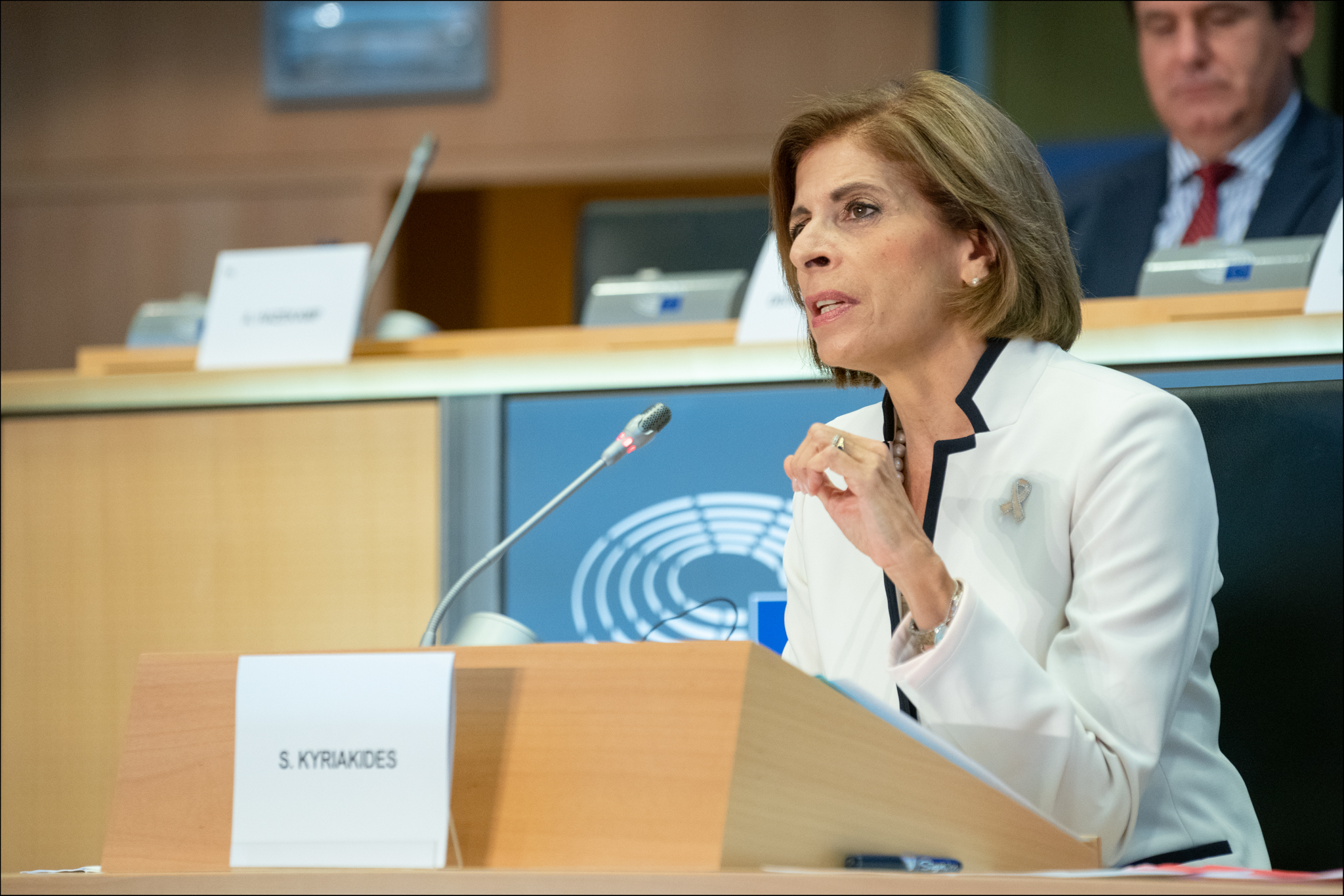

Kyriakides came under attack by the international media and the public as her procurement of COVID-19 vaccines was said to be slow and insufficient, especially in comparison to the United States and the United Kingdom. AstraZeneca's CEO, Soriot, blamed the EU for being three months slower than the U.K. in finalizing its purchase agreements for the vaccine, which AstraZeneca had developed. According to the German tabloid newspaper Bild-Zeitung, Germany's Health Minister Jens Spahn had warned Chancellor Angela Merkel about Kyriakides’ slow response time. However, Kyriakides rejected all criticism and defended the EU joint procurement strategy, claiming that it had "medical and social virtues". She also rejected the logic of "first come, first served,", arguing "that may work at the neighborhood butcher’s but not in contracts." AstraZeneca hit back, stating that the contract only included 'best efforts' to supply the EU commission, whereas the UK contract included provisions to supply the entirety of the UK from the company's British plants first, before allowing export overseas.

== Other activities ==
- Titan Cement, Independent Member of the Board of Directors (since 2026)

== Personal life ==
Kyriakides has two children. She had breast cancer in 1996 and 2004.

Political offices
Preceded by Christos Stylianides	Cypriot European Commissioner; 2019–	Incumbent
