= Pambos Papageorgiou =

Cypriot politician

Pampos Papageorgiou

MP of AKEL
- In office 2011–2016
- Constituency: Kyrenia

Personal details
- Born: 15 June 1963 (age 63) Argaki, Nicosia, Cyprus
- Education: National and Kapodistrian University of Athens; King's College London; University College London

Pampos Papageorgiou (Greek: Πάμπος Παπαγεωργίου; born 15 June 1963) is a Cypriot politician who has been Progressive Party of Working People (AKEL) member of the House of Representatives for Kyrenia since May 2011. He was educated at the National and Kapodistrian University of Athens, King's College London (MA, Philosophy) and University College London (PhD, Political Philosophy).

He teaches philosophy at European University Cyprus.
