= George Perdikes =

Cypriot politician

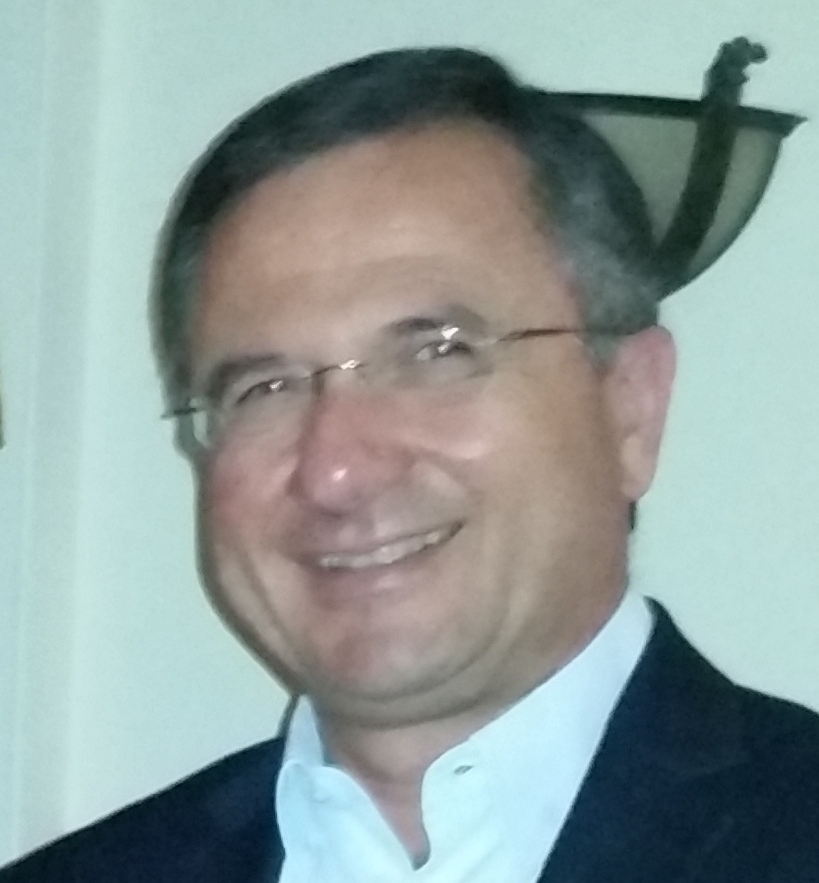
George Perdikes in 2015

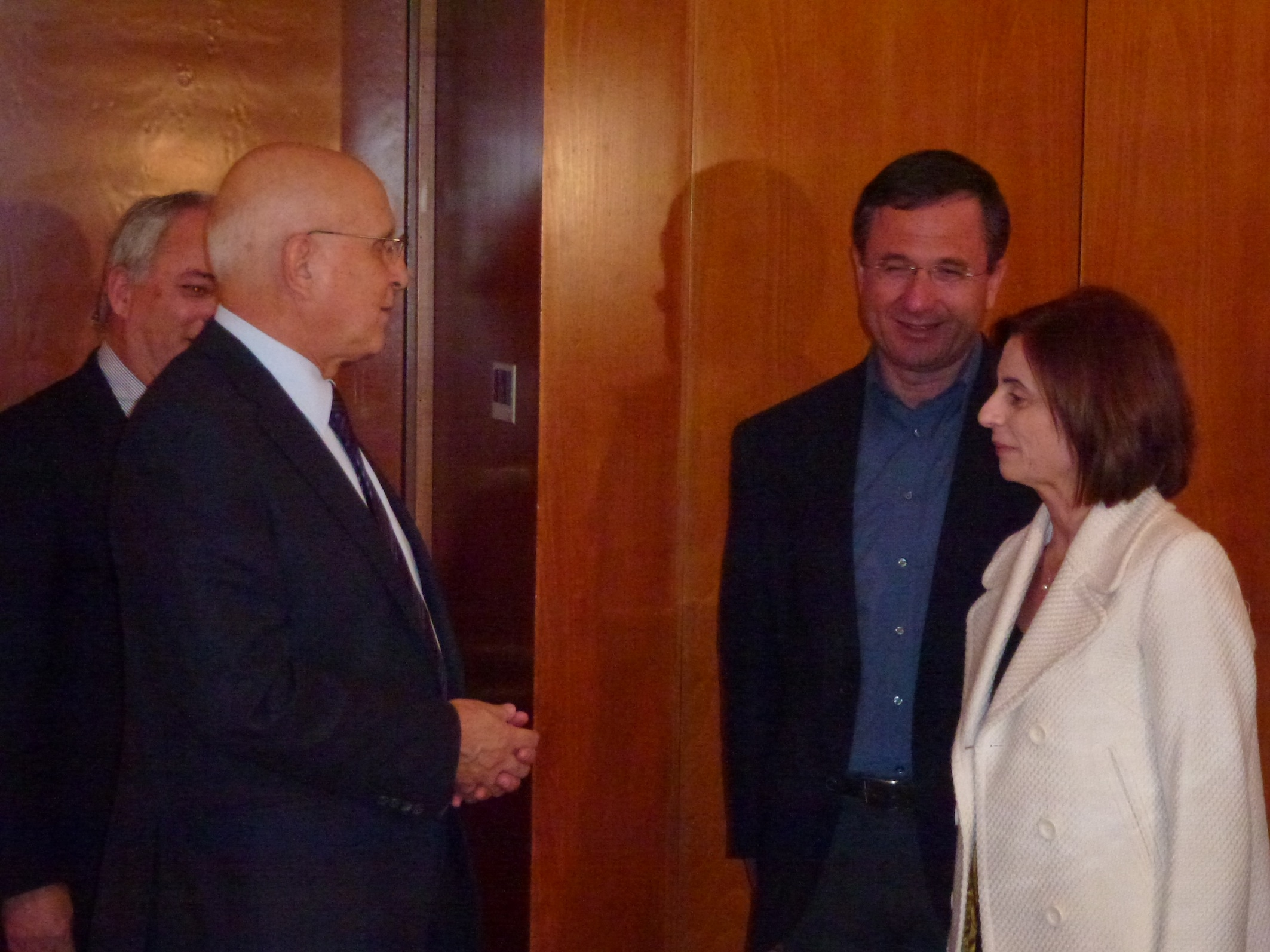

Giorgos Perdikis (Greek: Γιώργος Περδίκης; born 23 March 1962) is a Cypriot politician who was the leader of the Cyprus Green Party from 2014 to 2020 and is a Member of the House of Representatives since 2001.

Perdikis studied civil engineering at the Aristotle University of Thessaloniki. He is married and has two sons.
