= 2011 Cypriot legislative election =

- 22 May 2011

56 of the 59 seats in the House of Representatives
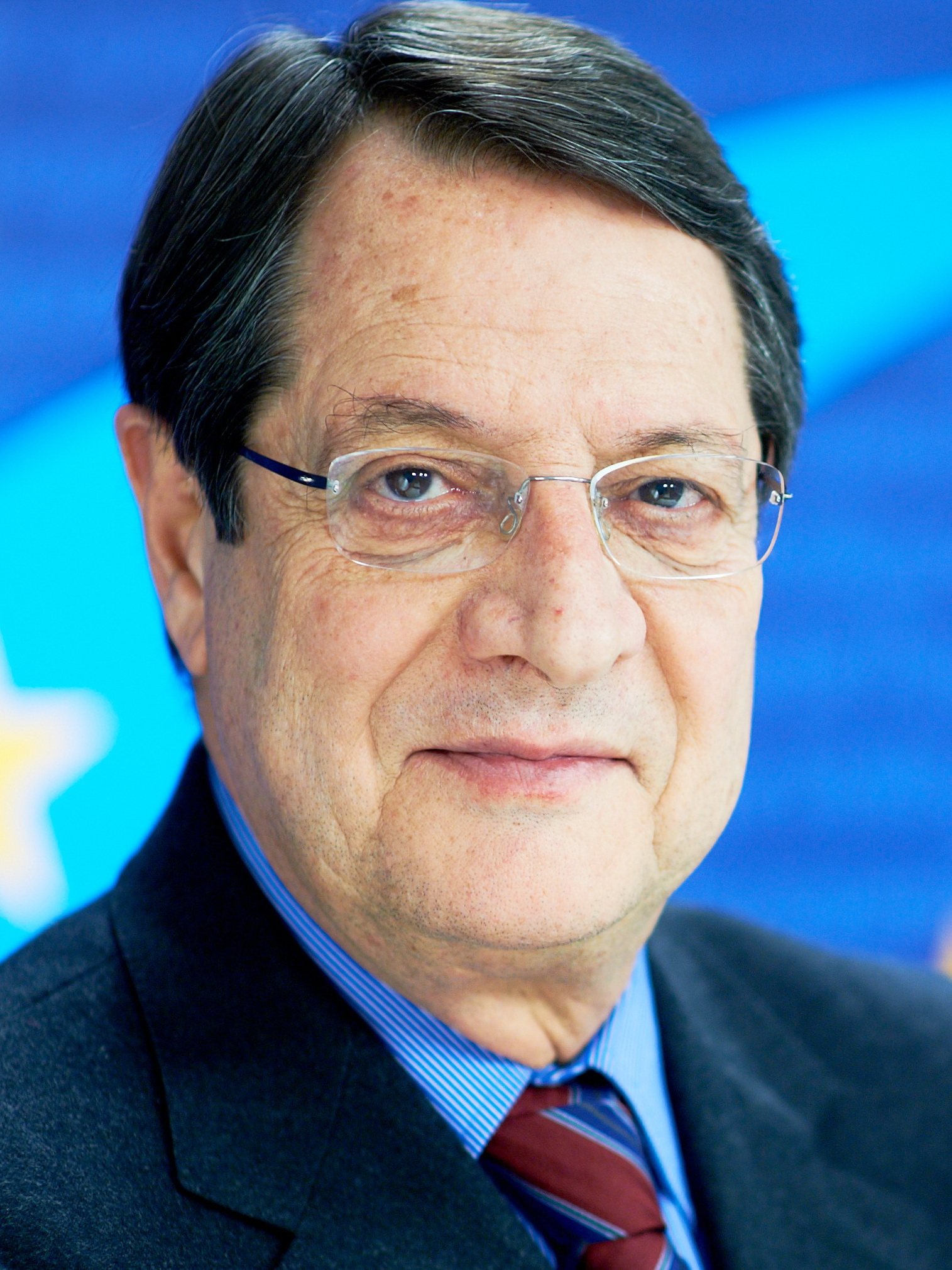

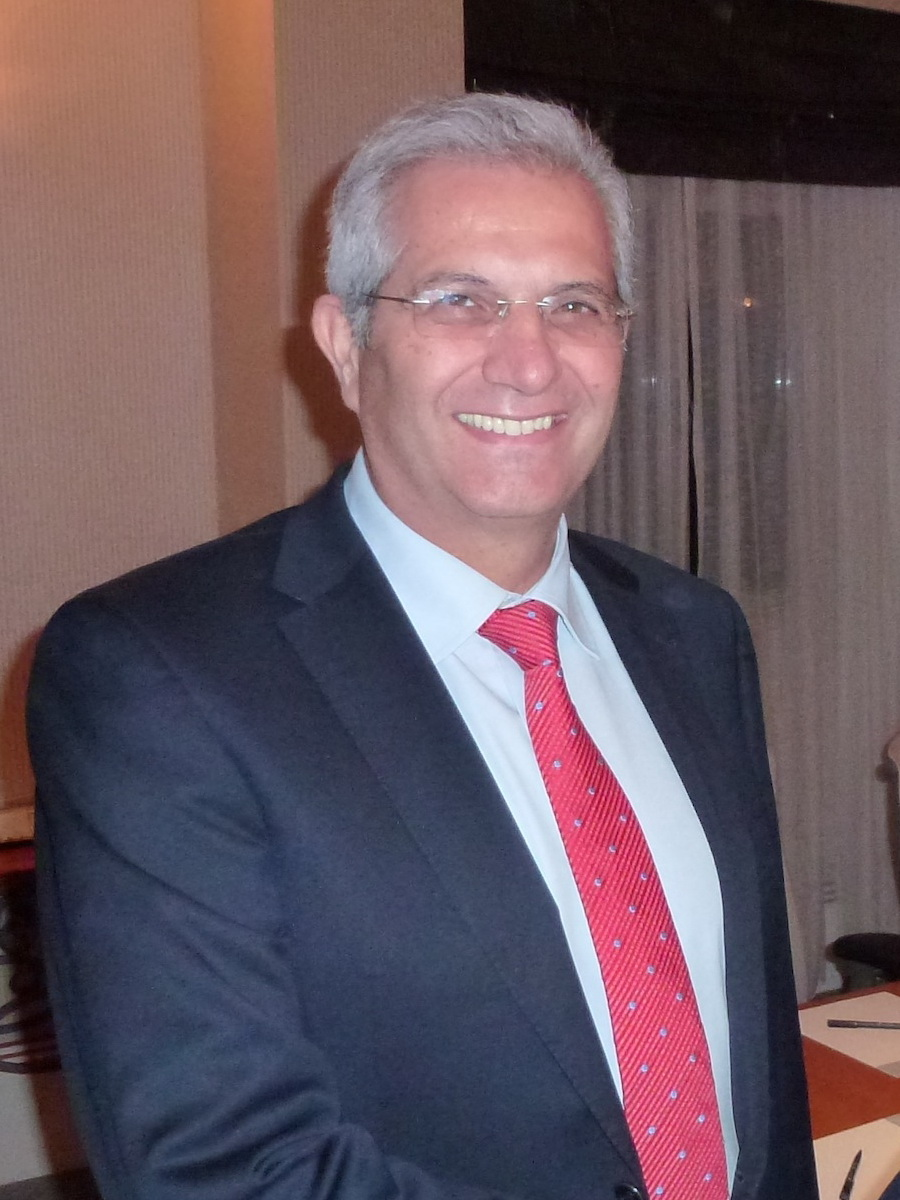

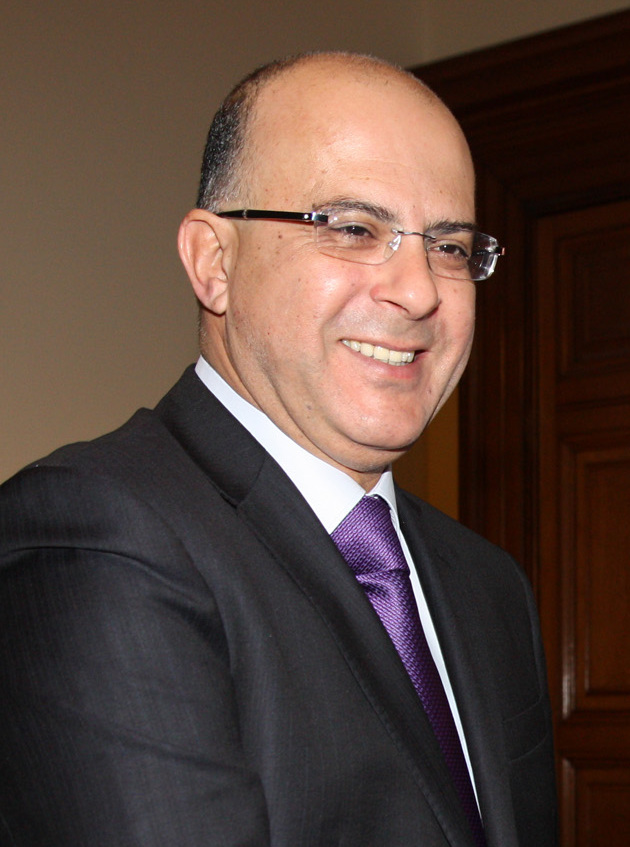

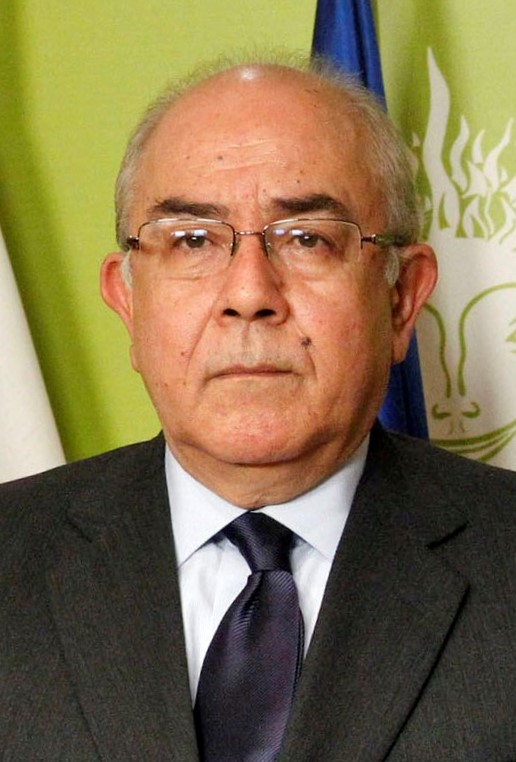

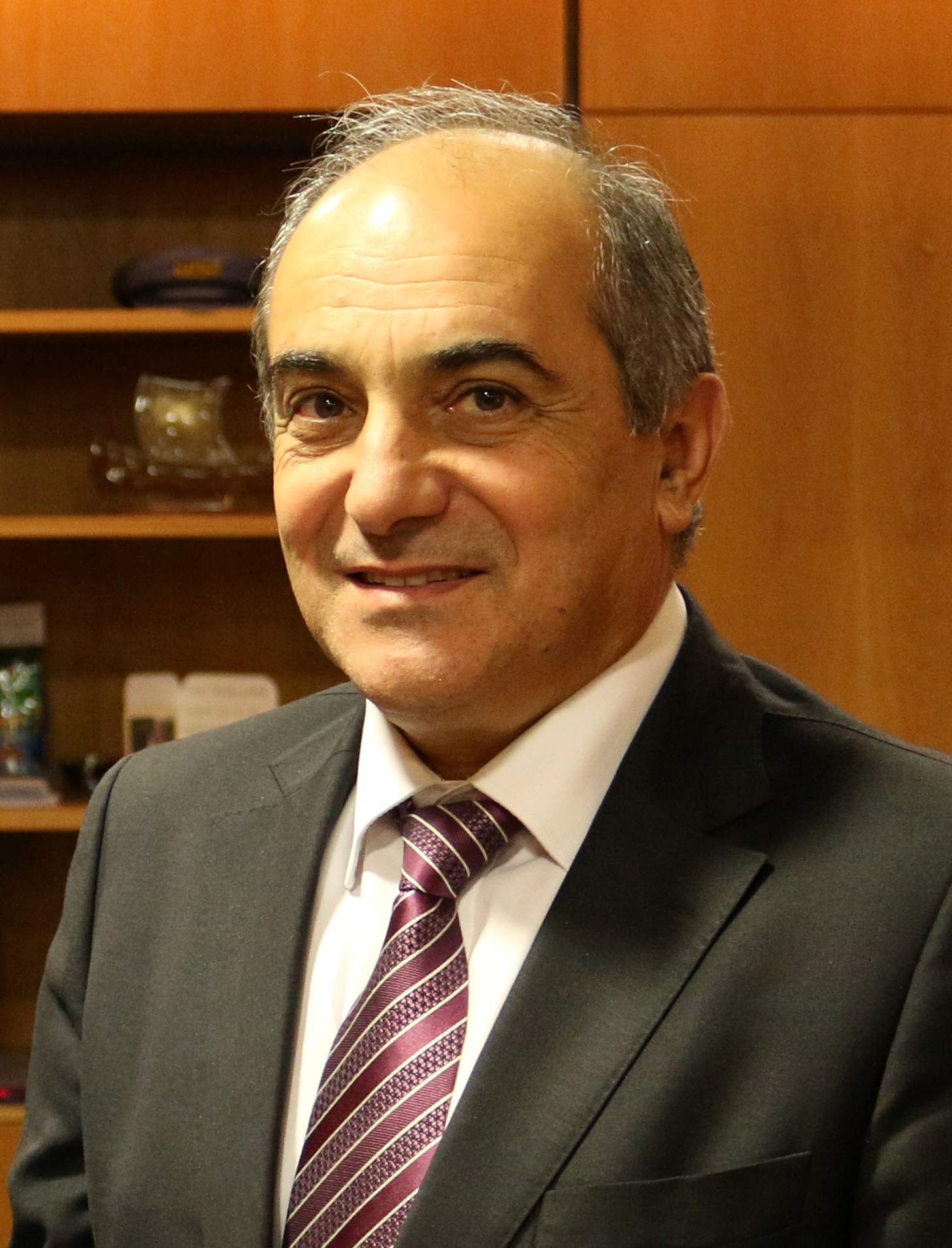

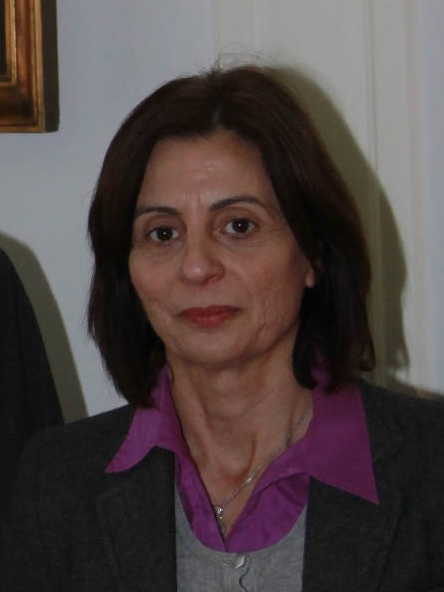
	First party	Second party	Third party
Leader	Nicos Anastasiades	Andros Kyprianou	Marios Garoyian
Party	DISY	AKEL	DIKO
Last election	30.3%, 18 seats	31.3%, 18 seats	17.9%, 11 seats
Seats won	20	19	9
Seat change	▲2	▲1	▼2
Popular vote	138,682	132,171	63,763
Percentage	34.3%	32.7%	15.8%
Swing	▲4.0pp	▲1.4pp	▼2.1pp
	Fourth party	Fifth party	Sixth party
Leader	Yiannakis Omirou	Demetris Syllouris	Ioanna Panayiotou
Party	EDEK	European Party	Greens
Last election	8.9%, 5 seats	5.8%, 3 seats	2.0%, 1 seats
Seats won	5	2	1
Seat change	Steady	▼1	Steady
Popular vote	36,113	15,711	8,960
Percentage	8.9%	3.9%	2.2%
Swing	▼0.0pp	▼2.3pp	▲0.2pp

Parliamentary elections were held in Cyprus on 22 May 2011 to elect the 56 Members of the House of Representatives. They were won by the Democratic Rally, who increased their seats from 18 to 20. The governing Progressive Party of Working People also gained a seat, bringing them up to 19. The Democratic Party lost two of their 11 seats and the European Party lost one of their three seats. The Movement for Social Democracy held on to their five seats.

== Background ==
The election follows a presidential election in Northern Cyprus which was won by the right-wing candidate Dervis Eroglu, who beat leftist incumbent Mehmet Ali Talat, amid fears of a halt in peace talks for a unified Cyprus; it also follows a similar legislative election.

Conversely, in Greece the previous election was won by the Panhellenic Socialist Movement defeating the conservative New Democracy. Roughly a month later, Turkey would hold its own general election.

The Interior Ministry estimated a total Greek Cypriot eligible voting population of 530,000. Additionally, about 544 Turkish Cypriots residing in Cyprus proper are eligible to vote. The Interior Minisitry also called on Cypriot expatriates to register for the election by the end of January, so as to make preparations for polling stations.

=== Cypriot conflict ===
The election was important as an adverse result against conflict resolution talks could also affect Turkey's accession to the European Union. Though this election would not directly affect the 2013 Cypriot presidential election, it could set a precedent for coalition alliances.

Current negotiations between the two parties concern the establishment of a federation of two states with a loose central government, though implementing the proposal has run into obstacles and northern part of Cyprus have not abandoned a wish for independence. Such hindrances to unification include territorial swaps and property rights of thousands of internally displaced persons.

== Parties ==
Incumbent President Demetris Christofias governed with a coalition of his Communist Progressive Party of Working People (AKEL) and the centrist Democratic Party (DIKO) which has 11 seats. Both AKEL and the centre-right Democratic Rally (DISY) have 18 seats. However, DIKO dropped out of the coalition in August 2011, forcing AKEL into a minority position in the house of representatives.

Other parties include: the Movement for Social Democracy (EDEK) (currently five seats), the European Party (currently three seats) and the Ecological and Environmental Movement (currently with one seat).

== Campaign ==
DIKO has criticised Christofias' offer for a rotating presidency with Turkish Cypriots as part of deal to settle the Cypriot conflict.

The incumbent government was also criticised for its "slow response" to the 2012–2013 Cypriot financial crisis, in which Cyprus experienced its first recession in more than three decades.

== Opinion polls ==
The opposition centre-right Democratic Rally showed a slight lead of the AKEL Party. Though it was still forecast to fall short of a majority in the 59-seat parliament.

== Results ==
Democratic Rally finished with 34.27 percent and AKEL followed with 32.67 percent.

The high abstention rate of 21% was also noted considering that voting is compulsory.

Party	Votes	%	Seats	+/–
Democratic Rally	138,682	34.28	20	+2
Progressive Party of Working People	132,171	32.67	19	+1
Democratic Party	63,763	15.76	9	−2
Movement for Social Democracy	36,113	8.93	5	0
European Party	15,711	3.88	2	−1
Ecological and Environmental Movement	8,960	2.21	1	0
ELAM	4,354	1.08	0	New
LASOK	2,667	0.66	0	0
Balance – Independent Citizens Movement	859	0.21	0	New
Cypriot Progressive Cooperation	709	0.18	0	New
Independents	588	0.15	0	0
Total	404,577	100.00	56	0
Valid votes	404,577	96.73		
Invalid/blank votes	13,670	3.27		
Total votes	418,247	100.00		
Registered voters/turnout	531,463	78.70		
Source: MOI

== Reactions ==
An op-ed in the Turkish Hurriyet suggested two repercussions: an impact on the presidential election; and an effect to the United Nations-led direct reunification talks. This could be further hurt as the junior members of the governing coalition had shown signs of a rift with AKEL and Christofias over the reunification talks, as well as social and economic policies. It suggested a "grand coalition," though acknowledging it was a massive task due to the burgeoning ambitions of both the two biggest parties for the presidency between incumbent Christofias and the DISY's Nicos Anastasiades. It also pointed out that though AKEL still had wide-backing their overall performance of the government had lost some support. Additionally, it suggested peace talks would add pressure to Northern Cyprus should a grand coalition come to fruition and bring in a "strong leadership...to engage in a give-and-take." The first test of such a possibility would be the election of the parliamentary speaker.

[A grand coalition] would produce the best chance ever for a Cyprus settlement. – Hurriyet

== Aftermath ==
A coalition government was formed in 2008 between the incumbent AKEL and DIKO parties. However, on 3 August 2011 DIKO withdrew from the coalition citing its differences over resolution of the Cypriot conflict and consequently leaving AKEL with a minority government. Following a meeting with President Dimitris Christofias, party leader Marios Garoyian said that "despite our continued efforts and repeated appeals, unfortunately, the wished-for understanding between political forces which is so needed in these crucial moments for our country couldn't (sic) be achieved." Part of Garoyian's demands, following his criticism of Christofias, was that the president withdraw proposals for a rotating presidency of a potential unified Cyprus. Government spokesman Stefanos Stefanou said that though Christofias regrets DIKO's withdrawal from the government he would go ahead with a cabinet reshuffle: "The aim is for the new government is to confront the challenges our country faces with dynamism and determination." He also added that the government would not withdraw proposals during an "intensified period of negotiations" following UN Secretary-Genera; Ban Ki-moon's urging to resolve all core issues by October, including resolving the matter of private property losses from the war.
