= Andros Kyprianou =

Cypriot politician

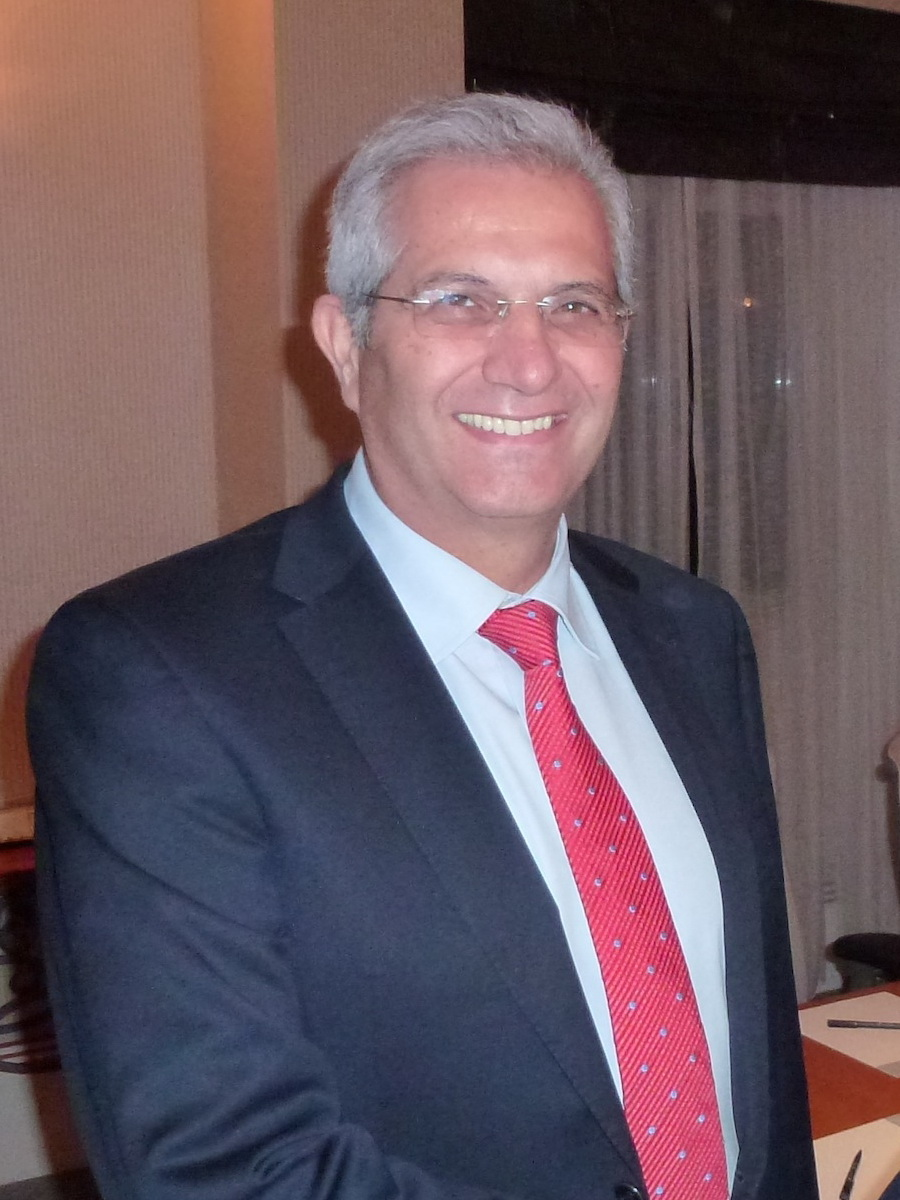

5th General Secretary of the Progressive Party of Working People
- In office 21 January 2009 – 4 July 2021
- Preceded by: Dimitris Christofias
- Succeeded by: Stefanos Stefanou

Member of the Cypriot House of Representatives
- Incumbent
- Assumed office 2001
- Constituency: Nicosia

Personal details
- Born: 26 October 1955 (age 70) Strovolos, Nicosia, Cyprus
- Party: Progressive Party of Working People

Andros Kyprianou (Greek: Άνδρος Κυπριανού) is a Cypriot politician, who was the General Secretary of the Progressive Party of Working People (AKEL) from 2009 to 2021, and currently serves as a Member of the House of Representatives since 2001.

== Personal life ==
He was born in Strovolos, Nicosia on 26 October 1955, the youngest of his family's four children. He has a brother and two sisters.

He attended the elementary school in Strovolos and graduated from the Higher Technical Institute of Nicosia in 1973. He graduated from the Civil Engineering Faculty of the Higher Technical Institute of Nicosia in 1976. In badminton, Andros Kyprianou won the 1988 Cyprus International in the mixed doubles together with Christine Heatly of Scotland.

He is married to Sofia Podina. They have two children, Evi and Dimitris.

== Early life and education ==
From the age of 12 until the completion of his studies, he worked every summer as a construction worker. In 1976, he worked at the Higher Technical Institute until 1988. During this time, he also attended a series of classes in pedagogy at the Pedagogical Institute and concluded his post-graduate studies in Rimini, Italy (1984–85). From a young age, he actively participated in sports and athletics. He was a football player and captain of the football team of the PARNASSOS Strovolos Club. He was also a founding member of the Badminton team of the Club. At school, he also pursued track events and took part in Pancyprian races. He served as president of the Association of Graduates of the Higher Technical Institute and as a member of the Administrative Council of the Higher Technical Institute. He served as the general secretary of POEL (Nicosia District Football Federation) and vice-president of the Cyprus Badminton Federation. He also was involved in a number of sports and was time after time Cyprus champion in Badminton. In 1986, the Union of Sports Journalists of Cyprus proclaimed him as Sportsperson of the Year in Badminton. He became a member of AKEL in 1974, whilst previously he joined the EDON Youth Organisation. In EDON, he was a member of the EDON District Council of Nicosia, and of the Sports Bureau of the Central Council of EDON and a regular contributor to the newspaper of EDON "NEOLEA".

== Political career ==
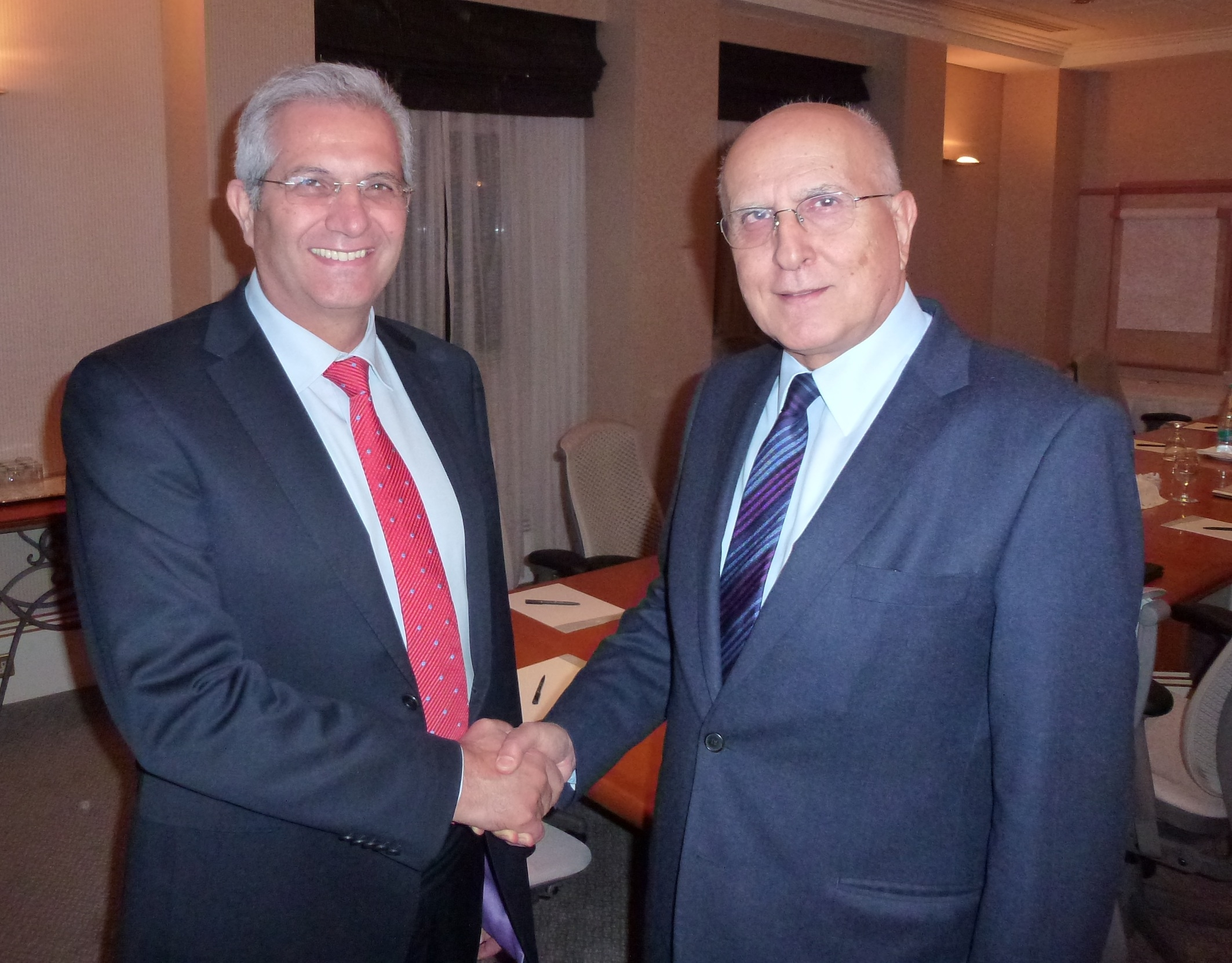
Andros Kyprianou with the Greek Foreign Minister Stavros Dimas

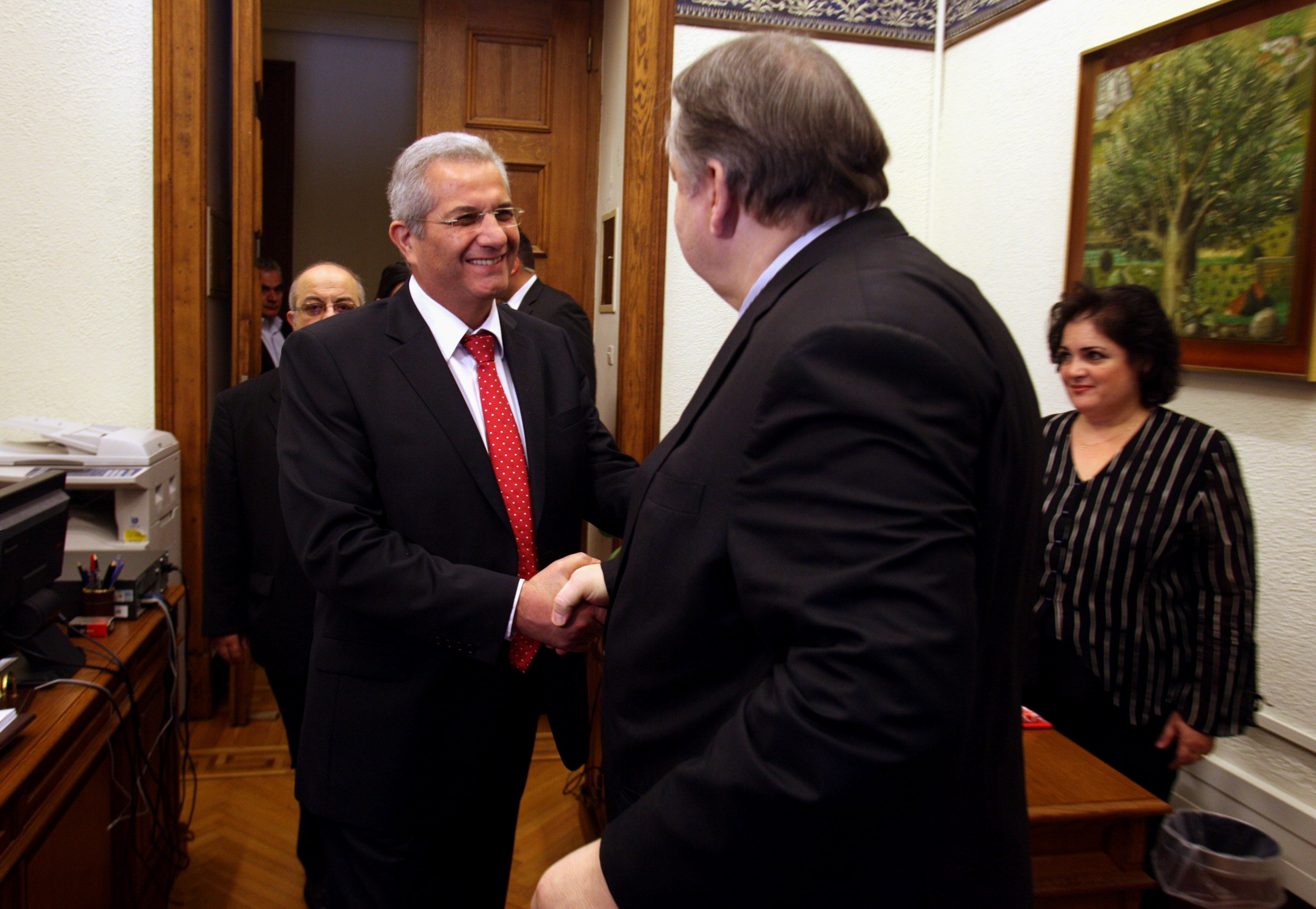
Andros Kyprianou and Evangelos Venizelos meeting in February 2014

He served as a member of the Borough Committee of AKEL Strovolos and a member of the District Committee of AKEL Nicosia. In 1988, he was employed as a full-time official at the Central Committee of AKEL, whilst in 1990 he was elected to the Central Committee. In 1995, he was re-elected to the Central Committee and a member of the Political Bureau of the Party. In 2000, he was re-elected as a member of the Political Bureau and elected a member of the Secretariat of the C.C. In 2005, he was re-elected to all the Bodies of the Party.

He served as Head of the Sports Bureau, Local Authorities Bureau, Environment Bureau, International Relations Bureau and European Affairs Bureau of the C.C. of AKEL. He was also the Press Spokesman of the Party between 2003 and 2009. He also served as Municipal Councillor of Strovolos. At the parliamentary elections of 27 May 2001, he was elected Member of the House of Representatives standing as an AKEL-Left-New Forces candidate in Nicosia and was re-elected at the parliamentary elections of 21 May 2006. He was a member of the Committee of Selection and Chairman of the House Standing Committee on Internal Affairs and of the House Standing Committee on Labour and Social Insurance. Today he is a member of the Committee of Selection, Chairman of the House Standing Committee on Internal Affairs, member of the House Standing Committee on Foreign Affairs and of the House Standing Committee on Development Plans and Public Expenditure Control.

He was also the Head of the Delegation of the House of Representatives to the Parliamentary Assembly of the Council of Europe . In April 2008, he was unanimously elected as one of the vice-presidents of the Parliamentary Assembly of the Council of Europe for the year 2008. Today he is a member of the National Council since February 2008.

On 21 January 2009 he was elected General Secretary of the Central Committee of AKEL and was re-elected to the same position at the 21st Congress of AKEL in November 2010.

Kyprianou closely cooperated with Russian politicians and businessmen and in 2016 he was listed as one of the key figures in pushing the Progressive Party of Working People motion calling for removal of sanctions on Russia. Text of the motion was reportedly prepared by Russia's International Agency for Current Policy, channeling money from Russia for European politicians. In April 2016 Kyprianou introduced a motion to recognise the illegal Russian annexation of Crimea as well as demand that the resulting sanctions on Russia be lifted. This was done in co-operation with a request from the International Agency for Current Policy, an organisation run by the Russian Duma that sought to promote legitimisation of the Russian annexation of Crimea through what has been alleged to be bribery. In October 2016 Kyprianou travelled to Crimea, reportedly at the behest of Cypriot-Russian businessman Dmitry Kozlov, where he met with two leading figures promoting investment in the peninsula.
