= Progressive Party of Working People =

Communist party in Cyprus

Progressive Party of Working People Ανορθωτικό Κόμμα Εργαζόμενου Λαού Emekçi Halkın İlerici Partisi
- Abbreviation: AKEL
- General Secretary: Stefanos Stefanou
- Founded: KKK: 15 August 1926 (100 years ago); AKEL: 14 April 1941 (85 years ago)
- Headquarters: Nicosia
- Newspaper: Haravgi
- Student wing: Progressive Student Movement
- Youth wing: EDON
- Women's wing: POGO
- Labour wing: PEO
- Ideology: Communism; Marxism–Leninism; Cypriotism; Federalism; Soft Euroscepticism
- Political position: Left-wing to far-left
- European affiliation: Party of the European Left (observer)
- European Parliament group: The Left in the European Parliament
- International affiliation: IMCWP
- Colours: Red
- House of Representatives: 15 / 56
- European Parliament: 1 / 6
- Municipal Councils: 123 / 478

Website
- akel.org.cy
- Politics of Cyprus; Political parties; Elections; Formerly: Communist Party of Cyprus (KKK); Κομμουνιστικό Κόμμα Κύπρου; Kıbrıs Komünist Partisi (1926–1941/44)

The Progressive Party of Working People (Greek: Ανορθωτικό Κόμμα Εργαζόμενου Λαού, ΑΚΕΛ, romanized: Anorthotikó Kómma Ergazómenou Laoú, AKEL; Turkish: Emekçi Halkın İlerici Partisi) is a Marxist-Leninist party in Cyprus.

AKEL is one of the two major parties in Cyprus, and it supports a federal solution of the internal aspect of the Cyprus problem and it places particular emphasis on rapprochement with the Turkish Cypriots. It supported entry into the European Union with certain reservations. Initially supportive of the Annan Plan in 2004, the AKEL ultimately opposed the plan because the UN Security Council did not provide guarantees on post-reunification security.

As a strong supporter of welfare benefits and nationalization, AKEL successfully put into practice several social measures to support the economic welfare of Cypriots during the Great Recession, such as increasing low pensions by 30% and strengthening the welfare benefits given to university students to €12 million per year. Overall, €1.2 billion were spent on welfare benefits during the first three years that AKEL was in power, with various improvements made in social welfare provision. The party has been in opposition since the 2013 election. The party's candidate was defeated in the 2018 presidential election against the incumbent president. For the 2023 presidential election, the party supported independent candidate Andreas Mavroyiannis, who was also defeated.

The party supports the formal recognition of same-sex couples and same-sex marriage, and opposes discrimination based on sexual orientation and gender identity.

== History ==
It was founded in 1926 with the name Communist Party of Cyprus (KKK; Greek: Κομμουνιστικό Κόμμα Κύπρου, Turkish: Kıbrıs Komünist Partisi). The communist party set as its aim not only the struggle against exploitation, but also the independence of Cyprus from British rule. The party became illegal in 1931 when the British colonial government-imposed restrictions on civil rights following the Cyprus revolt riot. In 1941, leading members of the underground communist party and others founded the Progressive Party of Working People (AKEL). In the first municipal elections in 1943 (before that mayors were appointed) AKEL candidates became mayors of Limassol (Ploutis Servas) and Famagusta (Adam Adamantos). At the 5th KKK congress in November 1944, the KKK and AKEL united into one party, the KKK was merged into AKEL.

Unlike its predecessor, AKEL was not against Enosis. Instead, AKEL supported a gradual process, starting off with a constitution and self-government, while Cyprus would remain a colony, leading to self-determination and Enosis. After the failure of the consultative assembly in 1949 to grant a constitution acceptable to the Cypriot members, AKEL changed line, supporting immediate Enosis with no intermediate stages.

During the late 1950s, AKEL was opposed to the violent tactics followed by the anti-British resistance movement of EOKA. EOKA accused AKEL of being collaborators with the British, even though AKEL had also been illegal since 1955. Several AKEL members were assassinated by EOKA at the time for being "traitors", including AKEL supporter Savas Menikou, who was stoned to death. AKEL denounced EOKA's leadership as being anti-communist, as its leader George Grivas had fought against the communist side during the Greek Civil War. Grivas later founded EOKA B, which supported the 1974 coup d'état following his death.

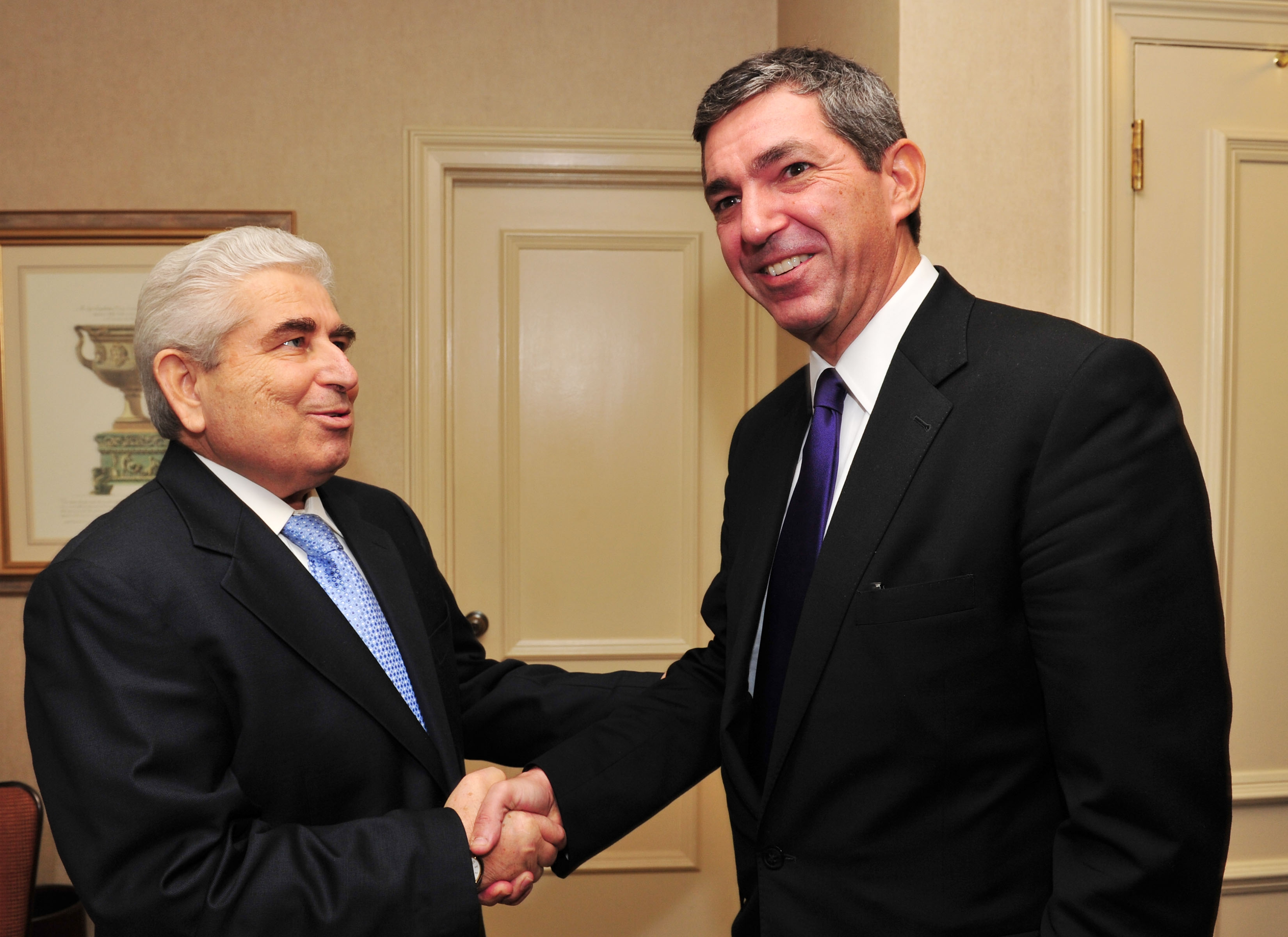
Foreign Minister of Greece Stavros Lambrinidis and President of Cyprus Demetris Christofias during his tenure in New York City in October 2011

About 1958, the Turkish Cypriot nationalist organization TMT started forcing Turkish Cypriots members of AKEL to leave. Editor of a workers' newspaper Fazıl Önder was killed and the head of the Turkish bureau of PEO (AKEL's trade union) Ahmet Sadi moved to the UK to save his life.

In the first presidential elections for independent Cyprus, AKEL backed Ioannis Kliridis (father of Glafkos Klerides) against Makarios III. The last Turkish Cypriot to be a member of the central committee of AKEL, Derviş Ali Kavazoğlu, was killed by TMT in 1965.

In the mid 1960s the U.S. State Department estimated the party membership to be approximately 10,000 (3.25% of the working age population).

=== Recent history ===
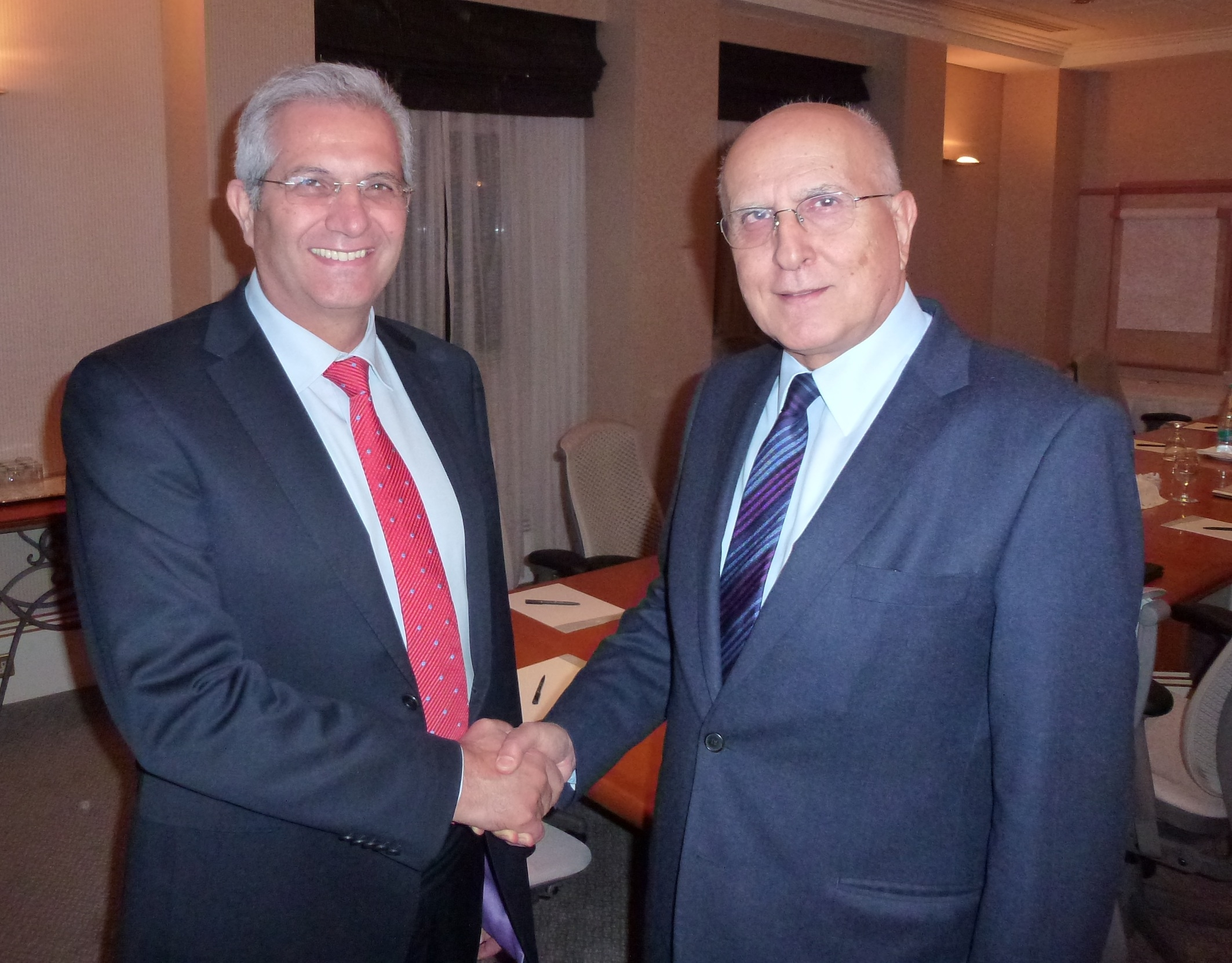
Greek Foreign Minister Stavros Dimas (to the right) and leader of AKEL Andros Kyprianou

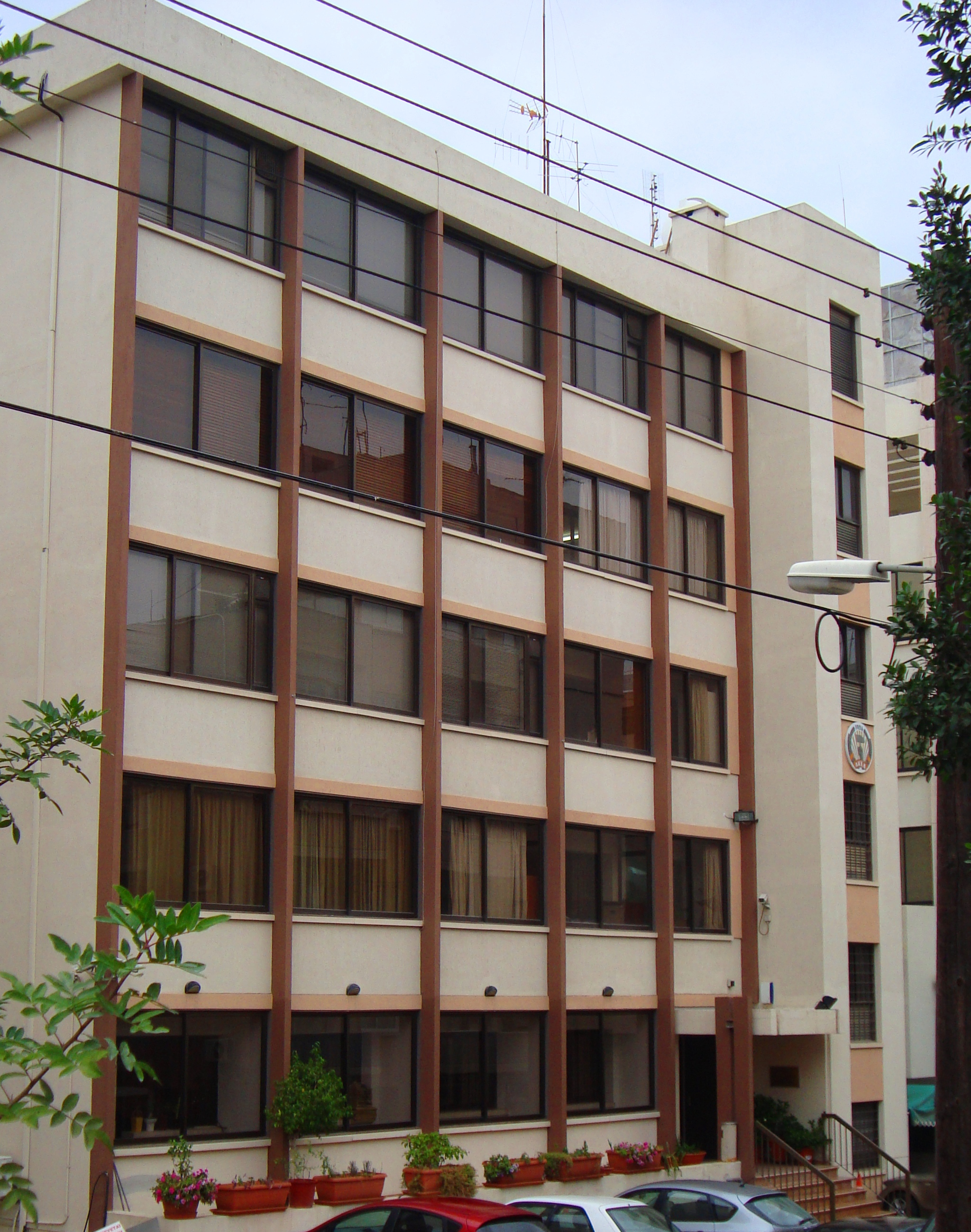
AKEL headquarters in Nicosia, Cyprus

At the legislative elections on 27 May 2001, the party won 34.7% of the popular vote and 20 out of 56 seats. After this election, AKEL's General Secretary, Dimitris Christofias, was elected as President of the House of Representatives, serving in that post until 2006. His election was supported by AKEL, Movement for Social Democracy (EDEK), and the Democratic Party (DIKO).

AKEL is a member of the European United Left - Nordic Green Left political group in the European Parliament, and it is considered to be moderately Eurosceptic. Cyprus joined the EU in 2004, and in the 2004 European parliament election, AKEL elected two members (Adamos Adamou and Kyriacos Triantaphyllides).

AKEL remained the largest political party in the 2006 Cypriot legislative election; however, the party lost two seats, winning 18 seats with 31.31% of the vote.

In the second round presidential election held on 24 February 2008, Dimitris Christofias, General Secretary of AKEL, was elected President of Cyprus. Christofias won 53.36% of the vote against his right-wing opponent Ioannis Kasoulidis' 46.64%.

On 21 January 2009, Andros Kyprianou was elected general secretary of the party with 54.3% in the central committee election.

In the 2009 election to the European Parliament, AKEL received 34.9% of the votes, and again elected two out of Cyprus' six members (Kyriacos Triantaphyllides and Takis Hadjigeorgiou). In the 2014 election, they held their two seats with a reduced 27% of the vote.

In the 22 May 2011 legislative election AKEL received 32.67% of the votes, and elected 19 out of the 56 members of parliament.

In an interview with Athens News Agency, party leader Andros Kyprianou said that AKEL was considering Cyprus' exit from the eurozone, saying, "It is an option on the table", but that it will require "study and planning".

In the 2013 presidential election, Stavros Malas, who was supported by AKEL lost by a margin of 42.52% to 57.48%. In the 2018 presidential election, conservative president Nicos Anastasiades won a second five-year term with 56 percent of the vote. The AKEL-backed independent candidate, Stavros Malas, lost the election with 44 percent.

In 2016 legislative election AKEL was the second largest party with 25.7 percent of the vote, 7 percent less than the previous election.

Niyazi Kızılyürek was elected to the European Parliament in 2019 for AKEL, making him the first Turkish-Cypriot to enter the European Parliament and thus breaking what was considered a taboo on the island. AKEL advocates the creation of a federal state in which Greek Cypriots and Turkish Cypriots would live together.

== Youth ==
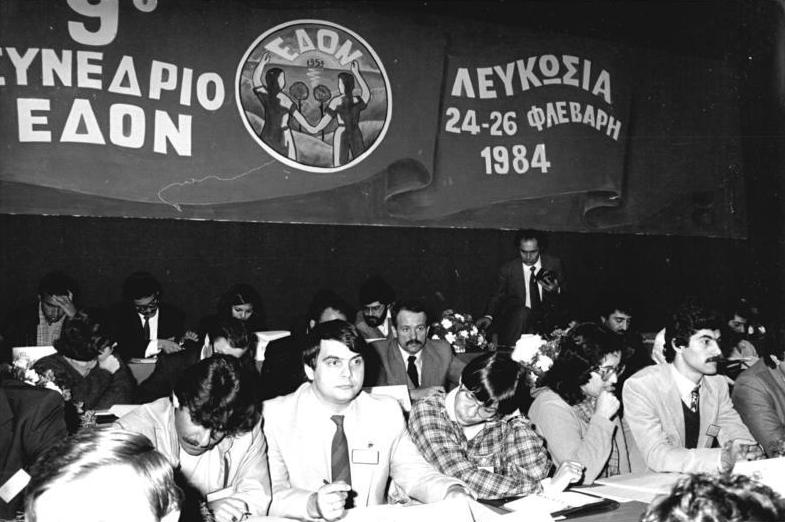
AKEL youth conference in 1984 in Nicosia

The party's youth wing is the United Democratic Youth Organisation, which was founded in 1959.

== Controversies ==
=== Soviet Union and KGB connections ===
In October 2026, archives from the former Soviet Union and its state services (such as the KGB) and declassified files from the Central Intelligence Agency were uncovered as part of an investigation by Cypriot journalists (particularly SigmaLive), which showed proof of AKEL being used as a front by the Soviets to further its interests. This included weapons transfers, financial assisstance to the party and using AKEL students studying in the Soviet Union to launder cash. AKEL was used to further Soviet political aims which included, but are not limited to, termination of Western military base rights in Cyprus, preventing union between Greece and Cyprus, and not letting for the island to be fully integrated into NATO.

Political parties in Cyprus, including DISY and ELAM, heavily criticised and questioned the party for its actions. The press secretary of AKEL, Xaris Polycarpou, did not deny the allegations and as far as weapons were involved, he claimed that they were to be used to defend the Republic of Cyprus.

== Election results ==
=== Parliament ===
House of Representatives
Election	Votes			Seats	
Election	#	%	Rank	#	±
1960	51,719	35.0	2nd	5 / 50	new
1970	68,229	34.1	1st	9 / 35	▲4
1976	With DIKO and EDEK			9 / 35	0
1981	95,364	32.8	1st	12 / 35	▲3
1985	87,628	27.4	3rd	15 / 56	▲3
1991	104,771	30.6	2nd	18 / 56	▲3
1996	121,958	33.0	2nd	19 / 56	▲1
2001	142,648	34.7	1st	20 / 56	▲1
2006	131,237	31.1	1st	18 / 56	▼2
2011	132,171	32.7	2nd	19 / 56	▲1
2016	90,204	25.7	2nd	16 / 56	▼3
2021	79,913	22.3	2nd	15 / 56	▼1
2026	88,777	23.9	2nd	15 / 56	0

=== European Parliament ===
European Parliament
Election	Votes			Seats	
Election	#	%	Rank	#	±
2004	93,212	27.9	2nd	2 / 6	new
2009	106,922	34.9	2nd	2 / 6	0
2014	69,852	27.0	2nd	2 / 6	0
2019	77.241	27.5	2nd	2 / 6	0
2024	79,163	21.5	2nd	1 / 6	▼1

=== Presidential Elections ===
Year	Candidate	Photograph	1st Round			2nd Round			Elected
Year	Candidate	Photograph	Votes	%	Result	Votes	%	Result	Elected
1959	Ioannis Clerides (Democratic Union)		71,753	33.2	2nd place	Lost in first round			No
1968	Archbishop Makarios III (Independent)		220,911	96.3	1st place	Elected in first round			Yes
1973	Archbishop Makarios III (Independent)		no opponent						Yes
1978	Spyros Kyprianou (Democratic Party)		no opponent						Yes
1983	Spyros Kyprianou (Democratic Party)		173,791	56.5	1st place	Elected in first round			Yes
1988	George Vassiliou (Independent)		100,748	30.1	2nd place	167,834	51.6	1st place	Yes
1993	George Vassiliou (Independent)		157,027	44.2	1st place	176,769	49.7	2nd place	No
1998	George Iacovou (Independent)		160,918	40.6	1st place	200,222	49.2	2nd place	No
2003	Tassos Papadopoulos (Democratic Party)		213,353	51.5	1st place	Elected in first round			Yes
2008	Demetris Christofias		150,016	33.3	2nd place	240,604	53.4	1st place	Yes
2013	Stavros Malas		118,755	26.9	2nd place	175,267	42.5	2nd place	No
2018	Stavros Malas		116,920	30.2	2nd place	169,243	44.0	2nd place	No
2023	Andreas Mavroyiannis (Independent)		117,551	29.6	2nd place	189,335	48.0	2nd place	No

== AKEL MPs ==
- 2011–present Adamos Adamou
- 2007–2011 Dina Akkelidou
- 2006–2011 Aristos Aristotelous
- 2011–present Irene Charalambidou
- 1991–2008 Dimitris Christofias
- 2011–present Aristos Damianou
- 2004–2006, 2008-2016 Stella Demetriou Misiaouli
- 1981–1991 Pavlos Diglis
- 2001–2016 Stavros Evagorou
- 2006–2021 Andreas Fakontis
- 1970–1991 Andreas Fantis
- 2008–present Yiannakis Gavriel
- 1991–2011 Aristophanes Georgiou
- 2011–2019 Giorgos Georgiou
- 1996–2009 Takis Hadjigeorgiou
- 2003–2011 Dinos Hadjinicolas
- 2011–present Christakis Jovanis
- 1991–present Nicos Katsourides
- 2011–present Andreas Kafkalias
- 2011–present Kostas Kosta
- 2008–present Skevi Koukouma Koutra
- 2001–present Andros Kyprianou
- 2006–2011 Pambis Kyritsis
- 2001–present Yiannos Lamaris
- 1996–2003 Giorgos Lillikas
- 2011–present Giorgos Loucaides
- 2008-2011 Klavdios Mavrohannas
- 2001–2006 Eleni Mavrou
- 2011–present Christos Mesis
- 2006–2011 Andreas Mouskalis
- 2011–2016 Pambos Papageorgiou
- 1960–1988 Ezekias Papaioannou
- 1985–1991 Michalis Papapetrou
- 1970–1991 Georgios Savvides
- 2006–present Panikkos Stavrianos
- 1996–2011 Yannakis Thoma
- 1960–1991 Andreas Ziartides

== AKEL MEPs ==
- 2004–2009 Adamos Adamou
- 2004–2014 Kyriacos Triantaphyllides
- 2009–2019 Takis Hadjigeorgiou
- 2014–2019 Neoklis Sylikiotis
- 2019–2024 Niyazi Kızılyürek
- 2019–present Giorgos K. Georgiou

== List of general secretaries ==
- 1936–1945 Ploutis Servas
- 1945–1949 Fifis Ioannou
- 1949–1988 Ezekias Papaioannou
- 1988–2009 Dimitris Christofias (6th President of the Republic of Cyprus)
- 2009–2021 Andros Kyprianou
- 2021–present Stefanos Stefanou
