= Mass media in Cyprus =

The mass media in Cyprus refers to mass media outlets based on the island of Cyprus, including both the Republic of Cyprus (RoC) and the Turkish Republic of Northern Cyprus (TRNC). Television, magazines, and newspapers are all operated by both state-owned and for-profit corporations which depend on advertising, subscription, and other sales-related revenues.

In the 2015 Freedom of the Press report of Freedom House, the Republic of Cyprus was ranked "free" and scored 25/100 in press freedom, 5/30 in Legal Environment, 11/40 in Political Environment, and 9/30 in Economic Environment (the lower scores the better). Reporters Without Borders rank the Republic of Cyprus 24th out of 180 countries in the 2015 World Press Freedom Index, with a score of 15.62.

== History ==
In the 1960–75 Cyprus, the media (owned by the government) were deemed not free. The power-sharing agreement among Turkish and Greek communities collapsed in 1963 after Makarios' attempt at pushing through Constitutional amendments. The Turkish community withdrew from the power-sharing agreements, and media remained under control of the Greek-dominated government.

The 1974 failed Greek coup triggered the Turkish military intervention and resulted in the division of the island. The partition removed the Turkish population from the Greek Cypriots' political sphere, and media controls were slowly relaxed. The editorial independence of the state-owned media (on the BBC model) was slowly reinforced in the 1976–77 period, when media in the Republic of Cyprus were deemed "partly free". Few small but free independent media outlets also emerged.

By 1977, governmental controls on the media in the Republic of Cyprus had been removed and the media started to be deemed "free". The 1989 Press Law allowed privatisation and reinforced journalists' protections.

== Legislative framework ==
Republic of Cyprus

The Constitution of Cyprus guarantees freedom of speech and of expression (art. 19):

«Every person has the right to freedom of speech and expression in any form. This right includes freedom to hold opinions and receive and impart information and ideas without interference by any public authority and regardless of frontiers.»

These are generally respected in practice by the government. The press of the Republic of Cyprus is seen as "vibrant" and does not shy from criticising authorities.

The 1989 RoC Press Law supports press freedom by guaranteeing the circulation of newspapers, journalists' right not to reveal sources, and public access to information. Libel and defamation are decriminalised and remain as civil offenses.

Cypriot and foreign journalists have the right to free access to state sources of information, freedom to seek and acquire information from any competent authority of the Republic and the freedom to make this public. Information can only be withhold for state or public security, constitutional or public order, public morals or the protection of the honour and rights of third parties.

Cyprus does not have a specific freedom of information (FOI) law (the only EU member state, with Spain, in such a condition), although a draft law was being prepared in late 2013.

Cypriot and foreign journalists have the right to protect their sources and not to give testimony without liability, unless when the published information concerns a criminal offence. In that case the journalist may be requirest to reveal her/his source, given that the information is clearly related to the criminal offence, it cannot be obtained otherwise, and there exist a superior and imperative public interest that require that the information be revealed.

A right to reply exists for persons, organisations or public institutions that are named or indirectly referred to in a report or article, if they consider it as untrue or misleading. Their reply must be published, free of charge, within three days of its receipt, giving it the same prominence as the initial report.

The law provides for freedom of speech and press, and the government generally respects these rights in practice. An independent press, an effective judiciary, and a functioning democratic political system combine to ensure freedom of speech and of the press. The law prohibits arbitrary interference with privacy, family, home, or correspondence, and the government generally respects these prohibitions in practice.

In 2015 a bill criminalizing denial of war crimes recognised by the Parliament (punished with prison terms of up to five years and a €10,000 fine) raised concerns (e.g. by the OSCE RFoM) about compliance with international freedom of expression standards.

Turkish Republic of Northern Cyprus

The law protects press freedom in the Turkish Republic of Northern Cyprus and internet access is not restricted. Some media institutions and journalists are openly critical of the government, independent media is active and expresses a wide variety of views. Some journalists have expressed concerns about privacy laws passed in 2014 that could potentially limit investigative journalism.

=== Status and self-regulation of journalists ===
Journalists, gathered in the Cyprus Union of Journalists, resort to self-regulation to address complaints about professional standards, based on a 1997 Code of Conduct and an Ethics Commission monitoring its implementation.

The Cyprus Media Complaints Commission (CMCC), established in May 1997, is a press council responsible for the self-regulation of the written and electronic news media, independent from government interference or judicial supervision.

== Media outlets ==
=== Print media ===
The print press in the Republic of Cyprus include 7 daily newspapers and 31 weeklies, often linked to political parties. As of 2009 there were 9 dailies with an average circulation of 100,000.

Daily newspapers include Alithia, Haravgi, Makhi, Phileleftheros, Politis, Simerini. Kypriaki has been discontinued. English-language press include the Cyprus Mail and the Cyprus Reporter (The Cyprus Times has been discontinued). The online press include CyprusNews.Live, CyprusNews.eu, onlycy, News in Cyprus, and Supermpala (sport magazine). Weeklies include Kathimerini (in Greek) and several English-language magazines: Cyprus Dialogue, Cyprus Observer, Cyprus Today, Cyprus Weekly, Financial Mirror.

EU citizens can issue print publications without restrictions or authorisations, only by registering before a District Court Registrar of the Republic, which forward it to the Press and Information Office (PIO), which issue a receipt. This is to be renewed in case of change of ownership. Non-EU citizens require a permit from the Minister of the Interior to publish a newspaper or a magazine in Cyprus. The permit is conditional and non-transferable, and may be revoked if the conditions are breached. Editorial and printing activities must be carried out in Cyprus.

In Northern Cyprus several local dailies in Turkish language are available, although mainland Turkish papers are generally preferred. Kıbrıs has by far the highest circulation. The U.S. Department of State reported in 2002 that there were opposition newspapers which often criticized the government. Northern Cyprus dailies include Afrika, Avrupa Demokrat Bakış, Detay, Diyalog, Haberdar, Halkın Sesi, Havadis, Kıbrıs, Kıbrıs Postası, Kıbrıslı, Realist, Star Kıbrıs, Vatan, Volkan, Yeni Düzen. Weeklies include Cümbez, Cyprus Dialogue, Cyprus Observer, Cyprus Today, Ekonomi, Star International, Yeniçağ.

=== Radio broadcasting ===
A mixture of state and privately run radio services; the public broadcaster operates 4 radio stations; in addition a number of private radio stations are available; in Northern Cyprus, there are 4 public radio stations as well as privately owned radio broadcast stations (2007).

Cyprus has a thriving radio landscape, with 93% of Greek Cypriots tuning in every day. Most stations broadcast in FM, and there's a mixture of state and private-run stations. This article lists all radio stations broadcasting in the southern part of Cyprus, and overviews the major stations broadcasting from the Northern Cyprus. The British sovereign military bases of Akrotiri and Dhekelia also operate radio transmitters. In addition to domestic broadcasts, Cyprus hosts international broadcast centres beaming content to the Middle East.

The Cyprus Broadcasting Corporation charter mandates a diverse radio programme with national coverage. It currently produces 4 radio programmes. The table below only includes high-power transmitters and omits low-power transmitters that serve as gap-fillers for areas with difficult reception.

Four medium wave stations broadcast to the Middle East from Cyprus. The BBC Arabic service transmitter is located at Zygi, Limassol. Another BBC MW transmitter is located within the sovereign bases area. The rest broadcast from Cape Greco, Famagusta. Although not the target audience, all stations can be received from within Cyprus.

When Turkish Cypriots withdrew from all official positions in the Republic of Cyprus in the aftermath of the intercommunal clashes in 1963–64, Bayrak assumed the role of the public broadcaster for the Turkish Cypriot enclaves first, and Northern Cyprus after 1974. It currently produces 6 radio programmes, on FM, MW and SW.

=== Television broadcasting ===
A mixture of state and privately run TV services; the RoC public broadcaster operates 2 TV channels; 6 private TV broadcasters, satellite and cable TV services including telecasts from Greece and Turkey are available; in Northern Cyprus, there are 2 public TV stations, and privately owned TV broadcast stations (2007).

Television in Cyprus was introduced in 1956. Private TV was introduced on 26 April 1992, by LOGOS TV which started its transmissions in STEREO and TELETEXT from day one. The first private TV station of Cyprus was owned and operated by the Church of Cyprus. In August 1995, the same station introduced the first ISP in Cyprus, LOGOSNET. The Republic of Cyprus currently uses the PAL colour system, and has converted terrestrial transmissions to digital on 1 July 2011, in line with EU policy. The analogue switch-off has led to several local TV stations shutting down for being unable to sustain the costs of compulsory nationwide digital transmission.

In 1978 BBC television filmed the drama series The Aphrodite Inheritance, starring Peter McEnery and Brian Blessed in Cyprus, and in 1999 the BBC again used the island to film the drama series Sunburn starring Michelle Collins.

Because of the political division of the island, television companies are also divided.

The Cyprus Broadcasting Corporation (CyBC, Greek: ΡΙΚ, Turkish: KRYK) is the state-funded broadcasting organization in the Republic of Cyprus, with three television channels and four radio stations, although there are also privately owned radio and TV stations.

Terrestrial digital transmission is now available in the Republic of Cyprus (parallel analogue transmissions ended on 1 July 2011). Satellite digital transmission is available through the NOVA Cyprus platform. Athina Sat, another provider, was launched in 2005 but ceased operations in 2008. CytaVision and PrimeTel both offer digital TV through IPTV transmission and Cablenet through its privately owned cable network (in certain urban areas).

Greek and Turkish mainland broadcasts are accessible throughout the island. A TV channel from the Greek state broadcaster, ERT, is available. The British Forces Broadcasting Service also operates radio and TV stations, although the TV signal is now confined to the Sovereign Base Areas or encrypted for copyright reasons.

Bayrak (BRT) is the state broadcaster of the Turkish Republic of Northern Cyprus. BRT is also the oldest Turkish Cypriot TV channel, established as a radio station in 1963, and launched its first television broadcast in 1976.

Bayrak Radio-TV operates three television channels (BRT 1, BRT 2 and BRT 3) [BRT 3 is used as a back up channel] and four radio stations. Several private television and radio stations also broadcast in Northern Cyprus, many of which rebroadcast programming from Turkey.

Most of the TV channels in Northern Cyprus also broadcast via satellite, and there is a "Cyprus Packet" in the satellite of Türksat.

=== Cinema ===
The most renowned Cypriot director to have worked abroad is Michael Cacoyannis.

Cypriot cinema was born much later than that of other countries. In the late 1960s and early 1970s, George Filis produced and directed Gregoris Afxentiou, Etsi Prodothike i Kypros (Cyprus Betrayal), and The Mega Document.

In 1994, cinematographic production received a boost with the establishment of the Cinema Advisory Committee. As of the year 2000, the annual amount set aside in the national budget stands at Cy Pounds 500,000 (about 850,000 Euros). In addition to government grants, Cypriot co-productions are eligible for funding from the Council of Europe's Eurimages Fund, which finances European film co-productions. To date, four feature-length films in which a Cypriot was executive producer have received funding from Eurimages. The first was I Sphagi tou Kokora (1992), completed in 1996, Hellados (And the Trains Fly to the Sky, 1995), which is currently in post-production, and Costas Demetriou's O Dromos gia tin Ithaki (The Road to Ithaka, 1997) which premiered in March 2000. The theme song to The Road to Ithaka was composed by Costas Cacoyannis and sung by Alexia Vassiliou. In September 1999, To Tama (The Promise) by Andreas Pantzis also received funding from the Eurimages Fund.

Only a small number of foreign films have been made in Cyprus. This includes Incense for the Damned, filmed in 1969 and starring Patrick Macnee, Patrick Mower and Peter Cushing. In 1970 The Beloved, starring Raquel Welch was also filmed in Cyprus, as was the 1973 British comedy movie Ghost in the Noonday Sun, directed by Peter Medak, starring Peter Sellers, Anthony Franciosa and Spike Milligan. Parts of the 1962 film The Longest Day, starring John Wayne were also filmed on Cyprus.

=== Internet ===
Internet penetration reached 65% in 2013, and there are no official restrictions.

ADSL is the most widespread broadband technology in Cyprus, is s available in most urban and sub-urban areas, with multiple providers offering packages that range from 512 kbit/s to 32 Mbit/s. Cable broadband is also available in some urban locations (Nicosia, Larnaca and Limassol) with speeds up to 100 Mbit/s. An ISP comparison website exists at the Cyprus Broadband portal. Many wireless networks are appearing in Cyprus, some with no minimum contract/pay as you go and others with a fixed contract.

== Media Organisations ==
=== Media agencies ===
- TAK-Cyprus, news agency (TRNC)

=== Trade unions ===
- Cyprus Union of Journalists
- Association of Newspapers and Periodicals Publishers
- The Owners of Electronic Mass Communication Media

=== Regulatory authorities ===
The Cyprus Telecommunication Authority manages most telecommunications and Internet connections on the island. However, following the liberalization of the telecommunications sector, private telecommunications companies registration properties have emerged.

== Media ownership ==
=== Transparency ===
Transparency of media ownership refers to the public availability of accurate, comprehensive and up-to-date information about media ownership structures. A legal regime guaranteeing transparency of media ownership makes possible for the public as well as for media authorities to find out who effectively owns, controls and influences the media as well as media influence on political parties or state bodies.

According to the Media Pluralism Monitor 2015, in Cyprus transparency of media ownership is a "grey area" as the public is not able to know who the actual owners of the country's media are. The general lack of transparency and accessibility of ownership data is an issue of concern for media freedom, pluralism and transparency in the country. The reason for this is the lack of specific and comprehensive legislative requirements for disclosing and making public information on media ownership.

In Cyprus it is not possible to identify the actual owners of media operating in the country neither through media-specific provisions nor through other non media-specific laws, such as the company laws in its requirements for transparency. The Press Law, which entered into force in 1989 and is largely based on Colonial British Law, is outdated and inoperative in many respects. Under the Press Law, print media are not obliged to disclose any crucial information concerning ownership, such as shareholders, beneficial owners or information on people holding indirect interests in the media outlet.

As for the broadcast media, under the Law on Radio and Television, they have to report much more information to the media regulator, namely the Cyprus Radio Television Authority. However, the law does not require the disclosure of crucial information for establishing ownership, in particular the exact size of shares held by each shareholder, information on beneficial ownership through brokerage or indirect ownership. As a consequence, those with higher and decisive size of shareholding cannot be identified. In addition, the regulator does not make available the data on the names of shareholders in its ownership and concentration report which is published every three years.

Under the Company Law a lot of information must be disclosed by all companies, including media registered as companies and this information is accessible to the public. However, in practice it is common in Cyprus to use nominee shareholders. Therefore, as Cypriot law protects the anonymity of the beneficial owners, the ultimate owner cannot be easily identified.

=== Concentration ===
According to the Media Pluralism Monitor concentration of media ownership poses a medium risk, while concentration of cross-media ownership poses a low risk.

==== Legal framework ====
The Law on Radio and Television Organisations 7(I)/1998 provides rules against media ownership concentrations involving television and radio stations.

As for monomedia ownership. No shareholder (including relatives up to second grade and spouse) can control more than 25% of the shares of the company of (national or local) TV station and of a national radio station. No shareholder (including relatives up to second grade and spouse) can control more than 40% of the shares of the company of local radio station. One can hold share in more than one station but a company cannot control more than 25% of another company, even indirectly.

Rules about crossmedia concentration were modified by Law 134(I)/2000. Roughly, if one -or one's relatives up to second grade or their spouse- controls more than 5% of a media company he or she cannot be granted another licence for a radio or television station.

Changes in shareholding are controlled strictly by the media regulator and by the Competition Commission. No ownership rules and ownership monitoring agency exist in the press and internet media sector.

==== Practice ====
In practice, because of the problem with transparency, true owners are not always known, and rules about concentration are not always enforced. Data about market shares are not publicly available. Accurate data on media audience share are not available, neither.

The public broadcasting service is Cyprus Broadcasting Corporation. The independence of its governance and funding poses a high risk, because of the governing body appointment mechanism and political interference in the budget approval process.

== Censorship and media freedom ==
In 2010, the US Department of State reported that the law provided for freedom of speech and of the press, and the government generally respected these rights in practice. The UNHCR also reported in 2006 that the freedom of press was generally respected, and independent press often criticized the authorities.

The World Press Freedom Index ranked Cyprus 45 in 2007, 31 in 2008, 25 in 2009, and ranked it back down to 45 in 2010.

In 2008, the OSCE in a report written by the Turkish Cypriot Human Rights Foundation and the Turkish Cypriot Journalists' Union reported that the government of the Republic of Cyprus were violating the rights of Turkish Cypriots on the freedom of press. It added that the change in Cyprus Broadcasting Corporation's broadcasting frequency prevented many Turkish Cypriot TV channels broadcasting in Northern Cyprus, thus violating the freedom of the speech.

The government of Northern Cyprus has been reported as hostile to independent journalists. Several attacks were reported in 2011. Since 2013 the government of mainland Turkey has step up the pressure over TRNC editors and journalists to tone down those reports that are critical of Ankara. New TRNC privacy laws (passed in March 2015) are also at risk of limiting investigative journalism and sharing of information.

=== Attacks and threats against journalists ===
No major episodes of attacks on journalists or harassment have been recorded in Cyprus in the last few years.

- In 1996 Kutlu Adali, journalist for the Northern Cypriot newspaper Yeni Düzen, was fatally shot outside his home after he had announced he was going to reveal information about the Turkish settlement policy in Northern Cyprus. His assassination remains "a dark chapter" in TRNC's history, but no other such incidents followed.
- On 24 May 2001 a bomb explosion damaged the premises of the independent daily newspaper Avrupa in northern Cyprus. The daily had already been harassed by the local authorities the previous year.
- On 6 May 2004 three bombs exploded during the night at TRNC daily Kıbrıs newspaper in the north of Nicosia. Nobody was injured.
- On 18 July 2005, the police used excessive force against demonstrators and journalists at a picket by striking lorry drivers.
- On 5 April 2011 Mutlu Esendemir, editor of television station Kanal T in Nicosia in Northern Cyprus, suffered leg injuries when a bomb exploded as he was opening the door of his car.
- On 3 July 2011 Şener Levent, editor-in-chief of Afrika newspaper in northern Cyprus, suffered an attempted murder when an armed men entered the press room and shot at a newspaper's employee. Levent is critical of the TRNC policies and the Turkish military's presence on the island, and Turkish nationalist groups were accused for the action
- On 15 July 2015 Russian journalist Andrey Nekrasov was arrested in Cyprus and risked extradition back to Russia, that he had fled to avoid a trial for his activity. He was later granted political asylum in Lithuania.
- In September 2016 a car, belonging to crime reporter Dina Kleanthous of the news website Reporter Online, was burned. She had previously been threatened.

=== Political interferences ===
- In 2007, then President Tassos Papadopoulos "personally intervened" to force the dismissal of the press attaché at the Cyprus High Commission in London, Soteris Georgallis, because he had attended to a book presentation which was addressed by a critic of Papadopoulos, Takis Hadjidemetriou. Kyriakos Pierides reported in 2007 that the "pro-government political and commercial pressures are a constant factor inhibiting the work of the media there".
- In September 2012 the TRNC government investigated the publication of documents critical of the prime minister by the Afrika daily.
- In April 2013 Sigma TV cut without warning a section of a rebroadcast comedy program hosted by Greek comedian Lakis Lazopoulos, where he made reference to the new President Anastasiades.
- On New Year's Eve 2014, CyBC aired Christofias' 2009 message to the nation rather than Anastasiades' 2014. It is unclear if it was a technical error or a political sabotage.
- On 30 August 2015 the Turkish military forces in Cyprus accused the TRNC daily Afrika of being against "the army and the flag" and having made "people alienated from the army". Afrika editor-in-chief Sener Levent and writer Mahmut Anayasa, both of whom had shared an Afrika article from July on social media, were called to the prosecutor's office for questioning.

=== Civil defamation lawsuits ===
In April 2013 the former President Demetris Christofias sued for the libel the state broadcaster CyBC and its head of news, Yiannis Kareklas. The case concerned the comments on Christofias made by Anastasiades (later to become the next President). Anastasiades retracted the comments.

=== Censorship and self-censorship ===
- In 2004, the media was stifled by the government of the Republic of Cyprus to broadcast programmes against the Annan Plan for Cyprus. European Commissioner Günter Verheugen was refused to air-time on any Greek Cypriot TV channel because if he was not refused, he would present arguments supporting the plan.
- Cyprus underwent a tough financial crisis and a heated political debate in 2013, fostering censorship and self-censorship in the media concerning politically controversial topics. Despite deeply unpopular developments, including an EU/IMF bailout deal that required closing the second biggest bank and use uninsured deposits over €100,000 to cover the bail-in, the response of the Cypriot media was deemed by Freedom House as "generally muted".
- In February 2013 a TV ad by the Pancypriot Citizens' Movement against the consequences of the bailout agreement was blocked from airing by the Radio-Television Authority, as it was deemed speculative and targeting a candidate in the upcoming election.
- A 2014 US Department of State report about Northern Cyprus stated that "journalists were at times obstructed in their reporting or practiced self-censorship for fear of losing their jobs in connection with investigating a story", often due to the bias of media owners.

=== Expulsions and extradition ===
- In January 2011 a Kurdish-Turkish journalist was expelled back to Turkey by the TRNC authorities together with his family.
- In July 2015 a Russian journalists, who was seeking asylum in the Republic of Cyprus, risked being extradited back to Russia, where he would have faced up to 15 years of jail.

=== Internet censorship and surveillance ===
There are no government restrictions on access to the Internet or reports that the government monitored e-mail or Internet chat rooms without appropriate legal authority. Individuals and groups engage in the peaceful expression of views via the Internet, including e‑mail.

== See also ==
- Human rights in Cyprus#Freedom of press and speech
- Access to public information in Cyprus
