= Mass media in Northern Cyprus =

TV, magazines, and newspapers are all operated by both state-owned and for-profit corporations which depend on advertising, subscription, and other sales-related revenues.

The law protects press freedom in the Turkish Republic of Northern Cyprus and internet access is not restricted. Some media institutions and journalists are openly critical of the government, independent media is active and expresses a wide variety of views. Some journalists have expressed concerns about privacy laws passed in 2014 that could potentially limit investigative journalism.

Northern Cyprus is ranked 91st out of 180 countries in the 2025 World Press Freedom Index of Reporters Without Borders (RSF).

== Print media ==
Several local dailies in Turkish language are available, although mainland Turkish papers are generally preferred. Kıbrıs has by far the highest circulation. The U.S. Department of State reported in 2002 that there were opposition newspapers which often criticized the government. Northern Cyprus dailies include Afrika, Avrupa Demokrat Bakış, Detay, Diyalog, Haberdar, Halkın Sesi, Havadis, Kıbrıs, Kıbrıs Postası, Kıbrıslı, Realist, Star Kıbrıs, Vatan, Volkan, Yeni Düzen. Weeklies include Cümbez, Cyprus Dialogue, Cyprus Observer, Cyprus Today, Ekonomi, Star International, Yeniçağ.

== Radio broadcasting ==
By 2007, there were 4 public radio stations as well as privately owned radio broadcast stations.

After the intercommunal clashes in 1963-1964, Bayrak assumed the role of the public broadcaster for the Turkish Cypriots. It currently produces 6 radio programmes, on FM, MW and SW.

== Television broadcasting ==
There are 2 public TV stations, and privately owned TV broadcast stations (2007).

Turkish mainland broadcasts are accessible throughout the island.

Bayrak (BRT) is the state television of Northern Cyprus. BRT is also the oldest Turkish Cypriot TV channel, established as a radio station in 1963, and launched its first television broadcast in 1976.

Bayrak Radio-TV operates two television channels (BRT 1 and BRT 2) and four radio stations. Several private television and radio stations also broadcast in Northern Cyprus.

Most of the TV channels in Northern Cyprus also broadcast via satellite, and there is a "Cyprus Packet" in the satellite of Türksat.

== Internet ==
ADSL is the most widespread broadband technology in Northern Cyprus.

== Media organisations ==
=== Media agencies ===
- TAK-Cyprus, news agency (TRNC)

=== Trade unions ===
- Cyprus Turkish Journalists Union
- Association of Newspapers and Periodicals Publishers
- The Owners of Electronic Mass Communication Media

== Censorship and media freedom ==
In 2015, "Freedom of Expression and Belief" score of Northern Cyprus is 14/16 according to Freedom House.

The World Press Freedom Index ranked Northern Cyprus 83rd in 2014, 76th in 2015 among 180 countries.

In 2008, the OSCE in a report written by the Turkish Cypriot Human Rights Foundation and the Turkish Cypriot Journalists’ Union reported that the government of the Republic of Cyprus were violating the rights of Turkish Cypriots on the freedom of press. It added that the change in Cyprus Broadcasting Corporation's broadcasting frequency prevented many Turkish Cypriot TV channels broadcasting in Northern Cyprus, thus violating the freedom of the speech.

New TRNC privacy laws (passed in March 2015) are at risk of limiting investigative journalism and sharing of information.

=== Attacks and threats against journalists ===
- In 1996 Kutlu Adali, journalist for the Turkish Cypriot newspaper Yeni Düzen, was fatally shot outside his home after he had announced he was going to reveal information about the Turkish settlement policy in Northern Cyprus. His assassination remains "a dark chapter" in TRNC's history, but no other such incidents followed.
- On 24 May 2001 a bomb explosion damaged the premises of the independent daily newspaper Avrupa in Northern Cyprus. The daily had already been harassed by the local authorities the previous year.
- On 6 May 2004 three bombs exploded during the night at TRNC daily Kıbrıs newspaper in the north of Nicosia. Nobody was injured.
- On 18 July 2005, the police used excessive force against demonstrators and journalists at a picket by striking lorry drivers.
- On 5 April 2011 Mutlu Esendemir, editor of television station Kanal T in Nicosia in Northern Cyprus, suffered leg injuries when a bomb exploded as he was opening the door of his car.
- On 3 July 2011 Şener Levent, editor-in-chief of Afrika newspaper in northern Cyprus, suffered an attempted murder when an armed men entered the press room and shot at a newspaper's employee. Levent is critical of the TRNC policies and the Turkish military's presence on the island, and Turkish nationalist groups were accused for the action

=== Political interferences ===
- In September 2012 the Turkish Cypriot government investigated the publication of documents critical of the prime minister by the Afrika daily.
- On 30 August 2015 the Turkish military forces in Cyprus accused the TRNC daily Afrika of being against "the army and the flag" and having made "people alienated from the army". Afrika editor-in-chief Sener Levent and writer Mahmut Anayasa, both of whom had shared an Afrika article from July on social media, were called to the prosecutor's office for questioning.

=== Censorship and self-censorship ===
- A 2014 US Department of State report about Northern Cyprus stated that "journalists were at times obstructed in their reporting or practiced self-censorship for fear of losing their jobs in connection with investigating a story", often due to the bias of media owners.

=== Expulsions and extradition ===
- In January 2011 a Kurdish-Turkish journalist was expelled back to Turkey by the TRNC authorities together with his family.

== See also ==
- Human rights in Northern Cyprus#Freedom of press and speech
