= List of newspapers in Northern Cyprus =

This is a list of newspapers in Northern Cyprus. There are a number of daily newspapers in Northern Cyprus, and they are all in Turkish. Kıbrıs has by far the highest circulation. The U.S. Department of State reported in 2002 that there were opposition newspapers which often criticized the government.

== Daily ==
- Avrupa
- Diyalog
- Kıbrıs
- Kıbrıs Postası
- Star Kıbrıs
- Yeni Düzen
- Havadis
- Yeni Bakış

== Weekly ==
- Cyprus Observer
- Cyprus Today
- Star International
- Yeniçağ

== Online ==
- Kıbrıs Postası
- Gazeddakibris
- Özgür Gazete

== See also ==
- List of newspapers
- Media of Cyprus
- Ziligurti
