= List of newspapers in Cyprus =

This is a list of newspapers in the Republic of Cyprus. See also: List of newspapers in Northern Cyprus

== Daily newspapers ==
=== Greek language ===
- Alithia
- Haravgi
- Makhi
- Phileleftheros
- Politis
- Simerini

=== English language ===
- Cyprus Mail

=== Discontinued ===
- The Cyprus Times

== Weekly ==
=== Greek language ===
- Kathimerini
- CyprusNews.Live

=== English language ===
- Cyprus Observer
- Cyprus Today
- Cyprus Weekly
- Financial Mirror

== See also ==
- List of newspapers
- List of newspapers in Northern Cyprus
- Media of Cyprus
