= Elections in Northern Cyprus =

Elections in Northern Cyprus are organized to elect governments, presidents and representatives of local administrative bodies in Northern Cyprus, known as the Turkish Republic of Northern Cyprus.

== Electoral system ==
The presidency, which is served in five-year terms, was instituted with TRNC's first presidential election in 1985 and continued with the elections of 1990, 1995, 2000, 2005, 2010, 2015, 2020, 2025 and with the next election scheduled for 2030. The legislature, Cumhuriyet Meclisi (Assembly of the Republic of Northern Cyprus), has 50 members, elected for a five-year term by mitigated proportional representation. The territory has a multi-party system, with two or three strong parties and another party which is also electorally successful.

In the presidential election, a candidate must obtain at least 50% of the votes in order to secure a first-ballot victory. Upon failing to do so, the two top candidates compete in a runoff election, with the winner assuming the presidency.

The mitigated proportional representation system in use for legislative elections obligates each party to cross the 5% of the total vote election threshold in order to be seated in the 50-member parliament, which is chosen from five districts: Lefkoşa, Gazimağusa, Girne, Güzelyurt, İskele and Lefke.

In the parliamentary elections, voters choose individual candidates with two options in the manner of voting: a party-line vote which, in effect, means a vote for each candidate from that party in that election district or, alternatively, the voter may choose different MP candidates from various parties. In this type of mixed voting, the voter may not choose more than the number of MPs from that district.

Residents of Northern Cyprus are eligible to stand for election and vote in the national elections of the Republic of Cyprus, but not able to run for presidency (the Constitution states that a Turkish-Cypriot should be vice-president of the Republic). Turkish Cypriot communal representation in the Republic of Cyprus government de facto ended in 1963. Until 2004, the case of Ibrahim Aziz in the European Court of Human Rights, Turkish Cypriots could not vote in the Republic of Cyprus.

== Latest elections ==
=== 2020 Northern Cypriot presidential election ===
Candidate	Party	First round		Second round	
Candidate	Party	Votes	%	Votes	%
Ersin Tatar	National Unity Party	35,825	32.35	67,322	51.69
Mustafa Akıncı	Independent	33,053	29.84	62,910	48.31
Tufan Erhürman	Republican Turkish Party	24,008	21.68		
Kudret Özersay	Independent	6,356	5.74		
Erhan Arıklı	Rebirth Party	5,937	5.36		
Serdar Denktaş	Independent	4,653	4.20		
Fuat Türköz Çiner	Nationalist Democracy Party	327	0.30		
Arif Salih Kırdağ	Independent	282	0.25		
Alpan Uz	Independent	156	0.14		
Ahmet Boran	Independent	83	0.07		
Mustafa Ulaş	Independent	69	0.06		
Total		110,749	100.00	130,232	100.00
Valid votes		110,749	95.66	130,232	97.24
Invalid/blank votes		5,027	4.34	3,699	2.76
Total votes		115,776	100.00	133,931	100.00
Registered voters/turnout		198,867	58.22	199,029	67.29
Source: Kibris Online, Kibris Online

=== 2022 Northern Cypriot parliamentary election ===
Party	Votes	%	+/–	Seats	+/–
National Unity Party	1,971,400	39.54	+3.93	24	+3
Republican Turkish Party	1,597,137	32.04	+11.09	18	+6
Democratic Party	369,239	7.41	–0.41	3	0
People's Party	333,090	6.68	–10.39	3	–6
Rebirth Party	318,763	6.39	–0.60	2	0
Communal Democracy Party	220,610	4.42	–4.23	0	–3
Independence Path	97,575	1.96	New	0	New
Communal Liberation Party New Forces	76,902	1.54	–	0	0
Independents	827	0.02	–0.11	0	0
Total	4,985,543	100.00	–	50	0
Total votes	117,421	–			
Registered voters/turnout	203,792	57.62			
Source: BRTK

=== Presidential elections ===
Date:	Candidates:	Party Affiliation:	% Vote:	Notes:
15 April 2000	Mustafa Akıncı; Mehmet A. Talat; Arif Hasan T. Desem; Derviş Eroğlu; Ayhan Kaymak; Rauf R. Denktas; Sener Levent; Turgut Afsaroglu	TKP; CTP; YBH; UBP; Independent; Independent; Independent; Independent	%11.70 %10.03 %2.60 %30.14 %0.38 %43.67 %0.92 %0.56	1- Number of registered voters: 126675; 2-Participation Rate: %81.02; 3-Derviş Eroğlu and Rauf R. Denktas was to run for the second round, but Derviş Eroğlu had forfeited so the second round did not take place
15 Feb 1995				1- 1st round of 1995presidential elections.
22 April 1995				1- 2nd round of 1995 presidential elections.
22 April 1990				1- 1st round of 1990 presidential elections.
9 June 1985				1- 1st round of 1985 presidential elections.
28 June 1981				1- 1st round of 1981 presidential elections.

=== Parliamentary elections ===
Date:	Parties:	% Votes:	Seats:	+/-	Notes:
20 Feb 2005	CTP – Cumhuriyetçi Turk Partisi; UBP – Ulusal Birlik Partisi; DP – Demokrat Parti; BDH – Baris ve Demokrasi Hareketi; TKP – Toplumcu Kurtuluş Partisi; YP – New Party; MAP – Milli Adalet Partisi	%44.5 %31.7 %13.5 %5.8 %2.4 %1.6 %0.5	24; 19; 6; 1 - - -	+5 +1 -1 -5 - - -	1- (+/-) – Difference in seats from 2003 election.
14 Dec 2003	CTP – Cumhuriyetçi Turk Partisi; UBP – Ulusal Birlik Partisi; BDH – Baris ve Demokrasi Hareketi; DP – Demokrat Parti	% 35.18 % 32.93 % 13.14% %12.93	19; 18; 6; 7		1- TKP entered the elections under the list of BDH.
6 Dec 1998	UBP – Ulusal Birlik Partisi; DP – Demokrat Parti; TKP – Toplumcu Kurtuluş Partisi; CTP – Cumhuriyetçi Turk Partisi; Others	%40.4 %22.6 %15.4 %13.4 % 8.2	24; 13; 7; 6 -		1- Others includes UDP, BP, YBH
12 Dec 1993	UBP – Ulusal Birlik Partisi; DP – Demokrat Parti; CTP – Cumhuriyetçi Turk Partisi; TKP – Toplumcu Kurtuluş Partisi; Others (YKP, MMP, BEP)	%29.8 %29.2 %24.2 %13.3 % 3.5	17; 15; 13; 5 -		1-Early General Elections; 2- Others include YKP, MMP, BEP
13 Oct 1991	UBP – Ulusal Birlik Partisi; Free Democratic Party (HDP); Others (YKP)	%67.1 %13.9 %19	11; 1 -		1- Interim elections done to fill the seats of 12 MPs who had resigned. 2- CTP and TKP boycotted the election. 3-Others include SDP, MAP, BEP, YDP
6 May 1990	UBP – Ulusal Birlik Partisi; Democratic Struggle Party (DMP); Others (YKP)	%54.7 %44.5 %0.8	34; 16 -		1- DMP is an election alliance party for CTP, TKP, YDP.
23 Jun 1985	UBP – Ulusal Birlik Partisi; CTP – Cumhuriyetçi Turk Partisi; TKP – Toplumcu Kurtuluş Partisi; YDP – Yeni Dogus Partisi (YDP); Others	%36.7 %21.4 %15.8 %8.8 %17.3	24; 12; 10; 4 -		Others include TAP, SDP, DHP

In 2009 President Mehmet Ali Talat claimed that in 1990 and 1998 Turkish government officials along with other influential powers from Turkey interfered with the Parliamentary Elections.

== See also ==
- Mass media in Northern Cyprus
