= 2015 Northern Cypriot presidential election =

- 19 April 2015 (first round); 26 April 2015 (second round)
- Turnout: 62.35% (first round), 64.12% (second round)
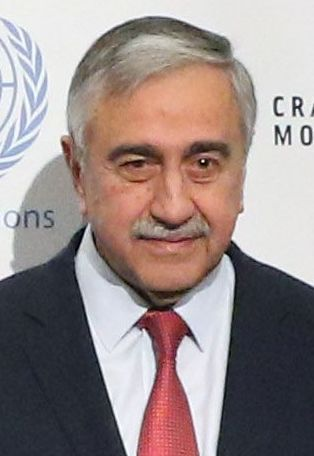

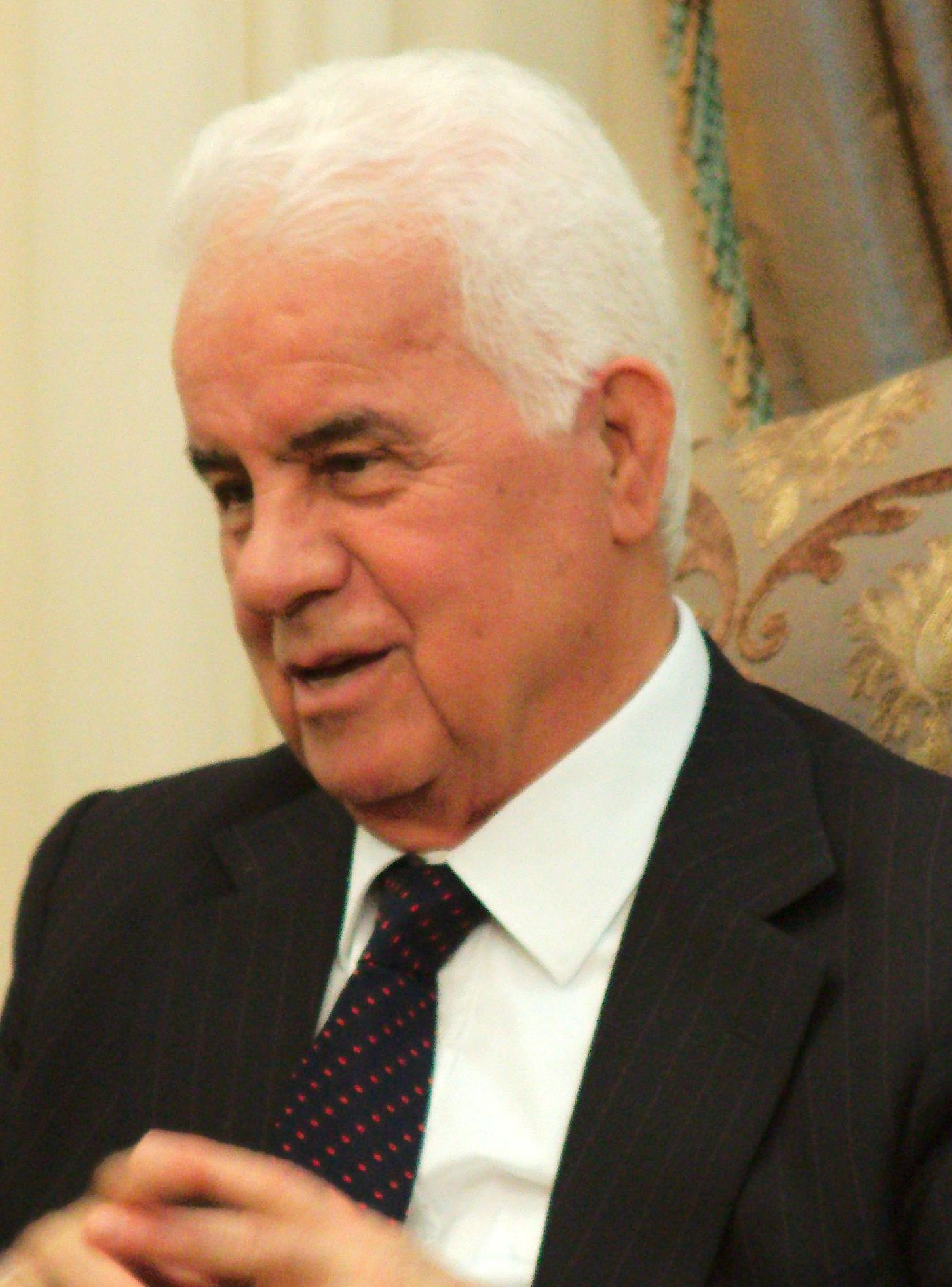
Candidate	Mustafa Akıncı	Derviş Eroğlu
Party	Independent	Independent
Popular vote	67,032	43,763
Percentage	60.50%	39.50%
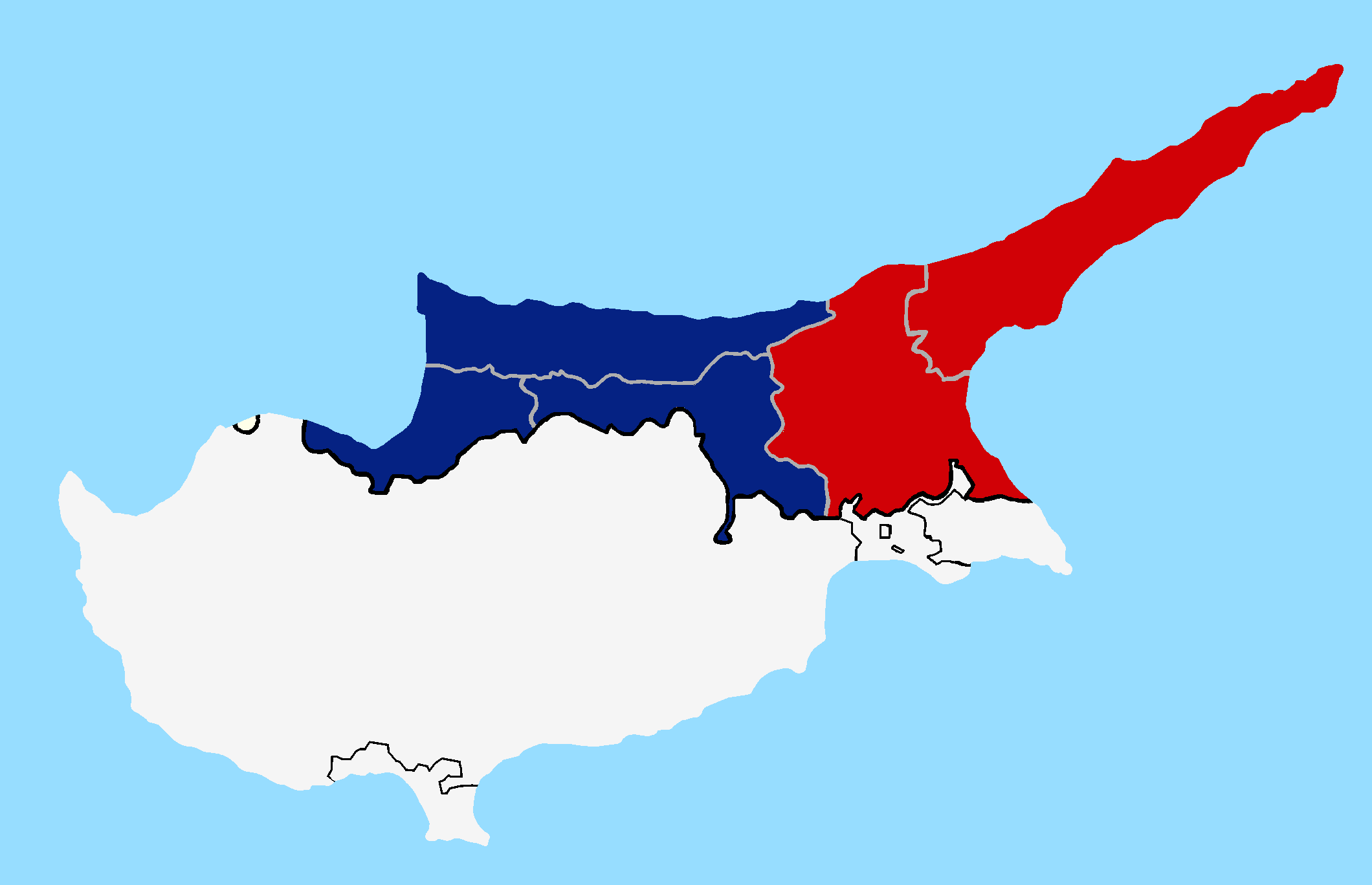
- First round results by district (red for Eroğlu, blue for Akıncı)
President before election
Derviş Eroğlu
Independent
President-elect
Mustafa Akıncı
Independent

Presidential elections were held in Northern Cyprus in April 2015. In the first round on 19 April incumbent president and independent candidate Derviş Eroğlu and independent candidate Mustafa Akıncı progressed to the second round. The second round took place on 26 April and was won by Akıncı.

The results of the election were considered to be a major upset of power by the mainstream Turkish Cypriot media. The other major candidates of the election, who failed to progress to the second round were Sibel Siber, the candidate of the Republican Turkish Party, which headed the government at the time of the election, and Kudret Özersay, an independent candidate with no political history. Siber's failure to progress to the second round led to shock and controversy in her party and Prime Minister Özkan Yorgancıoğlu announced that he would be stepping down in the upcoming party congress. Özersay's share of the votes was seen as a major surprise success. Eroğlu announced his withdrawal from political life following the election.

== Electoral system ==
The President is elected using the two-round system: as no candidate received a majority in the first round, a run-off was held seven days later. The role of the president is not symbolic: the President has a role in the executive branch of the government and represents Northern Cyprus in international politics, especially regarding the Cyprus dispute and the peace talks.

== Candidates ==
- Derviş Eroğlu – incumbent President of Northern Cyprus; independent candidate, supported by the National Unity Party and the Democratic Party
- Sibel Siber – Speaker of the TRNC Parliament and candidate of the Republican Turkish Party
- Mustafa Akıncı – Independent candidate, supported by the Communal Democracy Party and the United Cyprus Party
- Kudret Özersay – Independent candidate
- Mustafa Onurer – Cyprus Socialist Party candidate
- Arif Salih Kırdağ – Independent
- Mustafa Ulaş – Independent

== Campaign ==
=== Akıncı ===
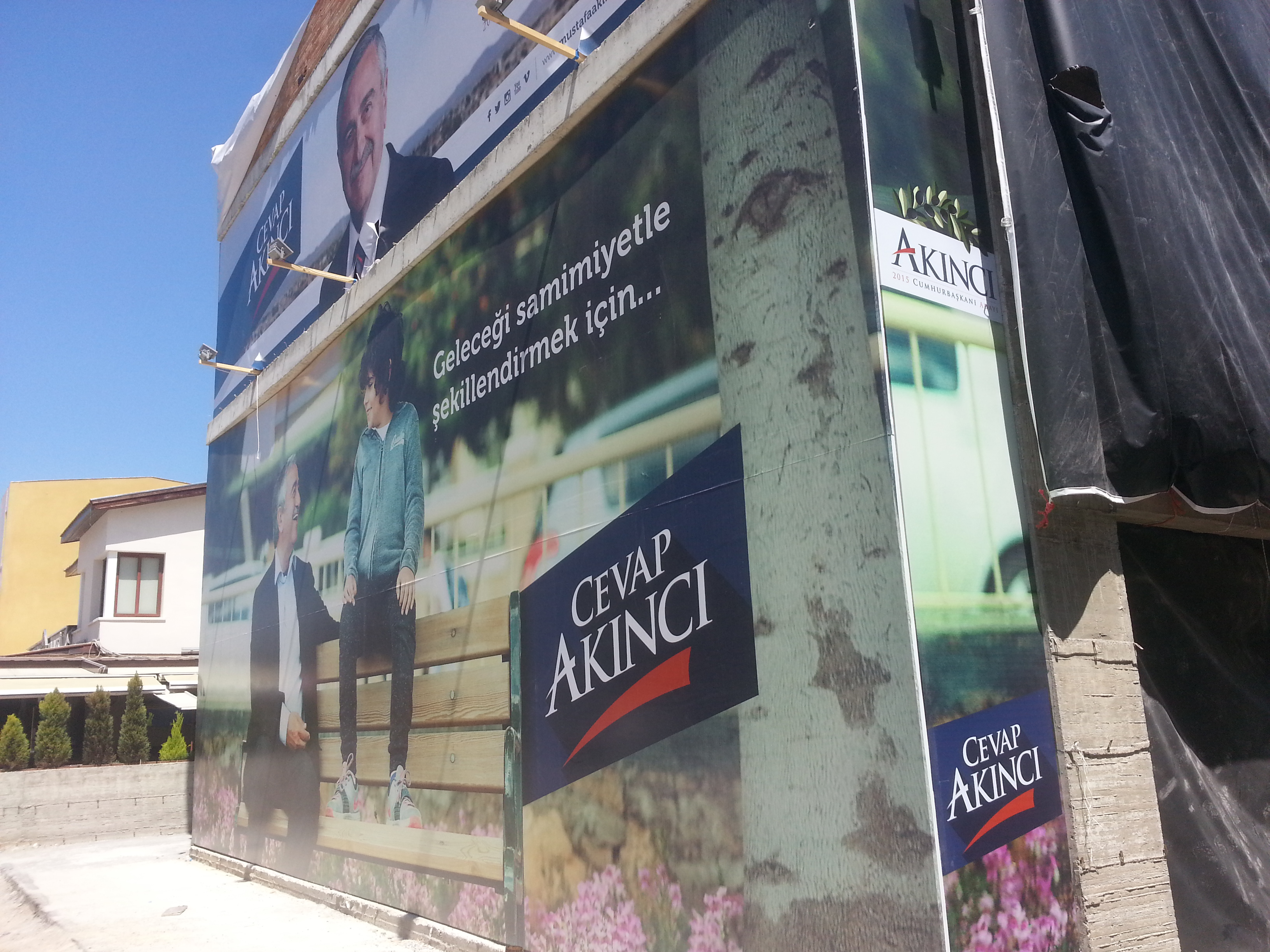
Poster promoting Mustafa Akıncı in Dereboyu Avenue, Northern Nicosia

Akıncı, who ran as an independent, is a member of the pro-Union Communal Democracy Party. He is described as a "leftist moderate" who would "push harder for a peace deal". In terms of the specific negotiations, he stated that he would oppose "submissiveness" on the Turkish Cypriot side in the Turkish-Turkish Cypriot relations and said that the relationship should be "fraternal" and that the Turkish Cypriots should be able to "stand up on their own feet". Akıncı promised a vision about the ghost town of Varosha favoring a settlement to the issue by saying, "Instead of living side by side a corpse let Varosha become a lively city where people live, contractors from both communities do business together and young people can find jobs".

He proposed and endorsed formulas to enable Turkish Cypriot participation in international sports events, projects to establish a common mobile phone network on both sides of Cyprus, opening of checkpoints in Lefka (Aplıç) and Famagusta (Derinya) and continuation of bi-communal projects of renovation of historical places. Regarding his vision for Varosha, he elaborated that the quarter should be opened to public under United Nations administration in a way that would "benefit both communities". He expressed his vehement opposition to any discrimination against LGBT individuals. He also promised to bring women to the table of negotiations if he elected, and said that communal gender equality should be a "way of life".

Akıncı held his Nicosia rally on 14 April. The rally was attended by "thousands" and was "marked by spaces reserved for the elderly and the disabled", according to news reports. Akıncı refuted the proposition that change should be brought about by youths or women, claiming that change comes with ideas, and said that the neutrality of a president should not be perceived as a lack of principles.

Upon Akıncı's progression to the second round, the Republican Turkish Party, headed by Prime Minister Özkan Yorgancıoğlu, announced that they would endorse him.

=== Eroğlu ===
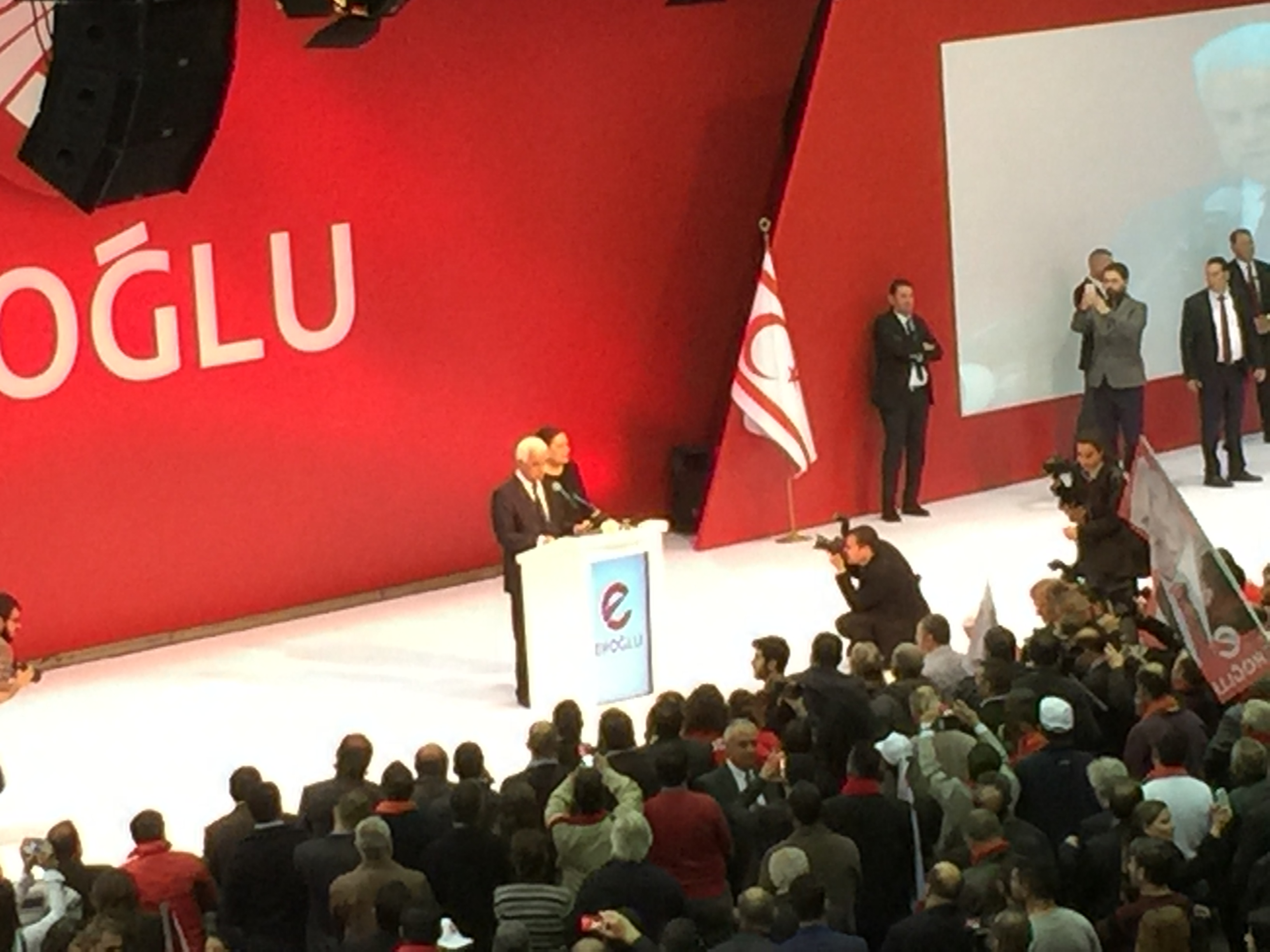
Eroğlu's initial rally to start off his campaign in Nicosia

Eroğlu began his election campaign on 28 February 2015, in a rally of thousands of supporters in the Atatürk Sports Hall in North Nicosia. Serdar Denktaş of the Democratic Party was also present at the rally, signifying his party's support for Eroğlu. Eroğlu put his aim in the election at 55%, promised to follow the path drawn by Rauf Denktaş, the founder of Northern Cyprus, claimed that his previous five years of presidency were successful and that he would strive to keep Turkey's guarantee on Cyprus. He also said that he would not allow anyone to "differentiate one TRNC citizen from the other".

At the beginning of March, Eroğlu claimed that his experience in politics since 1976, his trustworthiness and belief in the Turkish Republic of Northern Cyprus as a state made him an ideal candidate. He claimed that it was an election "unlike any other", but that there was actually peace in Cyprus and that what is needed is a treaty to finalize it. He promised to solve the Cyprus dispute within two years of his re-election.

Eroğlu pointed out to his establishment of a People's Council to receive public opinion regarding the Cyprus problem, and promised the establishment of a Women's Council and a Youth Council to gather public opinion not only about the negotiations, but also about other communal issues. However, he stated that he did not think that the lack of representation of women as negotiators had been a factor in the lack of solution in Cyprus, and blamed the Greek Cypriot side as a "block" against a fair solution. He claimed that the Greek Cypriots did not approach a fair solution because they wanted to keep "abusing" the title of the Republic of Cyprus that they "usurped" unilaterally.

On 13 March, Eroğlu made his official application for presidency as an independent candidate and was declared a provisional candidate by the High Election Committee, with his official candidacy declared on 23 March. Eroğlu stated that the aim of his candidacy was to find a final settlement for the Cyprus dispute, for which he claimed that the next two years would be crucial. He announced that his aim was to win the election without a runoff.

Eroğlu held his Famagusta rally in the Namık Kemal Square on 15 April; the rally was attended by people from Famagusta, İskele and the Karpass Peninsula. He attacked other candidates regarding the issue of Varosha, saying that opening the area under Turkish Cypriot jurisdiction would end the negotiations, and opening the area under the United Nations would amount to "handing over Famagusta". His Nicosia rally was held on 17 April in the Sarayönü Square. The rally was attended by "thousands" who came from Nicosia, Morphou and Kyrenia, and Eroğlu said that "the victory [would] belong to those who believe in the TRNC, in freedom and in sovereignty". He said that he was asking for duty "one last time".

=== Siber ===
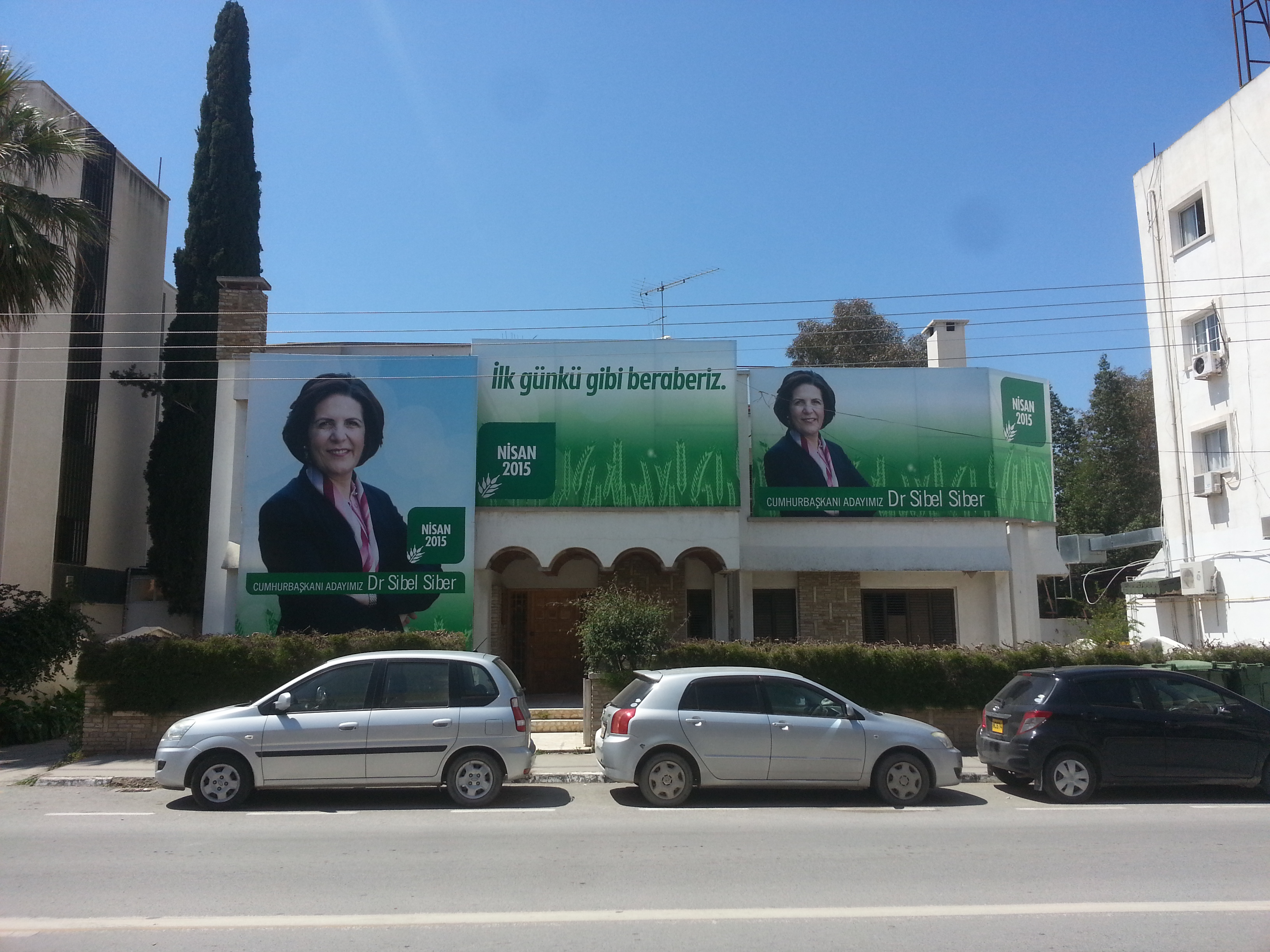
Posters promoting Sibel Siber in Dereboyu Avenue, Nicosia

Sibel Siber, who would have been the first ever woman President of Northern Cyprus if elected, stated on 23 February that, if elected, she would ensure the recommencement of the negotiations to solve the Cyprus dispute. She promised that "working desks" would be formed in the presidency to solve the problems in the Turkish Cypriot community, and that she saw the president as a figure who must be actively involved in communal affairs. She referred to her previous term as the prime minister, claiming that she would pursue the same policy of openness, transparency and trust that she did during her term as prime minister.

On 13 March, Siber made her official application for presidency as the candidate of the Republican Turkish Party (CTP) and was declared a provisional candidate by the High Election Committee, with her official candidacy declared on 23 March. On the same day, the head of women's branch of the CTP called Siber "the first female candidate close to winning the election" and called for Turkish Cypriot women to unite behind her.

On 17 April, Siber held her Nicosia rally in the İnönü Square. She told that if she was elected, the country would "head towards a common future", including those that had been displaced from the south and had come from the Turkish mainland after 1974, and that "the outdated mentality would become history". Prime Minister Özkan Yorgancıoğlu, former president Mehmet Ali Talat and former prime minister Ferdi Sabit Soyer also spoke in the rally, and Talat claimed that they would win the election in the first round.

=== Özersay ===
During his campaign, Özersay promised that if elected president, he would not only follow an active diplomatic policy in the negotiations, but also combat the "rife partisanship and nepotism" in politics, which he claimed was a role neglected using the peace process as a pretext. He claimed that the public had "disowned state institutions due to injustice" and that he would be scrupulous in allowing assignments of public officials to "start solving the problems".

Upon his failure to progress to the second round, Özersay made a statement claiming that he had been the subject of a campaign of defamation during the campaign, and that polls were manipulated against him. He stated that he had not even called for citizens to vote for him, but rather to "choose for themselves" and thus announced that he would not endorse any other candidate in the second round. He said that this would not be his last election, but that he would not establish a political party.

== Opinion polls ==
A March 2015 survey conducted by the Gezici Research Company predicted that Eroğlu would take the lead in the first round with 37.2% of the popular vote, but would lose to Akıncı in the second round, by a margin of 21%. 21.1% of respondents said that they would vote for Siber and 11.4% for Özersay. 3,072 voters were consulted.

== Conduct ==
On 19 April, the media was not allowed to make any comments or relay any unauthorized election results until 19:00 on the election day. Violations resulted in the newspapers Detay, Kıbrıs Postası and Afrika, all of which had quotations from social networking websites, being pulled off the shelf by the authorities and the channel Ada TV being banned from broadcasting until 19:00.

== Results ==
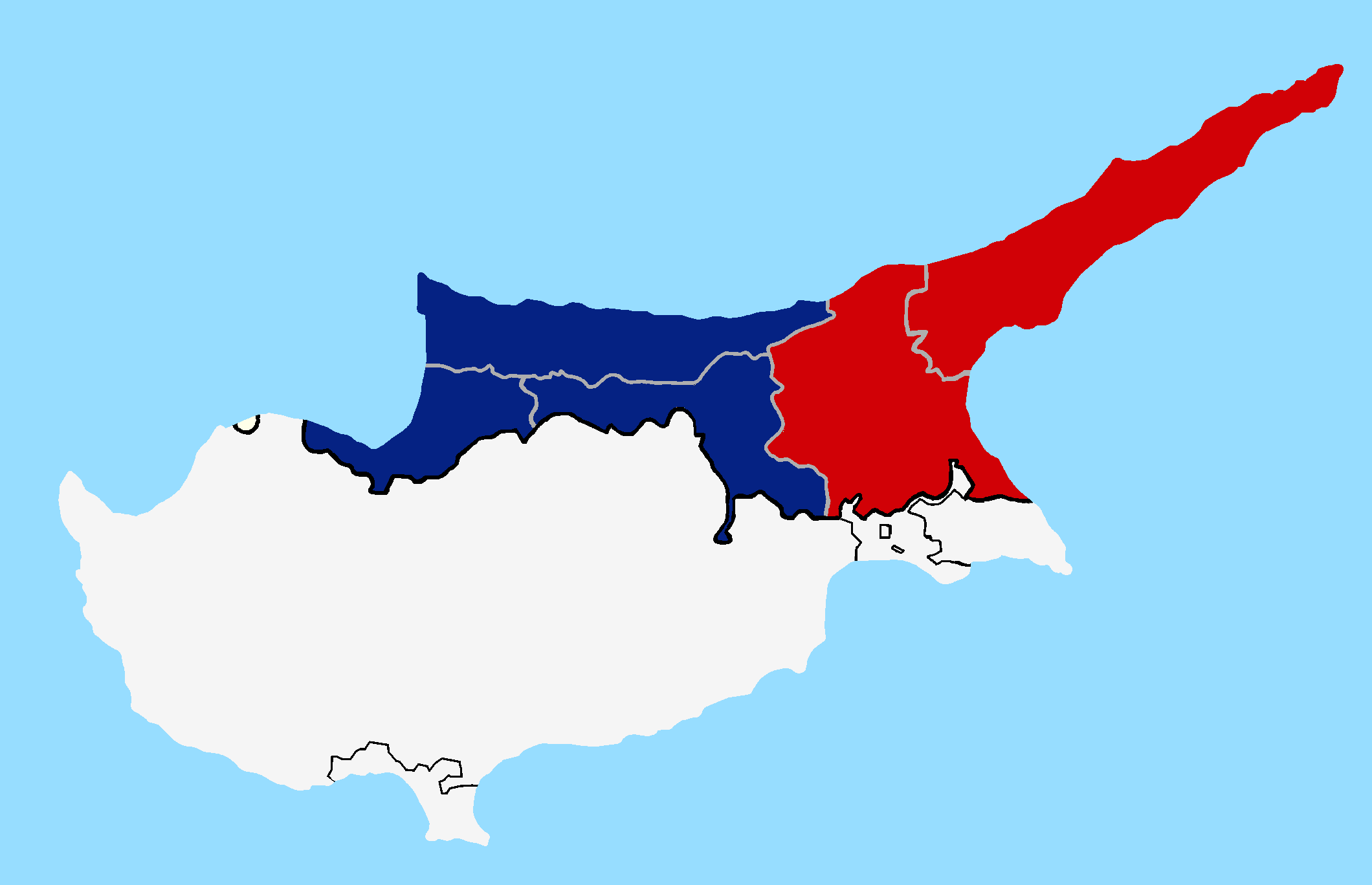
Map showing the winners in the first round by the districts of Northern Cyprus. Red denotes districts won by Eroğlu, while blue denotes districts won by Akıncı.

Akıncı won the first round in three districts; Lefkoşa (31.27%), Girne (27.61%) and Güzelyurt (32.47%). Eroğlu won it in two: Gazimağusa (31.83%) and İskele (37.47%). In the two districts won by Eroğlu, Akıncı came third, also behind Siber. In Lefkoşa and Girne, Özersay was in the second place, followed by Eroğlu and Siber respectively.

Candidate	Party	First round		Second round	
Candidate	Party	Votes	%	Votes	%
Mustafa Akıncı	Independent	29,030	26.94	67,032	60.50
Derviş Eroğlu	Independent	30,328	28.15	43,763	39.50
Sibel Siber	Republican Turkish Party	24,271	22.53		
Kudret Özersay	Independent	22,895	21.25		
Arif Salih Kırdağ	Independent	530	0.49		
Mustafa Onurer	Cyprus Socialist Party	428	0.40		
Mustafa Ulaş	Independent	259	0.24		
Total		107,741	100.00	110,795	100.00
Valid votes		107,741	97.68	110,795	97.64
Invalid/blank votes		2,562	2.32	2,683	2.36
Total votes		110,303	100.00	113,478	100.00
Registered voters/turnout		176,916	62.35	176,980	64.12
Source: High Election Committee – first round, run-off

== Reactions ==
=== Northern Cyprus ===
The results of the first round were described as a "surprise" upset of power by the mainstream newspaper Kıbrıs. The candidates that emerged "joyful" from the first round were, according to the newspaper, Akıncı and Özersay. Özersay's high share of votes was especially pointed out as a surprise, given his lack of political history. It was commented that the discontented supporters of the National Unity Party (UBP) and Democratic Party (DP) had supported Özersay. The ruling Republican Turkish Party (CTP) was reported to be "in shock" over the failure of their candidate to progress to the second round. The newspaper reported claims that Siber had been the victim of an internal struggle within the party, and that many CTP voters had supported Akıncı. As Eroğlu's votes had seen a great decline from 2010, the results reportedly caused great turmoil and controversy within the UBP and the DP, as well as the CTP, which are the largest parties represented in the parliament. On 26 April, while voting, Prime Minister Yorgancıoğlu announced that the CTP congress to determine the leader of the party, scheduled to take place in October or November, could be rescheduled a few months earlier, and that he would not be a candidate in the congress.

The results of the run-off election for Akıncı were called "a remarkable comeback after spending years in the political wilderness" by The New York Times. Meanwhile, political scientist Erol Kaymak from the Eastern Mediterranean University, speaking to Associated Press, said that "Akinci's election was not so much a referendum on a Cyprus peace deal, but rather on Eroglu's failed leadership."

At the night of the run-off election, Eroğlu publicly congratulated Akıncı for his victory. In his statement, he said that he had brought the peace negotiations to where he would have liked them to be and that he had hoped that his efforts would result in a "settlement". He also said that he had "tried to develop the democracy of Northern Cyprus during his long political career". He announced that this would be his last election, but that he would keep sharing his opinions with the people. He claimed that a message had been sent by the people not to him, but to the political parties, and that they should "learn lessons from these results".

Prime Minister Yorgancıoğlu congratulated Akıncı for his victory and expressed his happiness for such a victory by a candidate that his party supported in the second round. He thanked CTP supporters for actively endorsing Akıncı and called for Akıncı to remain equidistant to all political parties during his tenure.

At the night of the election, Akıncı held a "rally of victory" in the İnönü Square of Nicosia. In the rally, he thanked his supporters and supporting political parties and called his election "a success of the Turkish Cypriot people". He said that a change had begun from the top of the country, and that he would strive to solve the Cyprus dispute by initiating trust-building measures. He promised not to interfere with the internal politics of parties and to take a strong stance on social issues such as gender equality. He also denounced allegations that he wanted the return of mainland Turks in Northern Cyprus, saying that he embraced them as "people of this land" and promised to keep a "personality" in the Turkish Cypriot relationship with Turkey, without being submissive or belligerent.

=== Republic of Cyprus ===
Upon Akıncı's election, Nicos Anastasiades, President of the Republic of Cyprus, called to congratulate him. Anastasiades wrote on Twitter that it was "a hopeful development for our common homeland". Foreign Minister Ioannis Kasoulidis said that they were "gratified" by the result and that they would wait for the suggestions of the Turkish side at the table of negotiations.

Former Cypriot president Demetris Christofias sent Akıncı a congratulatory letter, wherein, in reference to the ongoing negotiations for the settlement of the Cyprus dispute, he alluded to obstructionist practices by third-party Greek- and Turkish-Cypriot factions. The letter elicited the protest of centrist DIKO party, who stated that Christofias "equated" Turkish war crimes with the legitimate concerns of the Greek-Cypriot populace. DIKO leader and Member of Parliament Nikolas Papadopoulos refused to congratulate Akıncı, exclaiming on Twitter, "Why exactly should I congratulate the occupation leader?"

Akıncı's win made the headlines in all Greek-Cypriot newspapers the next day. With the exception of Simerini, they all bore optimistic and reconciliatory messages.

=== Turkey ===
The day following his election, Akıncı had a public argument with Turkish President Recep Tayyip Erdoğan. In response to Akıncı's statement that the "mother-daughter" relationship between Turkey and Northern Cyprus should be replaced by a "fraternal" one, Erdoğan said that Akıncı "should mind what he says" and reminded him of Turkey's financial and military support, as well as Turkish soldiers that have fallen in Cyprus. Akıncı responded to this by saying that he was behind his words and could not comprehend why Erdoğan would oppose a fraternal relationship, saying that his policies were approved by the Turkish Cypriot people and asking if "Turkey [did] not want its daughter to grow".

Erdoğan, as well as Prime Minister Ahmet Davutoğlu, later called Akıncı to congratulate him.
