= Ibrahim Aziz =

Ibrahim Aziz may refer to:

- Ibrahim Aziz (political analyst) (born 1938), Turkish Cypriot political analyst
- Ibrahim Aziz (runner) (born 1959), Emirati runner and sprinter
