= To Periodiko =

- Editor: Costis Diogenous
- Categories: General Interest
- Frequency: Weekly
- Circulation: 12,000
- Founded: 1986
- Company: Dias Publishing House
- Country: Cyprus
- Based in: Nicosia
- Language: Greek
- Website: toperiodiko.com

To Periodiko (Greek: Το Περιοδικό), meaning the Magazine is a weekly magazine published in Cyprus. Its headquarters is in Nicosia.

First issued in 1986, the magazine is published by Dias media group which also owns Simerini newspaper and Sigma TV. At its peak it had a circulation of 25,000 copies. It is published in full colour and features columns on current events, lifestyle, politics and fashion. It is currently priced at CY£1.00 and its current circulation is 12,000 to 15,000 copies.
