= Simerini =

- Type: Daily newspaper
- Format: tabloid
- Owner: Dias Publishing House Ltd
- Founder: Costas Ν. Hadjicostis
- Editor: Skevi Stavrou
- General manager: Andis Hadjicostis (2002-2010)
- Founded: 1976
- Political alignment: Right-wing
- Headquarters: Nicosia, Cyprus
- Website: simerini.sigmalive.com

I Simerini (English: The Daily) is a centre-right Greek language independently owned newspaper published in Cyprus since 1976. It is one of the largest newspapers on the island with a daily circulation of around 9,000 copies. Other daily Greek language newspapers (2013) published in Cyprus are Haravgi, Phileleftheros, and Politis.

The paper's motto reads: "Όποιος Ελεύθερα Συλλογάται Συλλογάται Καλά" ("Opios Elefthera Silogate, Silogate Kala") which translates into English as "He who thinks freely, thinks well" a quote taken from Rigas Feraios.

== Historical data for the paper ==
According to Μεγάλη Κυπριακή Εγκυκλοπαίδεια (as of 1989), the first issue of this daily newspaper appeared on 3.2.1976. The encyclopedia also gives more details like the names of the seven journalists who originally cooperated to start the newspaper. From the start the chief editor was Alecos Constantinides until 1982 when he was replaced by Savvas Jacovides. Until then the Director was Kostis Hadjikostis. Alecos Constaninides had moved to become the chief editor of Alithia, which had then changed from a weekly to daily. Originally the size of the Simerini was broadside (57X43 cm)while currently is tabloid.

=== Paper archive ===
All issues after 2005 are available for free in PDF format at the newspaper's website. This archive starts with the 2005 issue of 3 November. The price was 50 cents of the Cyprus pound. The current price of the daily (2014) is one euro while the Sunday edition is 3 euros and includes the OK magazine. This information appears on the second page of the electronic edition.

The issue of 10 July 1982 (number 5232) has a broadsheet format. The editor is Alecos Constantinides. The offices of the paper at that time are at 4 Annis Komninis, Nicosia. A hearing from a court case of the newspaper against another Cypriot paper of the time is presented on the first page of the paper.

== See also ==
List of newspapers in Cyprus
