= .cy =

Top-level Internet domain for Cyprus

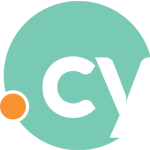
- Introduced: 26 July 1994
- TLD type: Country code top-level domain
- Status: Active
- Registry: University of Cyprus
- Sponsor: University of Cyprus
- Intended use: Entities connected with Cyprus
- Actual use: Very popular in Cyprus
- Registration restrictions: Various restrictions for different subdomains
- Structure: Registrations are taken at third level beneath some second-level labels, or directly at second-level (as of 2019)
- Dispute policies: UDRP
- DNSSEC: Yes
- Registry website: www.nic.cy

.cy is the country code top-level domain (ccTLD) for Cyprus. Some restrictions exist for various subdomains, but .com.cy is unrestricted to Cypriot entities.

== Second level domains ==
- ac.cy – Academic and research institutions.
- net.cy – Internet or Network service providers.
- gov.cy – Governmental institutions.
- org.cy – Nonprofit organizations
- pro.cy – Professional organizations.
- ekloges.cy – Organizations or persons related to elections.
- tm.cy – Officially registered trademarks.
- ltd.cy – Private and public limited companies.
- biz.cy – Any other registered company.
- press.cy – Organizations and entities connected to the press.
- com.cy – Commercial entities (unrestricted registration for Cypriot entities).
- mil.cy – Ministry of Defence
