= Freedom of religion in Cyprus =

The Constitution of the Republic of Cyprus provides for freedom of religion. The government of the Republic of Cyprus is the only internationally recognized government on the island, and administers two-thirds of the island.

== Religious demography ==
Cyprus has an area of 5,747 square miles (14,880 km^{2}) and a population in the government-controlled area of 918,100 in 2022.

The 2011 census of the government-controlled area notes that 89.1 of the population follows Greek Orthodox Christianity, 2.9% are Roman Catholic, 2% are Protestants, 1.8% are Muslims and 1% are Buddhists; Maronite Catholics, Armenian Orthodox, Jews, Jehovah’s Witnesses and Baha’is make up the remainder.

The government requires Greek Orthodox religious instruction in public schools; non-Greek Orthodox pupils may be excused.

In 2023, the country was scored 4 out of 4 for religious freedom.

=== Turkish Cypriots ===
Turkish Cypriots administer approximately one-third of the island. The constitution states that the area is a secular republic and provides for freedom of conscience and religious faith. There are no official statistics on religion, but it is estimated that 97% of the population is Sunni Muslim. The remainder is made up of Alevis, Protestants, Greek Orthodox, Maronite Catholics, Russian Orthodox, Anglican, Baha’is, Jews, and Jehovah’s Witnesses. Primary school students must study religious education for five years, although non-Muslims do not have to sit an examination in this.

This article is informed by the US State Dept reports from 2007 and 2014; later reports are available.

Prior to 1974, the country experienced a long period of strife between its Greek Cypriot and Turkish Cypriot communities. In response, the UN Force in Cyprus (UNFICYP) began peacekeeping operations in 1964. The island has been divided de facto since the Turkish military intervention of 1974, following a coup d'état directed from Greece. The southern part of the island is under the control of the government of the Republic of Cyprus, while the northern part is administered by Turkish Cypriots. In 1983, their administration proclaimed itself the "Turkish Republic of Northern Cyprus" ("TRNC"). The United States does not recognize the "TRNC," nor does any other country except Turkey. A buffer zone, or "green line," patrolled by UNFICYP, separates the two parts. In 2003 Turkish Cypriot authorities relaxed many restrictions on movement between the two communities, including abolishing all crossing fees. The new procedures led to relatively unimpeded contact between the communities and permitted Greek Cypriots and Turkish Cypriots to visit religious sites located in the other community; however, Cypriots, as well as foreigners, must show identification at the buffer zone crossing points to go from one side to the other.

According to the most recent (2001) population census, 94.8 percent of the permanent population in the government-controlled area belongs to the Autocephalous Greek Orthodox Church of Cyprus. Additionally, 0.5 percent of the population is Maronite Catholic, 0.3 percent Armenian Orthodox, 1.5 percent Roman Catholic, 1 percent Protestant, 0.6 percent Muslim, and 1.3 percent atheist, "other," or "not stated."

There is a Buddhist temple in Nicosia and a synagogue in Larnaca. Both are attended primarily by expatriates and foreign residents.

A 1998 opinion poll indicated that 48 percent of Greek Cypriots regularly attended church services, while 49 percent attended only for major religious holidays and ceremonies such as weddings and funerals. The remainder did not attend religious services at all.

== Status of religious freedom ==
=== Legal and policy framework ===
The 1960 Constitution of the Republic of Cyprus provides for freedom of religion, and the government generally respected this right in practice. The government at all levels sought to protect this right in full and did not tolerate its abuse, either by governmental or private actors.

The Constitution specifies that the Autocephalous Greek Orthodox Church of Cyprus, which is not under the authority of the mainland Greek Orthodox Church, has the exclusive right to regulate and administer its internal affairs and property in accordance with its holy canons and charter. The Church of Cyprus is exempt from taxes with regard to religious activity and, according to the law, is required to pay taxes only on strictly commercial activities. The Constitution also lays out guidelines for the Vakif, the Muslim institution that regulates religious activity for Turkish Cypriots, which similarly has the exclusive right to regulate and administer its internal affairs and property in accordance with its laws and principles. The Vakif, however, operated only in the area administered by Turkish Cypriots during the period covered by this report. No legislative, executive, or other act may contravene or interfere with the Orthodox Church or the Vakif.

Three other religious groups are recognized in the 1960 Constitution: Maronite Catholics, Armenian Orthodox, and "Latins" (Roman Catholics). These groups are also exempt from taxes and are eligible, along with the Church of Cyprus and the Vakif, for government subsidies to their religious institutions.

The government has constitutional and other legal bars against religious discrimination. The 1975 Vienna III Agreement remains the basic agreement covering treatment of Greek Cypriots and Maronites living in the area administered by Turkish Cypriots and Turkish Cypriots living in the government-controlled area. Among other things, this agreement provides for facilities for religious worship. Religions other than the five recognized religions are not required to register with the government; however, if they desire to engage in financial transactions, such as maintaining a bank account, they must register as a nonprofit organization. To register, a group must submit an application through an attorney that states the purposes of the nonprofit organization and provides the names of the organization's corporate directors. Upon approval, nonprofit organizations are tax-exempt and are required to provide annual reports of their activities. Registration is granted promptly. No religious groups were denied registration during the reporting period.

There are no prohibitions against missionary activity or proselytizing in the government-controlled area. Foreign missionaries must obtain and periodically renew residence permits in order to live in the country; normally, renewal requests are approved.

The government requires children in public primary and secondary schools to take instruction in the Greek Orthodox religion. Parents of other religions may request that their children be excused. These children are exempted from attending religious services and instruction.

The Ministry of Education postponed implementation of its February 2006 proposal to reduce the number of hours of religious instruction required in public schools from 2 hours to 1 hour per week. The Church of Cyprus and other religious organizations strongly objected to the proposal; the Ministry postponed implementation to allow public debate and discussion; however, it did not schedule such debate and discussion during the reporting period.

The government of Cyprus recognizes the following holy days as national holidays: Epiphany, Annunciation, Good Friday, Easter Monday, Holy Spirit Day (Pentecost), Assumption, and Christmas.

=== Restrictions on religious freedom ===
Government policy and practice contributed to the generally free practice of religion in Cyprus.

Since 2003, when restrictions of movement to the northern part of the island were relaxed, Greek Cypriots as well as other religious groups have reported better access to religious sites in the area administered by Turkish Cypriots. Turkish Cypriots enjoyed relatively easy access to religious sites in the government-controlled area.

The government reported that it spent $173,272 (€130,280) in 2006 for the conservation of 17 mosques and other Muslim places of worship in the area under its control. The 2007 budget for the same project was $462,414 (€347,680).

Missionaries have the legal right to proselytize, but the government closely monitors missionary activity. It is illegal for a missionary to use "physical or moral compulsion" to make religious conversions. The police may investigate missionary activity based on a citizen's complaint. They may also open an investigation if missionaries are suspected of being involved in illegal activities that threaten the security of the republic, constitutional or public order, or public health and morals.

Conscientious objectors, including those for religious reasons, are exempt from active military duty; however, they are legally required to complete an alternative military service and perform reservist duty in the Greek Cypriot National Guard (GCNG). The Independent Authority for Investigating Complaints and Allegations against the Police closed an investigation that resulted from a May 2006 nongovernmental organization (NGO) complaint filed with the Authority and the Ombudsman regarding police treatment of Muslim asylum seekers. The NGO had reported complaints from political asylees of Muslim origin who had difficulty securing employment because of their religion. Several women also reported that potential employers did not like their headscarves. Another asylee alleged he could not secure housing due to his Muslim faith. The Ombudsman' Office did not proceed with an investigation because it could not locate one of the complainants. The Independent Authority asked the NGO for additional information, which the NGO was unable to produce. As a result, the Independent Authority closed the investigation.

=== Improvements and positive developments in respect for religious freedom ===
On February 21, 2007, Church of Cyprus Archbishop Chrysostomos II and the Turkish Cypriot Head of Religious Affairs, Ahmet Yonluer, met at the Ledra Palace Hotel for what was the first meeting of the communities' religious leaders in the past 33 years.

On July 3–5, 2006, Cyprus cohosted with Malaysia the second Asia-Europe Meeting Interfaith Dialogue, which sought to promote greater understanding between different religions and to help combat terrorism.

== Societal abuses and discrimination ==
Because religion and ethnicity are often closely linked, it is difficult to categorize many incidents as being solely based on religious identity. Those who are not members of the prevailing religious group say they often fear negative social reactions if they choose to refrain from participating in public ceremonies that were religious in nature. Likewise, Greek Cypriots who converted from Greek Orthodoxy to other faiths say they sometimes faced social ostracism. Nevertheless, relations between the Church of Cyprus and other religious communities in the government-controlled area are cordial.

In May 2007 an NGO reported that it continued to receive complaints from recognized political asylees of Muslim origin who had difficulty securing employment because of their religion. An Iranian asylee alleged that he was fired from his position at a major television station that has strong links with the Church of Cyprus when he mentioned that he was Muslim.

In April 2007 court proceedings began for 13 suspects charged with attacking Turkish Cypriot students. On November 22, 2006, 15 to 20 Greek Cypriot teenagers, believed to be members of an ultranationalist group, National Voice of Youth with a Greek Soul, entered the English School in Nicosia and attacked a group of Turkish Cypriot students, causing minor injuries. Reports in the Greek Cypriot press about an earlier incident at the same school, which reported that an 11-year-old male Turkish Cypriot student verbally insulted a Greek Cypriot student wearing a Christian cross, were blamed for inciting the latter event. The government condemned the November 22 attack as an aberration, not indicative of a broader atmosphere of discrimination or racial hatred against Turkish Cypriots.

Although Turkish Cypriots occasionally reported that unused mosques in the government-controlled area have been vandalized, the government of Cyprus routinely maintains and repairs them. In 2016, the 19th-century mosque in the village of Deneia was subjected to an arson attack. The attack was condemned by President Nicos Anastasiades. This was not the first time the mosque was attack; during its previous restoration, it sustained serious damage in another attack.

The Jewish Community Center in Larnaca reported the water meter of the Jewish cemetery was destroyed and removed two times in 2014. The center also reported three of their students were harassed on their way home during the holiday of Sukkot.

The Cyprus Humanist Association accused the Ministry of Education of discriminations against atheists. According to the Association, the Ministry is promoting anti-atheist educational material through its official website. The International Humanist Union listed Cyprus among Saudi Arabia, Egypt, Malaysia in their promoting state hatred against atheists and humanists during the 37th session of the United Nations Human Rights Council.

== See also ==
- Human rights in Cyprus
- Freedom of religion in Northern Cyprus
