= Academics for Peace =

Turkish Association

- Barış İçin Akademisyenler
- Abbreviation: BAK
- Formation: November 2012
- Website: https://barisicinakademisyenler.net/English

The Academics for Peace (Turkish: Barış İçin Akademisyenler, BAK) refers to an association of academics who support a peaceful solution to the Kurdish Turkish conflict. They were established in November 2012 and their first public appearance was in support of hunger strikers in Turkish prisons.

The petition condemned Turkish state security operations in predominantly Kurdish-populated areas, describing the use of heavy weapons as comparable to wartime operations and calling for independent national and international observers to investigate the situation. The day after the petition was publicly announced, President Recep Tayyip Erdoğan criticised the signatories and their appeal for international observers. Investigations into signatories were opened by prosecutors and universities, and several universities issued statements condemning the petition. In March 2016, three signatories were jailed pending investigation for alleged terrorist propaganda after publicly defending the petition; other signatories also faced criminal and disciplinary proceedings. Following the failed coup attempt in 2016, dismissals of academics became part of a broad purge of Turkey's universities, which also affected Academics for Peace signatories.

== History ==
In November 2012 about 10,000 prisoners were in a hunger strike and had three demands. They wanted to be able to defend themselves in Kurdish language while on trial, the improvement of Abdullah Öcalan's detention conditions, and the start of peace negotiations between Turkey and the Kurdistan Workers' Party (PKK). A group of academics discussed their demands in a meeting and subsequently they prepared a petition in support of the hunger strikers. Eventually, more than 200 academics from over 50 universities signed the petition in support of the prisoners' demands. Then, since negotiations between Öcalan and politicians of the Peoples' Democratic Party (HDP) were initiated in January 2013, the Academics for Peace actively informed about it.

After the peace process was terminated and the conflict gained force the BAK signed a second petition called "We will be not a party to this crime!". The petition was directed against the human rights violations in cities like Nusaybin, Cizre and Diyarbakır and demanded the reactivation of the peace process. The BAK organized press conferences in Ankara and Istanbul on 11 January 2016, during which they read out their demands. The petition was initially signed by over a thousand academics from more than 80 universities. The Academics for Peace encouraged academics from foreign countries to sign the petition as well and over 300 academics, amongst which figured prominent academics like the feminist Judith Butler and the linguist Noam Chomsky, signed the petition.

== Reaction to the second petition ==
=== Governmental campaign against the signatories ===
The government of Turkey began a campaign against the Academics for Peace, with President Recep Tayyip Erdogan accusing them of being terrorists themselves. Erdoğan referred to the signatories as "pseudo-academics... those whose mentality is alien to us", characterised their call for international observers as "colonialism" (müstemlekecilik), and compared their position with a "treasonous mentality of a century ago". According to Uğur Derin, this comparison may have referred either to Armenian attempts to internationalise the Armenian question around 1915 or to the support of some Turkish groups for an American mandate over Turkey following the collapse of the Ottoman Empire.

=== Nationalist opposition and intimidation ===
Nationalist students called for the dismissal of the Academics for Peace from their universities. Several signatories received threats over anonymous messages and had their universities offices marked red. Two such incidents are known to have been carried out by students identified with Ülkücülük (extreme nationalism), who marked the doors of two professors at Ankara's Gazi University. Uğur Derin described the incident as reminiscent of practices in Nazi Germany.

Hundreds of signatories had to resign or were dismissed from the universities where they worked.

Devlet Bahçeli, the leader of the Nationalist Movement Party (MHP) made a statement accusing the Academics for Peace of treason.

=== Media campaigns and threats ===
Several staunchly pro-government newspapers published "treason lists", compared by Derin to McCarthyism. One journalist wrote a column inviting the public to condemn the academics to "civilized death". The ultra-nationalist, pro-Erdogan Turkish criminal Sedat Peker published an article directed at the academics on his website in which it was stated '"We will shed your blood and swim in it!". Peker had to stand trial for the threat but was acquitted.

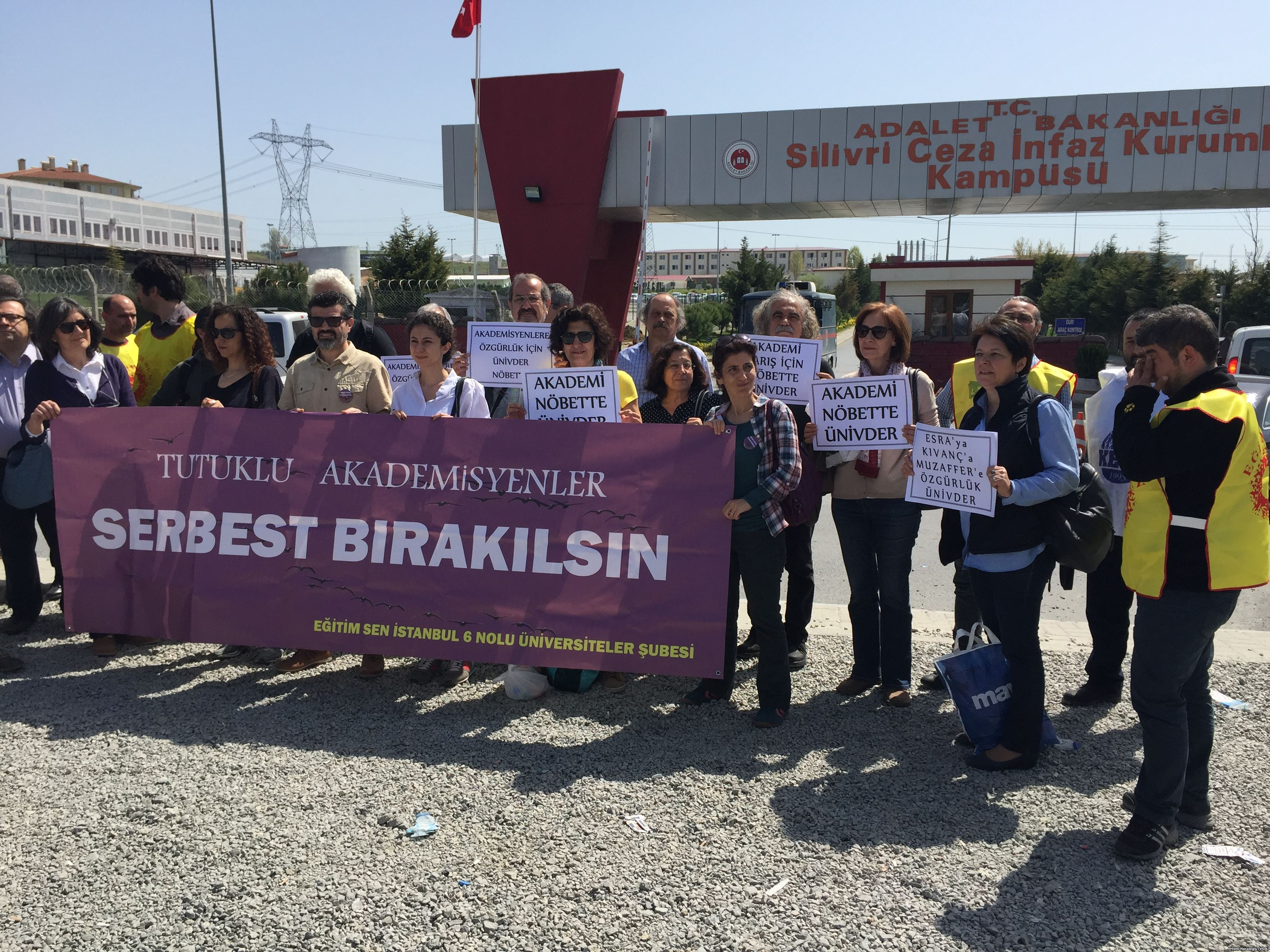
Protest for the arrested academics in front of the Silivri prison

=== Support ===
The academics were supported by Human Rights Watch, the US Ambassador to Turkey John Bass, and other NGOs.

== Legal prosecution ==
The Turkish Government ordered the detention and arrest of dozens of signatories of the second petition and accused them of propaganda for a terrorist organization. Against all of the over 1000 signatories investigations were opened. Over 600 signatories were charged, mostly under Article No. 7.2 of the Anti-Terror Law or Article 301 of the penal code of the Turkish Republic. In most trials which ended in a verdict, the defendants were found guilty of the offences and sentenced them to prison sentences between 15 months and 3 years. The majority of the sentences were suspended but against 36 academics not. 29 verdicts were not suspended as the prison term in question was above 2 years and against the others it was not suspended as the defendants did want a suspension of the verdict. In July 2019, the Constitutional Court of Turkey ruled that the rights of expression of the signatories of the petition were violated and in September 2019 a Turkish court for the first time acquitted one of the Academics for Peace. In the following months several trials ended with an acquittal. 171 academics for peace were found innocent by 17 separate courts as of September 2019. As of 30 October 2020, 204 academics were sentenced to a prison term higher than one year. While most verdicts were appealable, thirty-six academics are in prison, either because their verdict amounts to over two years or the academics did not accept the deferral of the verdict.

== Awards ==
- 2016 MESA Academic Freedom Award of the Middle Eastern Studies Association
- 2018, Courage to Think Defender Award of the Scholars at Risk

Aachen 2016 – Peace Prize Johann-Philipp-Palm 2016 – Award for Freedom of Press and Expression Middle East Studies Association 2016 – Award for Academic Freedom Diyarbakır Medical Chamber 2016 – Prize for Peace and Democracy Human Rights Association 2016 – Ayşe Nur Zarakolu Award for Freedom of Thought and Expression Hrant Dink 2016 – Inspirations Award Halkevleri 2016 – Solidarity Award Social Democracy Foundation 2016 – Prize for Human Rights, Democracy, Peace and Solidarity İstanbul Medical Chamber 2017-Sevinç Özgüner Award for Human Rights, Peace and Democracy Scholars at Risk Network 2018 – Courage to Think Defender Award Suruç Families’ Initiative 2019 – Award for Justice and Resistance
