= Access to public information in Cyprus =

Access to public information and freedom of information (FOI) refer to the right of access to information held by public bodies also known as "right to know". Access to public information is considered of fundamental importance for the effective functioning of democratic systems, as it enhances governments' and public officials' accountability, boosting people participation and allowing their informed participation into public life. The fundamental premise of the right of access to public information is that the information held by governmental institutions is in principle public and may be concealed only on the basis of legitimate reasons which should be detailed in the law.

The right of access to information in Cyprus is guaranteed in constitutional provisions on freedom of expression but the legal framework is seriously flawed, with no law on access to information in the Republic of Cyprus and a law that falls below Council of Europe standards in the Northern part of Cyprus.

As to 2011, a research by the Open Cyprus Project showed that there was a level of 75% of administrative silence island-wide, in response to information requests. Over half of the respondents to this survey stated that, in practice, access to key documents is not possible.

Since late 2013, a draft law on the Right to Access Public Information is being discussed in the Parliament of the (Southern) Republic of Cyprus.

On 22 December 2017 the law has finally been approved (Law number 184(I)/2017).

== Northern Cyprus ==
The right to access public information is granted by Article No. 24 of the Constitution of Northern Cyprus. Even if the Constitutional article echoes Article No. 10 of the European Convention on Human Rights (ECHR), experts say that the possibilities to restrict the fundamental right of access to public information are provided in an overbroad manner. Specifically, Article No. 10 (2) ECHR says that the conditions and restrictions imposed on the right to freedom of expression have to be “necessary in a democratic society”. Instead, even if the Constitution of Northern Cyprus- under Article No. 24- provides for a test of whether a restriction to such a right is necessary, it does not specify the key qualification of being necessary in a democratic society, as required by Article 10 of the ECHR.

The relevant laws regulating the right to access public information in the Northern part of Cyprus are: the Right to Access Information Law No. 12 of 2006; the Public Officials Law No. 7 of 1979; the State Procurement Regulation; the Rules and Procedures of the Parliament and the Personal Data Protection Act No. 89 of 2007.

The Right to Access Information Law obliges “public bodies” to process all information requests, regardless of the means by which they are submitted.

A 2011 research recommends that, with regard to the Access to Information Law in the Northern part of the country, the scope of the law should be extended to all classes of information held by public bodies. Also, according to experts, an implementing regulation should be approved, clarifying the administrative procedure to request and receive information. Finally, the Access to Information Assessment Commission foreseen by the law has not been appointed yet.

== Republic of Cyprus ==
The Cypriot government couldn't sign or ratify the 2009 Council of Europe Convention on Access to Official Documents as it did not have a transparency law that meets the Convention’s minimum standard. Until 2017, Cyprus was the only country in Europe, other than Luxembourg, without a law guaranteeing the right of access to information. But as of 2018, the law has been published (Law 184(I)/2017).

The relevant laws with regard to the right to access public information are the following:

- Article No. 19 and 29 of the Constitution;
- the Act regarding Personal Data N. 138 of 2001, which makes clear that this data can be accessed only by the affected person (s);
- the Act on Re-Use of Existing Information Held by Public Sector Bodies, No. 132 of 2006: it ensures that when the authority grants one user permission to make use of a large volume of information, it must grant other users access on the same terms;
- the Press Law No. 145 o 1985: it grants a general right of access to all information held by public bodies;
- the Environmental Information Law No. 119 of 2004, which clearly grants access to information on a non- discriminatory basis;
- the State Archives Law No. 208 of 1991, for information held in archives. It does not grant a general public access before a thirty-year period;
- the State Secrets Law No. 2016 of 2002;
- the Public Service Law No. 1 of 1990;
- the Public Procurement Law No.1 of 200;
- the Public Aid Law No. 30 of 2001;
- the Administrative Principles Law No. 158 of 1999.

According to experts, these non-specific laws that might grant access to some classes of information, such as environmental information or archives, require amendments to comply with the basic international and European standards.

Since April 2014, the Republic of Cyprus has been holding public consultations aimed at drafting a Freedom of Information Law, which as to 2017 has to be enacted. In October 2015, the Cypriot Justice Minister Ionas Nicolaou expressed his commitment to adopt a strong access to information (Freedom of Information) law that will be “one of the best in the European Union”.

Again, in February 2017, the association Access Info Europe has addressed the Cypriot Parliament asking to review such a draft. In particular, Access Info Europe advocated for the removal of the fees for making information requests and for cutting down the possible 60 days extension for complex requests which has been included in the draft. Moreover, according to Access Info, also the regime of possible exceptions needs to be reviewed. Currently, the draft includes absolute exceptions, with no public interest test. Furthermore, under the international and European transparency standards, when disclosure of information is denied requesters must be given clear reasons as to why the exception has been applied.

In March 2017, the recommendations elaborated by Access Info Europe were sent to the Cypriot Parliament Legal Committee.

Since March 2015, Citizen Service Centres have been established all over the island in order to provide multiple services as an alternative channel for dealing with public agencies/organizations. They work through a single 4-digit number (1434) which citizens can call in order to obtain information with respect to approximately 90 services offered by the CSCs, such as eligibility criteria for submitting an application, documents that need to be submitted, fees charged etc. Through this Call Centre, citizens can also submit applications for 18 services relating to the issuing of specific documents/licenses/certificates etc.

== See also ==
- Media of Cyprus
- Access to public information in Europe
- Transparency of media ownership in Europe
