= Sedat Peker =

Turkish mafia boss (born 1971)

- Born: Sedat Peker; 1 December 1970 (age 55); Adapazarı, Sakarya, Turkey
- Other name: Reis Sedat Peker
- Occupations: Mafia boss, YouTuber
- Years active: 1990–present
- Known for: Turkish mafia activities, whistle-blowing
- Spouses: Beyza Peker (before 2001) Özge Peker (m. 2008)
- Children: 5
- Website: www.sedatpeker.com

Reis Sedat Peker (Turkish: [(re'jis) seˈdat peˈcæɾ]; born 1 December 1970) is a Turkish mafia leader and whistle-blower who has made multiple allegations regarding Turkish politicians and alleged government involvement in illegal activities through his YouTube channel. He identifies himself as a pan-Turkist and Turanist.

== Early life and education ==
Sedat was born in Adapazarı, in the Turkish province of Sakarya. He spent considerable time in Germany. In a 1999 interview with Milliyet he self-identified as a pan-Turkist and Turanist.

== Career ==
Peker was tried in 1997 for the murder of the drug smuggler Abdullah Topçu, but was acquitted. The two other defendants in the same case, alleged to be Peker's employees, were sentenced to life imprisonment. After the acquittal, he fled to Romania and was sought for, amongst others, protection racketeering, coercion, and incitement to murder. During this time it was reported that Peker had been visited by a minister and a member of parliament from the Motherland Party and guaranteed, in return for an unknown favor, to be only imprisoned for a short period of time. As of 2022, Peker revealed that the favour that secured his release was to turn in a cassette footage of then PM Mesut Yılmaz being beaten up in Hungary because of his gambling debts.

On 17 August 1998, Peker was brought to Turkey in his own free will and surrendered to the authorities. The case against him was opened in September 1998. He pleaded guilty to the crimes for which he was accused and the court found him guilty of building a criminal organization. During the trial, Peker made some remarks without further explanation: "An older member of parliament sent me an SMS which said I shouldn't behave too arrogantly. I would like to tell you (the court) everything, because if I don't it could come to pass that I commit suicide under suspicious circumstances." The prosecutors requested at least 7½ years' imprisonment, but Peker was only sentenced to eight months and 29 days. He was released on 24 May 1999.

In May 2005, he was arrested during Operation Butterfly. On 31 January 2007, he was again found guilty of building and leading a criminal organization, robbery, forgery, and two counts of false imprisonment, and sentenced to 14 years and five months.

Peker is allegedly a member of the underground Turkish organization Ergenekon, and Veli Küçük stated in 2008 that Peker was the "son of a friend." so on 5 August 2013, Peker was sentenced to ten years in prison as part of the Ergenekon trials; however, he and other convicts (Doğu Perinçek, Kemal Kerinçsiz and Tuncay Özkan) were released a few months later.

On 13 January 2016, Peker issued death threats against academics who signed the petition for peace with the Kurdistan Workers' Party (PKK) in a statement on his personal website. He was prosecuted for this, but was acquitted in July 2018.

In early 2020, he went from Turkey to Montenegro, then he left the Balkans to Morocco, and later to the United Arab Emirates.

=== Whistle-blower ===
In May 2021, during the COVID-19 pandemic in Turkey, he started a confession video series on YouTube announcing one video each Sunday about the deep state in Turkey. He accused Tolga Ağar, son of former interior minister Mehmet Ağar, of raping and murdering Kazakh student Yeldana Kaharman. In addition, he alleged Mehmet Ağar's role in the killing of Kutlu Adalı, and alleged Ağar's involvement, along with former Prime Minister Binali Yıldırım's son Erkam, in an international drug trafficking scheme. He later accused SADAT, founded by retired Brigadier General and former presidential advisor Adnan Tanrıverdi, of being involved in the arms shipment to Al-Nusra Front during the Syrian Civil War.

On December 12, 2021, 140journos released a documentary on YouTube featuring him and some prominent journalists and political figures like former Deputy Prime Minister Bülent Arınç of Turkey. The documentary touched on the impact of the deep state in Turkey on the political and judicial system and how Sedat Peker's involvement with the government scandals started. He also accuses the Minister of the interior, Süleyman Soylu, of having betrayed him after having protected him.

=== Late 2021 - present ===
Since late 2021, Peker has remained largely based in the UAE and has not resumed the political video campaign that made him a prominent figure in Turkish public life, following his 2021 allegations against senior officials. Turkish authorities have continued to seek his extradition and he remains subjected to related legal proceedings. During 2025 and 2026, Peker gradually reemerged in public life, primarily through charitable donations and support of high profile causes rather than further political allegations. In December 2025, he broke approximately four years of public silence with an audio message concerning aid for animal shelters, and in January 2026 he was reported to have made substantial donations to people in need. On August 28, 2026, he posted on social media that he would "return" to purchase a building after "doors had been closed in his face", a statement that prompted renewed speculation about a possible return to Turkey. However, the message specified no date or concrete plan, and there is no confirmed indication that his legal situation had changed.

== Personal life ==
On 30 May 2008, during his incarceration, Peker married his lawyer, Özge Yılmaz.
