= Human rights in Cyprus =

Human rights in Cyprus are protected by the constitution of the Republic of Cyprus.

In a number of cases, the European Court of Human Rights has found Turkey responsible for continuous violations of the European Convention on Human Rights in the Republic of Cyprus as a result of the Turkish Invasion in 1974 and continuous occupation of 37% of its territory. Regarding human rights in the areas under the effective control of the Republic of Cyprus, according to the 2010 US Department of State human rights report, there were reports of police abuse and degrading treatment of persons in custody and asylum seekers, as well as instances of discrimination and violence against members of minority ethnic and national groups. Trafficking of women to the island, particularly for sexual exploitation was reportedly a problem. Several instances of violence against women and children were also reported.

== Democratic freedom ==
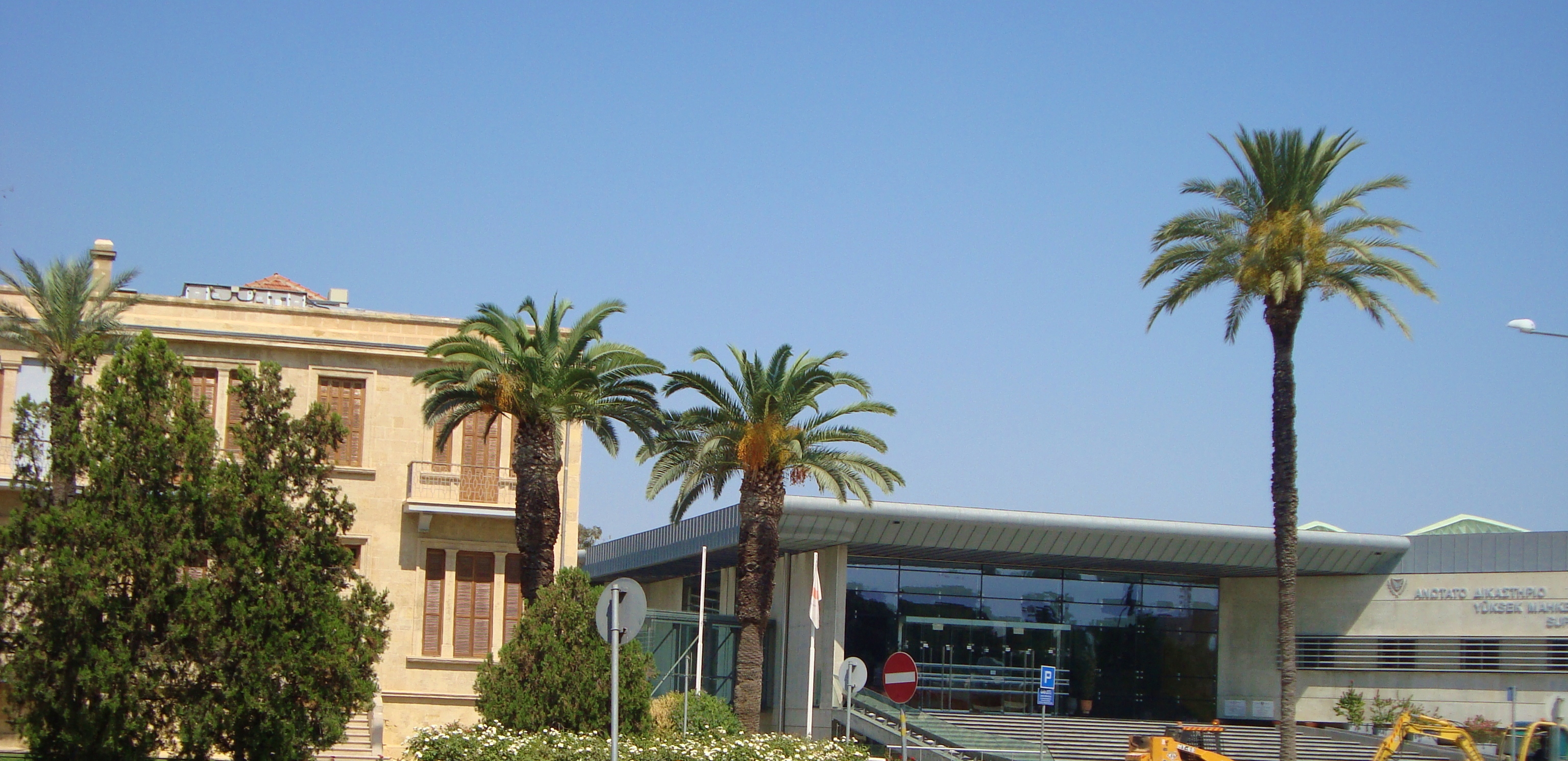
Cyprus Court of Justice in Nicosia, Cyprus

Freedom House classified the perceived level of democratic and political freedom in Cyprus as "free" in 2011 in its Freedom in the World report. The US Department of State reported in 2010 that the recent elections were free and fair.

Ibrahim Aziz, who was prevented from voting in the elections, applied to the European Court of Human Rights. In 2004, in the case of Aziz v. Cyprus, the ECHR ruled that his right to vote was denied. After this case, the right to vote was given to the Turkish Cypriots residing in the Republic of Cyprus. However, Turkish Cypriots still cannot run in presidential elections and the Turkish Cypriots which reside in Northern Cyprus cannot vote in elections, even though they are citizens of the Republic of Cyprus.

== Rights of minorities ==
US Department of State reported in 2010 that there were instances of discrimination and violence against members of minority ethnic and national groups. Minority Rights Group International reported in 2011 that minorities in Cyprus faced serious discrimination and they were excluded from policital activity. The US Department of State report in 2005 stated that discrimination against Turkish Cypriots and Roma were problems. There has been some mistreatment of the Turkish Cypriots visiting the area controlled by the Republic of Cyprus.

The US Department of State report about human rights in Cyprus in 2002 said that:

"Some of the approximately 300 Turkish Cypriots living in the government-controlled area faced difficulties in obtaining identification cards and other government documents, especially if they were born after 1974. Turkish Cypriots also appeared to be subjected to surveillance by the Greek Cypriot police."

However, according to the Interior Minister Neoclis Sylikiotis in an interview to Turkish-Cypriot newspaper Kıbrıs in 2011, 93,308 Turkish Cypriots already have ID cards, 58,069 Turkish Cypriots hold Cypriot passports of which 7,376 are biometric.

== Fair trial ==
Although the prisons generally meet international standards, there has been reports stating the prisons to be overcrowded. There has been reports that the police had phsiycally abused detainees and had discriminated them. Some non-governmental organizations reported that foreign detainees complained that they had been subjected to physical violence.

In 2008, the Supreme Court of the Republic of Cyprus decided that the police had restricted Andreas Constantinou's access to legal aid. Also, in 2008, the ECHR said that "a question arises as to the conformity of such legislation with the requirements of Article 6 of the Convention [...] there is a priori no reason why it should not be made available in spheres other than criminal law."

In the case of Panovits v. Cyprus in 2009, the ECHR ruled that:

"In these circumstances, the Court concludes that the Assize Court’s handling of the confrontation with the applicant’s defence counsel rendered the trial unfair. It follows that there has been a violation of Article 6 § 1 in this respect."

== Right to property ==
In 2005, 25 cases by Turkish Cypriots were filed in the courts of the Republic of Cyprus, stating that they did not have access to their properties in the Republic of Cyprus-controlled areas.

== Freedom of religion ==
The US Department of State reported in 2010 that freedom of religion was generally respected by the government. The government conserves the mosques. Although there are 17 mosques in the Republic of Cyprus-controlled area, only five of them are in public use.

In November 2005 the Ombudsman's Office issued a report on a complaint from Jehovah's Witnesses whose child was excused from religious instruction but who was subsequently harassed by fellow students and pressured by a religious instructor. The report concluded that the student's complaint was valid and that the instructor's remarks during a lesson on religious sects violated the student's religious freedom. Also, in November 2005 press reports said that the police and the municipality had harassed the Buddhist temple in Strovolos.

Nicos Trimikliniotis and Corina Demetriou noted that:

"'Religious' discrimination is not exhausted there, however, as the treatment of Jehovah Witness conscientious objectors refusing to serve in the military illustrate."

== Right to education ==
There is currently no school for Turkish Cypriots living in the Republic of Cyprus-controlled areas. Maronites have an elementary school, but no secondary school, and Antonis Hadjiroussos underlines the danger of the assimilation of Maronites into the Greek Cypriot community because of this.

== Rights of women ==
Laws prohibit rape and spousal rape in the Republic of Cyprus. There has been a sharp increase in the number of these crimes in the 2000s. Although sexual harassment in the workplace is prohibited, it is a widespread problem, but only few cases are reported to the authorities.

In 1996, the UN Committee on the Elimination of Discrimination Against Women, Concluding Observations noted that women were not represented in political life much, they were absent from higher levels of the government, the trafficking of women and their sexual exploitation was against human rights, there was sexual harassment in the workplace, and women were not paid equal money for work of equal value.

The committee also said:

"The Committee exhorts the Government to extend full social security coverage to self-employed rural women and to abolish existing discrimination in this respect between married and unmarried women. The Committee urges the Government to implement special sensitization and training programmes in gender issues for all law enforcement officials and judges, particularly judges in family courts. The Committee strongly recommends that urgent special temporary measures be adopted, under article 4 of the Convention, with the aim of substantially increasing the presence of women in all areas of public and political life, as well as actively promoting their position in the senior management of the civil service and in the diplomatic service. The Committee urges the Government to explore the proposal of non-governmental organizations to establish an equal opportunities commission to deal with complaints by women and to serve in a mediatory capacity."

In 2006, the same committee expressed their concern about discrimination against women migrants, including domestic helpers and agricultural workers, lower number of women which have the PhD degree when compared with men, and "the lack of a comprehensive and systematic approach to gender equality policies".

A US Department of State report in 2010 stated that:

"On 7 January, the ECHR ruled in Rantsev v. Cyprus and Russia that Cyprus failed to protect 20-year-old Russian cabaret artist Oxana Rantseva from human trafficking and failed to conduct an effective investigation into the circumstances of her death in 2001."

== Freedom of press and speech ==
In 2010, the US Department of State reported that the law provided for freedom of speech and of the press, and the government generally respected these rights in practice. The UNHCR also reported in 2006 that the freedom of press was generally respected, and independent press often criticized the authorities. On 18 July 2005, the police used excessive force against demonstrators and journalists at a picket by striking lorry drivers.

In 2004, the media was stifled by the government of the Republic of Cyprus to broadcast programmes against the Annan Plan for Cyprus. European Commissioner Günter Verheugen was refused to air-time on any Greek Cypriot TV channel because if he was not refused, he would present arguments supporting the plan.

In 2007, then President Tassos Papadopoulos "personally intervened" to force the dismissal of the press attaché at the Cyprus High Commission in London, Soteris Georgallis, because he had attended to a book presentation which was addressed by a critic of Papadopoulos, Takis Hadjidemetriou. Kyriakos Pierides reported in 2007 that the "pro-government political and commercial pressures are a constant factor inhibiting the work of the media there".

In 2008, the Organization for Security and Co-operation in Europe, in a report written by the Turkish Cypriot Human Rights Foundation and the Turkish Cypriot Journalists' Union reported that the government of the Republic of Cyprus were violating the rights of Turkish Cypriots on the freedom of press. It added that the change in Cyprus Broadcasting Corporation's broadcasting frequency prevented many Turkish Cypriot TV channels broadcasting in Northern Cyprus, thus violating the freedom of the speech.

The World Press Freedom Index ranked Cyprus 45 in 2007, 31 in 2008, 25 in 2009, and ranked it back down to 45 in 2010. In 2016 it was ranked 27th.

== Human trafficking and rights of asylum seekers ==
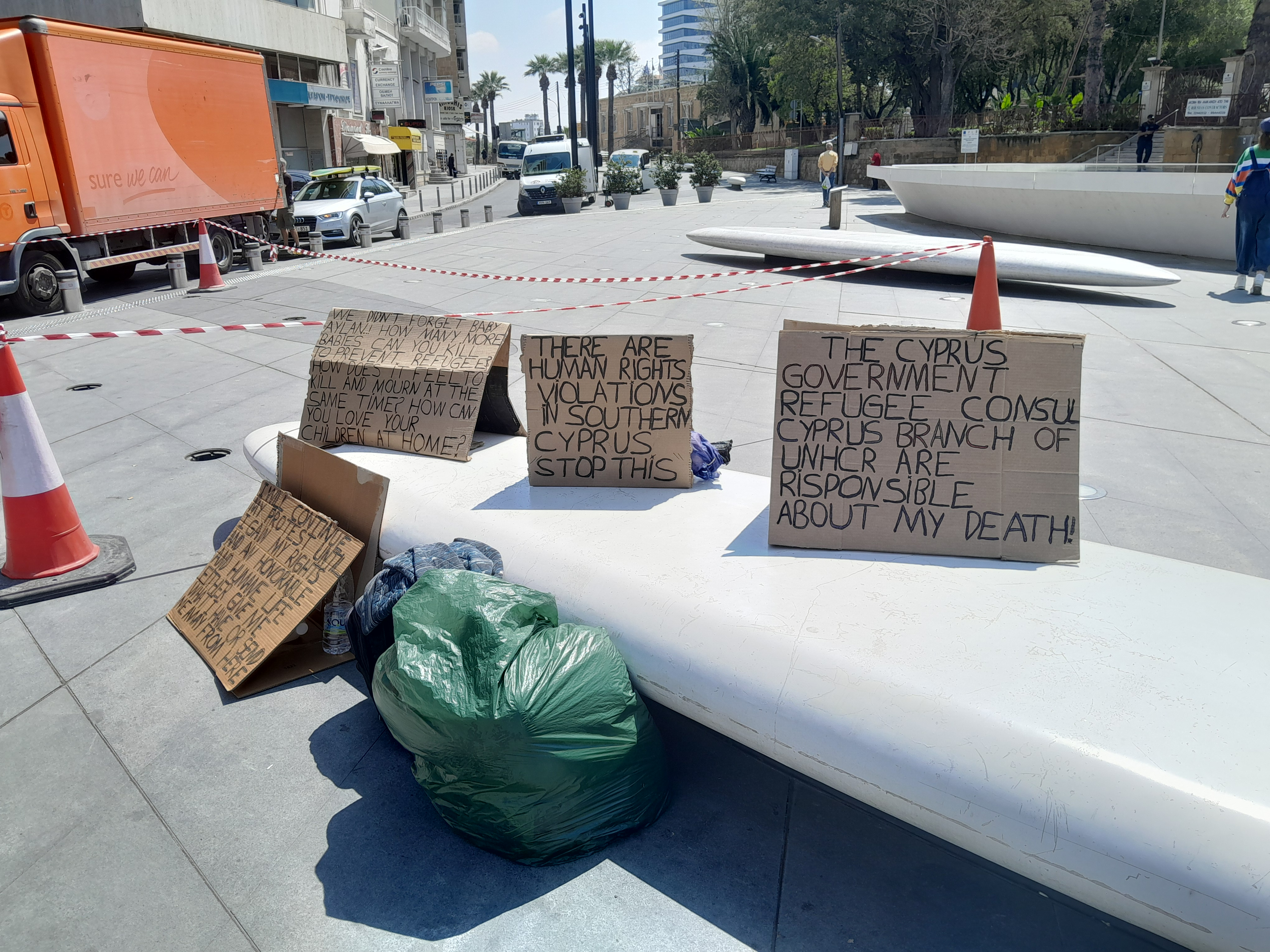
Human rights protest of refugees in Nicosia, Republic of Cyprus 2024

Prostitution is rife in Cyprus, and the island has been criticized for its role in the sex trade as one of the main routes of human trafficking from Eastern Europe.

In May 2011, the UN Committee on Economic, Social and Cultural Rights said that rejected asylum-seekers were kept for too long in detention and inconvenient conditions. In May 2005, the KISA accused the police of violating the law and the human rights of asylum seekers by carrying out illegal arrests, detentions, and deportations. Another non-governmental organization (NGO) reported in 2005 that the police deported long-term residents, as long as 11 years.

A large number of Romanian nationals were subjected to forced labor in the country in 2009. In August 2009 the UNHCR complained through the media that a Kurdish child suffering from a terminal congenital condition was denied government funding to travel abroad for medical treatment because of his refugee status, in contravention of the country's refugee law, which provides refugees access to the same medical treatment as Cypriots and other EU citizens. detention by occupying the water-tank tower of the prison in Nicosia and a hunger strike in Limassol.

In September 2020, a Human Rights Watch report alleged that Cyprus was not allowing incoming refugees to claim asylum as required under international law. Authorities were reported to have instead abandoned hundreds refugees and migrants at sea without fuel and food, and in some cases beaten by police.

In December 2020, a decree was passed by interior minister Nicos Nouris that forebode any asylum seekers from establishing permanent residency in the village of Chloraka. A series of brawls that took place in the village in January 2022, one of which involved two police officers firing warning shots, has caused concern among local residents over shifting demographics. A protest attended by members of parliament supported the deportation of the asylum seekers, with community leader Nicos Liasides asserting that "the situation has reached the point of no return".

== LGBT rights ==
Homosexuality was decriminalized in 1998 after the case of Modinos v. Cyprus of the European Court of Human Rights. The Cyprus military used to ban homosexuals from serving on psychological grounds, but the ground of exclusion has been removed.

== Human rights violations due to Cyprus dispute ==
=== Violations in Northern Cyprus ===
In a number of cases, the European Court of Human Rights has found Turkey responsible for continuous violations of the European Convention on Human Rights in the Republic of Cyprus as a result of the Turkish Invasion in 1974 and continuous occupation of 37% of its territory. In particular, in the 2011 landmark case of Cyprus v. Turkey the court ruled that there had been 14 violations of the European Convention on Human Rights by Turkey:

- Violations of Articles 2, 3 and 5 concerning Greek-Cypriot missing persons and their relatives;
- Violations of Articles 8, 13 and P1-1 concerning home and property of displaced Greek-Cypriots;
- Violations of Articles 3, 8, 9, 10, 13, P1-1 and P1-2 concerning living conditions of Greek Cypriots in Karpas region of northern Cyprus;
- Violation of Article 6, concerning rights of Turkish Cypriots living in northern Cyprus;

In 2011, in its annual report, the UN Commission on Human Rights has reiterated its calls for the full restoration of all human rights to the population of Cyprus, in particular to refugees, called for the tracing of and accounting for missing persons in Cyprus without any further delay, and called for the restoration and respect of the human rights and fundamental freedoms of all Cypriots, including freedom of movement, the freedom of settlement and the right to property.

== Other issues ==
The constant focus on the division of the island sometimes masks other human rights issues. In 2005, Bulgarian citizens living in Northern Cyprus were not allowed to pass the Green Line and vote in Bulgarian elections.

== See also ==
- Freedom of religion in Cyprus
- Human rights in Northern Cyprus
- Internet censorship and surveillance in Cyprus
- LGBT rights in Cyprus
- Cyprus in the European Union
