= Financial Mirror =

Weekly business newspaper in Cyprus

- Type: Weekly newspaper
- Publisher: Masis der Parthogh
- Founded: 1993
- Headquarters: Nicosia, Cyprus
- Website: financialmirror.com

The Financial Mirror is an independent weekly business newspaper in Cyprus. Established in 1993, it is published every Saturday and complies with the Interior Ministry's Press and Information Office regulations for media, with a website and social media presence.

The main paper is published in English, with sections in the past in Greek and Russian. It is printed on salmon-pink newsprint in tabloid format. It used to publish a supplement in Greek (called Chrima & Agora, Xρήμα & Aγορά), as well as a standalone weekly sister publication in Greek up to 2003 (OIKONOMIKI).

The newspaper has survived and witnessed key events in the recent political and economic history of Cyprus, including the stock exchange boom and bust in 1999–2001, EU accession and referendum in 2004, the Mari explosion in 2011, the banking crisis and Troika bailout in 2013 and the Covid pandemic of 2020–2021.

The newspaper's main focus is business, finance, energy and shipping.

== Contributors ==
The editorial team comprises the publisher Masis der Parthogh, Editor Charlie Charalambous and lead reporter Kyriacos Kiliaris. Contributors include energy expert Charles Ellinas, economist Fiona Mullen, former CIIM Director Jim Leontiades, CIIM finance professor Olga Kandinskaia, former Finance Minister Michael Sarris, and many more.

== See also ==
- List of newspapers in Cyprus
