= TAK-Cyprus =

Turkish Agency Cyprus Türk Ajansı Kıbrıs
- Industry: News agency
- Founded: 21 December 1973; 52 years ago
- Founder: Sait Terzioğlu
- Headquarters: Lefkoşa, Turkish Republic of Northern Cyprus
- Key people: Dr. Fehmi Gürdallı (Director-General)
- Website: tak.gov.ct.tr

TAK, Türk Ajansı Kıbrıs (in English, Turkish News Agency-Cyprus) is the news agency in the Turkish Republic of Northern Cyprus responsible for disseminating TRNC news internationally and disseminating foreign news in the TRNC.

== History and Evolution ==
TAK was established on December 21, 1973, by journalist Mr. Sait Arif Terzioğlu. TAK is managed by a 7-member Administrative Council and is "devoted to the principles of righteousness and impartiality in its dissemination of news both externally and internally".

== Service areas ==
Turkish Republic of Northern Cyprus Press, Bayrak Radio TV Cooperation (BRTK) and other local TV channels and radios, newspapers in Turkey, Anadolu News Agency (AA), Turkish Radio and Television Corporation (TRT), foreign agencies and the member branches of the TRNC Government all benefit from the TAK news services.

== Relations with foreign agencies ==
TAK provides news to the international news agencies-- Reuters, AP, Agence France-Presse, IRNA and receives news from Reuters. TAK is also the founding member of the Union of the Turkish Speaking Countries News Agencies (TKA).

== Attitude to TAK by Republic of Cyprus ==
News reports from TAK that are quoted by the Republic of Cyprus government is preceded with the phrase 'Illegal TAK News Agency'.
