= Makhi =

Newspaper

Makhi Μάχη
- Type: Daily newspaper
- Format: broadsheet
- Founded: 1960
- Political alignment: Greek nationalism Right-wing populism Conservatism
- Headquarters: Nicosia, Cyprus

Makhi (Greek: Μάχη, meaning "Battle" or "Struggle") is a Greek-language Cypriot daily newspaper with close affiliation to radical right-wing and nationalist ideas. It was founded in 1960 by journalist and former EOKA gunman Nikos Sampson, as the voice of his "Progressive Front", a nationalist party.

Historically it has expressed the Enosis view, urging for a complete union to motherland Greece and with a strong anti-colonialist, anti-marxist and anti-Turkish orientation. During the Grivas-Makarios controversy, which dominated the Cypriot politics in the early 1970s, the newspaper fully supported Georgios Grivas and EOKA-B against Archbishop Makarios III, who held the presidency and was seen by Greek military junta of 1967-1974 as a pro-communist.

The events of 1974, which culminated in the Turkish invasion of Cyprus isolated Sampson's followers and the newspaper lost nearly all the political influence it had once gathered.

In the late 1990s the paper has moderated its views, and supported Glafkos Clerides and the Democratic Rally party. It is now owned by Sotiris Sampson, son of Nikos Sampson, who is a member of the Cyprus parliament.

Without abandoning its nationalist view, the paper nowadays reflects the views of Democratic Rally (DISY) dissidents who were opposed to the Annan Plan, against party consensus.

It also staunchly opposes the entrance of Turkey to the European Union, and supports the full withdrawal of the Turkish armed forces from the occupied Cypriot territory, either through diplomacy or though military action.

== See also ==
List of newspapers in Cyprus
