= Alithia =

- Cover of 6 February 2008 edition
- Type: Daily newspaper
- Format: Tabloid
- Publisher: Alithia Publishing Group
- Editor: Frixos Koulermos
- Founded: 1952
- Political alignment: Centre-right
- Language: Greek
- Headquarters: Nicosia, Cyprus
- Circulation: 11,000 daily
- Website: alithia.com.cy/

Alithia (Greek: Η Αλήθεια, meaning "The Truth") is one of the largest newspapers by circulation in Cyprus, with about 11,000 copies daily. It is headquartered in Nicosia and connected with the leadership of the conservative Democratic Rally party. According to the advertisement published in the Phileleftheros newspaper on 24 August 2014, citing as a source the company RAI Consultants, the Alithia Sunday issue's circulation in May 2014 was 6,722, and therefore it came sixth. Alithia published its first issue as a weekly on 5 December 1880 in Limassol. Therefore, it is the oldest still-circulating Greek paper on the island. In 1982, it became a daily publication.

== See also ==
List of newspapers in Cyprus
