= Ziligurti =

- Editor: -
- Categories: Humour
- Frequency: Monthly
- First issue: 2005
- Final issue: 2006 December
- Company: none
- Country: North Cyprus - Cyprus
- Language: Turkish
- Website: http://www.ziligurti.net

Ziligurti was a humour magazine published monthly in North Cyprus between 2005 and 2006.

== History and profile ==
Ziligurti was the first humour magazine in North Cyprus. The magazine was published monthly by Cyprus youth. It contained political issues, writings and caricatures. There are articles about daily problems. Zilligurti offered insight on issues such as honest humanism towards the public.

Mehmet Ekin Vaiz, Uluç Çağrı Kabataş, Mustafa Aknar, Hüda Avşaroğlu and their friends published Ziligurti.
