= Kutlu Adalı =

Turkish Cypriot journalist, poet, researcher, and peace advocate

- Born: 1935; Nicosia, British Cyprus
- Died: 6 July 1996 (aged 60–61); Nicosia, Cyprus
- Occupations: Author, Journalist

Kutlu Adalı (1935 in Nicosia – 6 July 1996) was a Turkish Cypriot journalist, poet, socio-political researcher and peace advocate. He worked for the left-wing Yeni Düzen and was critical of the then right-wing establishment. In July 1996, he was fatally machine-gunned, outside his home in the style of an execution. In 2021, Sedat Peker mentioned that Mehmet Ağar, the former Ministry of the Interior demanded a hitman and he sent his brother Atilla Peker.

== Early life and education ==
Kutlu Adalı was born in 1935 in Nicosia.

His family emigrated to Antalya, Turkey, when he was three years old. After completing his secondary education, he returned Cyprus in 1954 taking up employment at Cyprus Turkish Communal Chamber.

== Career ==
In the years leading to his assassination, Kutlu Adali was a well-respected journalist working for the left-wing Yeni Düzen newspaper in Nicosia, writing daily in his regular column From Blue Cyprus. While his early works, including his books and periodicals, were nationalistic in content, his latter contributions were critical of the then right-wing establishment prevalent in the north of his home island.

Before his retirement, he was the head of the Department of Population and Birth Registration in the recently declared Turkish Republic of North Cyprus.

== Personal life and death ==
On 6 July 1996 he was fatally machine-gunned, outside his home. To this day, the perpetrators of this crime are yet to be brought to justice. Some sources state the Grey Wolves are responsible for his death, however another source states the Turkish Revenge Brigade is responsible.

On 23 May 2021 Turkish criminal leader Sedat Peker mentioned the former Ministry of the Interior Mehmet Ağar's role in the killing on his YouTube channel, claiming that Ağar demanded a hitman from Peker. He said that he sent his brother Atilla Peker to Cyprus upon Ağar's request, but later was told by Korkut Eken that "another team killed Adalı."

== Bibliography ==
- Köy Raporları (Village Reports), 1961, 1962, 1963 (Turkish)
- Dağarcık (Shepherd's Bag), 1963, (travelogue) (Turkish)
- Söyleşi (Interview), 1968, (Turkish)
- Çirkin Politikacı (The Ugly Politician), Pof, 1969 (satire) (Turkish)
- Hayvanistan (Animalistan), 1969 (satire) (Turkish)
- Sancılı Toplum (Society with Birth Pains), 1969 (Turkish)
- Köprü (The Bridge), 1969, (play) (Turkish)
- Şago, 1970, (play) (Turkish)
- Nasrettin Hoca ve Kıbrıs (Naseruddin Hodja and Cyprus), 1971 (Turkish)

== See also ==
- List of journalists killed in Europe
- List of unsolved murders
