= Kıbrıs Postası =

Online Newspaper

- Type: Daily newspaper
- Format: online
- Owner: Citypress Yayıncılık Ltd.
- Publisher: Polat Alper
- Editor: Canan Onurer
- Founded: 2001
- Headquarters: Nicosia, Cyprus
- Website: www.kibrispostasi.com

Kıbrıs Postası (Turkish for The Cyprus Post) is a daily newspaper in Northern Cyprus owned by Citypress Yayıncılık Ltd. It has been published since 22 November 2001 and has the largest online readership of any Turkish Cypriot newspaper.

== See also ==
- List of newspapers in Cyprus
- List of newspapers in Northern Cyprus
