= Ibrahim Aziz (political analyst) =

Turkish Cypriot political analyst

Ibrahim Aziz (born 1938) is a Turkish Cypriot political analyst based in Nicosia, Republic of Cyprus. Aziz was the president of the New Cyprus Association in 1998. He is a former member of AKEL.

Although a citizen of the Republic of Cyprus residing in the government-controlled area, he was not allowed to vote for forty years because he was a Turkish Cypriot. In 2004, he applied to the European Court of Human Rights, which ruled:

Consequently, the applicant, as a member of the Turkish–Cypriot community living in the Government-controlled area of Cyprus, was completely deprived of any opportunity to express his opinion in the choice of the members of the house of representatives of the country of which he was a national and where he had always lived. Considering that the very essence of the applicant's right to vote, as guaranteed by Article 3 of Protocol No. 1, had been denied, the Court held, unanimously, that there had been a violation of Article 3 of Protocol No. 1.

Following this case, Turkish Cypriots residing in the Republic of Cyprus were granted the right to vote. However, Turkish Cypriots are still unable to run in presidential elections, and those residing in Northern Cyprus cannot vote in elections, despite being citizens of the Republic of Cyprus.

== Works ==
- Ibrahim Aziz (2011), "Ματιά στο Παρασκήνιο" [A Look at the Backstage], Nicosia

== See also ==
- Human rights in Cyprus
