= Politis (Cyprus) =

Cypriot Greek-language daily newspaper

- Type: Daily newspaper
- Format: Berliner
- Owner: Arktinos Ltd
- Editor: Dionysis Dionysiou
- Founded: 1999
- Headquarters: Nicosia, Cyprus
- Website: www.politis.com.cy

Politis (Greek: Πολίτης, meaning "Citizen") is a daily Greek-language daily national newspaper published in Cyprus. It is the second-largest (by circulation) Greek-language newspaper on the island, with about 7,000 copies sold daily, or about 8% of the market.

Politis maintains a free and subscription based online presence at politis.com.cy, and a radio station with both live online streaming and FM transmission in Cyprus.

== See also ==
- List of newspapers in Cyprus
