= Star Kıbrıs =

Star Kıbrıs (Star Cyprus) is a daily newspaper published in Northern Cyprus. It was established in 2007 by Ali Özmen Safa.

== See also ==
- List of newspapers in Northern Cyprus
