= Haravgi =

Greek language newspaper published in Cyprus

- Type: Daily newspaper
- Format: broadsheet
- Owner: Telegraphos Publishing Company Ltd
- Founded: 1956; 70 years ago
- Political alignment: Left-wing
- Headquarters: Nicosia, Cyprus
- OCLC number: 50696908
- Website: dialogos.com.cy/haravgi/

Haravgi (Greek: Χαραυγή / "Dawn") is a Greek language newspaper published in Cyprus since 1956. It is one of the largest newspapers on the island and is affiliated to AKEL, the Progressive Party of Working People. Haravgi reports daily on local and international political developments, financial issues, sports, culture, environment, entertainment etc. Its Sunday edition contains reviews on culture and new technologies while its Monday edition is mainly sports oriented. Once a month it includes a youth magazine given at no extra cost.

== See also ==
- List of newspapers in Cyprus
