= Star International =

Newspaper published in Cyprus

Star International is a weekly English language newspaper published in Northern Cyprus. It was formed from two separate newspapers, Cyprus Star and Turkey Star, both published weekly and owned by the Star Kibris Media Group. It was started in April 2008 and the current editor is Dan Gibson.
