= Bayrak =

State funded public broudcaster in Northern Cyprus

Bayrak Radio and Television Corporation
- Native name: Bayrak Radyo Televizyon Kurumu
- Founded: 25 December 1963
- Headquarters: North Nicosia, Turkish Republic of Northern Cyprus
- Key people: Meryem Özkurt (General Manager) Salih Can Doratli (Chairman) Eray Göksoylu (Vice Chairman)
- Owner: Government of the Turkish Republic of Northern Cyprus
- Website: www.brtk.net

BRT's fifth and previous logo from 2009 to 2014

Bayrak Radio and Television Corporation (Turkish: Bayrak Radyo Televizyon Kurumu; BRT, Bayrak means flag or banner in Turkish), is the state-funded public broudcaster in the Turkish Republic of Northern Cyprus. It operates BRT1 and BRT2.

== History ==
The establishment of BRT dates back to the events of December 1963 when intercommunal violence between the Greek and Turkish communities effectively ended the cooperative Republic of Cyprus splitting the island into two as north and south. Until that time, the Cyprus Broadcasting Corporation (CyBC) was run by Greek Cypriots with minority participation by Turkish Cypriots, who had no independent news source and had to depart from CyBC as the inter communal issues became more violent.

Bayrak Radio was established on 25 December 1963 to voice the cause of Turkish Cypriots. Bayrak Radio began as a clandestine homemade station, put together with a few pieces of homemade electrical equipment, which was powered by a car battery. It started transmitting within a limited radius of 2.5 km from a small garage in the backyard of a house in Nicosia. By February 1964, Radio Bayrak's transmission could be listened to from across the whole island.

By 1966 Bayrak Radio was broadcasting in Turkish, English and Greek on a single channel. After that, it had expanded to broadcast through two channels. Despite its limited means, Radio Bayrak continued to be the voice of Turkish Cypriots. Following the Turkish Military Invasion in 1974, after a coup d'état by the Greek Army, the Cypriot National Guard and the Greek Military Junta of 1967–1974 in Cyprus, Bayrak Radio was restructured into a corporation.

Carrying out its first black and white television broadcast on 19 July 1976 - with studio equipment dismantled and brought in from Diyarbakir, Turkey - Bayrak Radio took on its current name of Bayrak Radio and Television Corporation. The transmission went to (PAL) colour in 1979. As from March 1983, it began transmitting in Stereo FM Radio.

Bayrak's television transmitter operated from Sina Oros on VHF channel 8; said transmitter was formerly operated by the Cyprus Broadcasting Corporation until the Turkish invasion of the north.

BRTK produces its own news with the aim of distributing information about the Turkish Cypriots throughout the world via satellite, also via the internet. The quality of its internet broadcasting has been increased accordingly. Interested people can read and hear the news in English, Greek, Russian, German, and Arabic on certain hours of the day.

BRTK has been autonomous since 1983.

In addition to the Turkish language BRT 1 and the mainly English language BRT 2 Television channels, BRTK also operates five radio stations: Bayrak Radio, Bayrak FM, Bayrak International, Bayrak Classic FM and Bayrak Turkish Music.

BRTK launched its internet website in 1997. In addition to the internet, BRT 1 TV, Bayrak Radio and Bayrak International can be watched and listened internationally via satellite.

== Programming information ==
BRTK broadcasts news, sports, arts, women's hour, talks, educational, cultural, entertainment and other social events programmes on both TV and Radio.

Bayrak Radio transmits on three stations: Channel I for broadcasts in Turkish, Channel II for foreign language programmes (mainly English and Greek), and Channel III for music.

== Online services ==
Bayrak's web site now has live feeds that enable internet users to watch Bayrak TV and listen to Bayrak radio channels.

== Status within Republic of Cyprus ==
The internationally recognised Republic of Cyprus government regards BRT as a 'pirate broadcaster,' and prefaces any quotes from BRT in their own news releases with the phrase 'Illegal Bayrak Television.' It is common practise for the Republic of Cyprus to call many Turkish Cypriot establishments illegal.
