= Diyalog =

Diyalog (Turkish for "dialogue") is a daily newspaper published in Northern Cyprus. Its first issue was published on 4 December 2013. Its editor in chief is Reşat Akar, who also owns 20% of the newspaper; the remaining 80% is owned by Net Holding. For the first months of its publishing, it gained a foothold on the market using promotional campaigns such as the delivery of lottery tickets as gifts. It is institutionally related to Diyalog TV.

== See also ==
- List of newspapers in Northern Cyprus
