= Kıbrıs (newspaper) =

Daily newspaper published in Northern Cyprus

Kıbrıs (meaning Cyprus) is a daily newspaper published in Northern Cyprus. It has been published since 1989. Its editor in chief is Uğur Kaptanoğlu and its owner is Asil Nadir. It has by far the highest circulation in the country. Its former editor in chief Reşat Akar went on to create the Diyalog newspaper.

== See also ==
- List of newspapers in Northern Cyprus
