= Yeni Düzen =

Daily newspaper published in Northern Cyprus

Yeni Düzen or Yenidüzen is a daily newspaper published in Northern Cyprus. Its current editor in chief is Cenk Mutluyakalı. As of July 2014, it consisted of 24 pages and its daily circulation was 4700.

== Affiliation and ownership ==
The newspaper belongs to the Republican Turkish Party (CTP). It is under the United Media Group along with its sister television channel, Kanal Sim. Regarding its political point of view, Mutluyakalı has stated that while it is nominally owned by the CTP and is a "side" to current events, the newspapers follows an independent line and at times publishes material that is upsetting for the CTP. Its basic political line of thought centers around its struggle for a united Cyprus and an immediate solution for the Cyprus dispute. Mutluyakalı claims that there is no interference or supervision from the party regarding the newspaper's content. Journalist Hasan Hastürer has written that the newspaper differs from other party-owned newspapers in Northern Cyprus and that the journalists do not see themselves as the defenders of the party.

== History ==
Its first issue was published on 12 December 1975. Its first editor in chief was Zihni Durmuş and the early issues of the newspaper included commentaries by prominent figures in the CTP such as Mithat Berberoğlu, Naci Talat and Özker Özgür. It was first published as a weekly broadsheet until 16 July 1976, when the publication stopped for two years. On 28 December 1978, the publication resumed as a tabloid, in 1980, the newspaper built its own printing house and on 12 December 1983, the newspaper started being published daily.

Özker Özgür wrote a column titled "Babalar" ("The Fathers") on 16 December 1985 in the newspaper, which resulted in Rauf Denktaş suing it for defamation. In December 1987, a court ruling demanded an astronomical amount of 200 million Turkish liras to be paid by the newspaper, upon the newspaper's failure to pay the sum, the police, accompanied by firefighters, came to the newspaper to confiscate its property, only to be met by a crowd of protesters. The resistance in front of the newspaper continued for five days. The sentence of the court was eventually suspended by a higher court, thereby ending the resistance.

In the 1990s, the newspaper often documented political scandals and corruption. In 1994, the newspaper was published with its current green logo for the first time. In the late 1990s, the newspaper went through severe financial difficulties, but with its increased popularity with the Annan Plan for Cyprus in 2004, it grew and was reorganized. In 2008, it became a part of the United Media Group and moved to its current modern headquarters.

== Notable staff or columnists ==
- Özker Özgür
- Kutlu Adalı
- Niyazi Kızılyürek
- Sevgül Uludağ
- Neşe Yaşın
