= Cyprus Observer =

English-language newspaper

The Cyprus Observer is a Turkish-Cypriot owned English-language weekly newspaper.

It is distributed for sale (also) in Britain and Turkey in addition to being on the internet.

It is published on Fridays in the Berliner format from its Kyrenia headquarters.

The newspaper is owned and edited by Hasan Ekcakica, who is also the official spokesman of the Turkish Cypriot administration.

In the past few years, more and more publications for the growing English-speaking population of North Cyprus are appearing on the scene. Not only does the Cyprus Observer, founded in August 2005, have a local circulation, but it is also sold in London, as well as having a web page which is updated weekly (www.observercyprus.com). In addition to British community news, the newspaper mainly covers political developments in the Cyprus Problem as well as business news, news from the South of the island, world news, Turkey news, etc.
