= Cyprus Today =

Cypriot newspaper

Cyprus Today is the leading English-language newspaper in North Cyprus. Founded on 12 October 1991, it is published weekly on Saturday and has a multi-national staff. The newspaper contains up-to-date stories from North Cyprus as well as international news, entertainment and sport.

The newspaper's Editor in Chief is Eltan Halil and Managing Coordinator is Maria Djemal.
