= Phileleftheros =

Cypriot newspaper

- Type: Daily newspaper
- Format: broadsheet
- Owner: Phileleftheros Publishing Group
- Publisher: Nicos Ch. Pattichis
- Editor-in-chief: Aristos Michaelides
- General manager: Tasos S. Anastasiou
- Founded: 1955
- Political alignment: Independent, liberal
- Language: Greek
- Headquarters: Nicosia, Cyprus
- Website: philenews.com

Phileleftheros is a pan-Cypriot daily newspaper based in Nicosia. It has been published continuously since 7 December 1955 and is considered the oldest continuously published daily newspaper in Cyprus. It was founded by Nikos Chr. Pattichis. The newspaper is printed at the Proteas Press printing house and circulates in Cyprus, Greece and countries with Cypriot diaspora communities. In June 2025, businessman Costas Kleanthous joined the Organisation as a strategic investor. Tasos S. Anastasiou was appointed Chief Executive Officer (CEO) of the Organisation. He has significant experience in corporate governance, having served as an executive advisor to listed public companies and other organizations. He is currently Chairman of the Board of the University of Cyprus.

== History ==
The newspaper's founder, Nikos Chr. Pattichis (1908–1974), was born in Larnaca and studied at the Law School of the University of Athens. Despite his legal studies, he turned to journalism. In the 1930s he published the newspapers Imerissia Nea, Kathimerina Fylla, Imerisios Tilégrafos and the evening newspaper Esperini (1937–1951).

In 1954 he began establishing a daily morning newspaper, which was finally launched in 1955 during the period of EOKA's liberation struggle. The publication operated under British censorship, whilst the first issue attracted interest due to a Reuters report on the Cyprus issue.

Over the following decades, Phileleftheros became one of the island's main newspapers, with emphasis on political and economic news coverage. Pattichis's principal collaborators were Michalakis Chadjiefthymiou (financial management) and Fifis Ioannou (chief editor). From 1965 and for many years, Christakis Katsampas served as chief editor. The newspaper maintained an independent political line, despite the fact that several of its staff came from the Left.

Following Pattichis's death in 1974, his son Christophoros N. Pattichis (1933–1995) assumed management of the newspaper.

== Modernisation and expansion ==
In the 1980s the newspaper was the first in Cyprus to introduce modern phototypesetting methods and later comprehensive electronic page-layout systems. The transition to offset printing was completed in the mid-1980s.

From 1987, Nikos Chr. Pattichis and Myrto Markides, grandchildren of the founder, joined the Organisation. Under their direction, the Organisation expanded into radio media, magazines and digital content.

The Organisation comprises divisions for print publications, digital production, radio content and commercial services. Activities expanded to include the Proteas Press printing house and the Kronos press distribution agency.

In June 2025, businessman Costas Cleanthous joined the Organisation as a strategic investor, with the stated aim of strengthening the newspaper's independence and credibility. In 2025, the Organisation launched new development plans to mark the publication's 70th anniversary.

== Contemporary activity ==
In 2025 the Organisation publishes:

- the daily newspaper Phileleftheros
- eight magazines: Down Town (lifestyle), TV Mania (television guide), Omicron (current affairs), Syntheseis (culture), Taste (food), Chryses Syntages (recipes), Insider (business) and Forbes Cyprus (business and finance)
- three radio stations: Sfera Radio 96.8, Kiss FM 89.0 and Active Radio 107.4/102.5

The Organisation manages digital portals, the most significant being Philenews.com, one of Cyprus's most popular news portals according to Google Analytics and SimilarWeb measurements. Content is updated in real time and includes news, analysis, financial data, international affairs and lifestyle coverage.

== Readership ==
Phileleftheros ranks amongst the most widely read daily newspapers in Cyprus.
