= Cenotaph =

Monument to a person whose remains are elsewhere

The Cenotaph, Whitehall, London

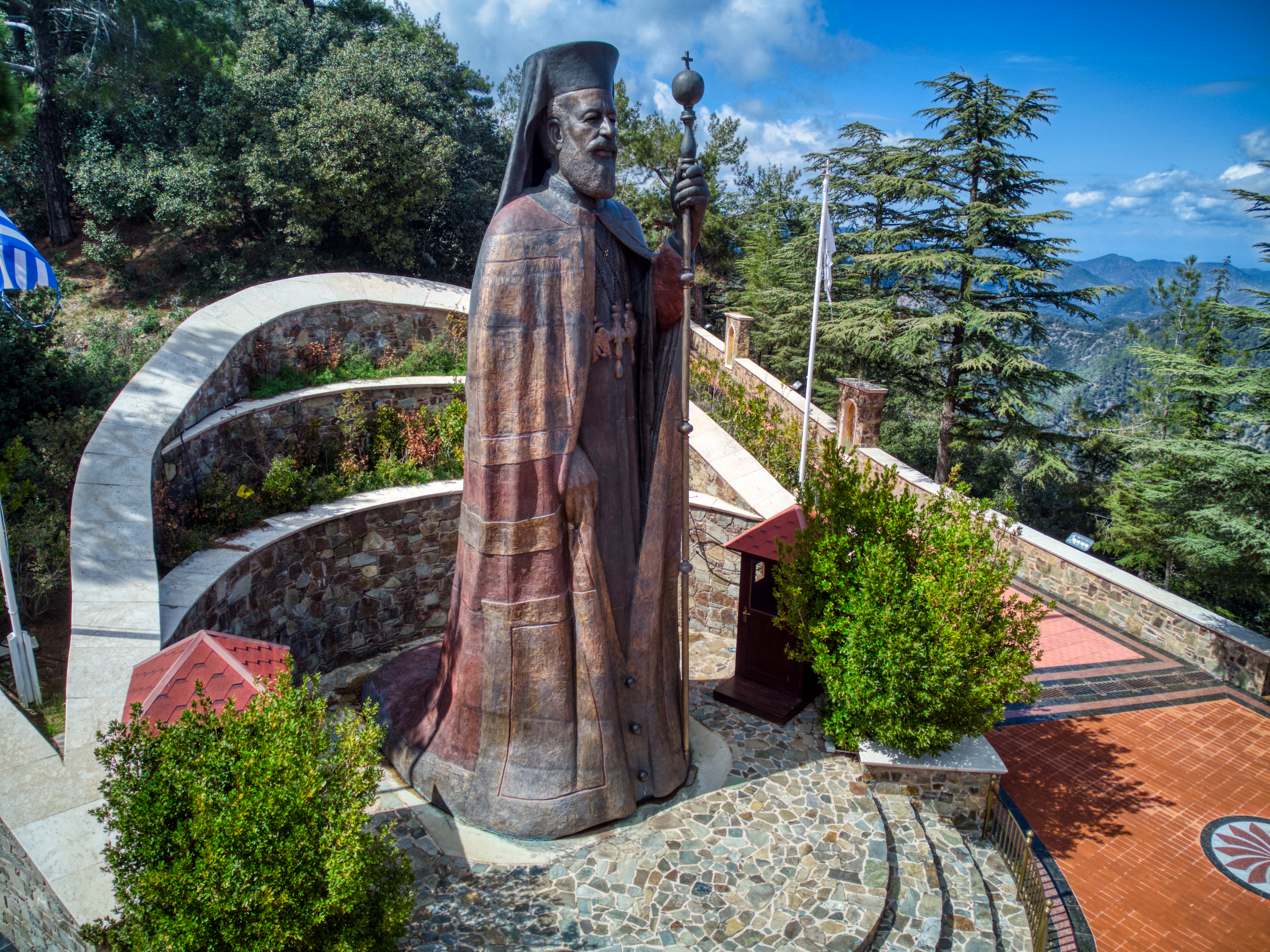
The statue of Archbishop Makarios III near the Kykkos Monastery in Cyprus

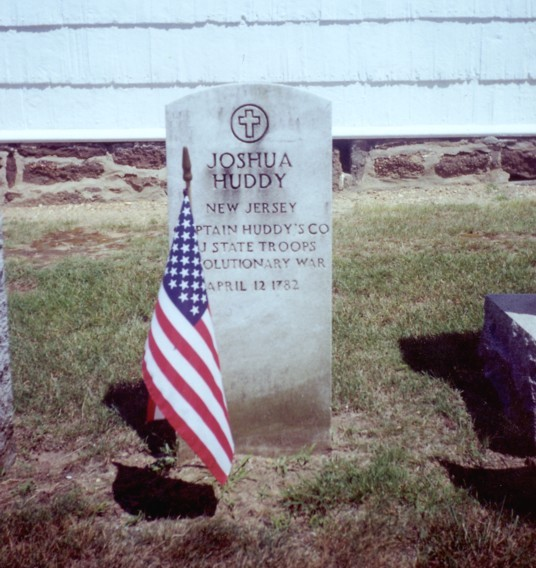
Cenotaph headstone for Joshua Huddy, Manalapan, New Jersey, US

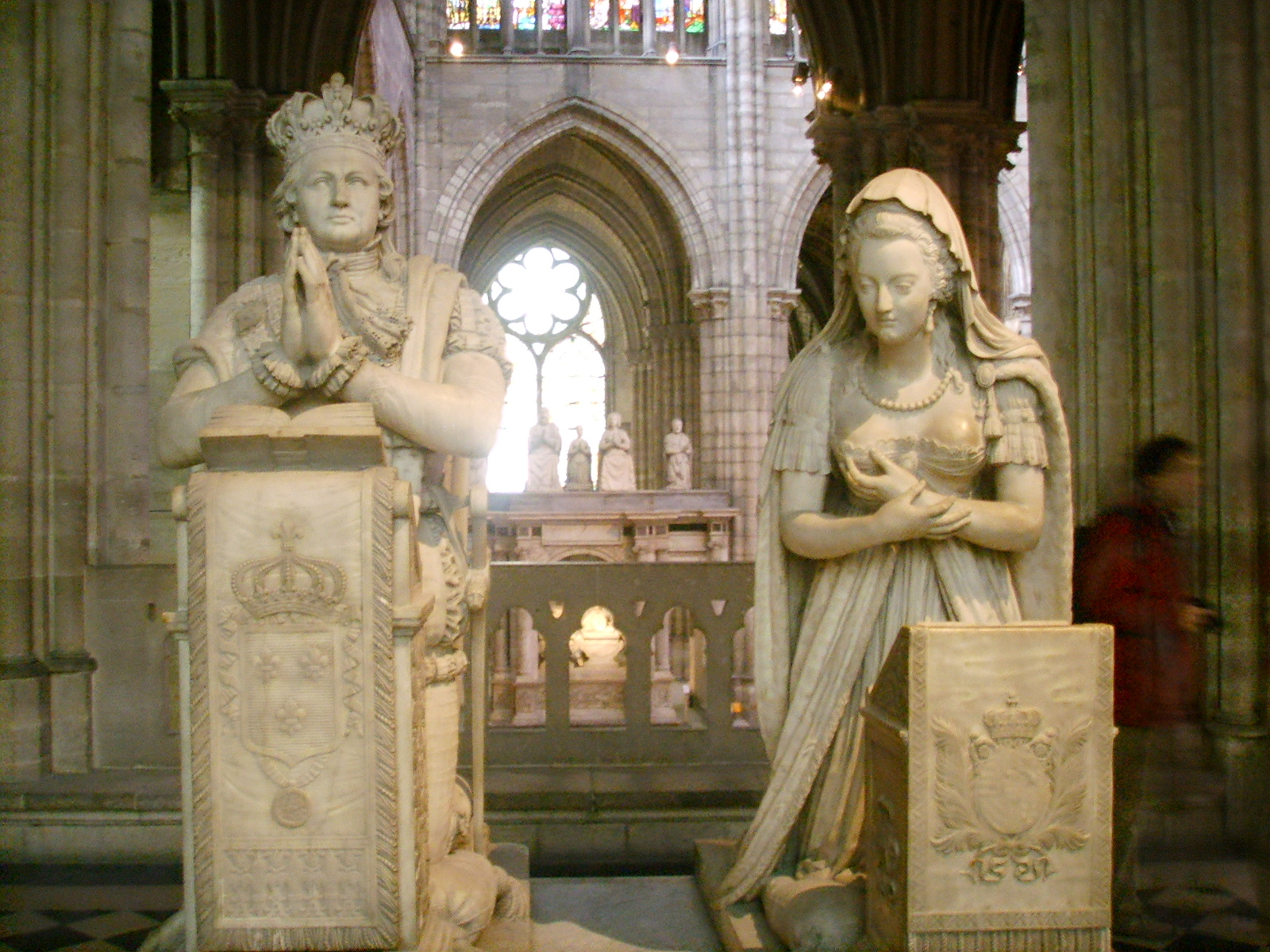
Cenotaph for Louis XVI and Marie Antoinette in the Basilique Saint-Denis, France

A cenotaph is an empty grave, tomb or a monument erected in honor of a person or group of people whose remains are elsewhere or have been lost. It can also be the initial tomb for a person who has since been reinterred elsewhere. Although the majority of cenotaphs honor individuals, many noted cenotaphs are also dedicated to the memories of groups of individuals, such as the lost soldiers of a country or of an empire.

== Etymology ==
"Cenotaph" means "empty tomb" and is derived from the Greek κενοτάφιον, kenotaphion, a compound word that is created from the morphological combination of two root words:

1. κενός, kenos meaning "empty"
2. τάφος, taphos meaning "tomb", from θαπτω, thapto, 'I bury'

== History ==
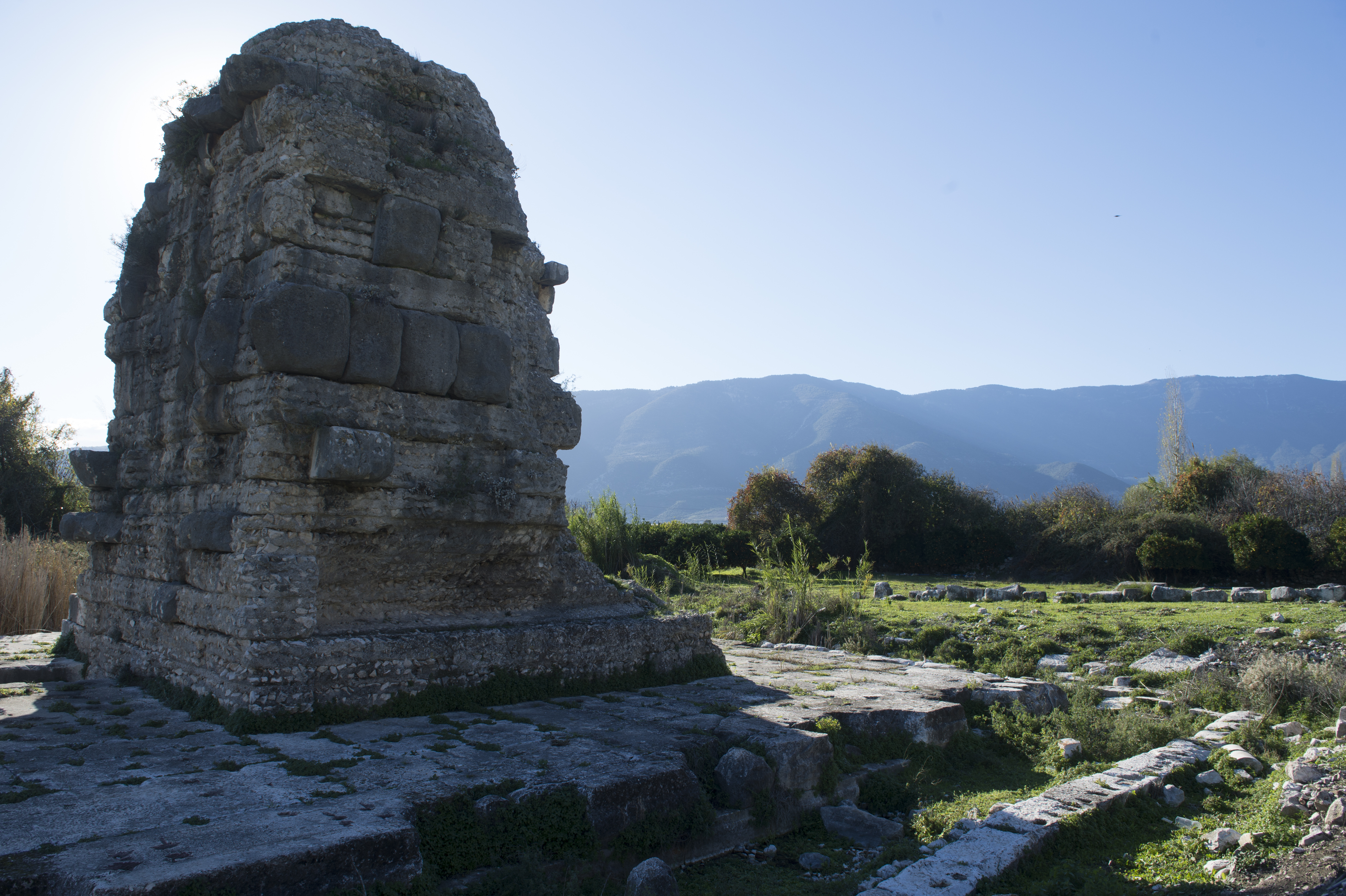
The Limyra cenotaph for Gaius Caesar, Turkey

Cenotaphs were common in the ancient world. Many were built in Ancient Egypt, Ancient Greece and across Northern Europe (in the shape of Neolithic barrows).

The cenotaph in Whitehall, London, designed in 1919 by Sir Edwin Lutyens, influenced the design of many other war memorials in Britain and in the British sectors of the Western Front, as well as those in other Commonwealth nations. Lutyens' cenotaph was chosen as a deliberately secular monument.

The Church of Santa Engrácia, in Lisbon, Portugal, turned into a National Pantheon in 1966, holds six cenotaphs, namely to Luís de Camões, Pedro Álvares Cabral, Afonso de Albuquerque, Nuno Álvares Pereira, Vasco da Gama and Henry the Navigator.

The Basilica di Santa Croce in Florence, Italy, contains a number of cenotaphs, including one for Dante Alighieri, who is buried in Ravenna.

== Regional ==
=== Africa ===
==== South Africa ====
Durban has a unique cenotaph made of granite and decorated with brightly coloured ceramics.

Gqeberha (its former name Port Elizabeth) has a cenotaph. Located on the edge of St George's Park in Rink Street, it was designed by Elizabeth Gardner to commemorate the men who died in the First World War (1914–1918) and was erected by the monumental mason firm of Pennachini Bros.

Cenotaphs are also located in the centres of Cape Town and Johannesburg.

==== Zambia ====
In Livingstone there is a cenotaph at the Eastern Cataract of The Victoria Falls with the names of the men of Northern Rhodesia who died during the Great War 1914–18. It was unveiled by Prince Arthur of Connaught on 1 August 1923.

There is also a cenotaph in Lusaka at Embassy Park, opposite the Cabinet Office along Independence Avenue, and commemorates those Zambians who fought and died in World Wars I & II. The cenotaph was commemorated in 1977.

=== Americas ===
==== Argentina ====
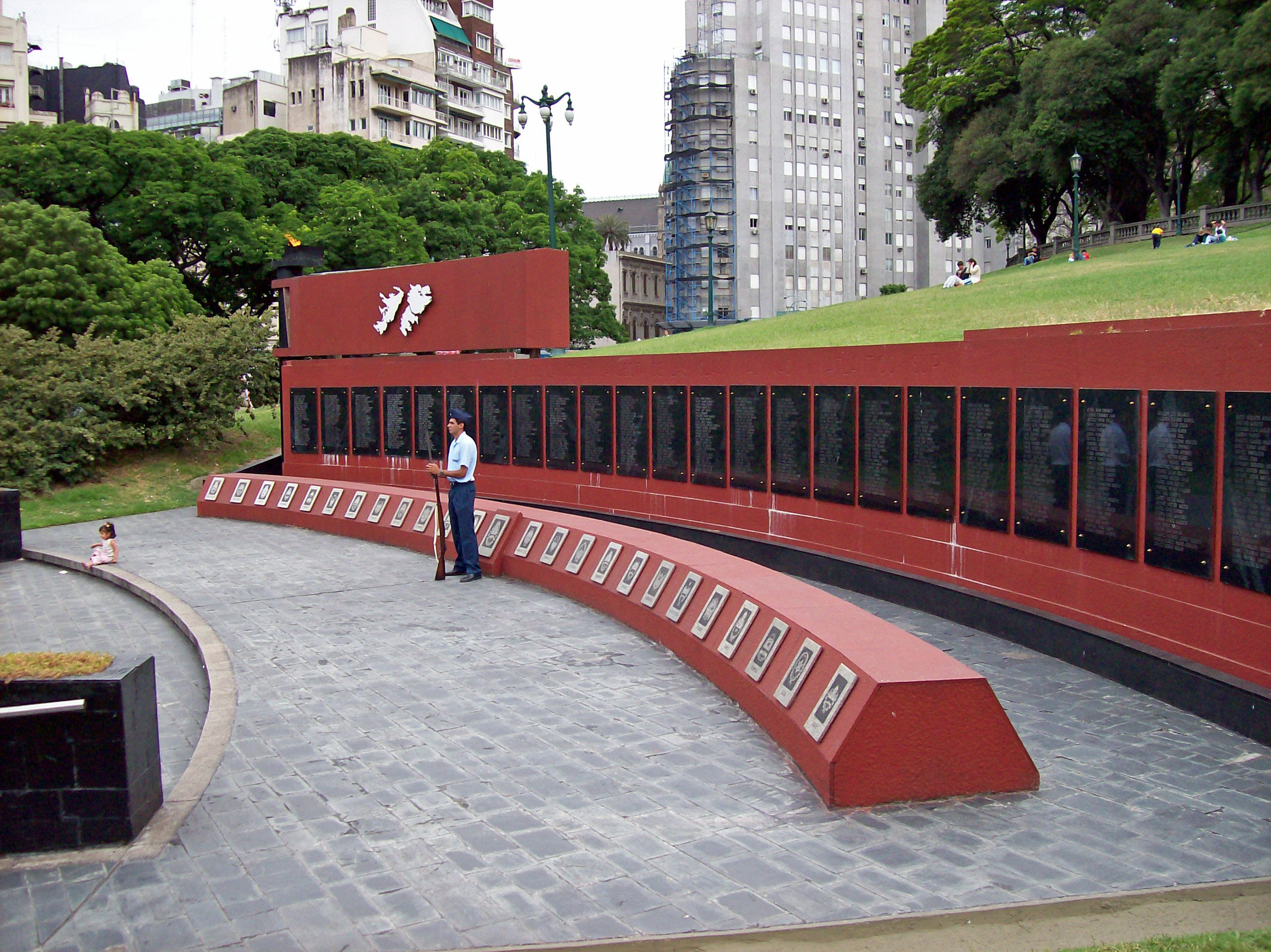
Monumento a los caídos en Malvinas (Monument for the fallen in the Falklands War) is located in Plaza San Martin.

A monument which has come to be known to as the "Cenotaph" was erected in Plaza San Martín, in downtown Buenos Aires, to commemorate the Argentinian soldiers who died during the Falklands War, in 1982. The monument consists of a series of plaques of black marble with the names of the fallen, surrounding a flame, and during the day is guarded by two soldiers.

Another cenotaph, which is a replica of the Argentine Military Cemetery in Darwin on the Falkland Islands, exists in Campo de Mayo, a large Army facility and training field just outside Buenos Aires.

==== Bermuda ====
A limestone replica of the Cenotaph at Whitehall in London was erected outside the Cabinet Building in Hamilton, Bermuda (with the cornerstone laid in 1920, and the completed monument unveiled in 1925).

==== Canada ====
In Canada, major cenotaphs commemorating the nation's war dead in World War I and later conflicts include the National War Memorial (a cenotaph surmounted by a bronze sculpture entitled The Response) in Ottawa; Montreal, Toronto, Hamilton, Victoria, St. John's, Halifax, and the Victory Square Cenotaph, in Vancouver, British Columbia.

==== Falkland Islands ====
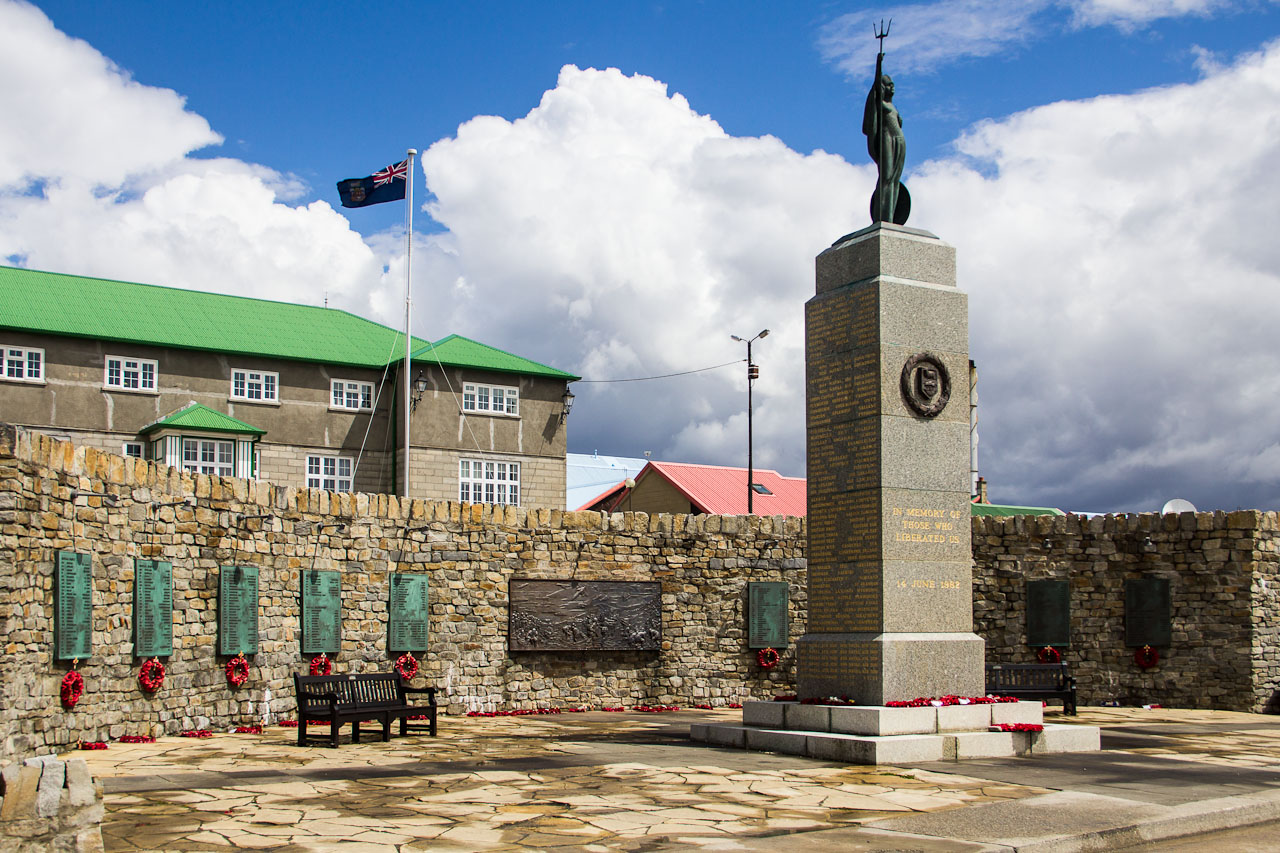
The Liberation Memorial situated in front of the Secretariat Building in Stanley, Falkland Islands, overlooking Stanley Harbour

In the Falkland Islands, there are several war memorials to commemorate those killed in the Falklands War in 1982. The main memorial for Falkland Islanders is the 1982 Liberation Memorial, a cenotaph erected in Stanley in 1984 which lists all the British Army regiments, RAF squadrons, Royal Navy vessels and the Royal Marine formations and units that took part in the conflict. The names of the 255 British military personnel who died during the war are listed on ten plaques behind the Memorial, divided into the service branches.

Services are held at the Memorial each year on 14 June (Liberation Day) and on Remembrance Sunday, with wreaths being laid at the foot of the Memorial.

==== United States ====
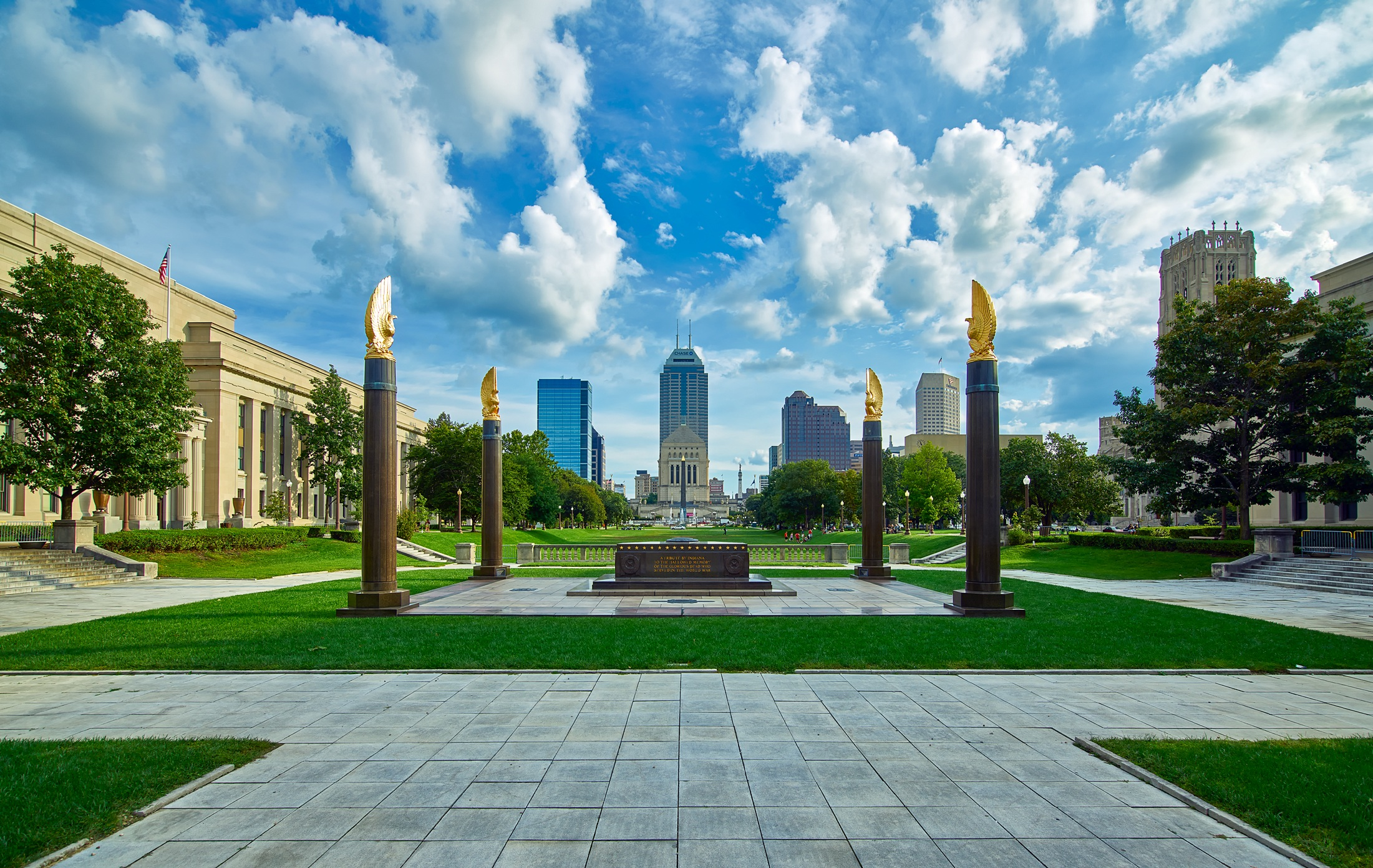
The Indiana World War Memorial contains a public cenotaph to honor James Bethel Gresham, perhaps the first member of the American Expeditionary Force killed in World War I.

In the United States, a cenotaph in Yale University's Hewitt Quad (or Beinecke Plaza) honours men of Yale who died in battle.

The Battle Monument in Baltimore, Maryland commemorates the Battle of Baltimore, the Battle of North Point on 12 September 1814, the Bombardment of Fort McHenry on 13–14 September, and the stand-off on Loudenschlager's Hill (now Hampstead Hill in Patterson Park). It has an Egyptian Revival cenotaph base, surmounted by a fasces bound together with ribbons bearing the names of the dead. It was designed by French émigré architect Maximilian Godefroy in 1815, and construction was completed in 1827. It is considered the first war memorial in America, and an early example of a memorial to individual soldiers. The Monument appears on the Seal and the Logo of the City of Baltimore, and serves as a symbol for any agencies of the municipal government.

A cenotaph for the defenders of the Battle of the Alamo (March 1836) stands in front of the Alamo mission chapel in San Antonio, Texas. The cenotaph is empty because the remains of the fallen were cremated.

Atop War Memorial Chapel at Virginia Tech, there is a cenotaph honouring all Virginia Tech cadets who have been killed in battle. Inscribed upon the cenotaph are the names of the seven Virginia Tech alumni who have been awarded the Medal of Honor.

Maya Lin's Memorial Wall in the Vietnam Veterans Memorial, inscribed with the names of the approximately 58,000 service members who died in the Vietnam War, is one of the most visited monuments in Washington, D.C.

In New London, Texas, a cenotaph stands dedicated to the more than 300 students and teachers killed in the New London School explosion on March 18, 1937, when a natural gas leak caused an explosion and destroyed the school.

=== Asia ===
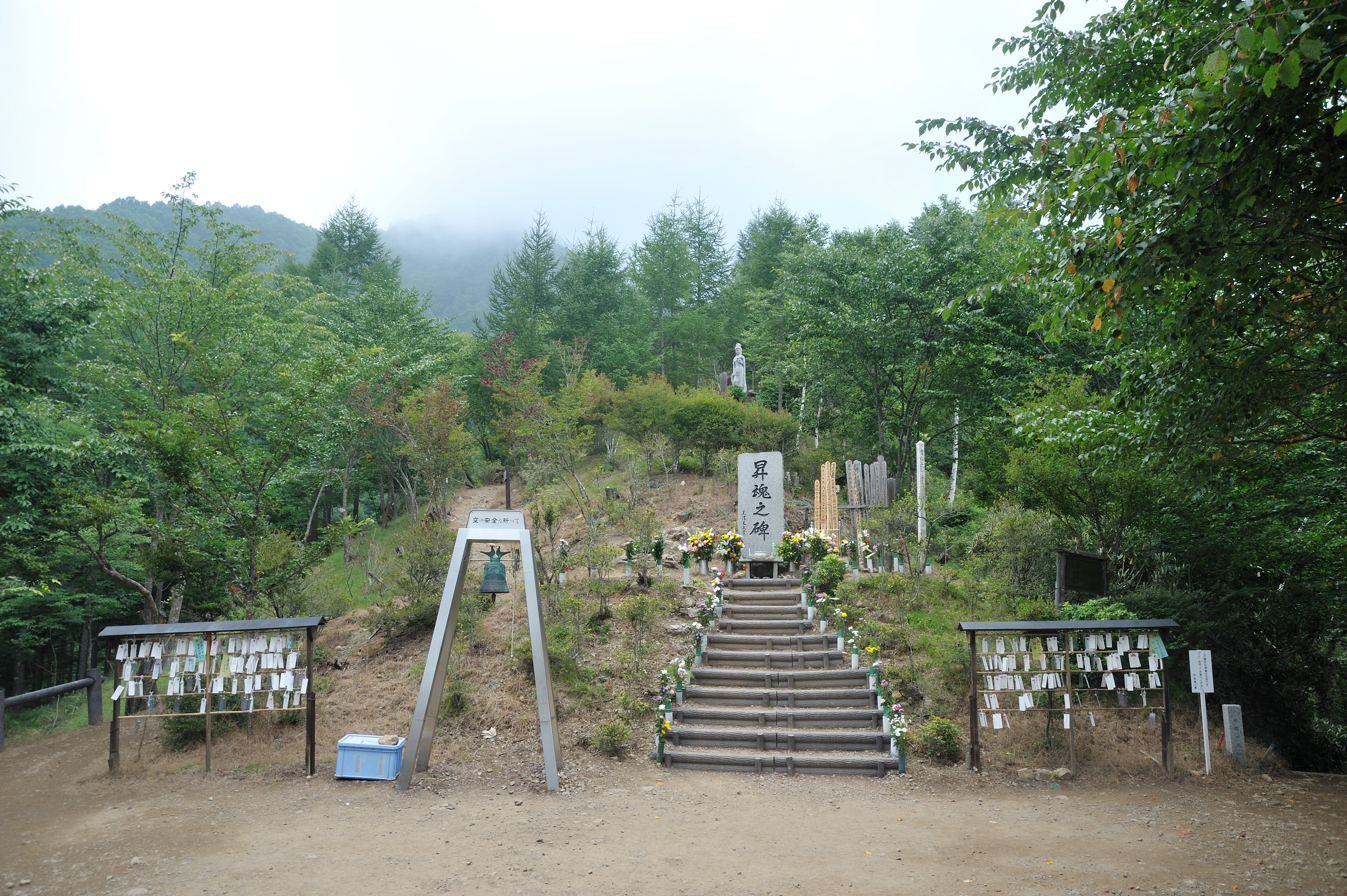
Cenotaph on Mount Takamagahara, Japan, built as a memorial to the victims of the crash of Japan Air Lines Flight 123

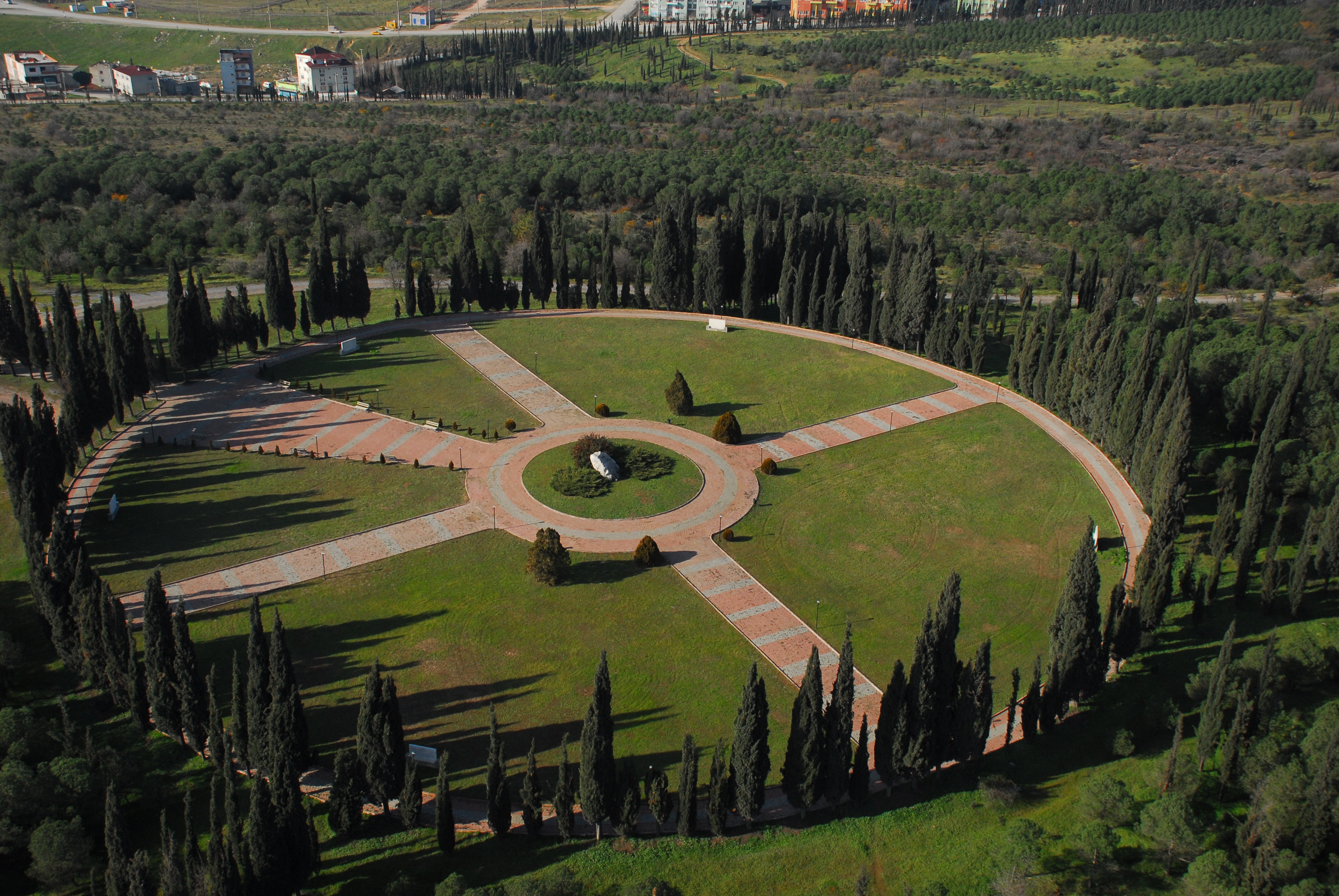
Hannibal's cenotaph in Kocaeli Province, Turkey

In Asia, the Cenotaph in Central District of Hong Kong Island, cenotaphs in Kuala Lumpur, George Town, Ipoh, Seremban and Jesselton in Malaysia, the Cenotaph in Singapore, the Cenotaph in Colombo and the stone Cenotaph in the new Allenby Square, Romema, Jerusalem–were erected as memorials to the war dead of World War I.

The concrete Memorial Cenotaph at the Hiroshima Peace Memorial Park was designed by Kenzo Tange to commemorate the victims of the August 1945 atomic bomb attacks. The cenotaph at the 228 Peace Memorial Park in Taipei, Taiwan, was erected as a memorial to the February 28 incident. In the Philippines, a cenotaph was erected inside the Manila North Cemetery in honour of the 24 Scouts who died in a plane crash en route to the 11th World Scout Jamboree.

A cenotaph at Khejarli, Rajasthan, India, memorializes the 363 Bishnoi martyrs who were massacred in 1730 while defending their local khejri trees.

In Kocaeli Province of Turkey there is a monumental cenotaph to memorialize the Carthaginian general and statesman Hannibal.

Ottoman-ruled Jerusalem surrendered to the British Egyptian Expeditionary Force under General Edmund Allenby during the Battle of Jerusalem in December 1917 during World War I. A cenotaph was erected in 1920 at the historical site of the surrender, later to be named Allenby Square. The inscription dedicates it to the fallen of the 60th London Division.

=== Europe ===
==== Belgium ====
The Interallied Memorial of Cointe, commissioned by FIDAC (The Interallied Federation of War Veterans Organisations) and built after World War I in Liège, is a complex consisting of a cenotaph with a tower as a secular monument and the Sacré-Cœur church as a religious building. Numerous monuments donated by Allied nations are displayed in the tower and on the adjoining esplanade.

==== France ====
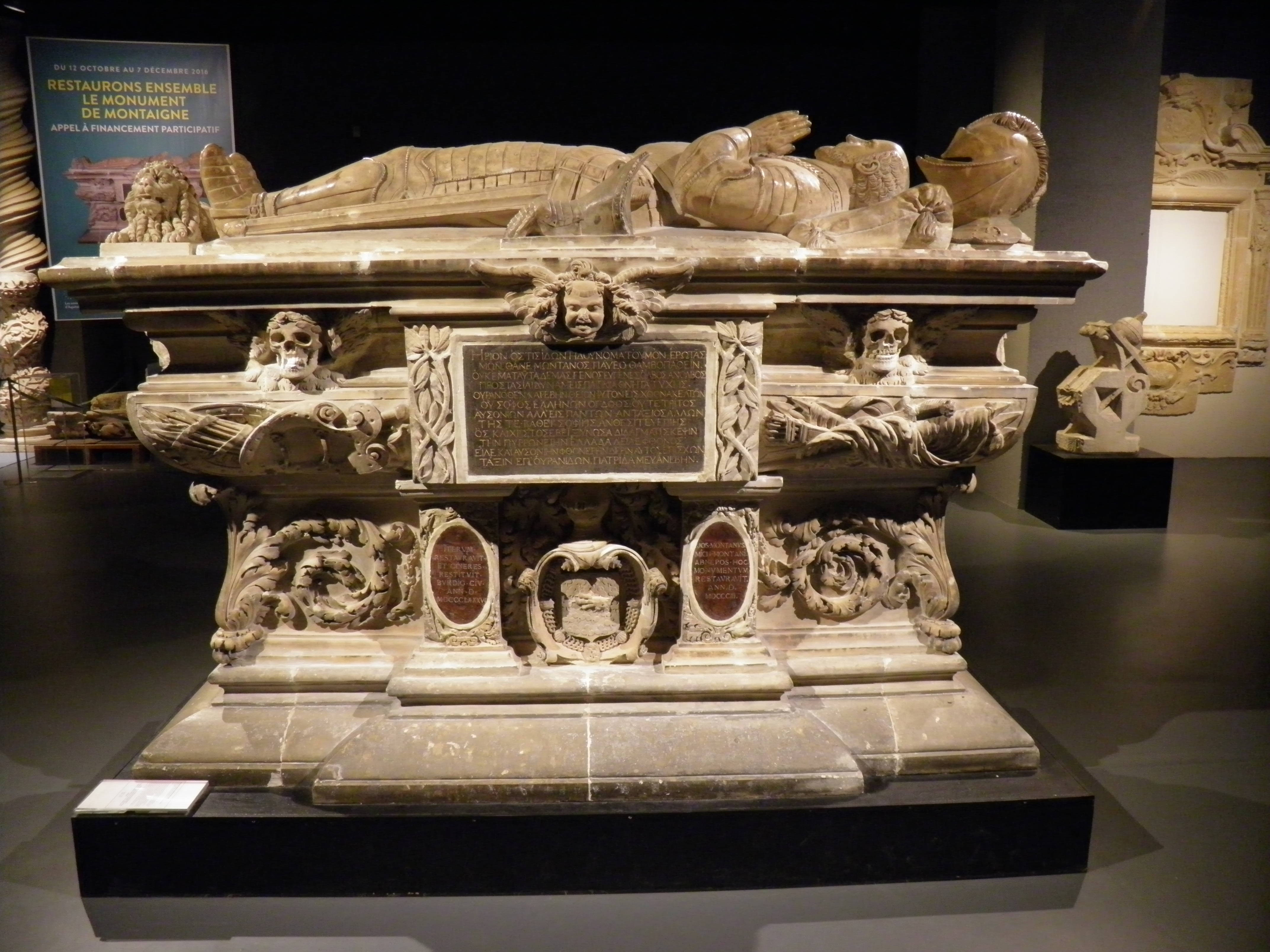
Cenotaph of Michel de Montaigne, Museum of Aquitaine, Bordeaux

In the Museum of Aquitaine, in Bordeaux, is the cenotaph of Michel de Montaigne, a French Renaissance writer and philosopher.

==== United Kingdom ====
A cenotaph in the UK that stands in Whitehall, London, was designed by Sir Edwin Lutyens and replaced Lutyens' identical wood-and-plaster cenotaph erected in 1919 for the Allied Victory Parade, and is a Grade I listed building. It is undecorated save for a carved wreath on each end and the words "The Glorious Dead", chosen by Lloyd George. It was intended to commemorate specifically the victims of the First World War, but is used to commemorate all of the dead in all wars in which British servicemen and women have fought. The dates of the First World War and the Second World War are inscribed on it in Roman numerals. The design was used in the construction of many other war memorials throughout the British Empire. The Cenotaph is used for annual Armistice Day and Remembrance Sunday Commemorations held every November where all political leaders and ex-prime ministers attend and lay a wreath in dedication to the fallen.

The Cenotaph in Belfast, Northern Ireland, is located in the grounds of Belfast City Hall and is set within a Garden of Remembrance. The Cenotaph is the site of the annual Northern Ireland memorial held on Remembrance Sunday, the closest Sunday to 11 November (Armistice Day).

=== Oceania ===
==== Australia ====
In Australia, Anzac Day commemorations are usually held at all of the nation's many war memorials, but not all of them are cenotaphs. Cenotaphs include the Hobart Cenotaph, the Sydney Cenotaph and the obelisk within the State War Memorial in Kings Park, Perth, Western Australia.

==== New Zealand ====
Anzac Day commemorations in New Zealand are also usually held at local war memorials. Cenotaphs include the Dunedin Cenotaph, the Wellington Cenotaph, the Auckland War Memorial Museum Cenotaph (a copy of the Whitehall Cenotaph) and the New Plymouth Cenotaph (also inspired by the Whitehall Cenotaph).

== Cenotaphs for the missing ==
Although most notable cenotaphs commemorate notable individuals buried elsewhere, many cenotaphs pay tribute to people whose remains have never been located, particularly those lost at sea. Some such cenotaphs are dedicated to victims of the RMS Titanic whose bodies were not recovered after the sinking. Although Isidor Straus's body was recovered, Ida Straus's body was not, and a cenotaph at the Straus Mausoleum at Woodlawn Cemetery in the Bronx is dedicated to Isidor and Ida together. The cenotaph of Major Archibald Butt, aide to U.S. President William Howard Taft, is located at Arlington National Cemetery.

In Inishmore, one of the Aran Islands of Ireland, drowning was formerly such a common cause of death for island fishermen that each family had a memorial to those lost at sea known as leachtaí cuimhneacháin (memorial cairns). Most were erected in the 19th century, although some date back to the eighteenth. A modern memorial was erected in 1997.

== Chhatris ==
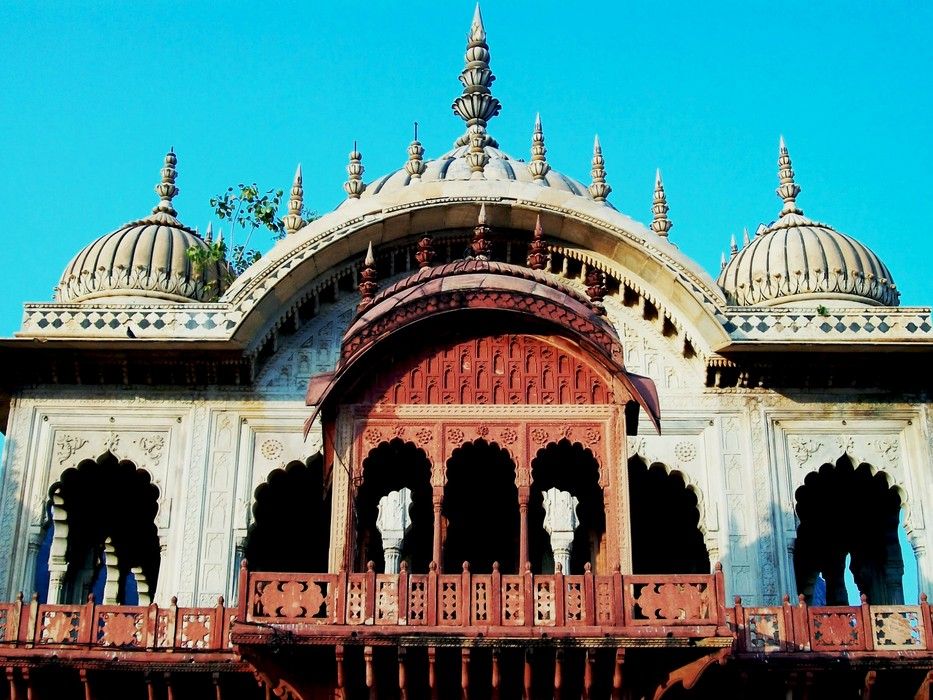
Moosi Rani ki Chatri, Alwar

In India, cenotaphs are a basic element of Hindu architecture, later used by Moghuls as seen in most of the mausoleums of Mughal Emperors which have two burial chambers, the upper one with a cenotaph, as in Humayun's Tomb, Delhi, or the Taj Mahal, Agra, while the real tomb often lies exactly below it, or further removed. The term chhatri, used for these canopylike structures, comes from Hindustani word literally meaning umbrella, and are found throughout the northwestern region of Rajasthan as well as in Madhya Pradesh and Maharashtra. In the Shekhawati region of Rajasthan, chhatris are built on the cremation sites of wealthy or distinguished individuals. Chhatris in Shekhawati may consist of a simple structure of one dome raised by four pillars to a building containing many domes and a basement with several rooms. In some places, the interior of the chhatri is painted in the same manner as the haveli.

== Art ==
Cenotaphs have also been the subject of a number of illustrations, including:

- The Cenotaph to Reynold's Memory (John Constable, c. 1833)
- Elevation for Newton's Cenotaph, Perspective (Etienne-Louis Boullée, c. 1785)
- The Cenotaph of Jean Jacques Rousseau (Hubert Robert, 1794)

== Digital ==
Virtual cenotaphs have been created in video games, including World of Warcraft and Ingress.

== Gallery ==
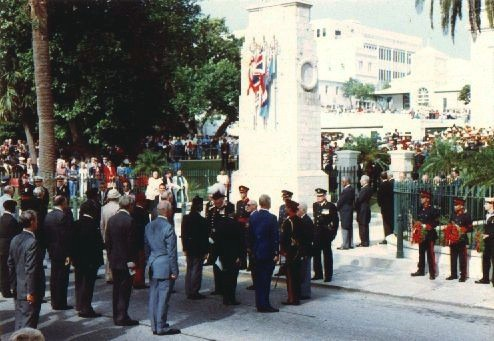
Remembrance Day parade, at the Cenotaph in the City of Hamilton in the British Overseas Territory of Bermuda

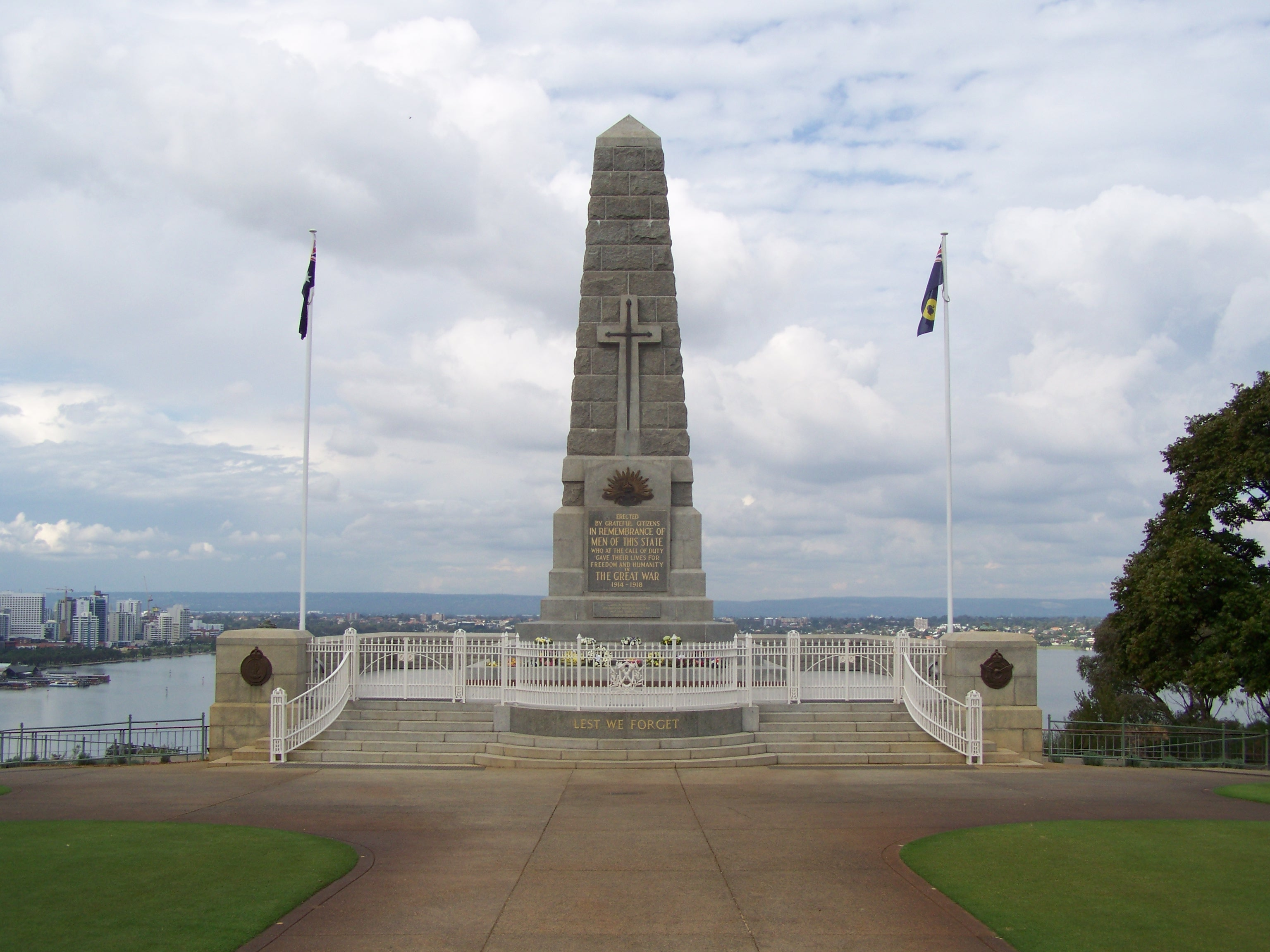
State War Memorial, Kings Park, Perth, Australia

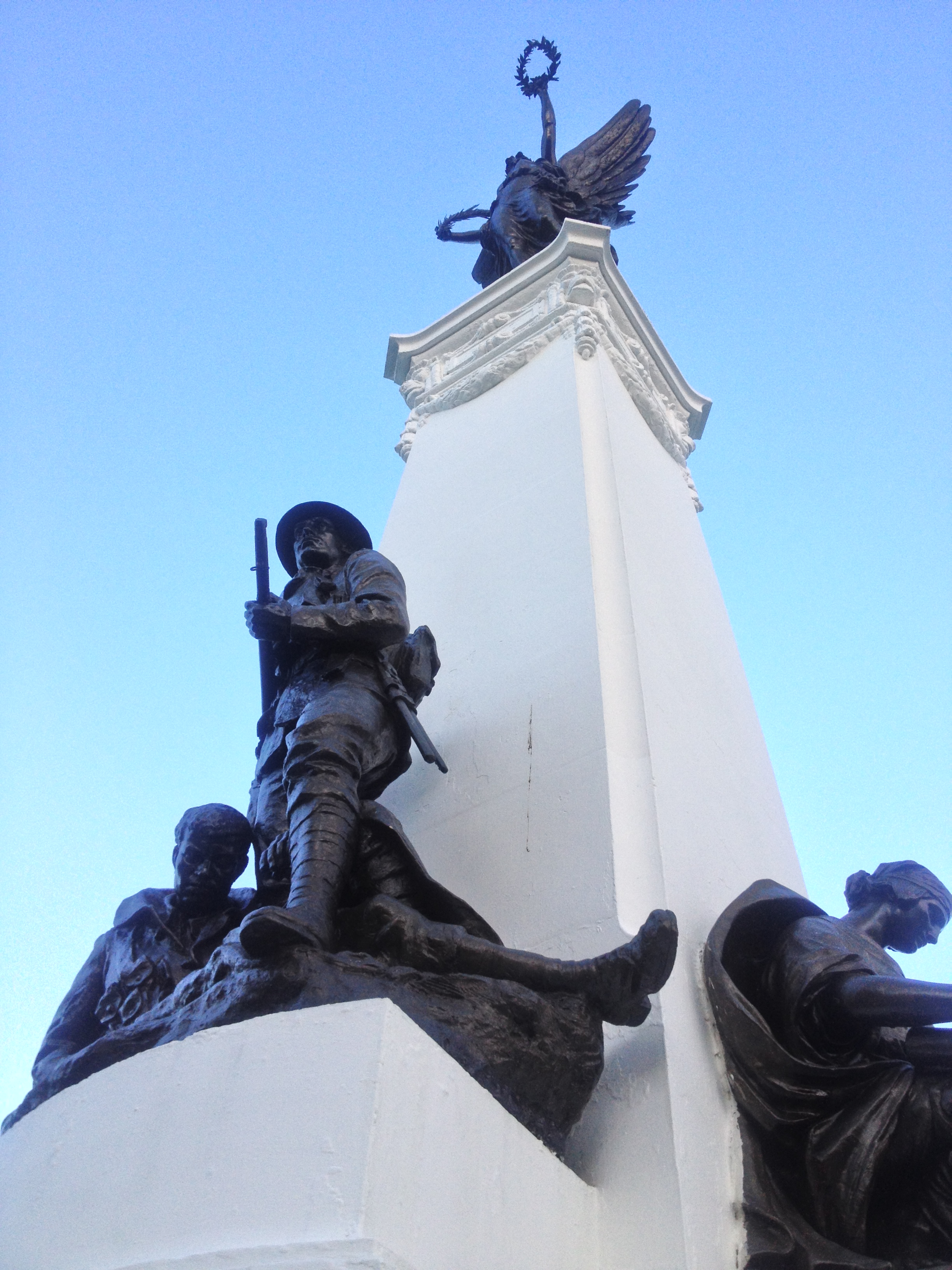
Cenotaph, Port of Spain, Trinidad and Tobago

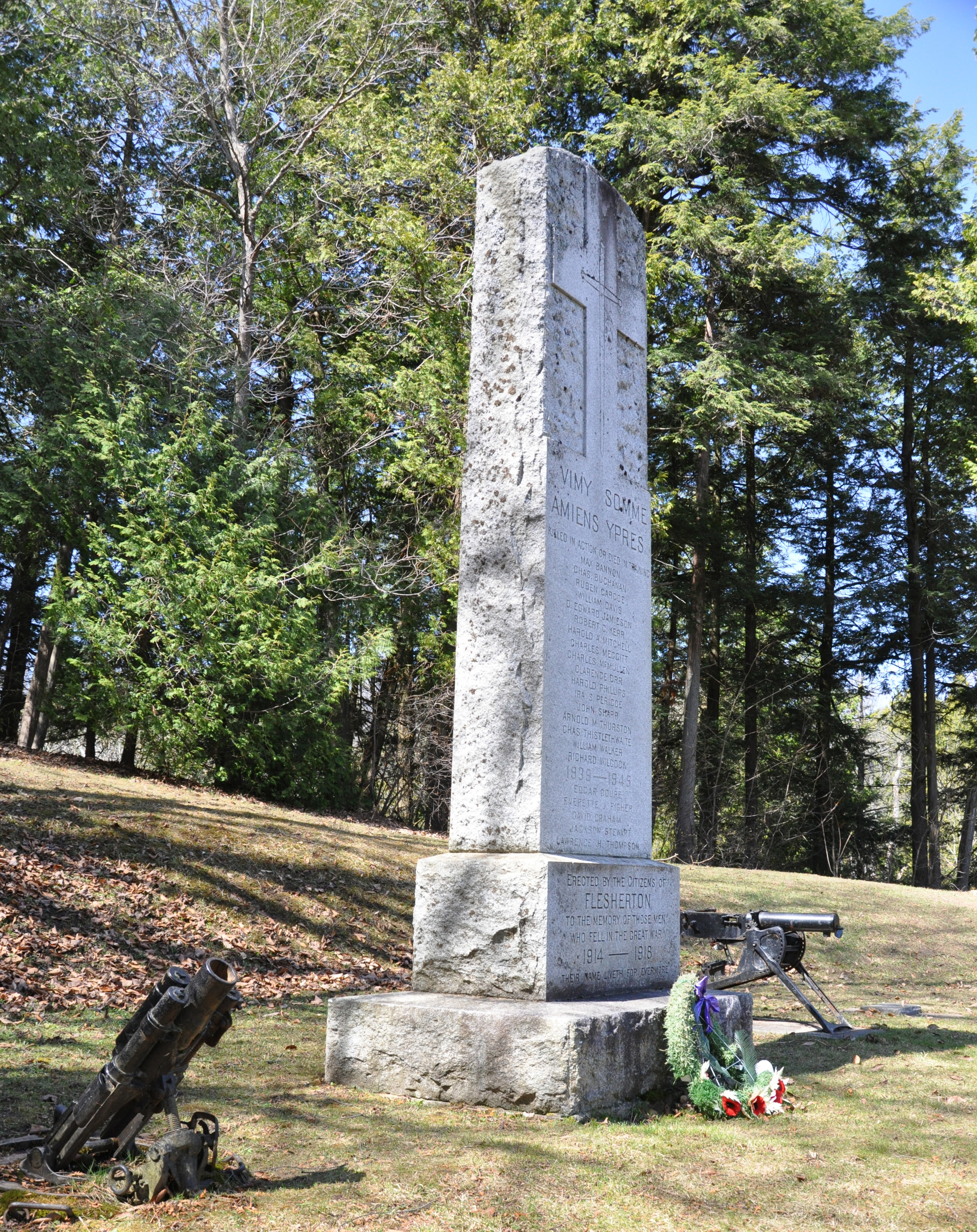
Cenotaph, Flesherton, Ontario, Canada

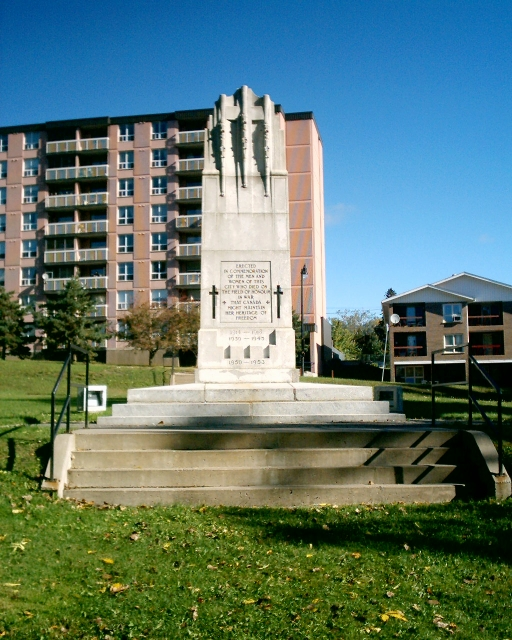
Port Arthur Cenotaph, Waverley Park, Thunder Bay, Ontario

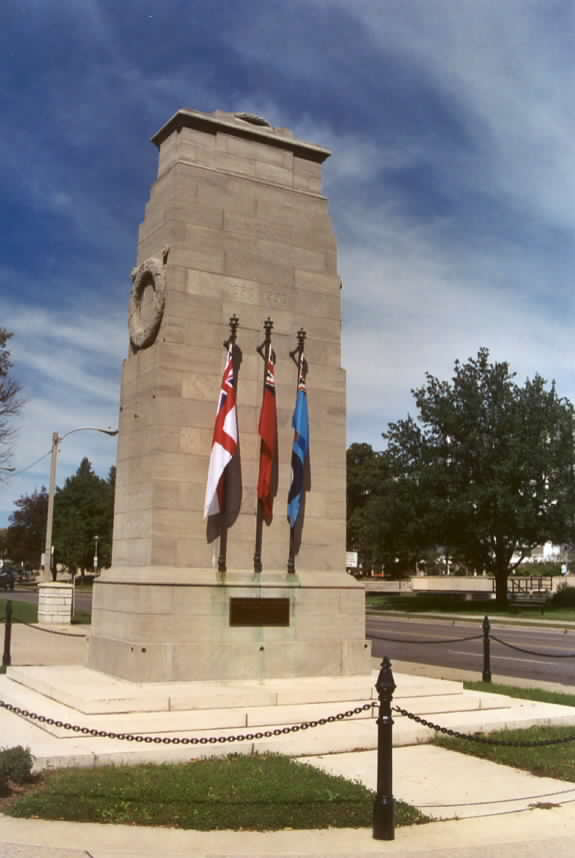
Cenotaph, Victoria Park, London, Ontario

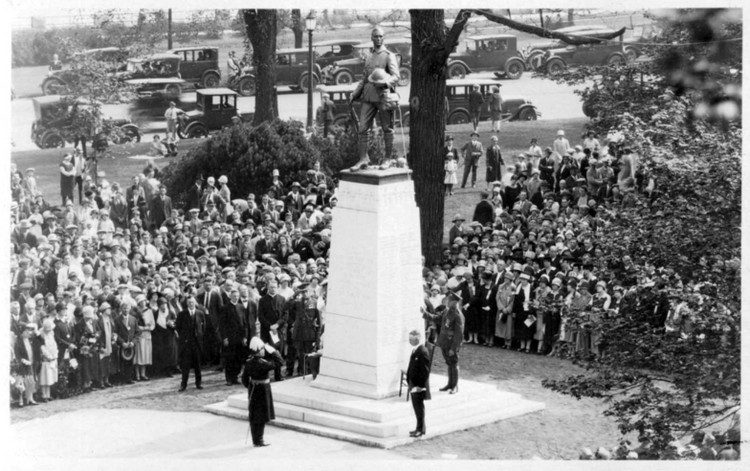
Great War Memorial, Niagara Falls, Ontario

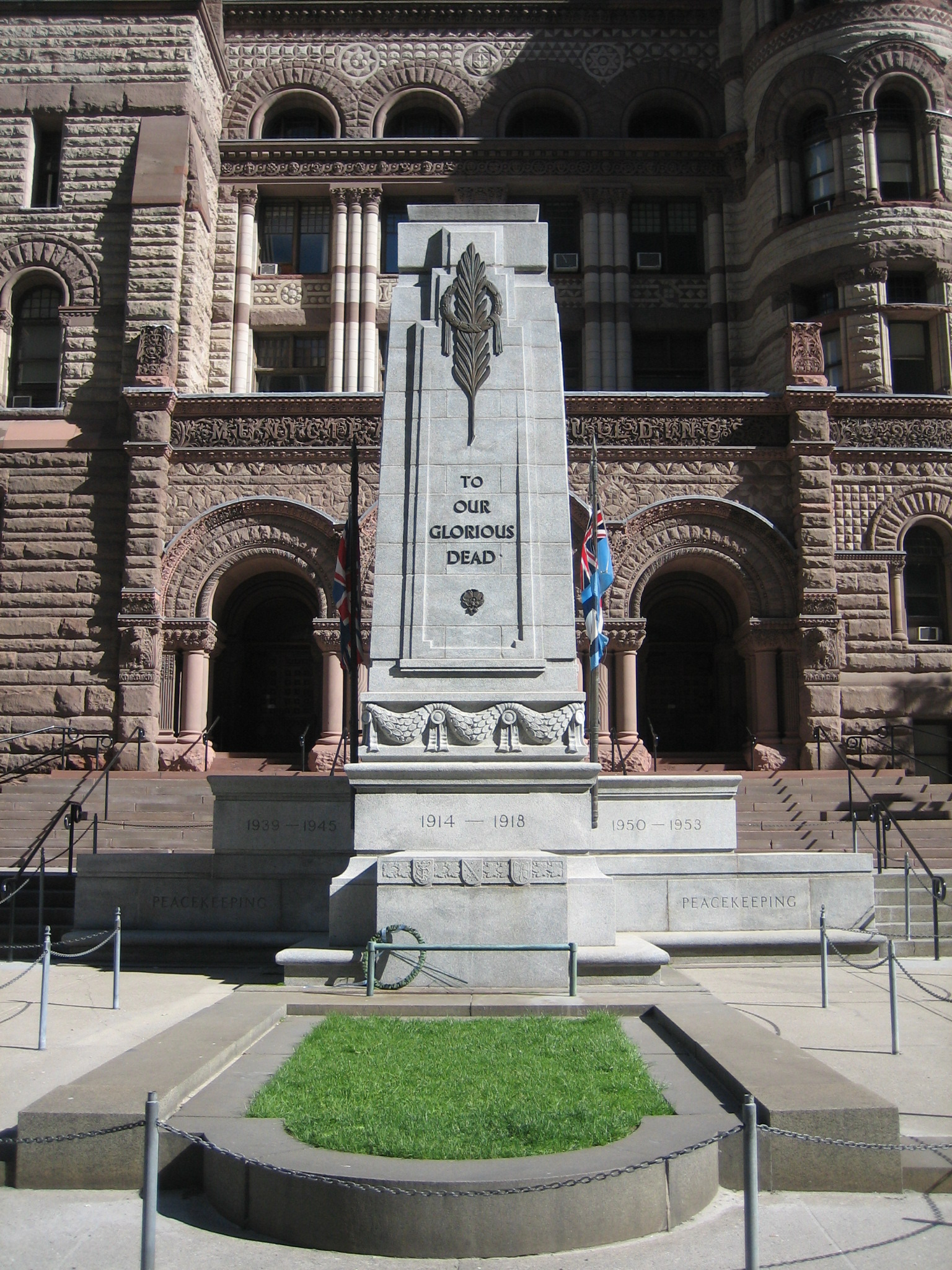
Old City Hall Cenotaph, Toronto, Ontario

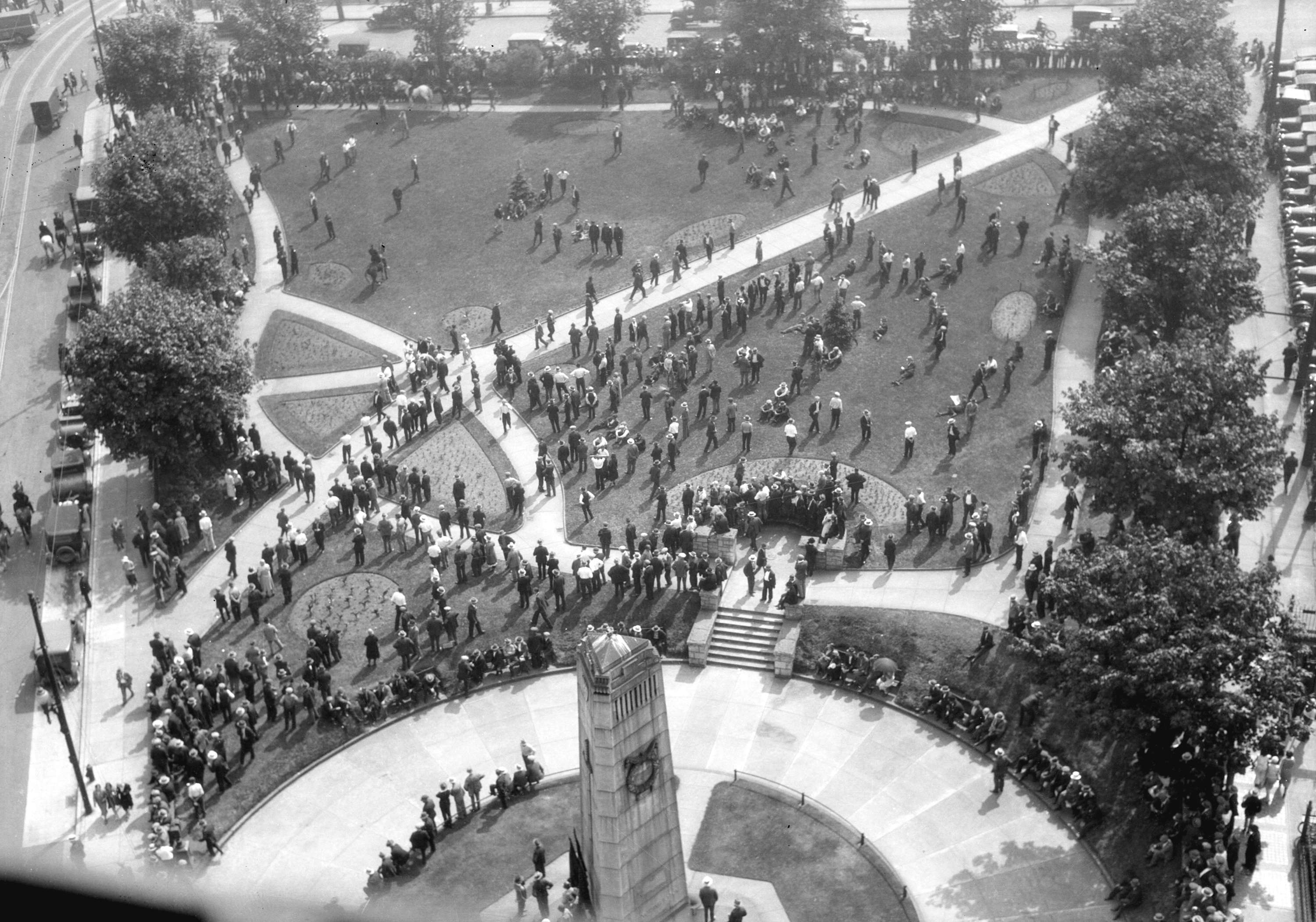
Cenotaph (Victoria), Victory Square, Vancouver, British Columbia

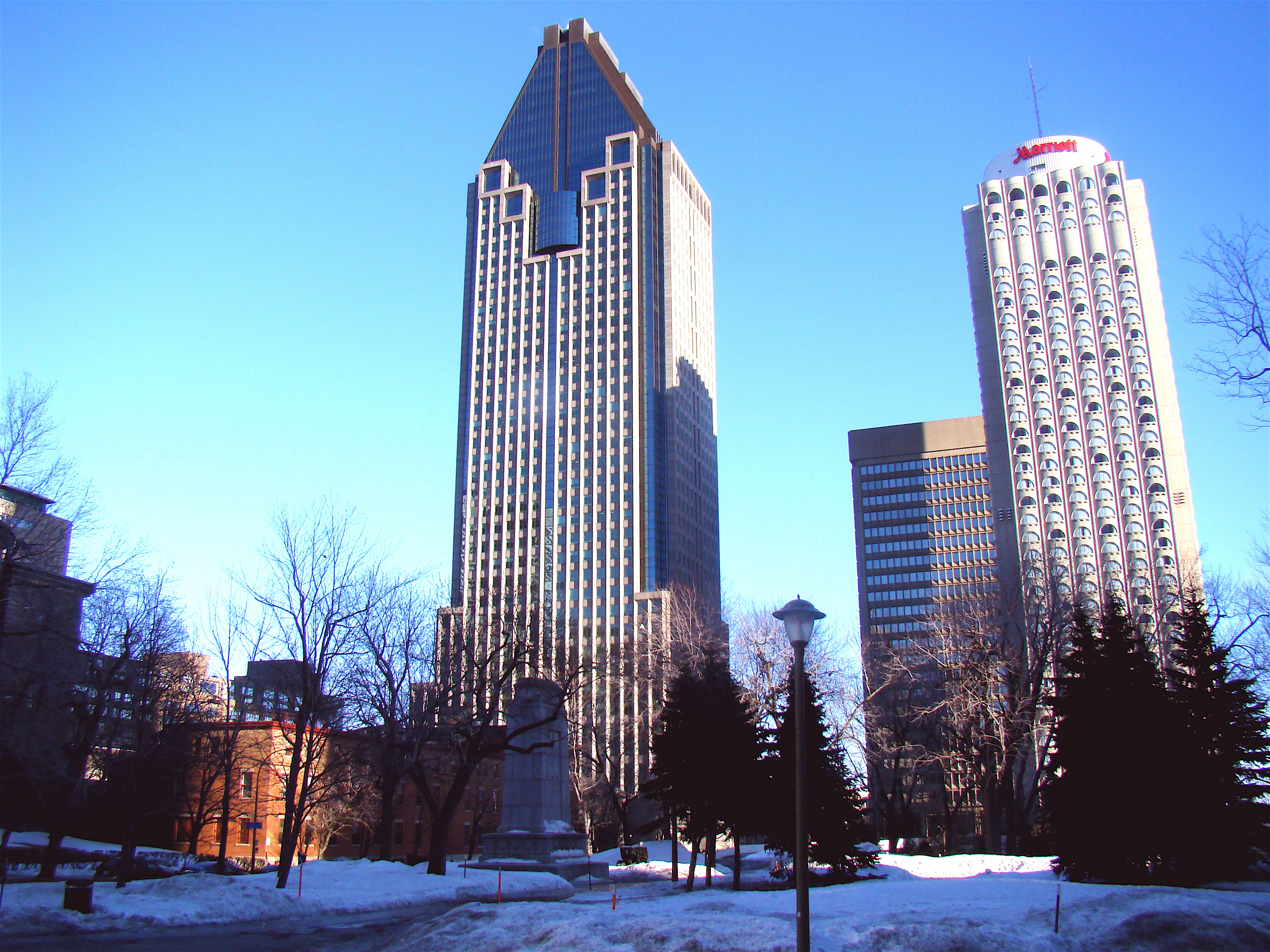
Cenotaph, Place du Canada, Montreal, Quebec

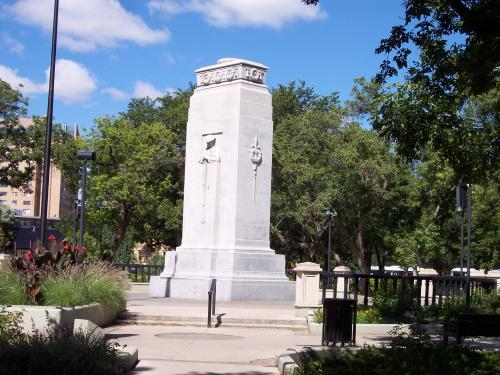
Cenotaph, Victoria Park, Regina, Saskatchewan

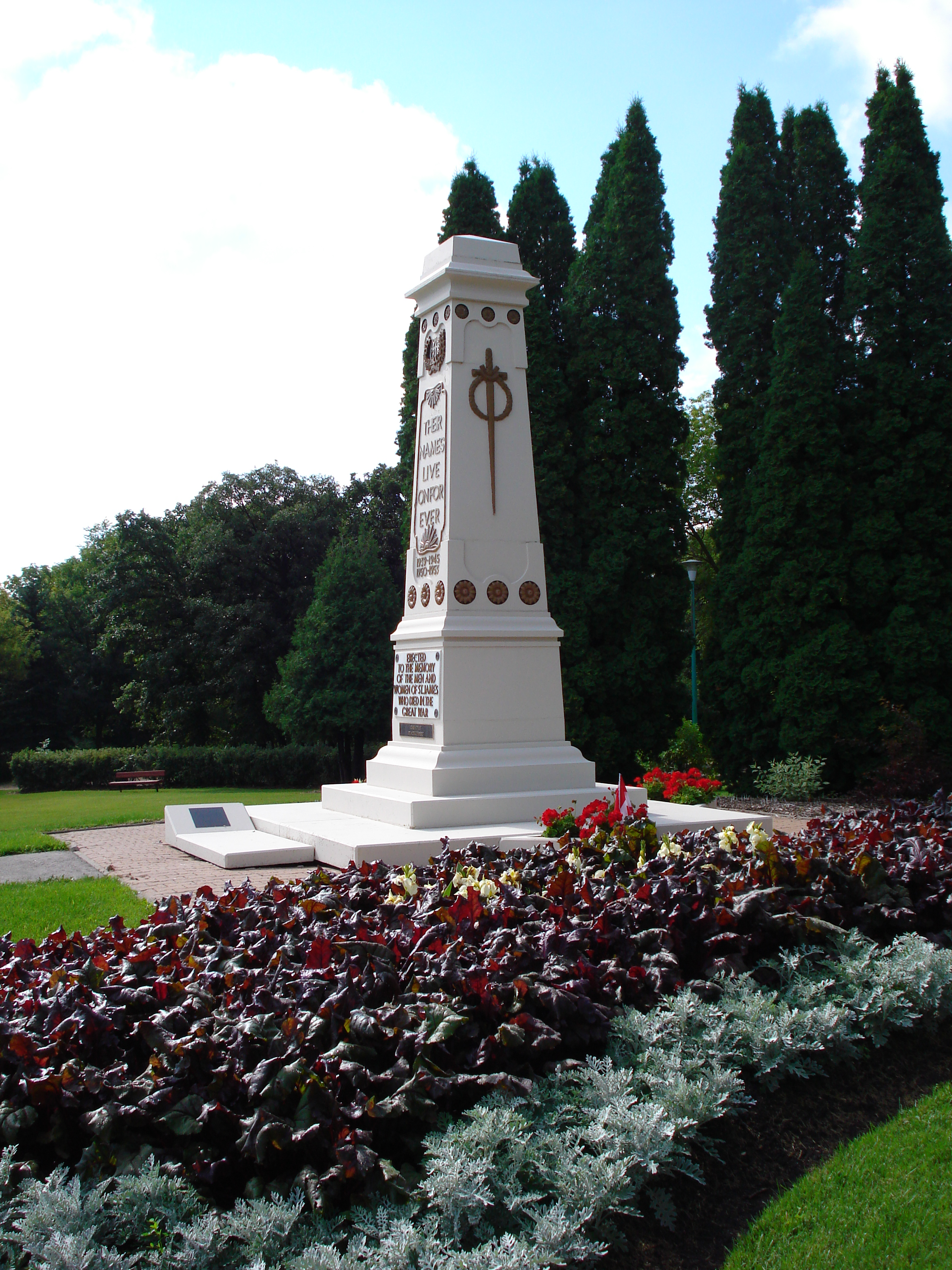
Bruce Park Cenotaph, Winnipeg, Manitoba

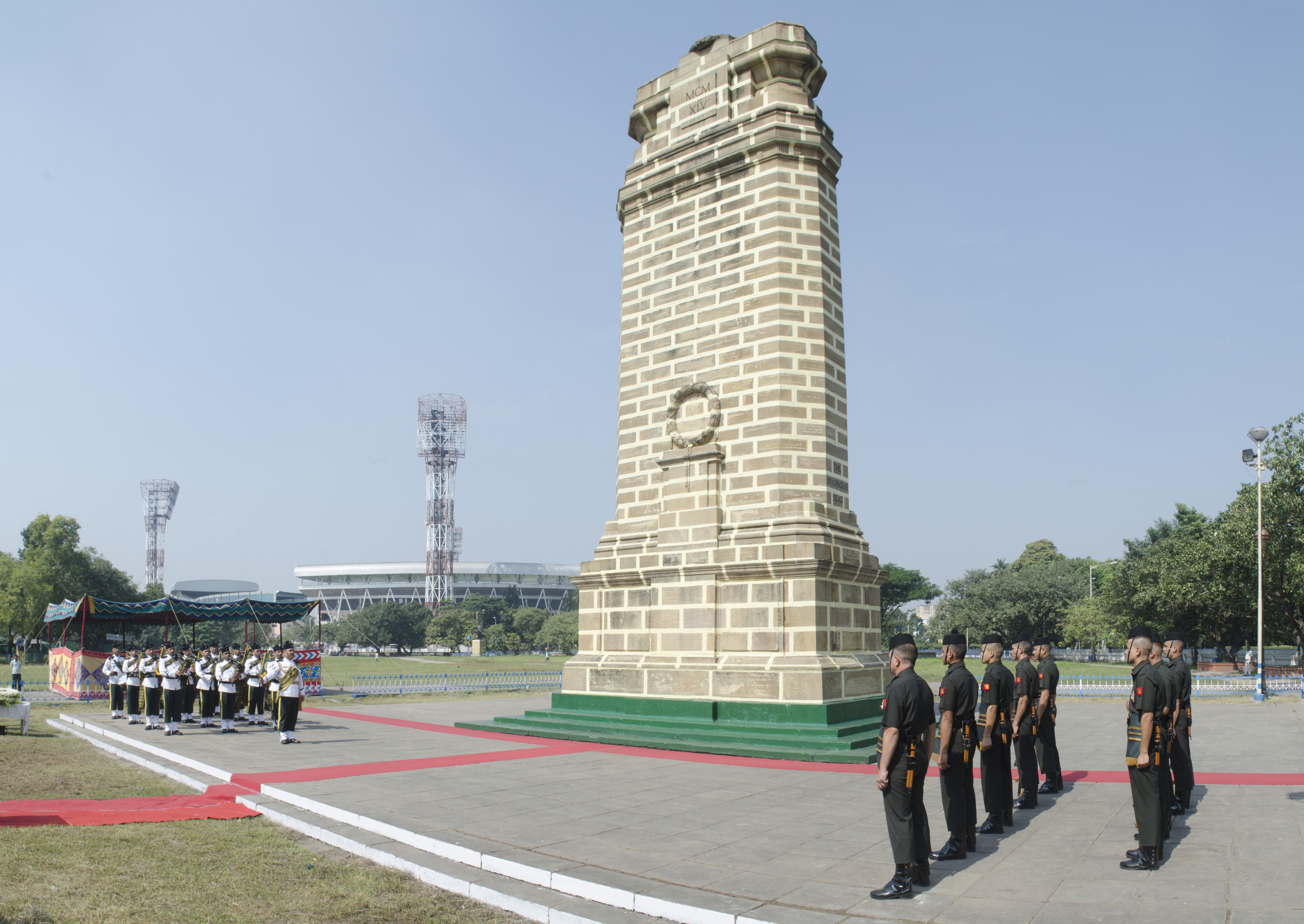
Glorious Dead Cenotaph, Kolkata, India

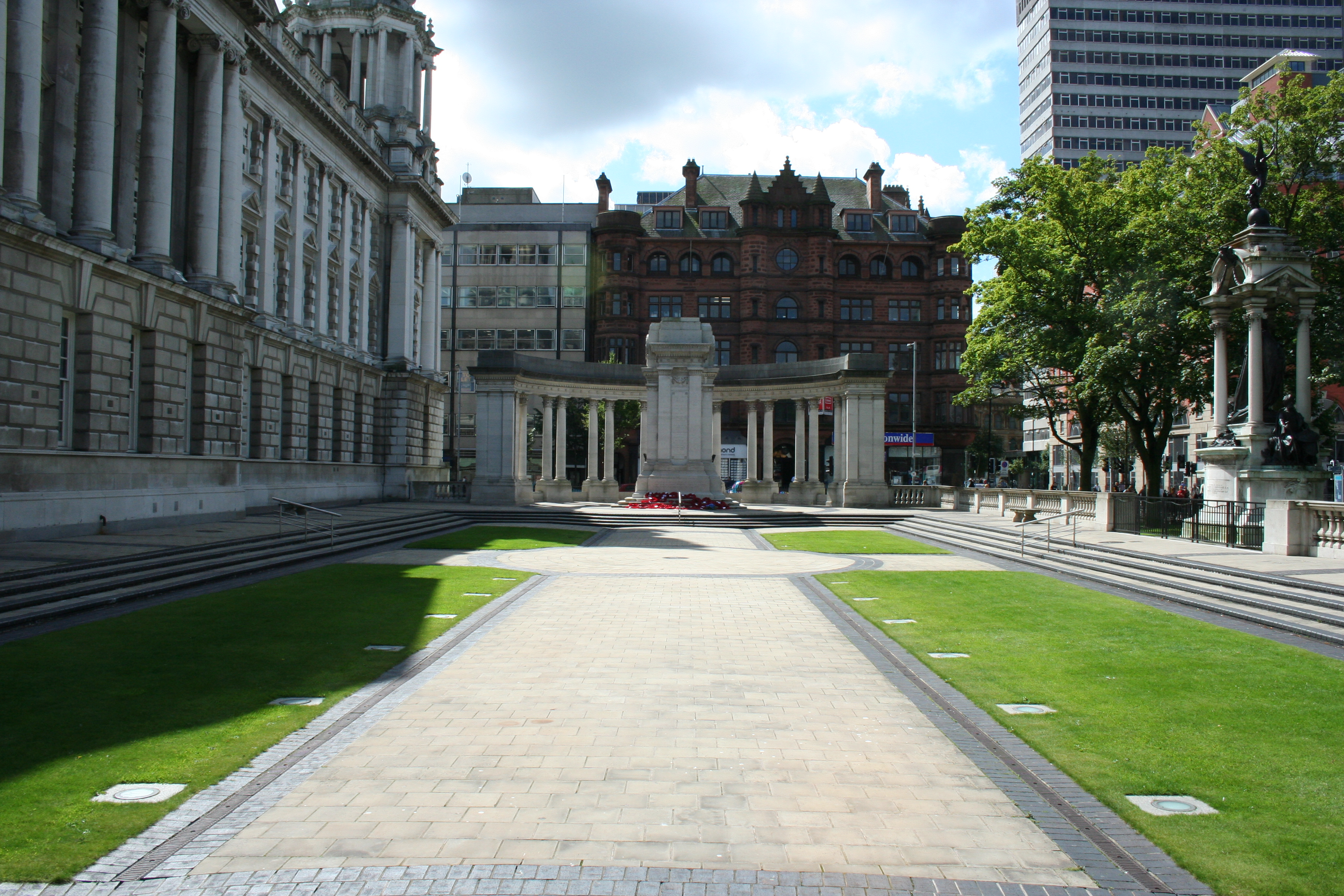
The Cenotaph located in Donegall Square in Belfast

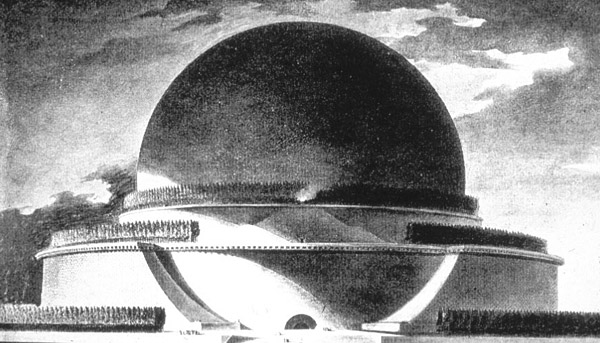
Étienne-Louis Boullée, fantasy sketch Cénotaphe a Newton (1784)

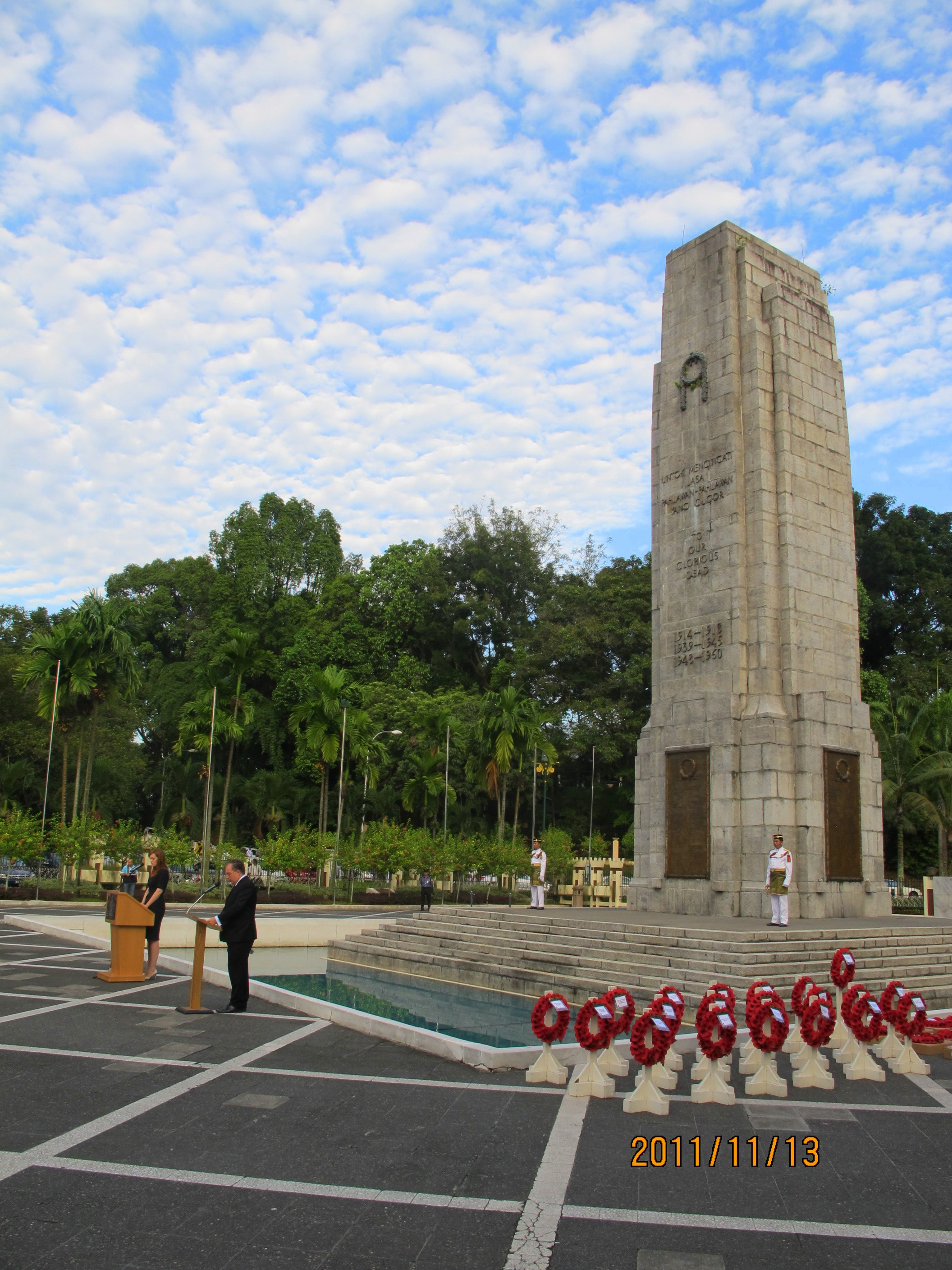
Kuala Lumpur cenotaph, National Monument, Kuala Lumpur, Malaysia

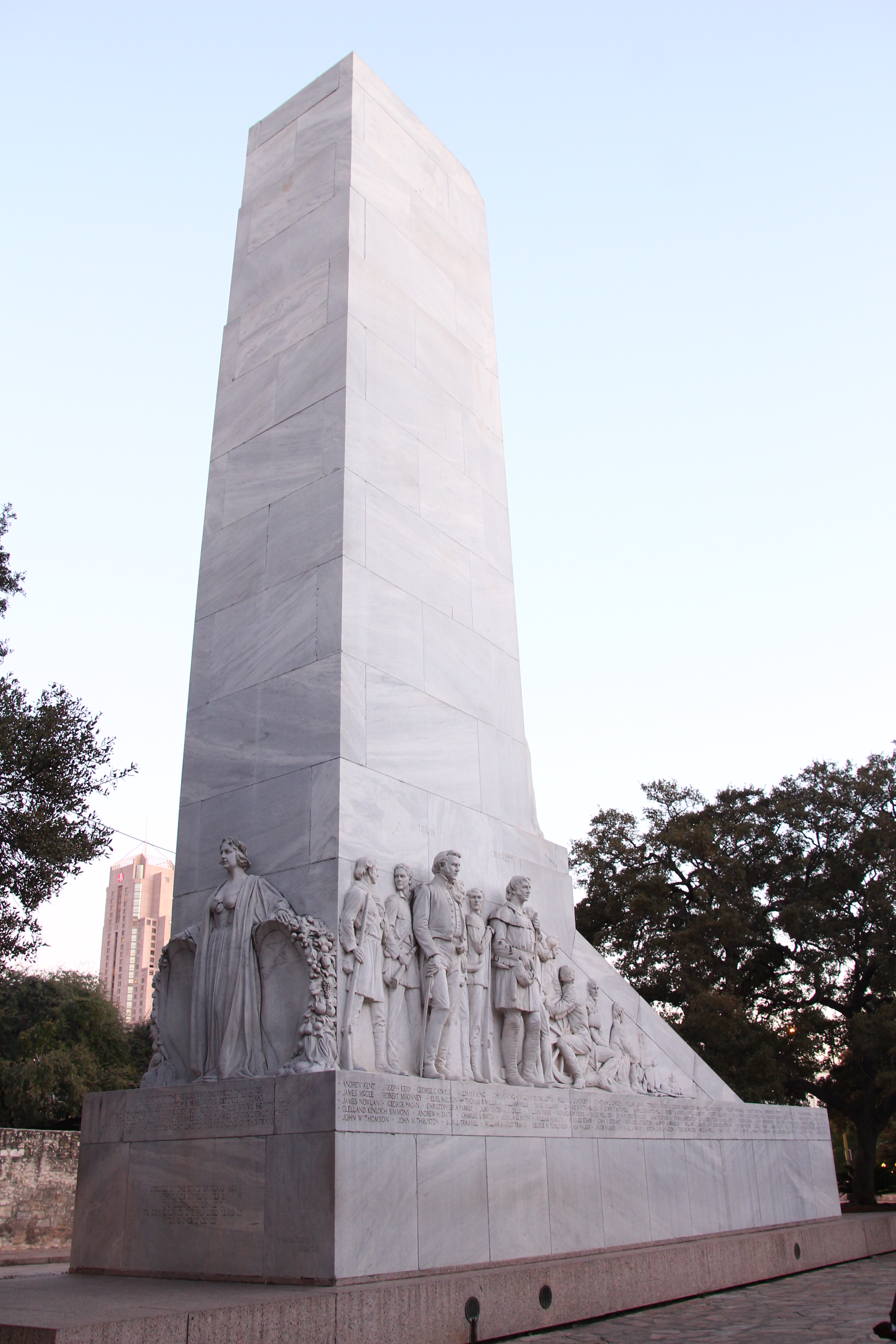
Cenotaph at The Alamo, Spirit of Sacrifice, San Antonio, Texas

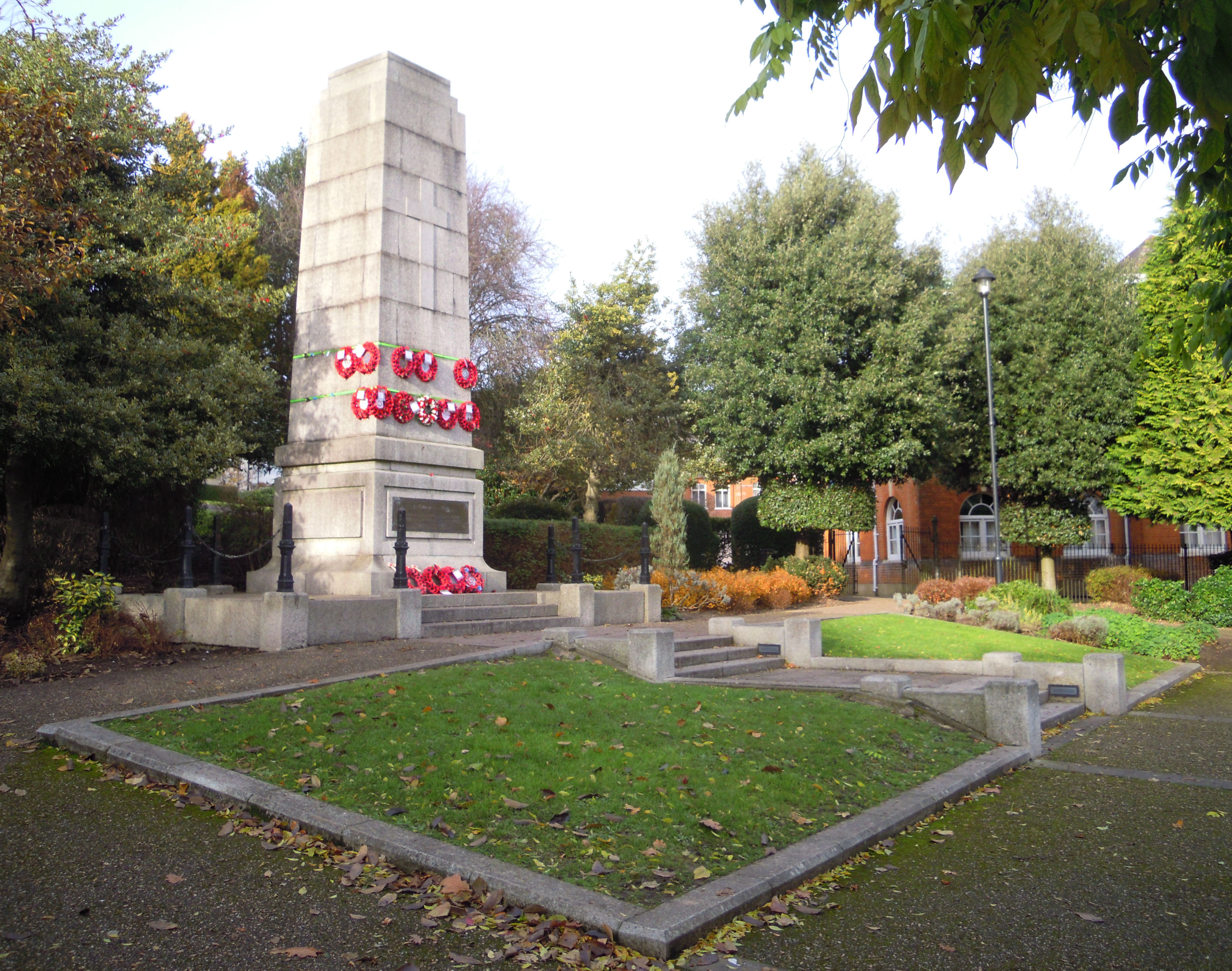
Cenotaph in Aldershot in the UK, 'Home of the British Army'

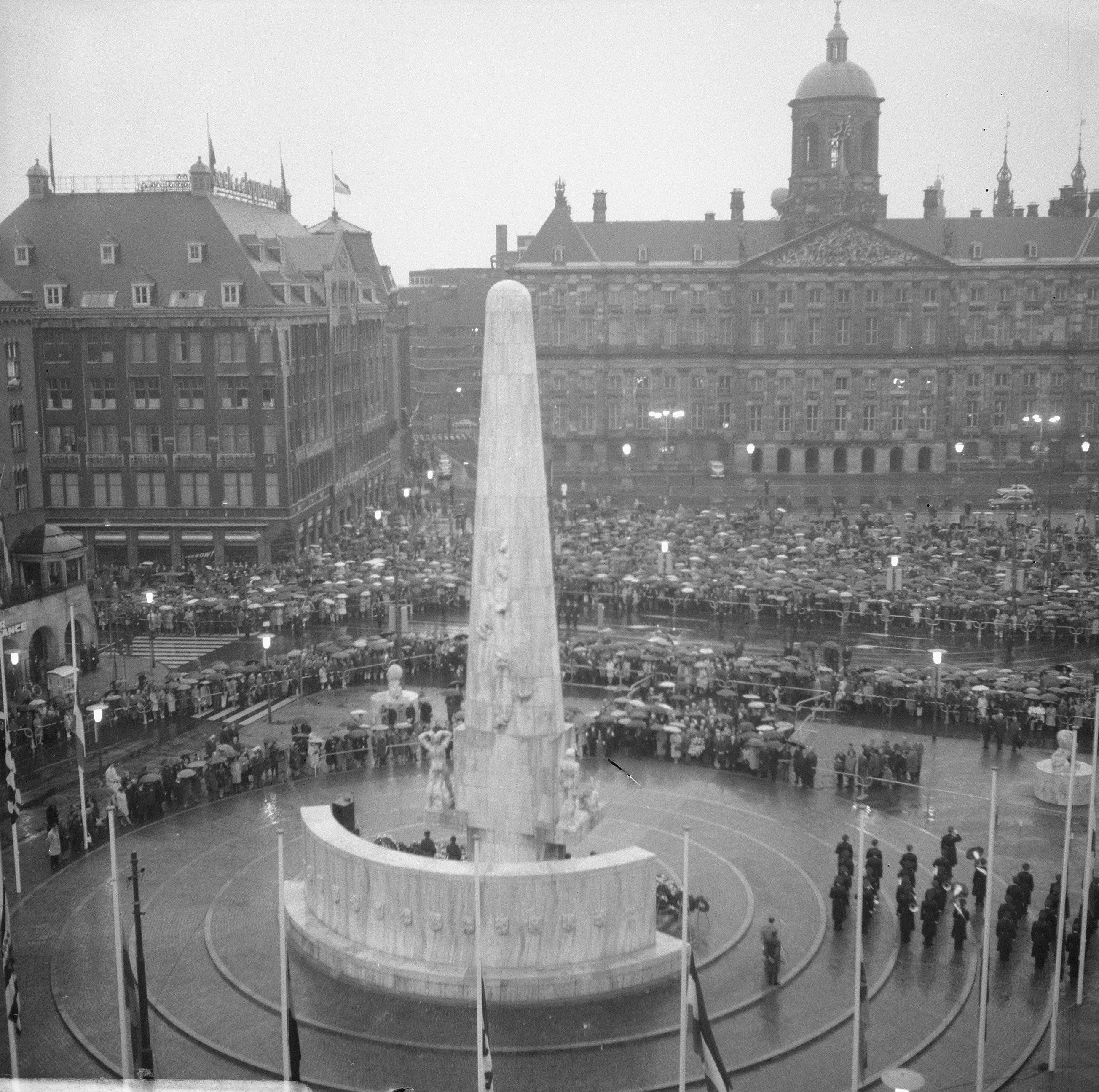
National Monument, Amsterdam, The Netherlands

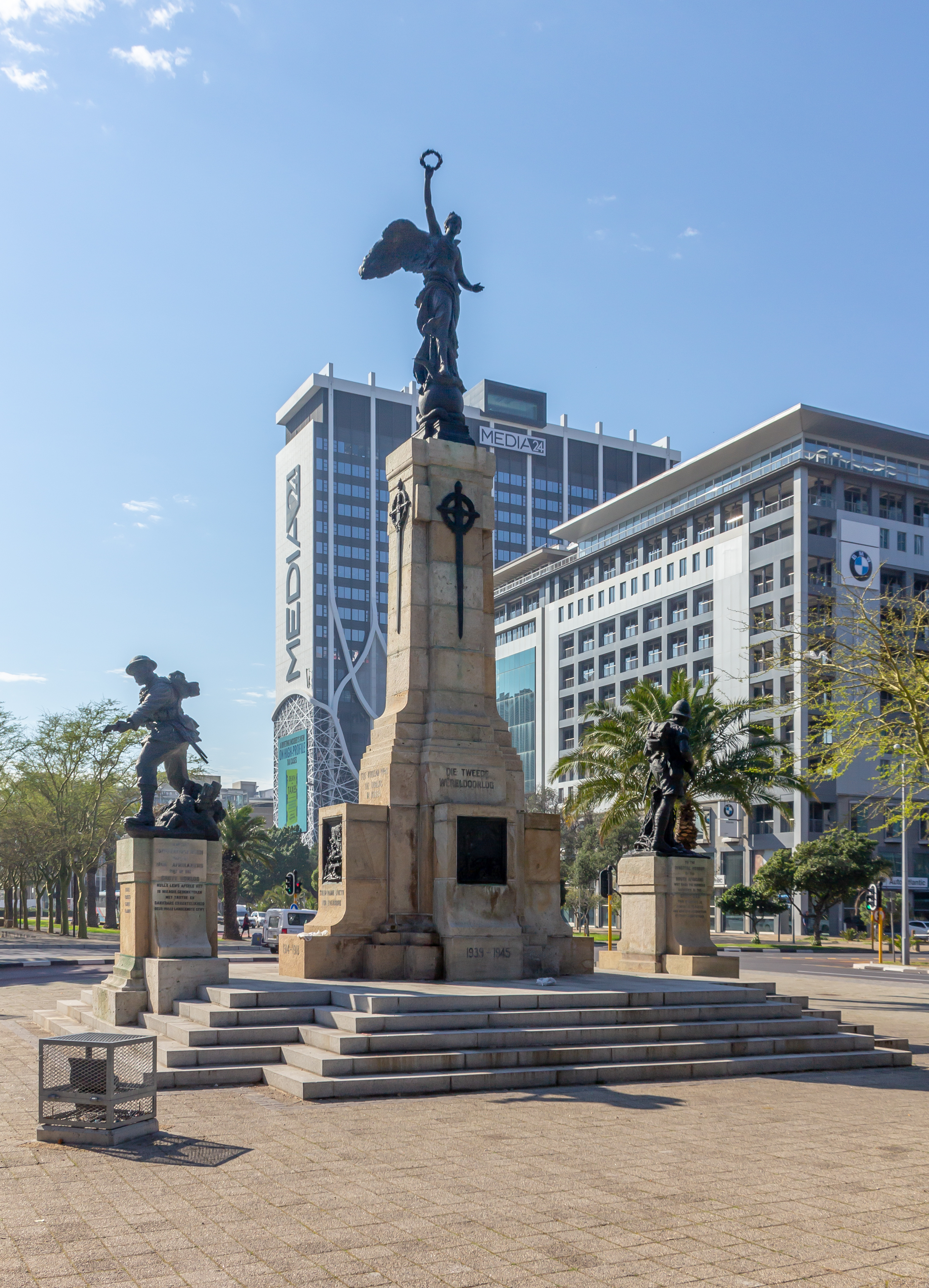
The Cenotaph, Cape Town, South Africa

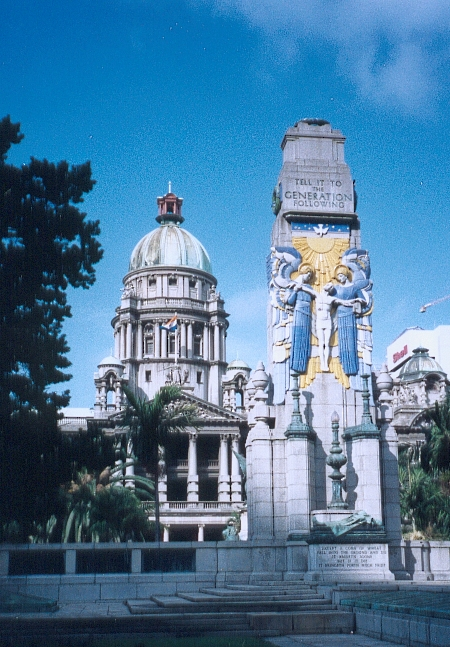
The Cenotaph, Durban, South Africa

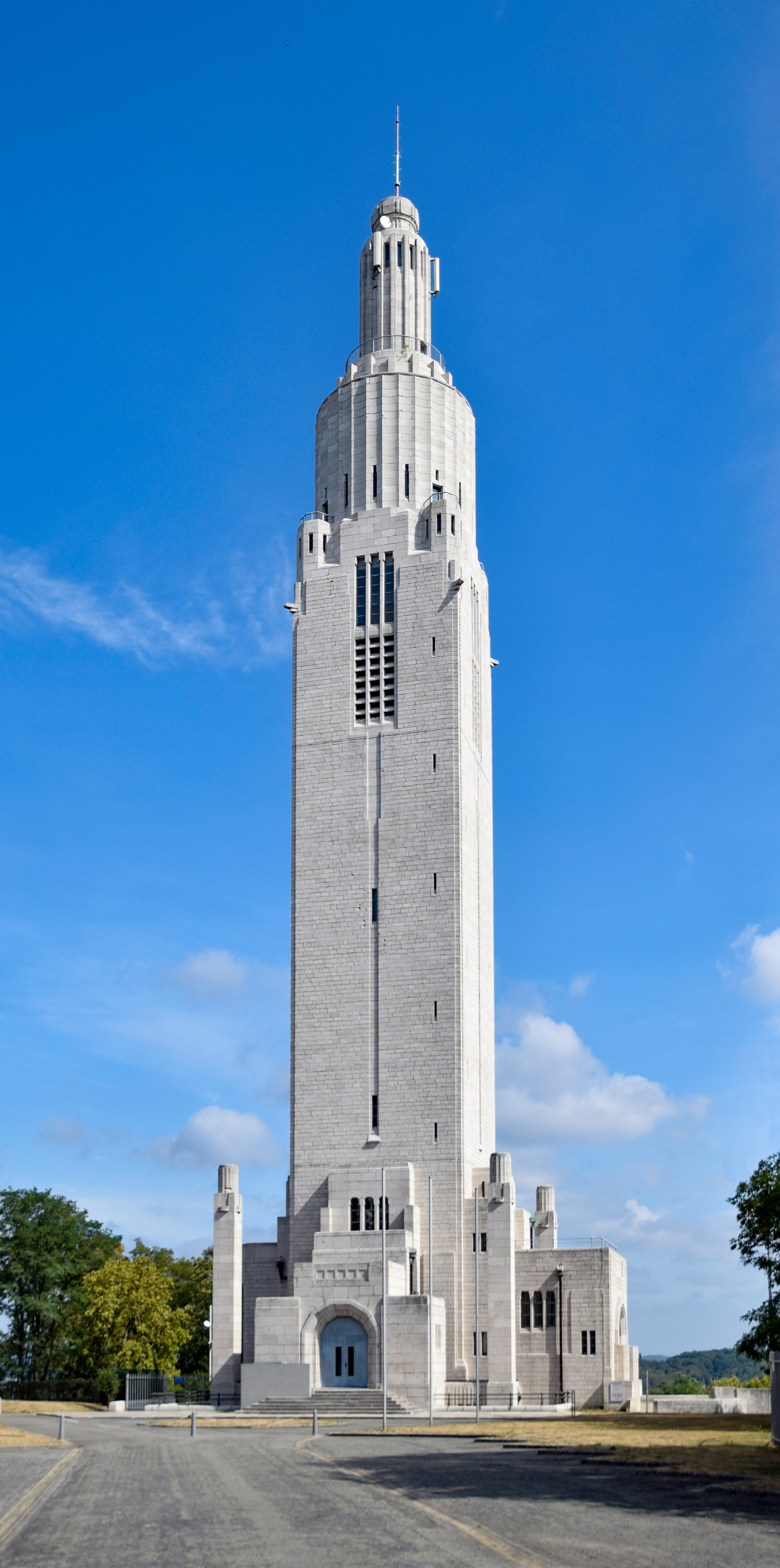
Interallied Memorial of Cointe, Liège, Belgium

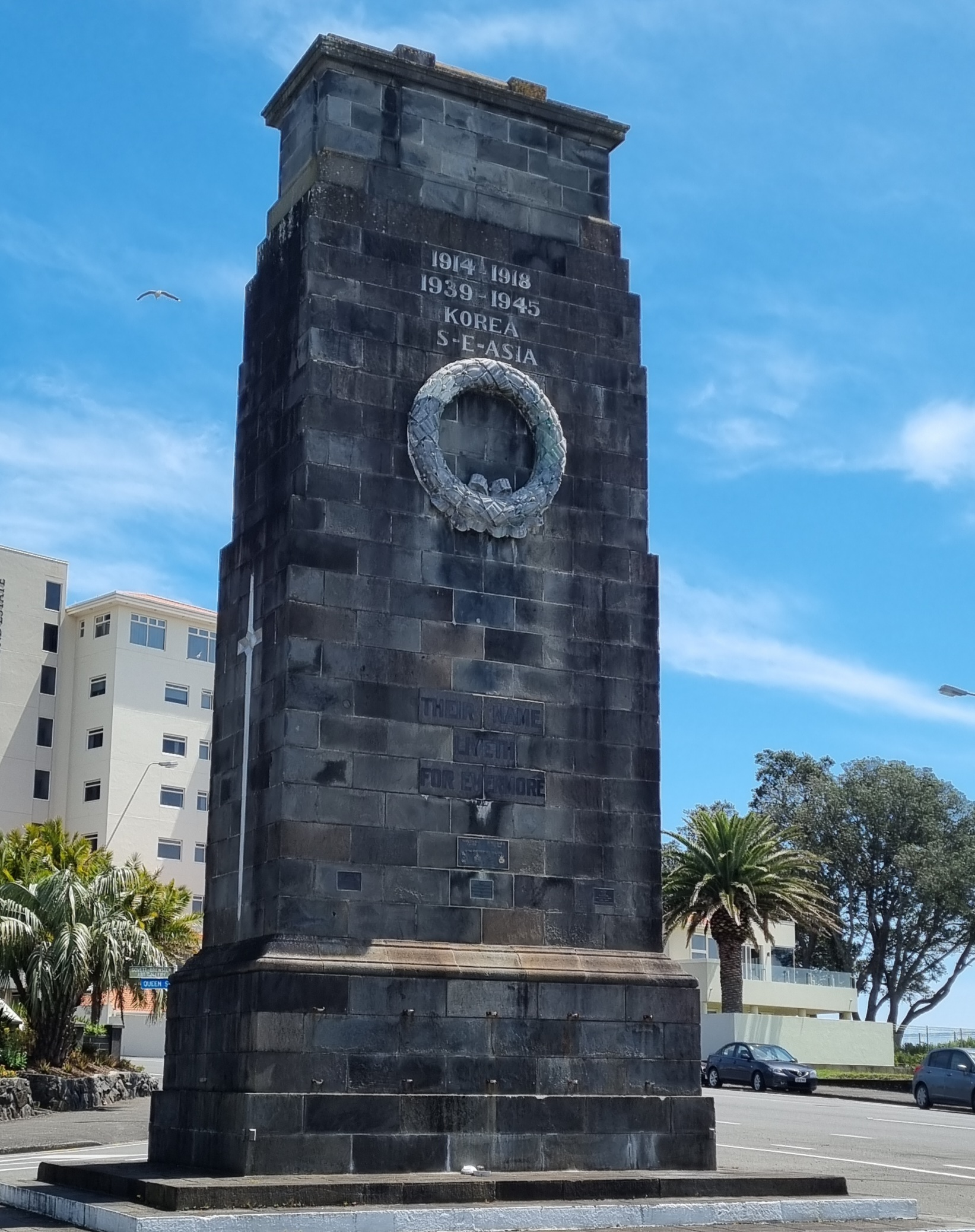
Cenotaph, New Plymouth, New Zealand

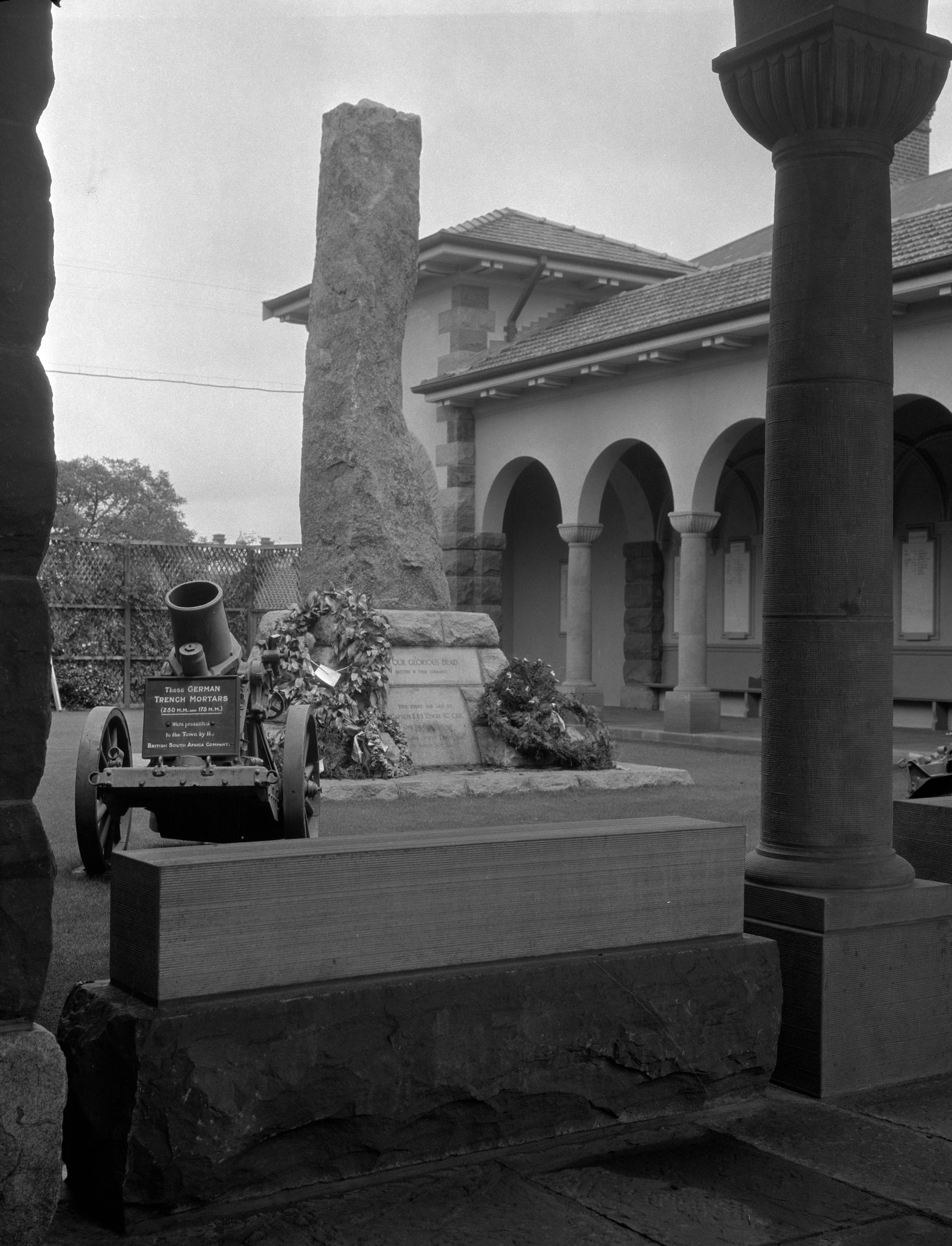
The Cenotaph, Bulawayo, Zimbabwe

== See also ==
- Church of the Holy Sepulchre
- Columbarium
- Cross of Sacrifice
- Epitaph
- Mausoleum
- Memorialization
- Munstead Wood
- Shrine of Remembrance in Melbourne, Victoria, Australia
- Stone of Remembrance
- Tomb of the Unknown Soldier
- Tropaeum Traiani
- War memorial
- Donkin Heritage Trail
