= Seremban War Memorial =

War memorial in Seremban, Malaysia

Coordinates: 2°43′33″N 101°56′36″E

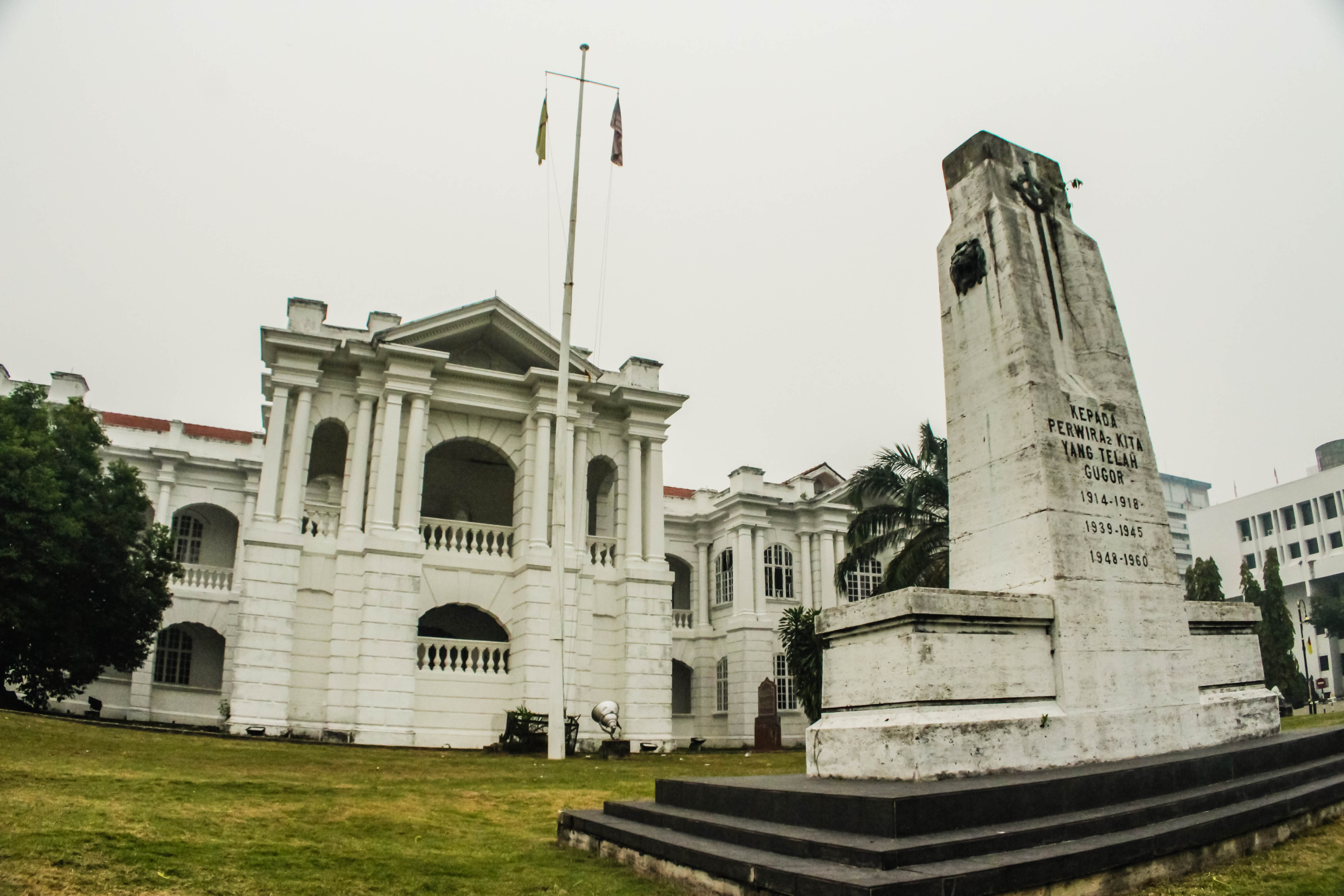
- The memorial situated in front of what was the Seremban State Secretariat building
- For allied servicemen who died in World War I, World War II, and the Malayan Emergency
- Unveiled: 1929
- Location: Seremban, Malaysia

The Seremban War Memorial is a cenotaph situated at Jalan Dato Hamzah, Seremban, Negeri Sembilan, Malaysia.

== Background ==
The memorial was originally built to commemorate the allied servicemen who lost their lives in the First World War. The site chosen was in front of the State Secretariat Building known as the Government Offices, later the State Library. It was erected at the instigation of the Seremban Branch of the Ex-Services Association of Malaya, and unveiled, at a ceremony which took place on Armistice Day, 11 November 1929, by the British Resident, James Simmons.

The design, in the form of a cenotaph, is modelled on the Whitehall Cenotaph, London, and bears an inscription which states that the memorial commemorates those servicemen who died in the First World War, as well as the Second World War, and the Malayan Emergency.
