= North Borneo War Monument =

- Tugu Peringatan Perang Borneo Utara
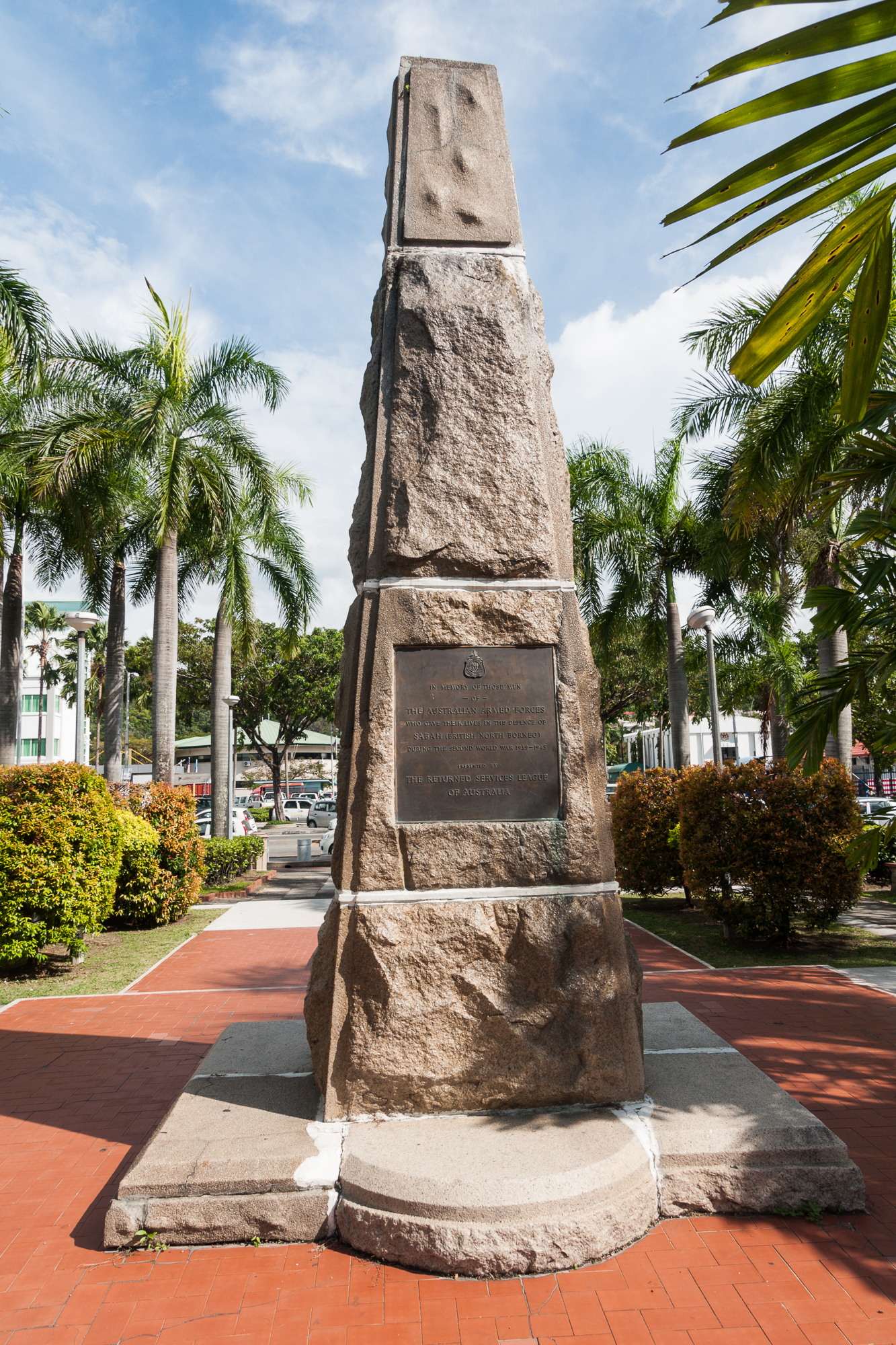
- Interactive map of North Borneo War Monument
- Location: Kota Kinabalu
- Coordinates: 5°58′54″N 116°04′29″E
- Type: Obelisk
- Material: Stone
- Opening date: 8 May 1923; 103 years ago
- Dedicated to: Those fallen British soldiers during World War I and Australian soldiers during World War II

The North Borneo War Monument (Malay: Tugu Peringatan Perang Borneo Utara) is a monument that was erected on 8 May 1923 by the North Borneo Chartered Company in Bond Street, Jesselton, British North Borneo. Originally, it was a memorial for the fallen British soldiers in World War I but later extended to include the Australian soldiers in World War II. The monument stands today in the city park of Kota Kinabalu, the capital of the Malaysian state of Sabah.

== History ==
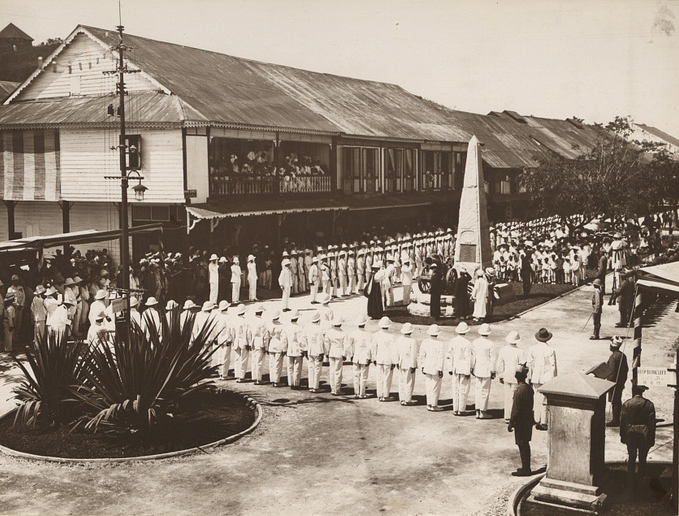
Inauguration of the monument on 8 May 1923

The monument was erected on 8 May 1923, making it the oldest current monument in Sabah. It was intended to commemorate the deaths of 51 British soldiers. Following the Second World War, it was expanded to also commemorate 61 Australian soldiers. Following the Indonesia–Malaysia confrontation, the deaths of 61 Malaysian soldiers were also commemorated.

The monument was originally erected in Bond Street (now Gaya Street), and was later moved to Jalan Pantai (formerly Neil Malcolm Street). Due to the shifting of the KK City Park in the 1970s, the monument had undergone changes in form and height. In addition, the bronze plaque on the obelisk and a plaque at the site of previous gun were extended.

=== Original shape ===
The monument originally consisted of an approximately 2.5-metre-high (8.2 ft) obelisk of granite and a cannon that were placed each on their own narrow rectangular base with semicircular ends. Both bases were mounted on a second common base.

=== Today's form ===
The shape of the obelisk was not changed, but the original unit of the base plate is no longer given. The cannon base was placed about 3 metres from the obelisk, but without a gun. There is now a plaque instead of the gun.

=== Original inscription ===
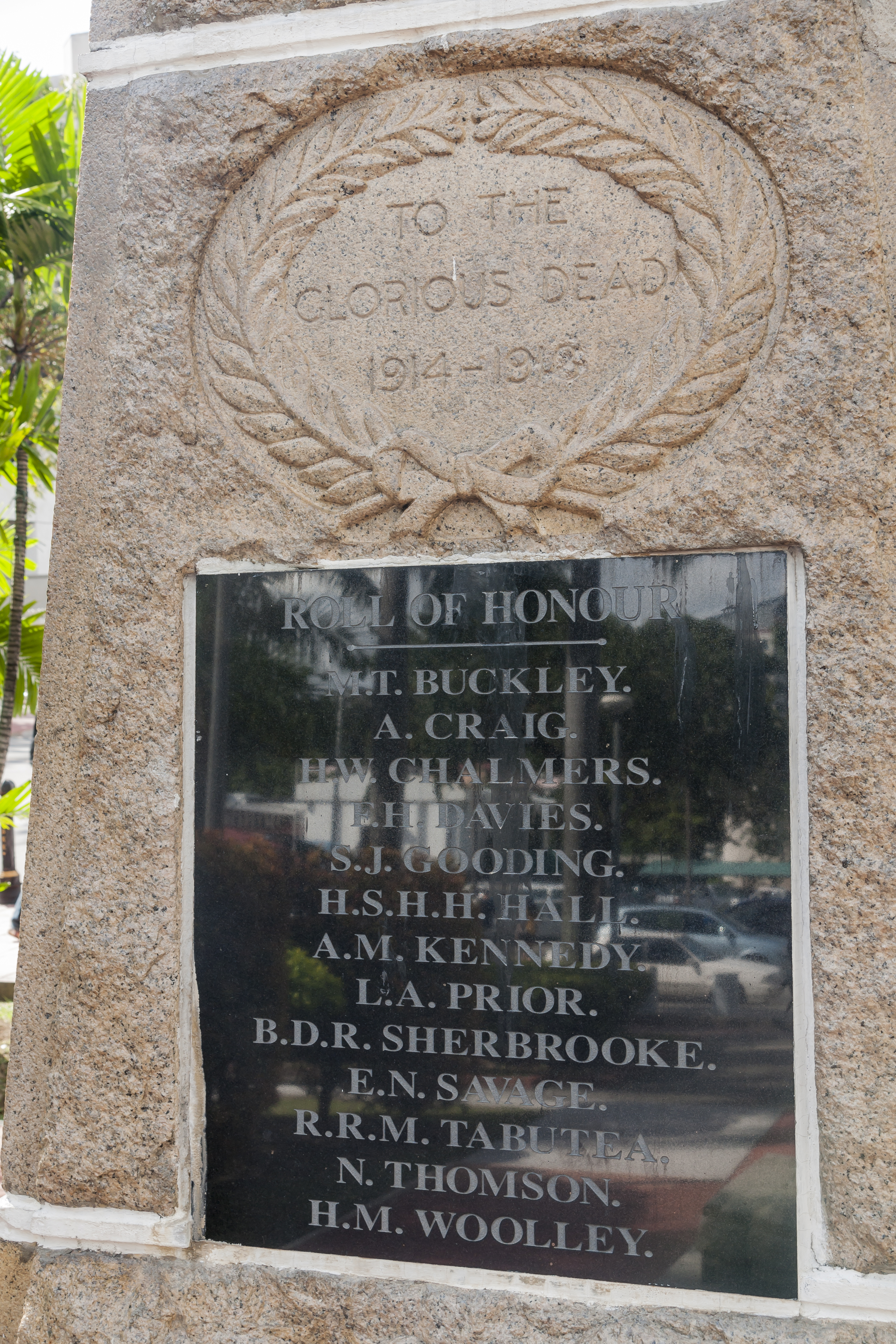
Marble plaque with the names of the 13 fallen British soldiers in World War I

The original decoration included a carved in the stone relief in the form of a laurel wreath with the inscription, To The Glorious Dead 1914–1918 (Note: Translation: The Glorious Dead 1914–1918.) and a marble slab in the second pyramid stone. The marble plaque lists the names of 13 fallen of the First World War to:

ROLL OF HONOUR
M.T. Buckley
A. Craigh
H.W. Chalmers
F.H. Davies
S.J. Gooding
H.S.H.H. Hall
A.M. Kennedy
L.A.Prior
B.D.R. Sherbrooke
E.N. Savage
R.R.M. Tabutea
N. Thomson
H.M. Woolley

=== Extensions ===
On the opposite side of the marble slab (west) was a bronze plaque mounted with the following inscription:

In Memory Of Those Men
– of –
THE AUSTRALIAN ARMED FORCES
Who Gave Their Lives In the Defence Of
SABAH (BRITISH NORTH BORNEO)
During The Second World War 1939–1945

Presented By
The Returned Services League
Of Australia

The identical text is in gold lettering on a black plate on the earlier cannon base.

On the north side of the obelisk is a memorial plaque to the victims during the time which was Confrontation attached.

== Inauguration ==
As of 8 May 1923 by 10 o'clock in the morning, the ceremony of the inauguration of the monument was held by Major-general Sir Neill Malcolm. The presence of HMS Hawkins and a guard of honour, consisting the members of the Royal Navy, veterans of the First World War and the British North Borneo Constabulary gave the event a military context. Among the guests were the Governor Sir William Rycroft, Admiral Arthur Leveson, the Bishop of Labuan and Sarawak and Ms Stotter. Bishop Danson dedicated the obelisk and made a speech of greetings on behalf from the representatives of the Catholics, Muslims and Sikhs, along with the speech from Sir Neill Malcolm.

== In popular culture ==
As a remembering to the former site of the monument on Bond Street, an exhibition was held in 2012 with the theme "Bonding with Gaya Street (BGS)".

Annual commemorations are held at the monument on Anzac Day to honour the people recognised as having sacrificed themselves for Sabah in any conflict.

Perhaps due to the establishment of the De Fontaine Memorial in 1912, the shape of the North Borneo War Memorial was very similar to it.

== Gallery ==
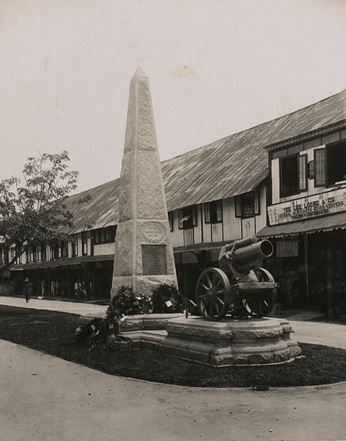
The monument in 1923

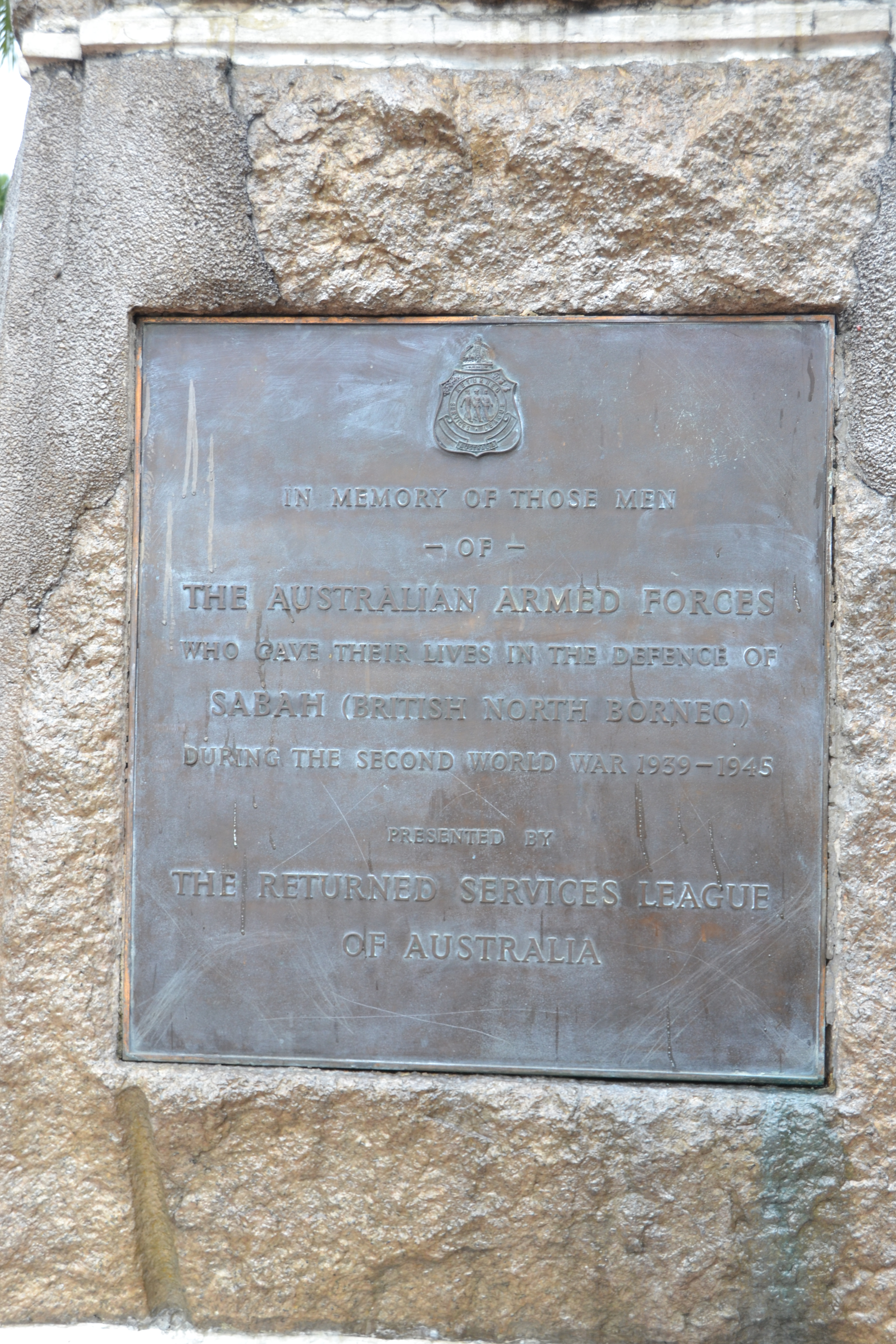
Bronze plaque commemorating the death of Australian soldiers during the Second World War

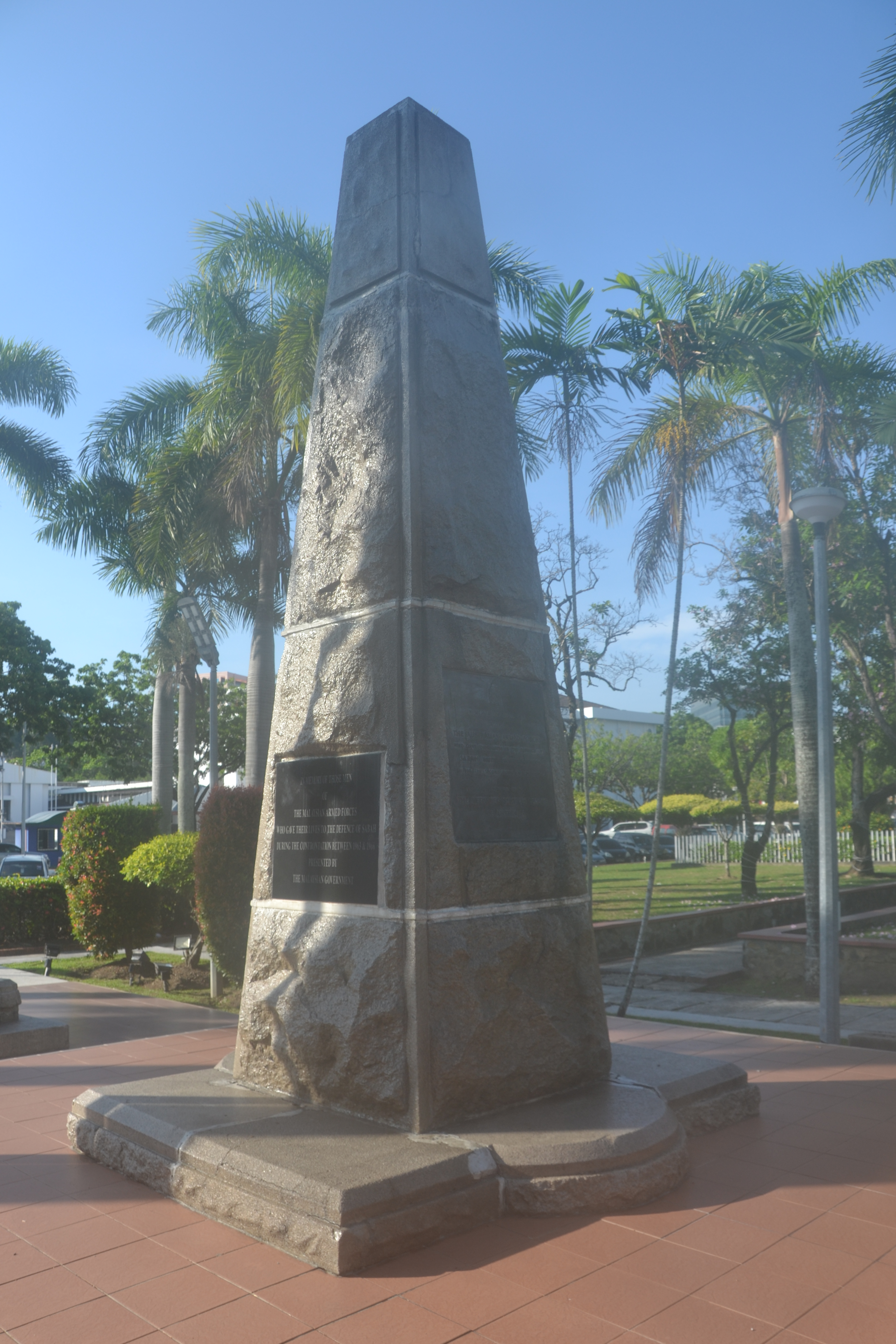
The two added plaques

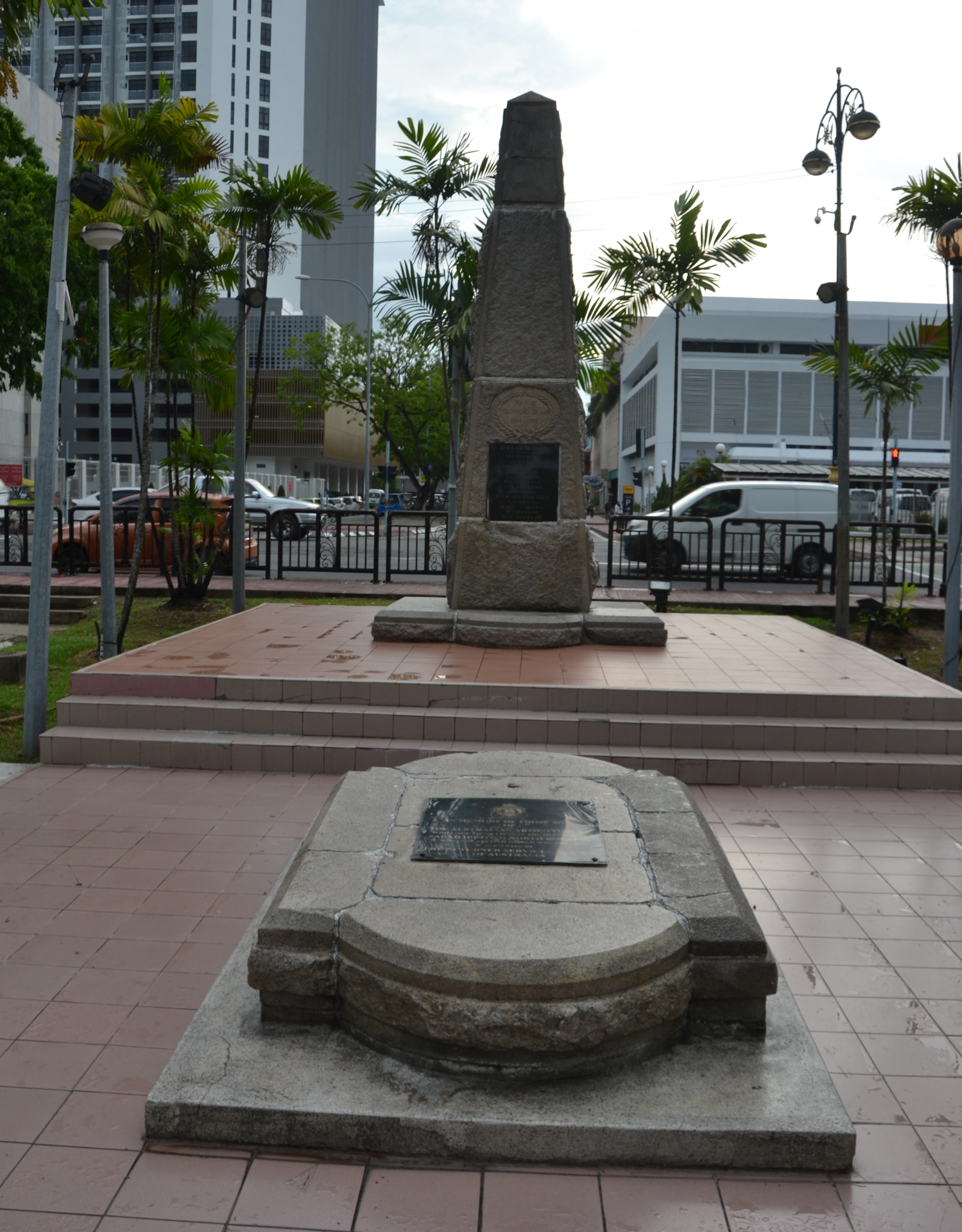
The monument and cannon base following relocation from Gaya Street (formerly Bond Street)
