= List of Cypriot governments =

This article lists the successive Cypriot governments from the independence of Cyprus in 1960 to the present day.

== Governments ==
Dates	Government	President	Governing Parties	Opposition Leader	Key Event(s)
16 Aug 1960 – 25 Feb 1968	First Makarios Government	Archbishop Makarios III (1913–1977)	Patriotic Front	Ezekias Papaioannou	1. London and Zürich Agreements.; 2. Cyprus' admission as a member state of Commonwealth of Nations.; 3. Cypriot intercommunal violence.; 4. Formation of UNFICYP.; 5. Battle of Tillyria .
25 Feb 1968 – 15 Jul 1974	Second Makarios Government	Archbishop Makarios III (1913–1977)	1. Patriotic Front; 2. AKEL	Odysseus Ioannidis	1. EOKA B against Makarios.; 2. 1972–1973 Cypriot ecclesiastical coup attempt.; 3. 1974 Cypriot coup d'état.
15 Jul 1974 – 23 Jul 1974	Samspon caretaker Government	Nikos Samson (1935–2001)	Progressive Front	No opposition	1. First Turkish invasion.
23 Jul 1974 – 7 Dec 1974	Clerides caretaker Government	Glafcos Clerides (1919–2013)	Eniaion	No opposition	1. Second Turkish invasion.
7 Dec 1974 – 3 Aug 1977	Third Makarios Government	Archbishop Makarios III (1913–1977)	1. Patriotic Front; 2. AKEL	No opposition	1. De facto independence of TFSC.; 2. Makarios-Denktaş Agreement.
3 Aug 1977 – 28 Feb 1983	First Kyprianou Government	Spyros Kyprianou (1932–2002)	DIKO	No opposition	1. Kyprianou-Denktaş Agreement.
28 Feb 1983 – 28 Feb 1988	Second Kyprianou Government	Spyros Kyprianou (1932–2002)	1. DIKO; 2. AKEL	Glafcos Clerides	1. Rename of TFSC to TRNC.
28 Feb 1988 – 28 Feb 1993	Vassiliou Government	George Vassiliou (1931–2026)	AKEL	Glafcos Clerides	
28 Feb 1993 – 28 Feb 1998	First Clerides Government	Glafcos Clerides (1919–2013)	DISY	Demetris Christofias	1. Cypriot S-300 crisis.; 2. Clerides-Denktaş Agreement.
28 Feb 1998 – 28 Feb 2003	Second Clerides Government	Glafcos Clerides (1919–2013)	DISY	Demetris Christofias	
28 Feb 2003 – 28 Feb 2008	Papadopoulos Government	Tassos Papadopoulos (1934–2008)	1. DIKO; 2. AKEL; 3. EDEK; 4. KOSP	Nicos Anastasiades	1. Opening of the first crossing point of the Green Line.; 2. 2004 Annan Plan referendums.; 3. Cyprus accession in the EU.
28 Feb 2008 – 28 Feb 2013	Christofias Government	Demetris Christofias (1946–2019)	AKEL	Nicos Anastasiades	1. Naval Base Explosion in Mari.; 2. 2008–2012 Cyprus talks.; 3. Aphrodite gas field discovery.; 4. Cypriot Presidency of the Council of the EU.; 5. 2012 Cyprus terrorist plot.; 6. 2012–2013 Cypriot financial crisis.
28 Feb 2013 – 28 Feb 2018	First Anastasiades Government	Nicos Anastasiades (born 1946)	1. DISY; 2. DIKO (until 2014); 3. EVROKO (until 2016)	Andros Kyprianou (2013-2021); Stefanos Stefanou (2021-2023)	1. Banking bail-out.; 2. Closure of Cyprus Popular Bank.; 3. Closure of Cyprus Airways.; 4. Closure of Cyprus Cooperative Bank.; 5. 2015–2017 Cyprus talks.
28 Feb 2018 – 28 Feb 2023	Second Anastasiades Government	Nicos Anastasiades (born 1946)	DISY	Andros Kyprianou (2013-2021); Stefanos Stefanou (2021-2023)	1. GeSY implementation.; 2. Minimum Wage implementation.; 3. COVID-19 Pandemic.; 4. EU Sanctions against Russia.; 5. Pandora papers scandal.; 6. Cyprus Confidential scandal.
28 Feb 2023 – present	Christodoulides Government	Nikos Christodoulides (born 1973)	1. DIKO; 2. EDEK; 3. DIPA	Annita Demetriou	1. Amalthea Initiative
