= Andreas Neocleous =

Greek-Cypriot lawyer (1939–2021)

Andreas Neocleous Evripidi (Greek: Ανδρέας Νεοκλέους Ευριπίδη; 3 July 1939 – 1 October 2021) was a Greek-Cypriot lawyer and politician who served as member of the House of Representatives of Cyprus.

== Early life ==
Andreas Neocleous Evripidi was born on 3 July 1939 in Episkopi, Paphos. He earned a law degree from the University of Athens in 1964.

== Career ==
Neocleous began practicing law in 1965, specialising in international investment and international corporate tax law. He was the founder and managing partner of Andreas Neocleous & Co LLC, which became the largest law firm in Cyprus. He participated in EOKA's fight for the liberation of Cyprus from British rule, during which time he was arrested by British troops and imprisoned from 1956 to 1959. From 1970 to 1976, he served as a Member of Parliament for the United Party. In 1974, he participated in the Cypriot coup d'état and was appointed as agricultural minister.

Neocleous held some honorary positions during his career such as honorary fellow of the Center for International Legal Studies, honorary consul of Japan in Cyprus, and honorary legal adviser to the British High Commissioner in Cyprus.

In 2017, Neocleous' law firm Andreas Neocleous & Co was one of many found guilty of bribing a Cypriot deputy attorney general. Shortly thereafter, the firm changed its name to Elias Neocleous; it remains the largest law firm in Cyprus. Two years later, he purchased the Cyprus Mail, the primary English-language newspaper in Cyprus. The following day, all of the newspaper's articles about his former law firm's criminal activities were removed from the newspaper's website, for which Neocleous received much criticism.

== Personal life ==
Neocleous and his wife, Lia, had two sons named Elias and Panayiotis. Both sons also became lawyers.

== Death ==
On 1 October 2021, at the age of 82, Neocleous died from COVID-19 at New General Hospital in Nicosia.
