= International Fair =

International Fair may refer to:

== Fairs ==
- American International Toy Fair, Toy District of New York City
- Buenos Aires International Book Fair, Buenos Aires, Argentina
- China International Fair for Investment and Trade, a trade show in Xiamen, Fujian, China
- Cyprus International Fair
- Damascus International Fair, a trade fair in Syria
- Dar es Salaam International Trade Fair, Dar es Salaam, Tanzania
- Guadalajara International Book Fair, Guadalajara, Mexico
- HANFEXPO, Vienna, Austria
- Havana's International Book Fair, Havana, Cuba
- India International Trade Fair, New Delhi, India
- Intel International Science and Engineering Fair, a scientific research event sponsored by Intel
- International Defence Industry Fair, Turkey
- International Fair Plovdiv, a trade fair in Plovdiv, Bulgaria
- İzmir International Fair, a trade in İzmir, Turkey
- Katowice International Fair, a trade fair in Katowice, Poland
- Nuremberg International Toy Fair, Nuremberg, Germany
- Poznań International Fair, a trade fair in Poznań, Poland
- Tehran International Fair, Tehran, Iran
- Thessaloniki International Fair, Thessaloniki, Greece
- Tokyo International Anime Fair, Tokyo, Japan
- Turin International Book Fair, Turin, Italy
- World's fair, an international exposition held since the mid-19th century

== Organizations ==
- Bureau of International Expositions
- UFI, association of trade show organizers, fairground owners, and associations of the exhibition industry

== Places ==
- International Fair Association Grounds, a former baseball ground in Buffalo, New York
- Maltese International Trade Fair Grounds, in Ta'Qali, Malta

== See also ==
- List of world's fairs
- List of world expositions
