= Cyprus Mail =

Cypriot English daily newspaper

- Type: Daily newspaper
- Format: Berliner
- Owner: Neo Cymed Publishing Limited
- Founded: 1945
- Headquarters: Nicosia, Cyprus
- Website: cyprus-mail.com

The Cyprus Mail is the only English-language daily newspaper published in Cyprus. Established in 1945, it is published every day except Monday, and most of the local articles are available on its website.

According to eurotopics the political orientation of Cyprus Mail is liberal.

== History ==
With the demise of the Cyprus Times in 1960, the Cyprus Mail remained the only English-language newspaper in Cyprus until the establishment of the Cyprus Weekly in 1979. Despite claiming to take an independent political position and to have no local political affiliations, it is widely regarded as a politically conservative and right-leaning publication.

In its early years, the Cyprus Mail was the main rival to the Cyprus Times, another English-language newspaper founded in Cyprus during the period of British rule. At that time, the Cyprus Mail was seen as more right-wing than the left-leaning Cyprus Times, especially in its tendency to oppose the unification of Cyprus with Greece. Due to this, it was disliked by Greek-Cypriots and circulated mainly among the British colonial administrative and military personnel. It later took a "pro-confederate" stance on the Cyprus dispute and supported the controversial 2004 Annan Plan, which led to allegations of anti-Greek bias and of "normalizing" the Turkish occupation in the northern part of the island.

== Ownership ==
The newspaper was purchased in 2019 by Andreas Neocleous, a lawyer and former EOKA member who was previously found guilty of bribing deputy attorney general Rikos Erotokritou. Criticism came when articles referring to his conviction were removed from the website of the newspaper the day after ownership of the newspaper changed.

Andreas Neocleous Law Firm changed its name to Elias Neocleous Law Firm after its conviction for bribery of the Deputy Attorney General.

The owner of the newspaper is now Elias and Panayiotis Neocleous and the political line has changed accordingly.

== See also ==
- List of newspapers in Cyprus
