= Pantelis Kouros =

Cypriot politician (1932–2021)

Deputy Minister to the President
- In office 30 April 1993 – 28 February 2003
- Preceded by: Patroklos Stavrou
- Succeeded by: Christodoulos Pashiardis

Personal details
- Born: 10 December 1932 Nicosia, British Cyprus
- Died: 8 May 2021 (aged 88)
- Party: Democratic Rally

Pantelis Kouros (Greek: Παντελής Κούρος; 10 December 1932 – 8 May 2021) was a Greek Cypriot politician. A member of the Democratic Rally, he served as Deputy Minister to the President from 1993 to 2003.

== Biography ==
Kouros was born in Nicosia in 1932, where he attended Pancyprian Gymnasium. He earned degrees in public relations and business administration. In 1969, he became a close associate of Glafcos Clerides, who founded Eniaion. He joined Clerides' office when the latter became President.

From 1976 to 1993, he directed the political office of the Democratic Rally party. He became Deputy Minister to the President in the Glafcos Clerides Government 1993 and continued serving in the position in the 1998 Government. He remained in the position until the end of Clerides' term in 2003.

Pantelis Kouros died on 8 May 2021 at the age of 88.
