= The Cyprus Times =

English-language newspaper

- Type: Weekly newspaper
- Format: Broadsheet
- Founder: Edward Henry Vizetelly
- Founded: 14 May 1880
- Political alignment: Liberalism
- Language: English

The Cyprus Times, also known as Times of Cyprus, was an English-language newspaper published in Larnaca, in Cyprus from 1880, following the island becoming a British protectorate in 1878. It was founded by Edward Henry Vizetelly, who also acted as its first editor. Vizetelly had been a war correspondent for the British newspaper The Daily News, and The New York Times.

== History ==
In its early years, The Cyprus Times was accused by British-based reviewers of being too critical of British colonial rule in Cyprus, primarily because it would berate the British government for not taking full control of the island from the Ottoman Empire. At the same time, it was also criticised for being too interested in local racing news and gossip from colonial parties on Cyprus rather than social and political events on the island. Yet the newspaper was also a campaigning voice, generally liberal in its outlook, and a significant force in calling for Britain to formally annex Cyprus from the Ottomans, with the publication of numerous articles claiming that the midway house, whereby Britain administered the island but it remained legally the property of Turkey, was resulting in the impoverishment of the Cypriot people.

Amongst the notable figures working for The Cyprus Times was Nikos Sampson. Despite working as a photographer for the newspaper, Sampson was also a fervent Greek nationalist, who joined the Greek liberation movement on the island EOKA. In 1974, he was made the puppet President of Cyprus following the military overthrow of the elected leader President Archbishop Makarios in July of that year. Earlier, during the anti-British struggle in Cyprus 1955-1959, Sampson was accused by the British colonial authorities of being a member of EOKA and, in 1957, he was charged with murder. Amongst those killed by EOKA, and possibly by Sampson himself, was a fellow journalist on The Cyprus Times Angus MacDonald. The trial of Sampson failed due to claims the police had obtained a confession from Sampson under torture, but Sampson later admitted the killings, and claimed this allowed him to be first on the scene to capture the news photographs. Sampson later went on to found the Greek language newspaper, Makhi (Combat).

During the EOKA struggle, The Cyprus Times was owned and edited by the liberal minded Charles Foley, who was born in India and arrived in Cyprus in search of 'a quiet life' having worked previously for the Daily Express. Instead, he landed in the middle of the Cypriot civil and anti-colonial war. Foley was widely regarded as a sympathetic character for Cypriots, although he was a firm believer in independence for Cyprus rather than union with Greece. In 1958, he stated, 'I have sympathy for the Cypriots as a civilized people who have for generations been denied the ordinary rights of self-rule and freedom.'

Foley's anti-colonial stance led to him being prosecuted in 1956 by the British colonial government in Cyprus for breaking the Emergency Powers Act (Cyprus). At a court hearing on 2 January 1957, Foley was fined £50 for publishing an article on the British treatment of Greek Cypriots, under the title 'Hatred, Despair and Anger' which was judged 'likely to be prejudicial to the maintenance of public order'. The newspaper itself, Times Publications Ltd, was fined £1. The newspaper was even accused of actively supporting Archbishop Makarios in the Parliament of the United Kingdom by the Conservative and Unionist MP, Major Patrick Wall. Foley himself was even charged under Section 43 of the Cyprus Emergency Regulations for publishing articles critical of the British governor in Cyprus.

Under Foley, the circulation of the newspaper was reported by Time Magazine to be 5,400 copies.

Foley also employed the Armenian journalist Georges der Parthogh from 1955 to 1959, who went on to found and edit another English language weekly newspaper, The Cyprus Weekly in 1979, in partnership with two other veteran journalists, Alex Efty and Andreas Hadjipapas.The Cypriot poet and novelist Costas Montis was editor of the literary section from 1956 until 1960 when the newspaper closed.

== Closure ==
According to Foley, the newspaper closed for financial reasons, but its demise was also reported as symbolising the end of British colonial rule in Cyprus. At the time of its closure, the only surviving English language newspaper was The Cyprus Mail.

== Revival ==
The title was briefly revived in 2004, by the Turkish Cypriot newspaper, Kibrisli, as an English language supplement, but this was only available in the Turkish areas and ceased publication in 2009.
