= Progressive Front =

Cypriot political party (1970–76)

The Progressive Front (Greek: Προοδευτική Παράταξις) was a right-wing political party in Cyprus.

== History ==
The party was established in 1970 as a split from the Patriotic Front, with support from the right-wing PEK farmers union and the SEK labour union. Shortly after its formation the Front absorbed the Progressive Party established by Nikos Sampson. In the 1970 parliamentary elections the Front won seven of the 35 seats in the House of Representatives. It drew much of its support from the agricultural community on the island.

Following the 1974 coup and subsequent Turkish invasion, the party collapsed due to some of its members having supported the coup, including Nikos Sampson who had been installed as President after the coup. In the lead-up to the 1976 parliamentary elections, the Front's leading members united with members of Eniaion to form the new Democratic Rally party. The party was officially dissolved in 1976.

== Ideology ==
The party was in favour of a closer relationship with Greece, although it stated that this should be as a result of self-determination of the people.
