= 1972–1973 Cypriot ecclesiastical coup attempt =

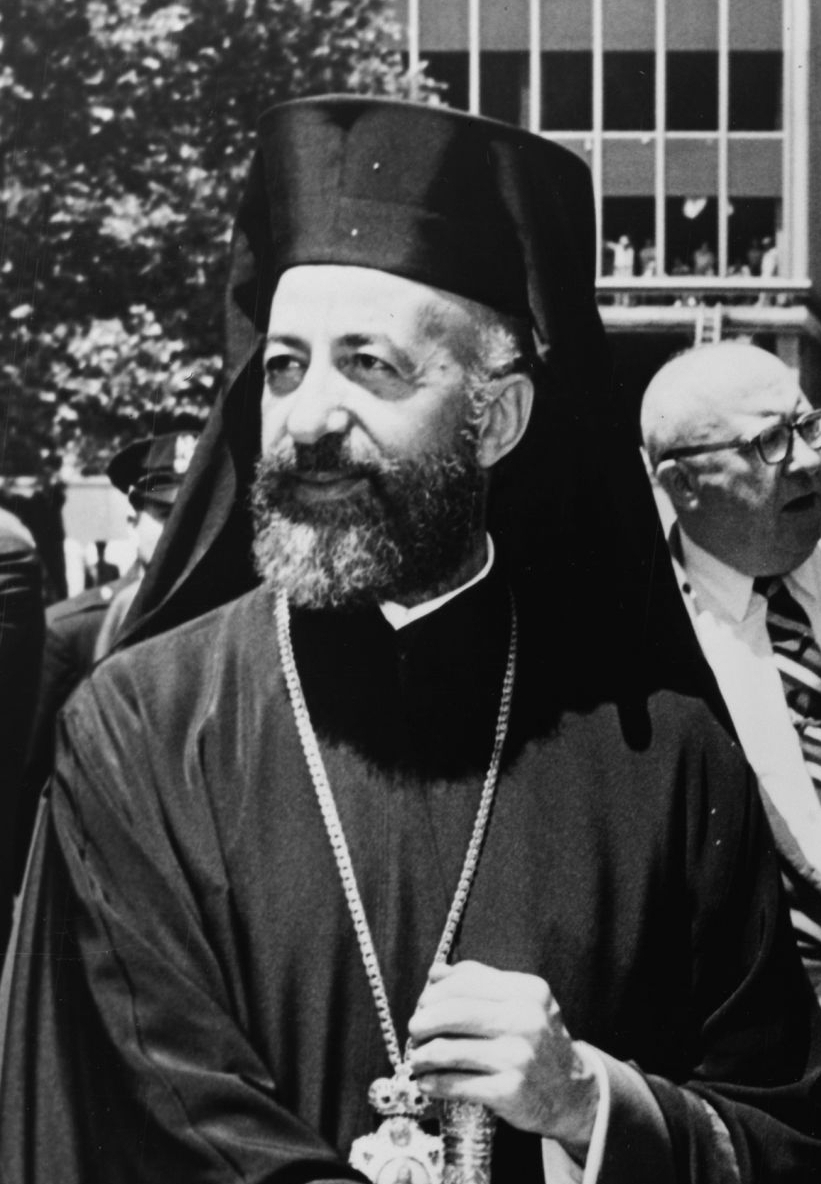
Archbishop Makarios III of Cyprus.

The Ecclesiastical coup is the name given to the events staged by three bishops of the Orthodox Church of Cyprus against the President of the Republic of Cyprus, Archbishop Makarios III, in the period from March 1972 to July 1973.

== Background ==
At the session of the Holy Synod of the Orthodox Church of Cyprus held on 2 March 1972, Metropolitan Gennadios (Machairiotis) of Paphos, Metropolitan Anthemos (Machairiotis) of Kition and Metropolitan Kyprianos (Kyriakides) of Kyrenia tabled a motion proposing that Archbishop Makarios III resign the Presidency of the Republic of Cyprus. They held that the holding of secular office by a cleric was against the canons of the Church. The Synod released an announcement reporting the position of the bishops, and stating that the Archbishop would announce his response at a later time.

Makarios issued his response on 19 March. In it he accused the three bishops of having conspired among themselves and with other people outside the church, hinting at the Junta of the Colonels ruling Greece at the time, and at George Grivas, leader of the EOKA guerrilla organization, who had secretly returned to Cyprus. Makarios argued that the office of President of the Republic of Cyprus could not be called secular at a time when the Orthodox Greeks of Cyprus were struggling for their national survival, and that in the circumstances the holding of secular office did not confer on the Archbishop any personal reward, but was an onerous and bitter duty which he could not shirk.

The bishops maintained their position and the crisis continued. It finally came to a climax after the unopposed re-election of Makarios to the Presidency of the Republic of Cyprus on 8 February 1973. The three bishops summoned Makarios to account for himself before an extraordinary session of the Holy Synod which they called for 7 March 1973. Makarios replied on 6 March, stating that the Synod the three bishops had called was unconstitutional and therefore any decision it reached would be invalid. The three bishops met among themselves and decided to defrock Makarios.

Makarios called a Major Synod comprising representatives from all Orthodox Patriarchates. They all responded, except the Church of Greece and the Ecumenical Patriarchate whose seat is in Istanbul, Turkey. The Major Synod convened on 5–6 July 1973. It decided to annul the defrocking of Makarios, and to call the three bishops to audience so they could express their views. The three bishops refused to attend the Major Synod, which convened again on 14 July and defrocked them.

== Return of the bishops in the 1974 secular coup ==
When Makarios was forced to flee the island after the military coup of 15 July 1974, the three defrocked bishops entered the limelight again. The coup leaders, having appointed Nikos Giorgades Sampson as President of the Republic, also installed Gennadios as the new Archbishop of Cyprus. Sampson was sworn in as president in a ceremony conducted by Gennadios in the presence of Kyprianos and Anthemos. However, the coupist government collapsed on 23 July as a result of the Turkish military invasion of Cyprus on 20 July. Glafkos Klerides, as Speaker of the House of Representatives, constitutionally took over the powers of the President in the absence of Makarios, but agreed to be sworn in as President before Gennadios, an action which Klerides's detractors suggest was indicative of a pro-coupist orientation on his part at the time. With the return of Makarios to the Presidency and the Archbishopric in December 1974, the three defrocked bishops faded from the political scene.
