= Kykkos Monastery =

Monastery in Cyprus

Kykkos
- Κύκκος
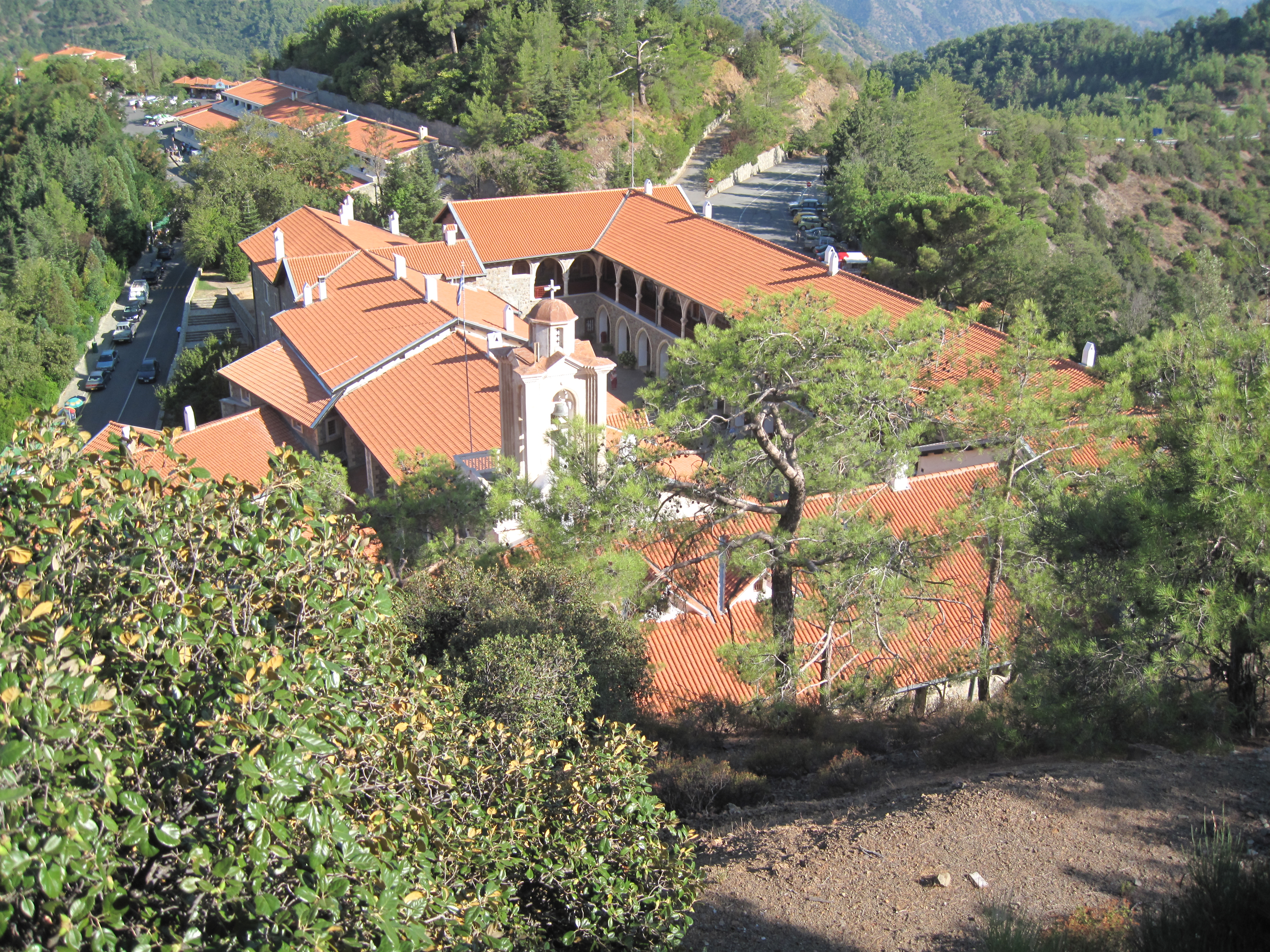
- Kykkos Monastery

- Location within Cyprus
- Interactive map of Kykkos

Monastery information
- Full name: The Holy, Royal and Stavropegic Monastery of Kykkos
- Order: Orthodox monasticism
- Established: 11th century
- Dedication: Virgin Mary
- Celebration: August 15, September 8
- Diocese: Church of Cyprus
- Controlled churches: Metochi Kykkou

People
- Founder: Alexios I Komnenos
- Prior: Nikiphoros, Metropolitan of Kykkos and Tylliria

Architecture
- Style: Byzantine

Site
- Location: Troodos, Nicosia District
- Country: Cyprus
- Coordinates: 34.984°N 32.741°E

Kykkos Monastery (Greek: Ιερά Μονή Κύκκου or Κύκκος [locally [ˈt͡ʃikʰos]] for short, Turkish: Cikko Manastırı) lies 20 km (12 mi) west of Pedoulas, and is one of the wealthiest monasteries in Cyprus.

The Holy Monastery of the Virgin of Kykkos was founded around the end of the 11th century by the Byzantine emperor Alexios I Komnenos (1081–1118). The monastery lies at an altitude of 1,318 m (4,324 ft) on the north west face of the Troodos Mountains. There are no remains of the original monastery as it was burned down many times. The first president of Cyprus, Archbishop Makarios III started his ecclesiastical career there in 1926 as a monk.

== History ==
According to tradition as written by Vasil Grigorovich-Barsky –a Ukrainian pilgrim who travelled to Kykkos Monastery in 1735– a virtuous hermit called Esaias was living in a cave on the mountain of Kykkos. One day, the Byzantine governor of the island, doux Manuel Boutoumites, who was spending the summer at a village of Marathasa due to the heat, went into the forest to hunt. Having lost his way in the forest, he met Monk Esaias and asked him to show him the way. The hermit was not interested in the things of this world would not answer his questions.

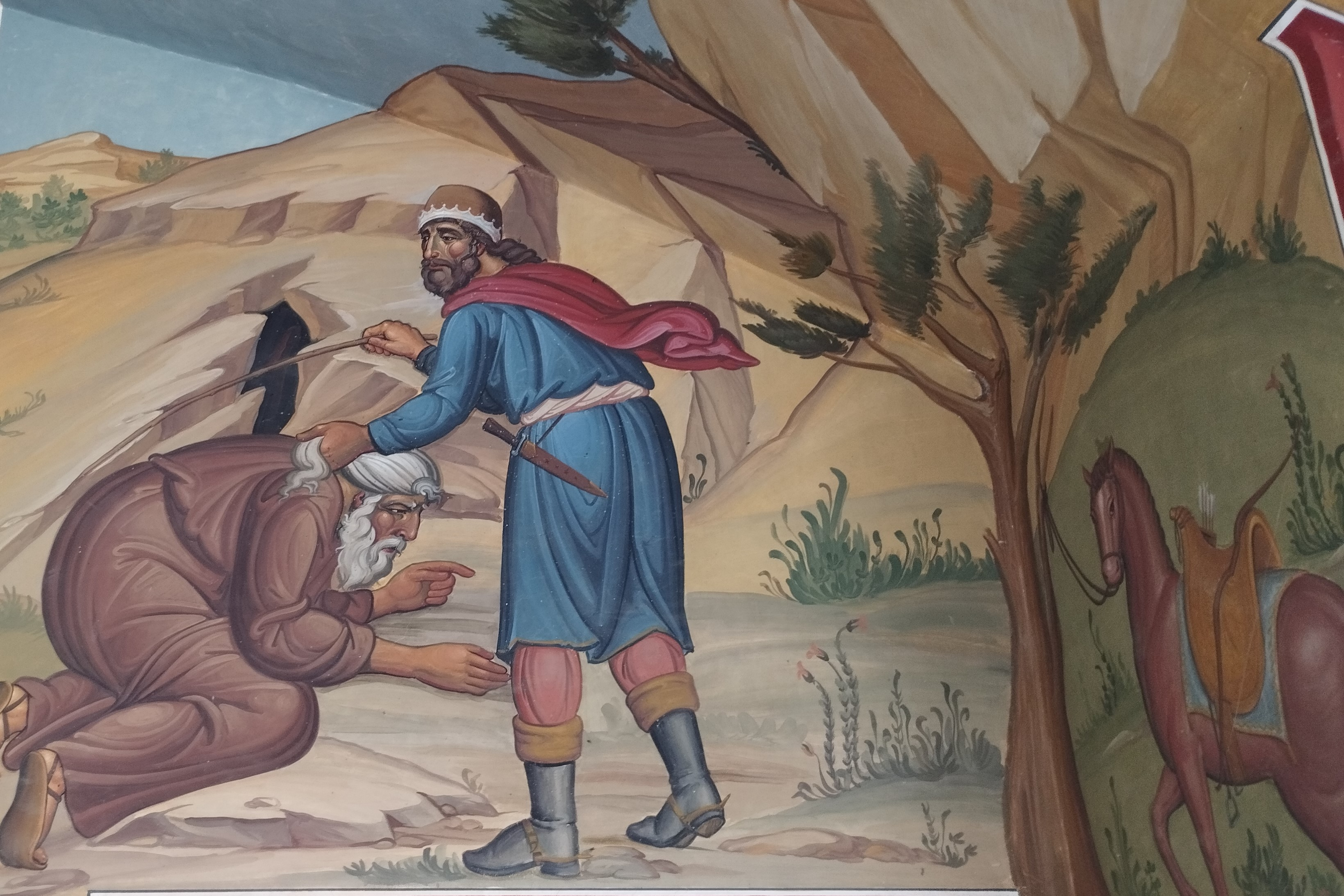
Boutoumites hitting Monk Esias

Boutoumites got angry at Esaias's indifference and called him names and even maltreated him. Not long after, when the doux returned to Nicosia, he fell ill with an incurable illness by the name of lethargia. In his terrible condition, he remembered how inhumanely he had treated the hermit Esaias and asked God to cure him so that he might go to ask the hermit personally for forgiveness. And this came to pass. But God had appeared in front of the hermit and revealed to him that the very thing that had happened had been planned by the divine will and advised him to ask Boutoumites to bring the icon of the Virgin, which had been painted by the Apostle Luke, to Cyprus.

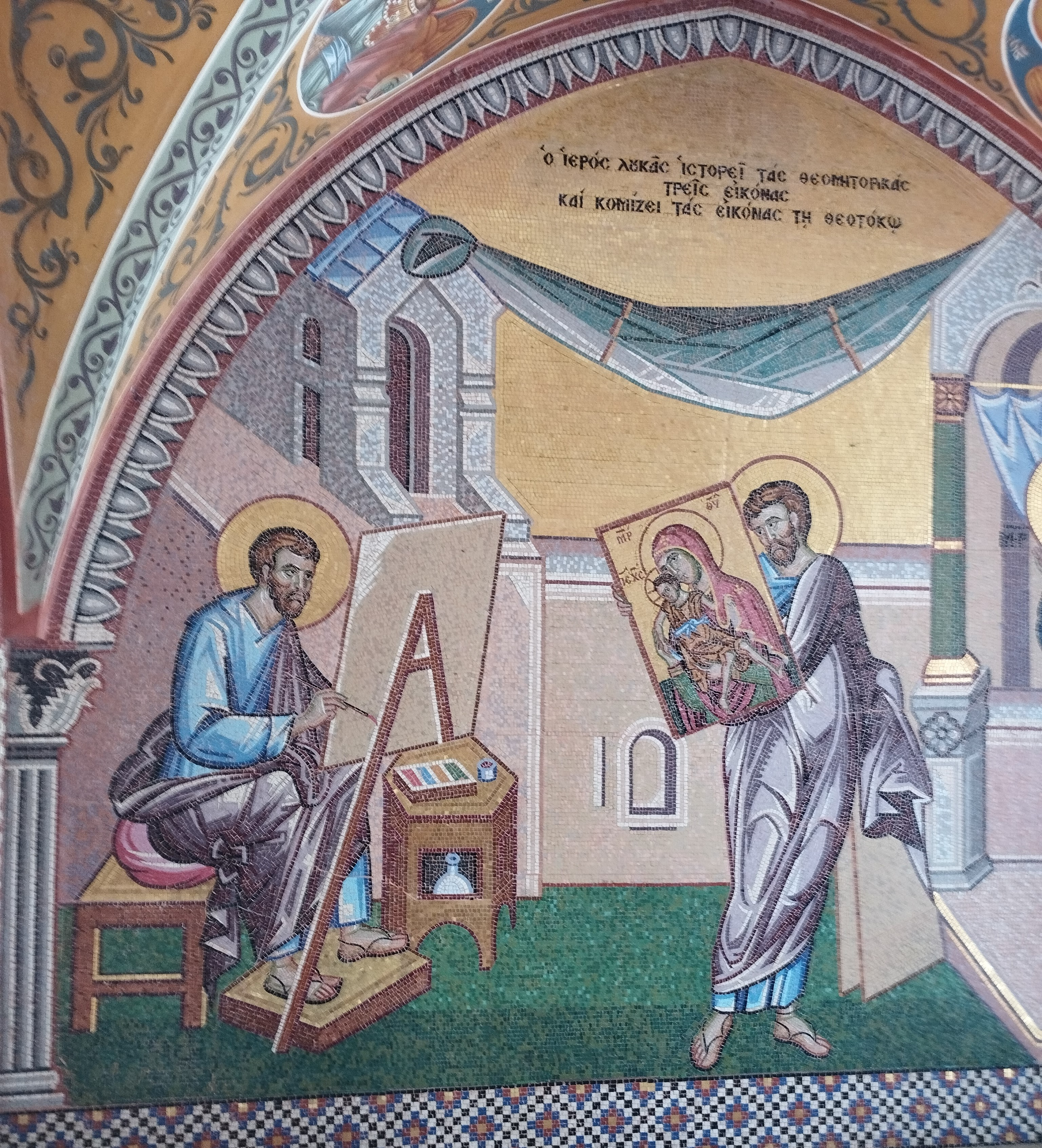
The Apostle Luke painting the icon of the Virgin

The icon was kept in the imperial palace in Constantinople. When Boutoumites heard the hermit's wish, he was taken aback because he considered such a thing impossible. Then Esaias explained to him that it was a matter of divine wish, and they agreed to travel to Constantinople together.

Boutoumites could not find the right opportunity to present himself in front of the Emperor to ask for the icon. For this reason, he provided Esaias with other icons and other necessary things and sent him back to Cyprus, at the same time placating him that he would soon see the Emperor. By divine dispensation, the daughter of the emperor had fallen ill with the same illness that had struck Boutoumites. The latter grasped the opportunity and went to see the Emperor Alexios III Angelos. He recounted to him his personal experience with the Esaias and assured him that his daughter would be cured if he sent the holy icon of the Virgin to Cyprus. In his desperation, the Emperor, seeing no other option, agreed. His daughter became well instantly. The Emperor, however, not wanting to be parted from the icon of the Virgin, called a first-class painter and ordered him to paint an exact copy of the icon with the aim of sending this one to Cyprus.

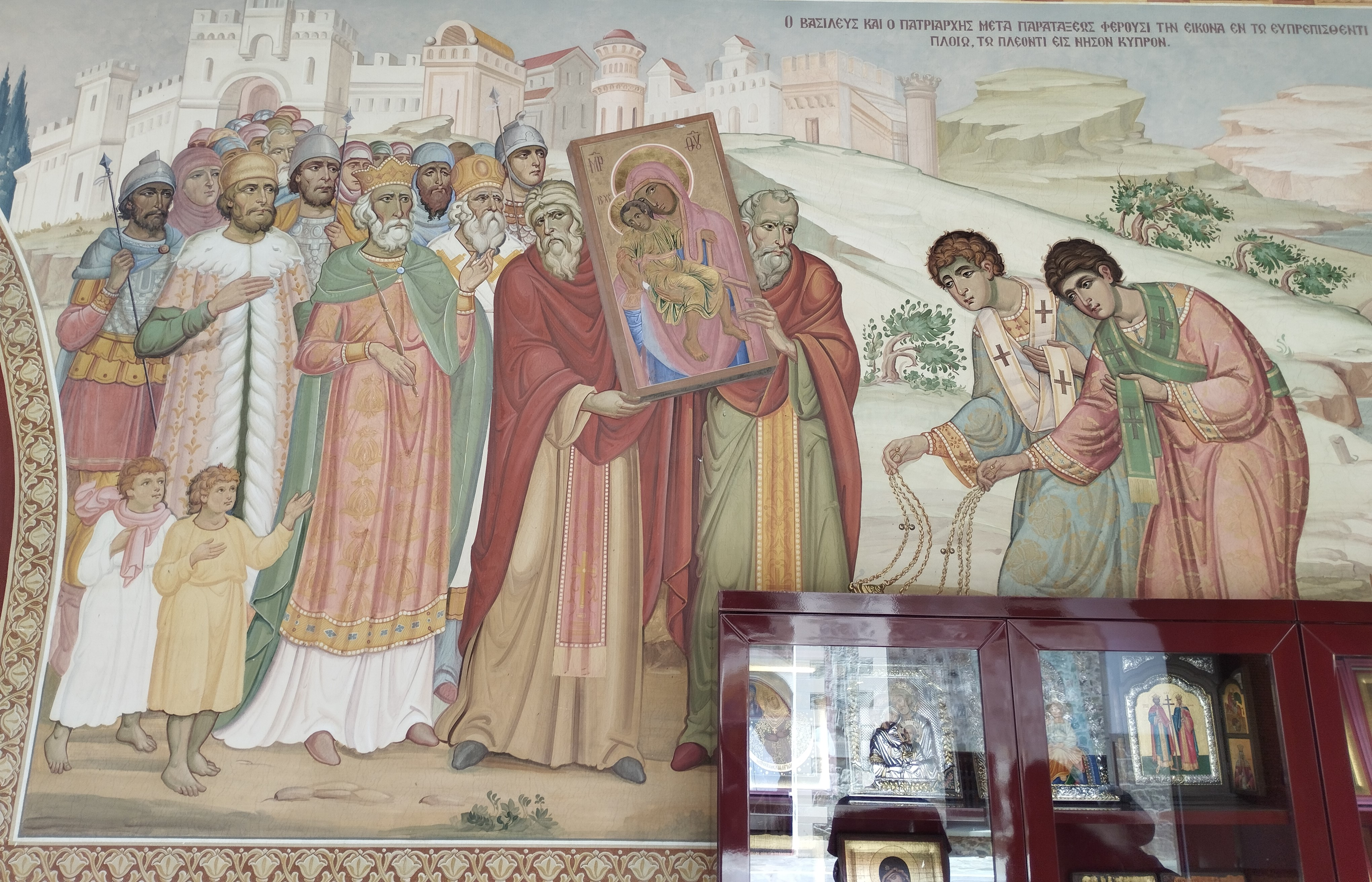
The procession of the icon from the coast to the Troödos Mountains

In the evening the Mother of God herself appeared in a dream to the Emperor and told him that her wish was for her icon to be sent to Cyprus and for the copy to be kept by the Emperor. On the following day, the royal boat with the icon of the Virgin departed for Cyprus. During the procession of the icon from the coast to the Troodos Mountains, according to legend, the trees, participating in the welcoming ceremonies, were piously bending their trunks and branches. With patronage provided by Emperor Alexios Komnenos a church and a monastery were built at Kykkos, where the icon of the Virgin was deposited.

According to another tradition, still preserved by the people, a bird with a human voice was flying around the area singing:
Kykkou, Kykkou, Kykkos' hill
A monastery the site shall fill
A golden girl shall enter in
And never shall come out again

The "golden girl" refers to the icon of the Virgin, while the monastery is the Holy Royal and Stauropegial Monastery of Kykkos, which has sheltered the icon for over nine hundred years.

The church of the monastery were destroyed three times in its history. The current church dates to 1745.

== The icon of Virgin Mary ==
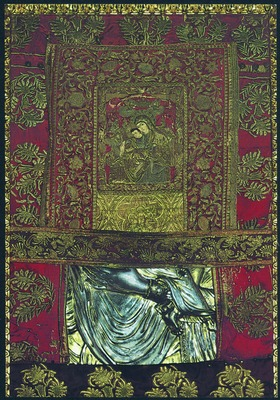
The protective tissue covering the icon

Throughout the centuries locals have revered the icon and have attributed miracles to its presence. In 1760 a success in the struggle against locust devastation, a frequent problem at the time, was believed to be the work of the icon. The icon has also served as a template for other paintings depicting the Madonna in eastern Orthodoxy. The icon is never looked at, and its top half remains hidden behind a protective covering as it is said that whoever looks at it will be blinded. The last person to have seen the icon was the Pope and Patriarch of Alexandria Gerasimos, in 1669. The icon is rarely uncovered. In recent years there was a drought affecting Cyprus, in response to which the fathers took the icon to her throne, and read special supplications for rain, whilst looking away from the uncovered icon.

== Other relics ==
To the right of the icon is a bronze arm, and a sword fish saw. The arm serves as a reminder of the story of a Turk who tried to light a cigarette using one of the vigil lamps and he was cursed and suffered a gangrenous arm. The saw from the sword fish represents the gratefulness of sailors who prayed to Our Lady of Kykkos to save them from the storms of the sea.

== Metochion Kykkou ==
Kykkos Monastery maintains separate grounds in Engomi, Nicosia called Metochion Kykkou. The land on which it lies was acquired over the years by the monastery through bequests. With the city's rapid expansion, the area which was once the outskirts was now prime property. Despite this, much of it is still used for agricultural purposes. Up until the construction of its purpose-built premises, the Cyprus State Fair was held on these grounds.

In 1974, Makarios III went to Metochion Kykkou for refuge whilst under pursuit by the military junta. As a result, the building was hit by tank fire and part of it collapsed. He was later buried on the grounds.

== Metropolitanate ==
The current abbot, Nikephoros, whose symbol is the bee, was made a bishop. His full title is "Right Reverend Metropolitan of Kykkos and Tillyria Monsigneur Nikephoros". He stood for election to become Archbishop of Cyprus.

== Throni ==
The grave of Archbishop Makarios III is located in Throni, 3 km (1.9 mi) west of Kykkos.

== Gallery ==
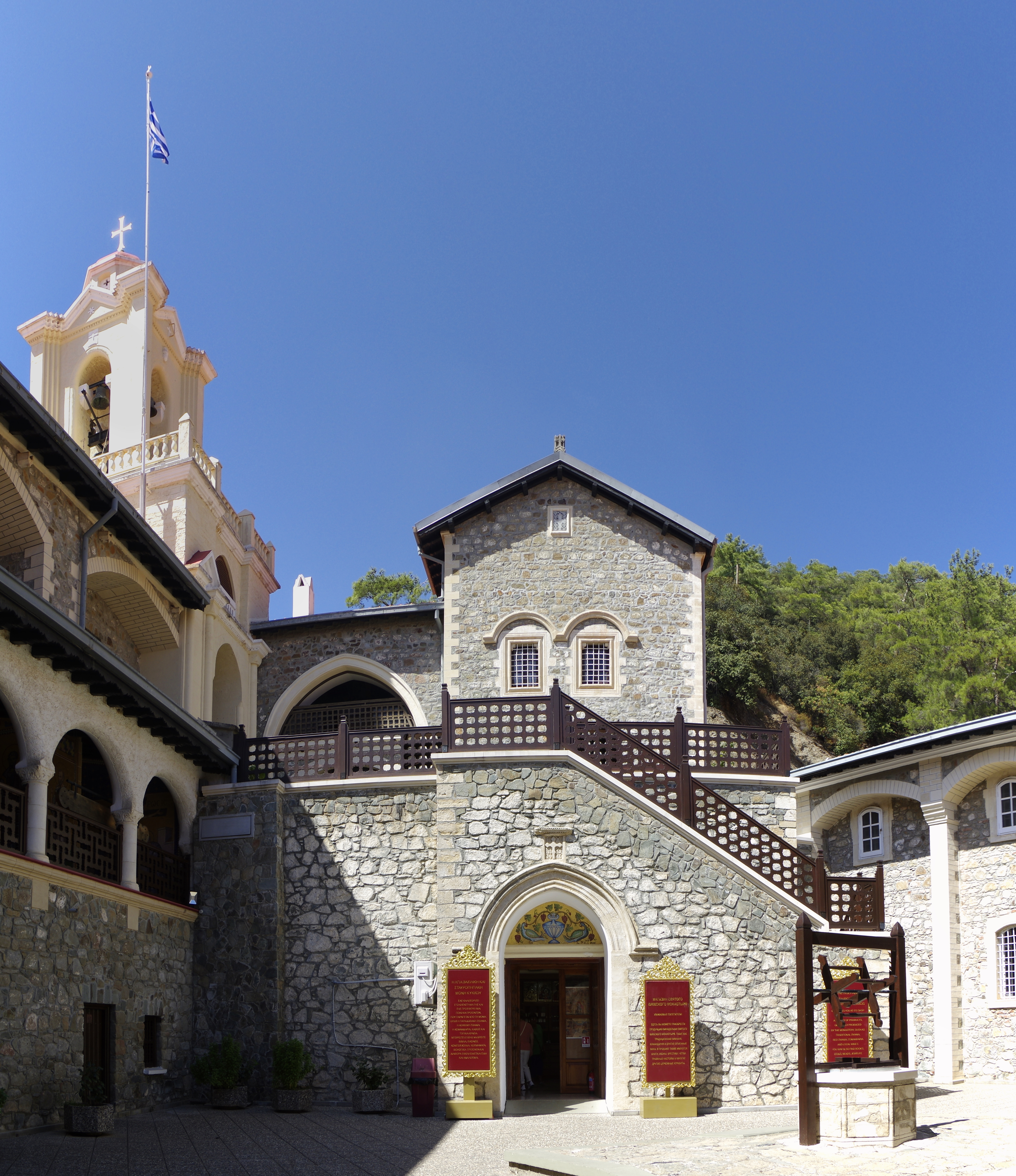
Kykkos Monastery

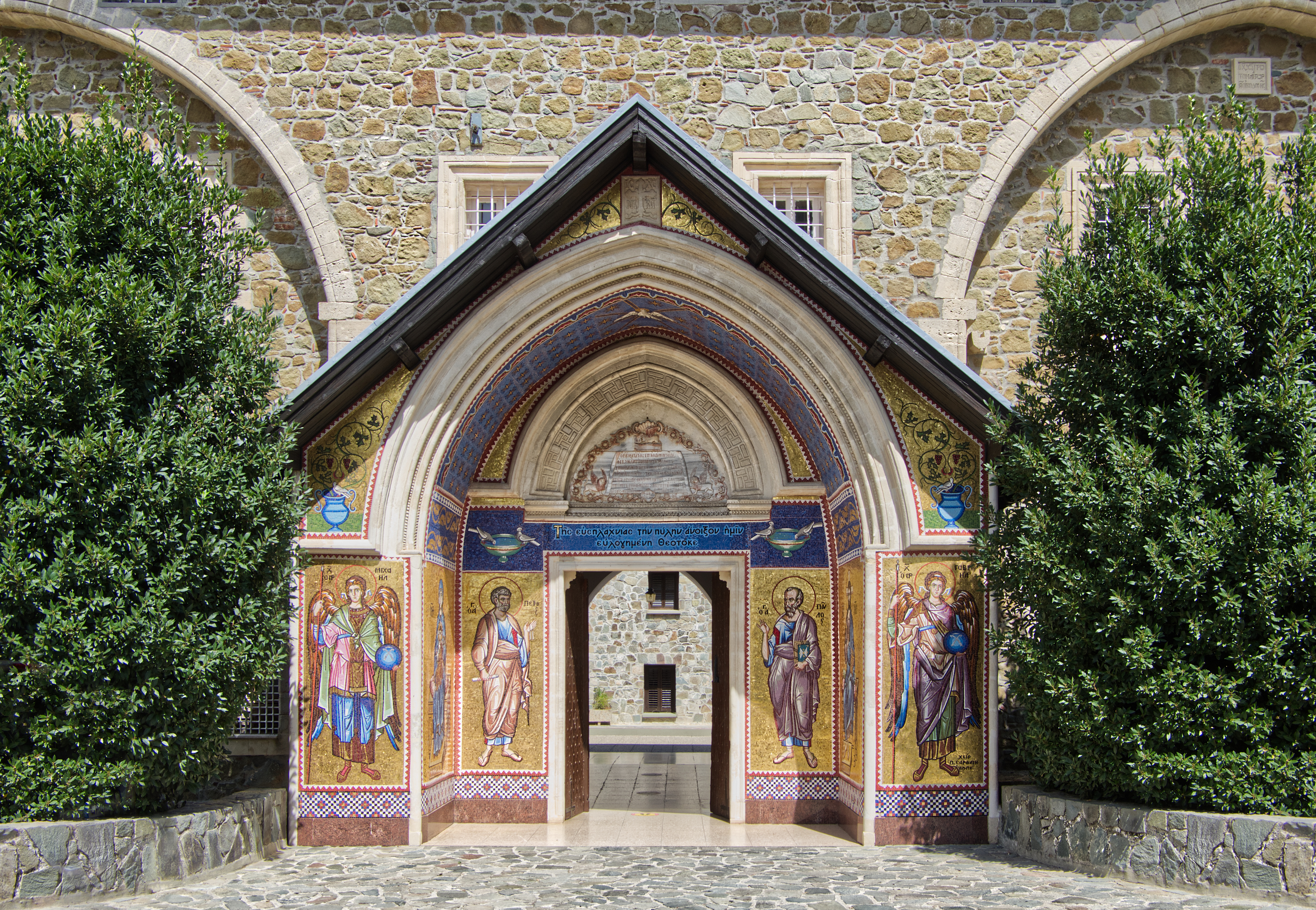
Monastery entrance

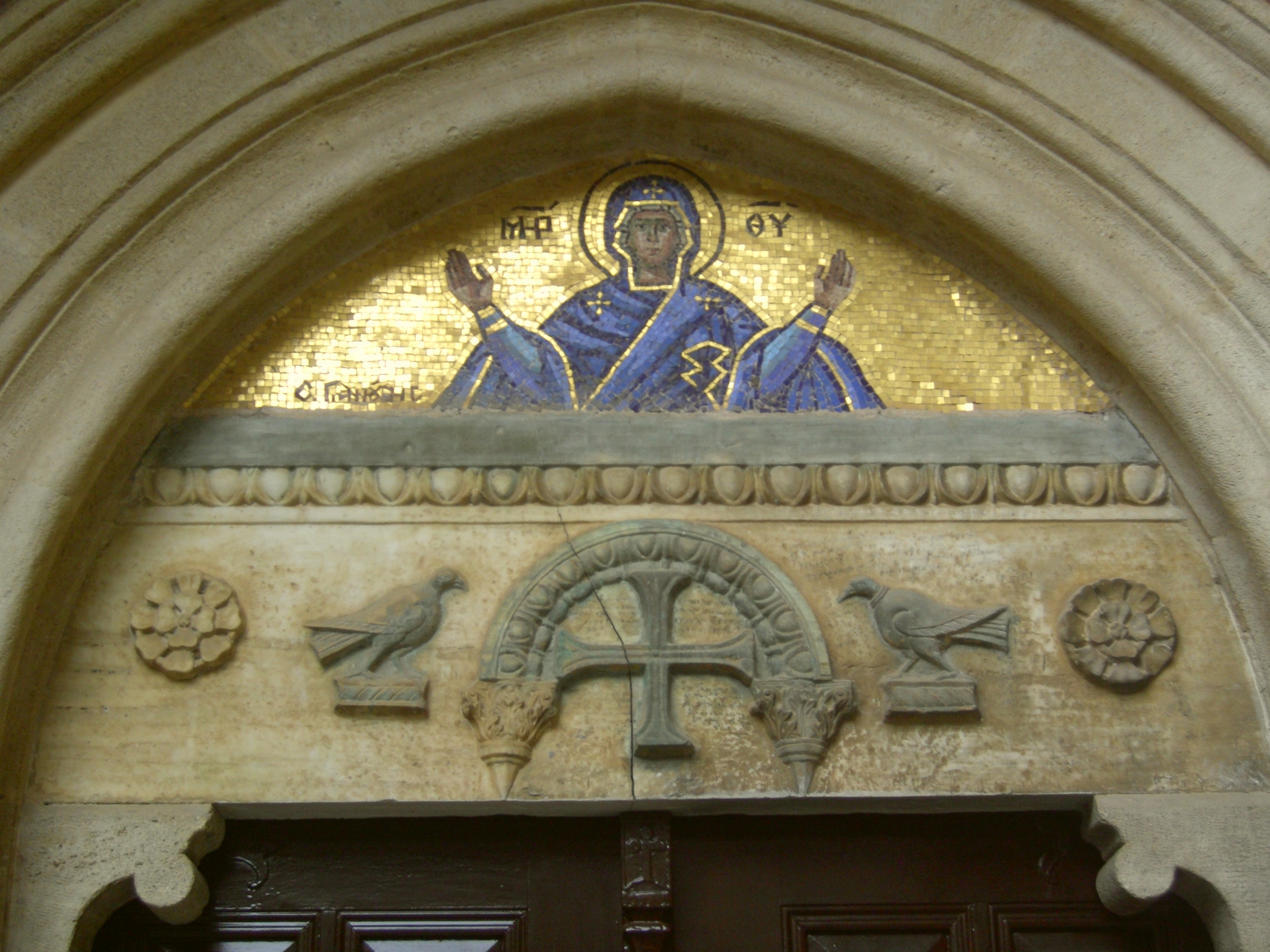
Mosaic on top of the archway

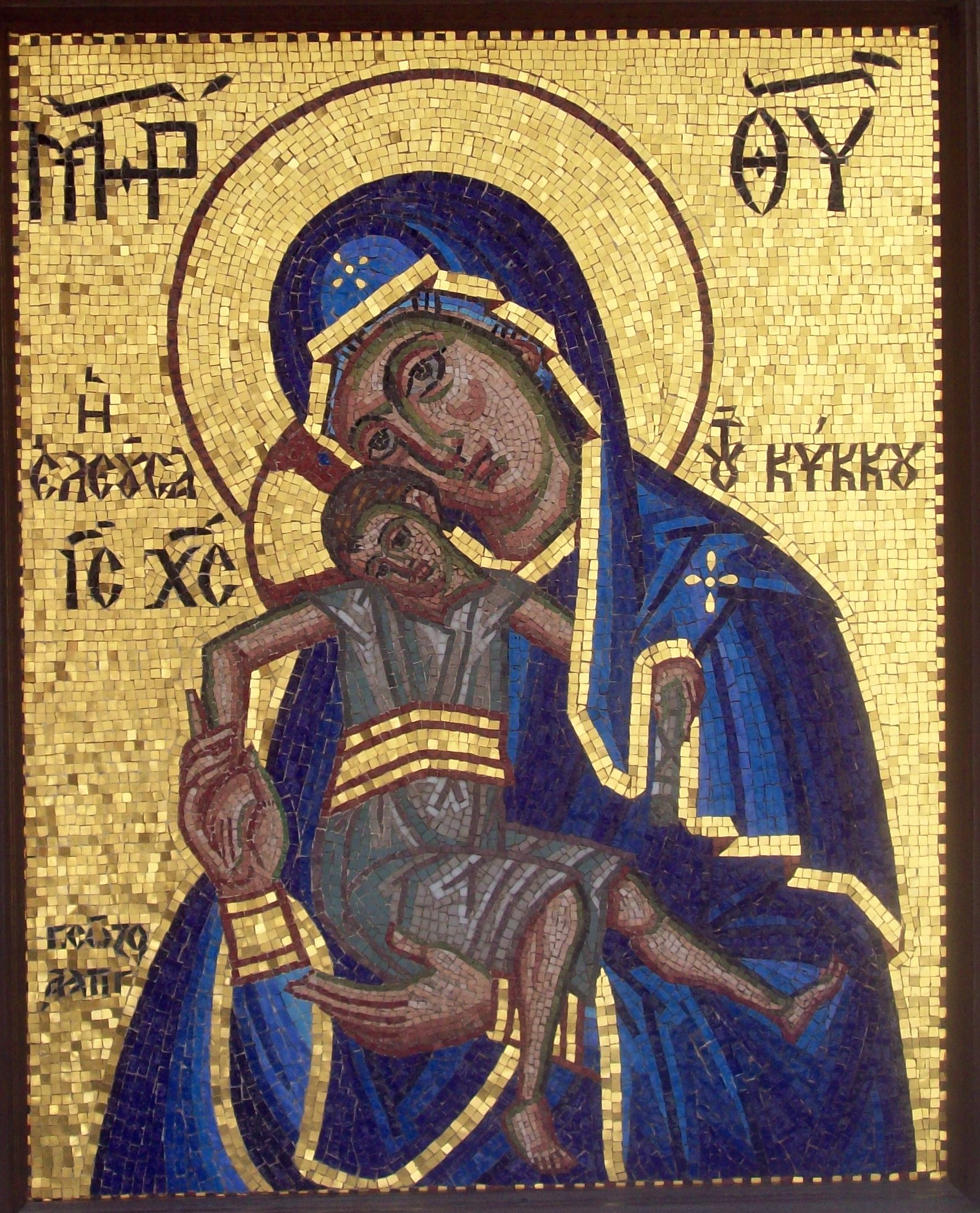
Mosaic depiction of Virgin Mary

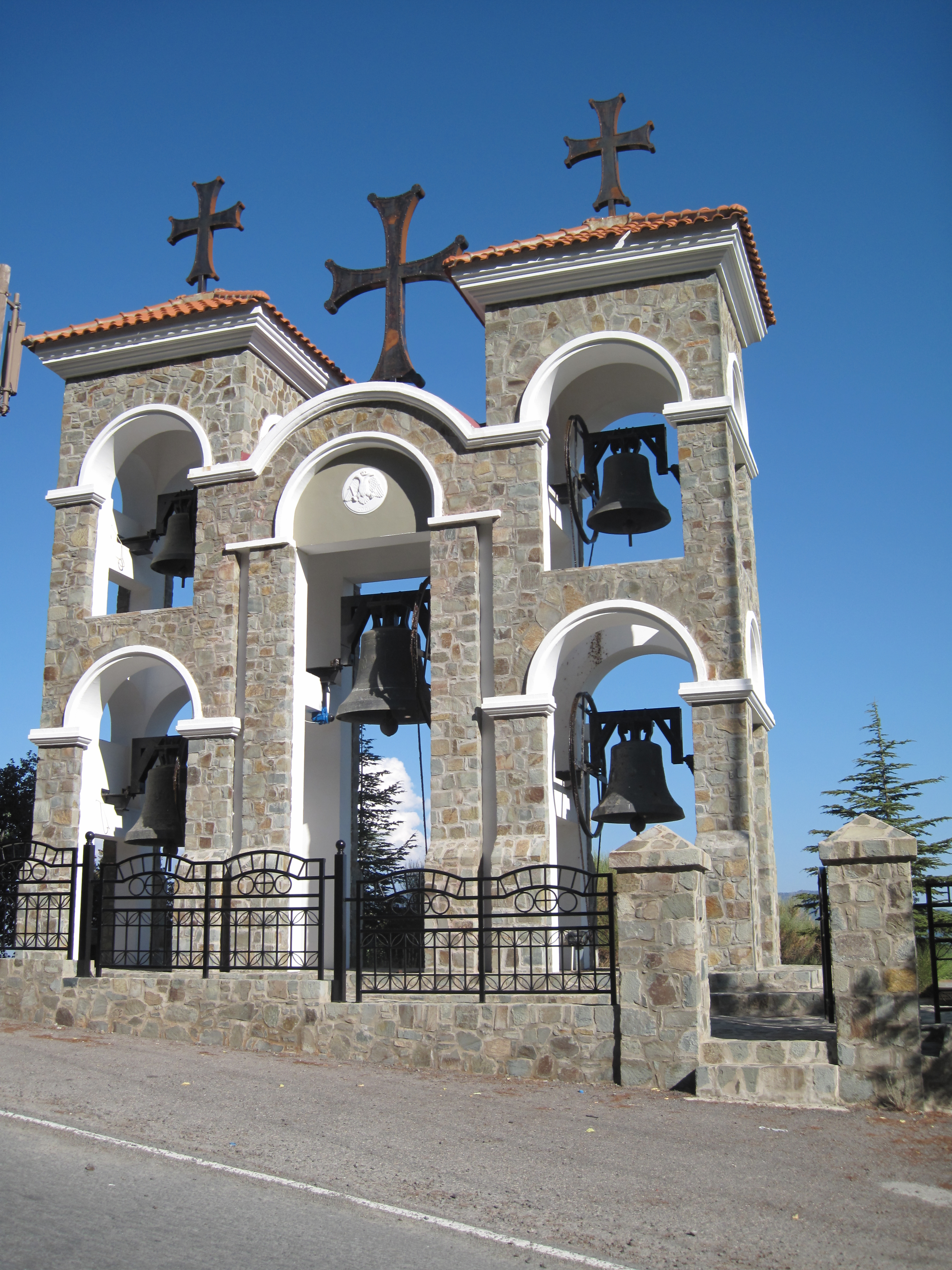
A new belfry

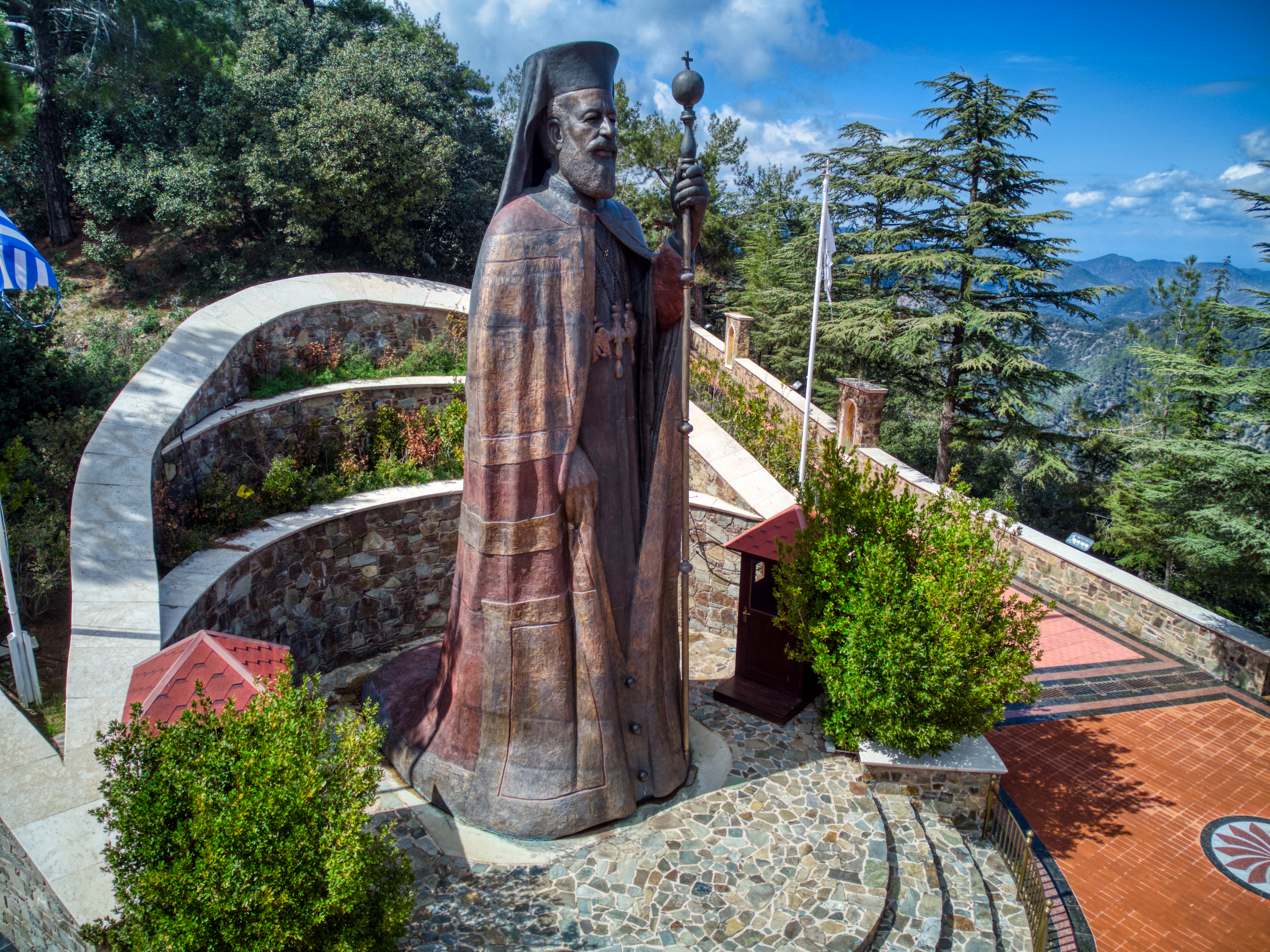
The statue of Archbishop Makarios III near the Kykkos Monastery

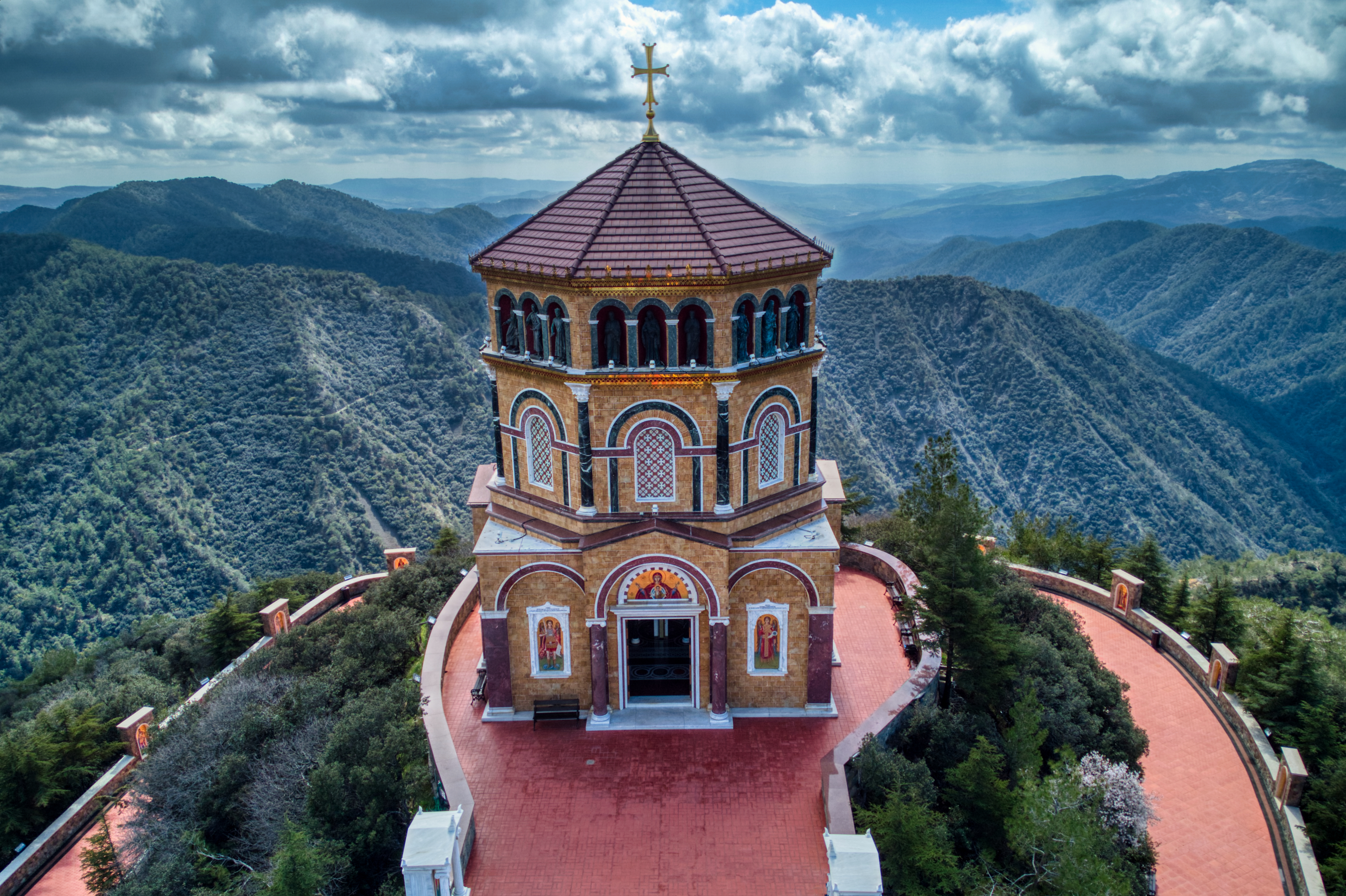
Throni, near the grave of Archbishop Makarios III
