= Spyridon Tetenes =

Greek diplomat

Spyridon Tetenes (Greek: Σπυρίδων Τετενές; 1908, Brăila – 24 July 1977) was a Greek diplomat who was Foreign Minister after the coup d'état of November 25, 1973, by Brigadier General Dimitrios Ioannidis against the junta of George Papadopoulos.

He resigned his post on July 8, 1974, ostensibly for health reasons, though The New York Times reported the next day that "reliable sources" said his resignation was to protest Greece's worsening relations with Turkey and Cyprus as well as increasing military influence in foreign policy. He died in Geneva on 24 July 1977.
