= Patriotic Front (Cyprus) =

Patriotic Front Πατριωτικό Μέτωπο
- Leader: Glafcos Clerides
- Founded: 1959
- Dissolved: 1969
- Preceded by: United Democratic Reconstruction Front
- Succeeded by: Eniaion; Progressive Front; Progressive Party; Democratic National Party; Movement for Social Democracy
- Headquarters: Nicosia, Cyprus
- Ideology: Enosis; Nationalism; Conservatism

The Patriotic Front (Greek: Πατριωτικό Μέτωπο) was a political party in Cyprus led by Glafcos Clerides.

== History ==
The party was formed in 1959 as a replacement for the United Democratic Reconstruction Front by a loose coalition of supporters of Makarios III, including the district leaders of EOKA.

The Front won the pre-independence elections in 1960, taking 30 of the 35 seats reserved for Greek Cypriots. However, the party was dissolved in the late 1960s, breaking into several factions, including Eniaion, the Progressive Front, the Progressive Party and the Democratic National Party.

== Ideology ==
The party was initially a personal party for Makarios III, but later evolved into a conservative and nationalist party.
