= Elias Neocleous =

Law firm in Cyprus

Elias Neocleous & Co. LLC
- Headquarters: Limassol, Cyprus
- No. of offices: 7
- No. of lawyers: 144
- Major practice areas: Full-service firm
- Date founded: 2017 (Limassol)
- Company type: LLC
- Website: www.neo.law

Elias Neocleous & Co. LLC is the largest law firm in Cyprus. The firm has more than 140 fee-earners operating out of three offices in Cyprus and an international network of offices in the main destinations for investment via Cyprus.

The firm Elias Neocleous & Co LLC replaced the earlier firm Andreas Neocleous & Co. That firm developed business links with Russia and Eastern Europe. The firm's Limassol office houses the Honorary Consulate of Portugal in Cyprus. Elias Neocleous & Co. LLC was ranked as the leading firm in Cyprus by Legal 500.
