= Democratic National Party (Cyprus) =

Democratic National Party Δημοκρατικό Εθνικό Kόμμα
- Founder: Takis Evdokas
- Founded: May 1968
- Dissolved: 1977
- Split from: Patriotic Front
- Succeeded by: Democratic Rally
- Headquarters: Nicosia, Cyprus
- Ideology: Greek nationalism Enosis
- Political position: Far-right

The Democratic National Party (Greek: Δημοκρατικό Εθνικό Κόμμα, ΔΕΚ, DEK) was a far-right nationalist political party in Cyprus that advocated the union of Cyprus and Greece (Enosis).

The Democratic National Party was founded in May 1968 by Takis Evdokas and participated 1970 and 1976 elections in Cyprus. The DEK was merged to Democratic Rally (DISY) in 1977.
