= Nikos Sampson =

Greek-Cypriot militant, politician and acting president (1935–2001)

- Νίκος Σαμψών

De facto President of Cyprus Acting
- In office 15 July 1974 – 23 July 1974
- Preceded by: Makarios III
- Succeeded by: Glafcos Clerides (acting)

Member of the Cypriot House of Representatives
- In office 1970–1974

Personal details
- Born: Nikolaos (Nikos) Georgiadis (Νικόλαος Γεωργιάδης); 16 December 1935 Famagusta, British Cyprus (present-day Cyprus) (Note: Claimed by Northern Cyprus, which is only recognised by Turkey; see Cyprus Problem)
- Died: 9 May 2001 (aged 65) Nicosia, Cyprus
- Party: Progressive Party (1969–1970); Progressive Front (1970–1974)
- Spouse: Veronica Sampson
- Children: 2 including Sotirios Sampson
- Occupation: Politician

Military service
- Allegiance: Kingdom of Greece
- Branch/service: EOKA
- Battles/wars: Cyprus Emergency; Cypriot intercommunal violence

Nikos Sampson (Greek: Νίκος Σαμψών; born Nikolaos (Nikos) Georgiadis, Νίκολαος (Νίκος) Γεωργιάδης; 16 December 1935 – 9 May 2001) was a Greek-Cypriot journalist, militant and politician, who was installed as acting President of Cyprus during the 1974 coup.

A former journalist and EOKA militant pardoned under the London and Zürich Agreements, Sampson was first elected Member of the House of Representatives in 1960 on a platform of Enosis (unification with Greece). As a prominent supporter of the 1974 coup, he was installed by its leaders as the island’s President. However, the Turkish invasion of Cyprus forced him to step down eight days later. Following the return of the legitimate government to power, Turkish troops refused to leave, causing the division of Cyprus. Sampson was sentenced to twenty years in prison for his role as the political leader of the coup (although for 13 years of the sentence he was granted medical leave). Convicted specifically of abuse of power, he is the only person to have been held criminally liable for the events. Following his release in the mid-1990s, Sampson returned to the media industry.

== Early life ==
Sampson was born in the Cypriot port city of Famagusta to Greek Cypriot parents Sampson Georgiadis and Theano Liasidou. During his teenage years, he was a footballer, playing as a right back in the Anorthosis Famagusta second team. He began his working life at a Cyprus newspaper, The Cyprus Times, which was owned and edited by Charles Foley. His original name was "Nikos Georgiadis", but he adopted his father's forename (Sampson) as his surname.

== Militant activities ==
During the Cyprus Emergency, in which the Greek-Cypriot organization EOKA waged a guerrilla campaign against British colonial rule in Cyprus from 1955 to 1959, Sampson joined EOKA and adopted the nom de guerre Atrotos (Greek: Áτρωτος), or "Invulnerable". Sampson joined EOKA and formed part of an execution team under the direct orders of General Georgios Grivas ("Digenis"), leader of EOKA. Another member of this team was Neoptolemos Georgiou who was later arrested for various activities whilst being a member of EOKA-B. Sampson and Georgiou participated in a number of murders carried out along Ledra Street in Nicosia, which was nicknamed "Murder Mile", and shot dead numerous British servicemen and police officers. He was involved in at least 15 killings. According to British sources, the actual number was much higher. Among his victims were three police sergeants, and in May 1957, Sampson was tried for one of their murders. He confessed, but was acquitted on the grounds that his confession may have been coerced by torture.

At the time, Sampson was working as a journalist, and he would often photograph the bodies of his victims after killing them, then send the photographs to The Cyprus Times newspaper to be published. The police became suspicious about how Sampson was always the first reporter to arrive at the murder scene and he was arrested. Only a month after his acquittal, he was given away by informants and arrested in the village of Dhali. He was convicted of weapons possession which, under the emergency regulations in effect at the time, carried a death sentence. The death sentence was subsequently commuted to life imprisonment and Sampson was flown to the United Kingdom to serve it. A year and a half later, under a general amnesty as part of the 1959 Zürich and London Agreement, he was released but he remained in exile in Greece until Cyprus gained formal independence in August 1960. He returned to Nicosia shortly after Independence Day.

== Post-independence ==
Sampson returned to newspaper publishing. In 1960, he set up the newspaper Makhi (Greek: Μάχη), meaning battle, or struggle. In a series of newspaper articles published in 1961, Sampson discussed aspects of his participation in the EOKA campaign against British colonial rule in Cyprus, including skirmishes he participated in against the British colonial police. According to The Daily Telegraph, as a journalist, he flew to Algeria to interview Ben Bella and to Washington, D.C. to talk to U.S. President John F. Kennedy.

On 14 May 1961, he was arrested, along with another man, a garage mechanic who was also a former EOKA member, in connection with the murder of a British architect, Peter Gray, who had been only three weeks in the country and had been shot and killed in Kyrenia in his car. Sampson was charged with the murder, but released three days later. Makhi later printed a claim that Gray was working for the British Secret Intelligence Service. His murder remained unsolved.

Following an explosion to the statue of EOKA hero Markos Drakos in Nicosia, Sampson actively participated in clashes between the Greek and Turkish communities in December 1963. On the morning of 24 December, the clashes in Nicosia spread and fighting continued into the subsequent year. Sampson led armed groups in fierce battles between Greek Cypriot and Turkish Cypriot irregulars. Following the battle in Omorphita, Nikos Sampson was nicknamed by the Turkish Cypriots as the "Butcher of Omorphita".

== 1974 coup ==
In 1969 Sampson founded the Progressive Party, which later merged into the Progressive Front. Sampson was elected to the House of Representatives in the 1970 elections. In 1971, EOKA head George Grivas returned to Cyprus and gave the campaign for enosis further momentum, forming EOKA B whose goal was enosis. Following the death of Grivas in January 1974, the Greek military junta of 1967-1974 gave active support to EOKA-B. Nikos Sampson maintained a strongly nationalist, pro-Greek position throughout these years. On 15 July 1974, Makarios was deposed by a military coup which was led by Greek officers of the Cyprus National Guard.

The Greek military junta installed Sampson as president, as a result of a decision of Colonel Constantinos Kombokis, Deputy leader of the coup, when the President of the Supreme Court could not be found and an ex Makarios minister Zenon Severis refused to take over as president. Sampson's appointment was an on-the-spot decision to avoid a power vacuum. The second Junta of Greece fell on 24 July 1974, only eight days after Sampson had been appointed and four days after Turkish troops invaded. Sampson was forced to resign. The Greek Cypriot government was restored under Glafkos Clerides. When Sampson resigned on 23 July 1974 Turkey was in control of 3% of the territory of Cyprus and the Turkish Cypriot enclaves (around 4-5% of the territory) had almost all fallen in the hands of Greek-Cypriots.

== Imprisonment and later years ==
The invasion lost Sampson much of his popular appeal. He claimed not to have anticipated the impending coup that had installed him, adding that, after military officers had insisted, he "saw the possibility of civil war and accepted" to prevent the clashes. Nonetheless, Sampson was prosecuted and sentenced to 20 years in prison for abuse of power (Greek: νόσφιση εξουσίας) in 1976.

In 1979, only three years into his prison sentence, he was allowed to go to France on medical grounds. Living in Neuilly, and then in Fourqueux, he was supported by funds of friends. He spent much of his time between Paris and Marseille before returning to Cyprus in June 1990 to complete his sentence.

Following his release from Nicosia Central Prison in 1992, he went back to the newspaper publishing business. He died of cancer on 9 May 2001 in Nicosia at the age of 65.

He is survived by his wife Vera and two children, one of whom is a lawyer and the other a journalist. His son Sotiris Sampson was elected member of the House of Representatives of Cyprus for three terms in a row in Famagusta District.

== Legacy ==
Some on the political right in Cyprus refer to Sampson as a hero of the EOKA independence struggle that sought to unify the island with Greece. Meanwhile, many on the political left, while acknowledging his contribution to the EOKA struggle, see him as a traitor to the Republic of Cyprus for his involvement in the coup and complicity in the killings of some liberals and leftists. Some also point out that it was in part his actions that led to the division of the island.

== Bibliography ==
- Cyprus, Paul D. Hellander, 2003 ISBN 1-74059-122-4
- The Cyprus Question and the Turkish Position in International Law, Zaim M. Necatigil, 1993 ISBN 0-19-825846-1
- Η Μεγάλη Ιδέα της Μικρής Χούντας, Makarios Droushiotis, 2010
- H Αλήθεια, Bonanos, 1986
- Απο την Ζυριχη στον Αττιλα, Spyros Papageorgiou, 1980
- Η Κατάθεση Μου, Glafcos Clerides, 1991
- Πόρισμα της Ελληνικής Βουλής για τον Φακελο της Κυπρου, 1988
- Πόρισμα Κυπριακής Βουλής για τον Φακελο της Κυπρου, 2011
- Φάκελος Κύπρου: Τα απόρρητα Ντοκουμέντα, Eleftherotypia, 2010
- 30 Hot Days, by Mehmet Ali Birand
- 1974 – To Agnosto Paraskinio tis Tourkikis Eisvolis – Makarios Droushiotis
- Years of Renewal-Kissinger Henry
- Makarios Speech to the Security Council of the UN – 19 July 1974 – H Tragiki Anametrisi kai i Prodosia tis Kyprou – Marios Adamides – 2012
- Secret Minutes of the Conversation of Makarios with the Prime Minister of the U.K Wilson – 17 July 1974 – H Tragiki Anametrisi kai i Prodosia tis Kyprou-Marios Adamides – 2012
- Secret Minutes of the Conversation of the Prime Minister of Turkey Ecevit with the Prime Minister of the U.K Wilson – 17 July 1974 – H Tragiki Anametrisi kai i Prodosia tis Kyprou – Marios Adamides – 2012
- The Tragic Duel and the Betrayal of Cyprus-H Tragiki Anametrisi kai i Prodosia tis Kyprou-Marios Adamides-2011-Library of Congress, Washington- Shelf Location FLS2015 186850 CALL NUMBER DS54.9 .A345 2011 OVERFLOWJ34 Request in Jefferson or Adams Building Reading Rooms (FLS2)
