= 1970 Cypriot legislative election =

- 5 July 1970

35 of 50 seats in the House of Representatives
- Turnout: 75.85% (▲1.68pp)
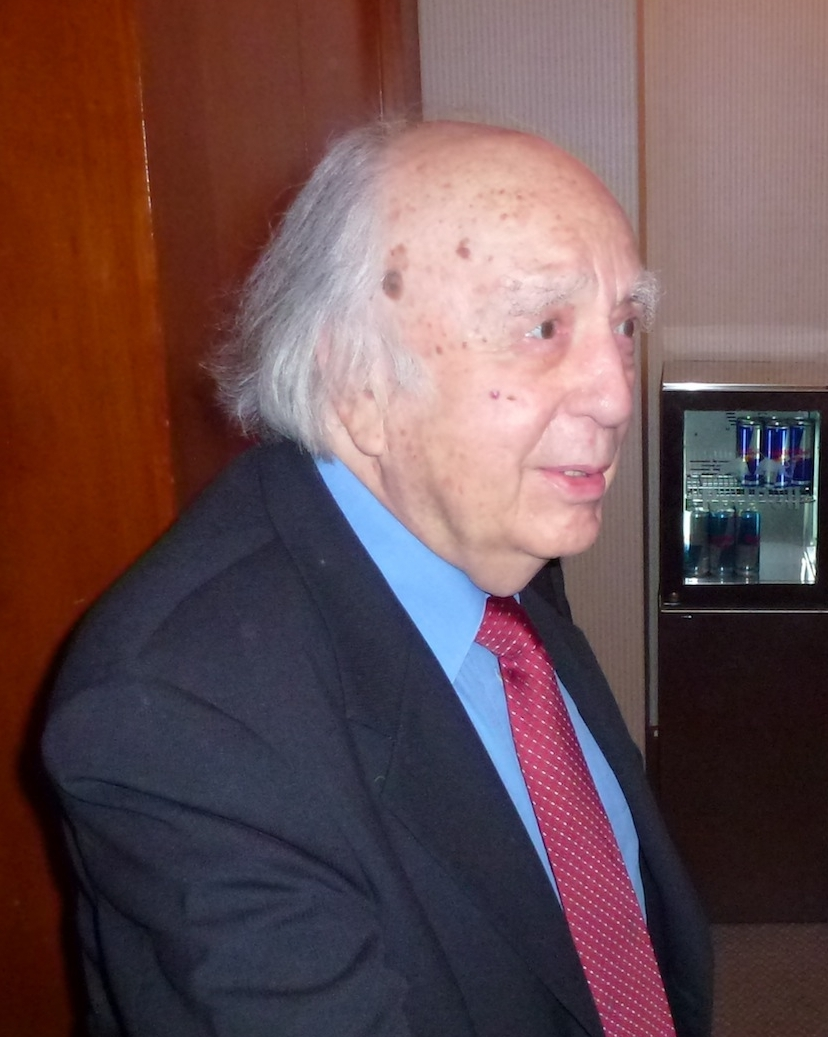
| | First party | Second party | Third party |
|---|---|---|---|
| | AKEL | | PM |
| Leader | Ezekias Papaioannou | Glafkos Clerides | Odysseus Ioannidis |
| Party | AKEL | Eniaion | Progressive Front |
| Last election | 5 seats, 37.71% | New | New |
| Seats won | 9 | 15 | 7 |
| Seat change | ▲4 | New | New |
| Popular vote | 79,666 | 51,082 | 35,783 |
| Percentage | 35.67% | 22.87% | 16.02 |
| Swing | ▼2.04 pp | New | New |
| | Fourth party | Fifth party |
| | | DEK |
| Leader | Vassos Lyssarides | Takis Evdokas |
| Party | EDEK | DEK |
| Last election | New | New |
| Seats won | 2 | 0 |
| Seat change | New | New |
| Popular vote | 26,908 | 19,655 |
| Percentage | 12.05% | 8.80% |
| Swing | New | New |
- Results by constituency.
President of the House of Representatives before election
Glafcos Clerides
Elected President of the House of Representatives
Glafcos Clerides

Parliamentary elections were held in Cyprus on 5 July 1970. Out of the 50 available seats, 35 were filled through elections within the Greek community, while the remaining 15 were designated for the Turkish community. The Turkish community did not take part in this particular election. The result was a victory for Eniaion, which won 15 of the 35 seats despite AKEL receiving a far larger share of the vote.

== Results ==
| Party | Votes | % | Seats | +/– |
|---|---|---|---|---|
| Progressive Party of Working People | 79,666 | 35.67 | 9 | +4 |
| Eniaion | 51,082 | 22.87 | 15 | New |
| Progressive Front | 35,783 | 16.02 | 7 | New |
| Movement for Social Democracy | 26,908 | 12.05 | 2 | New |
| Democratic National Party | 19,655 | 8.80 | 0 | New |
| Independents | 10,256 | 4.59 | 2 | +2 |
| Vacant | | | 15 | – |
| Total | 223,350 | 100.00 | 50 | 0 |
| Valid votes | 195,737 | 97.80 | | |
| Invalid/blank votes | 4,404 | 2.20 | | |
| Total votes | 200,141 | 100.00 | | |
| Registered voters/turnout | 263,875 | 75.85 | | |
Source: IPU
