= Charles Foley (journalist) =

British journalist

Charles Foley (1908–1995) was an Indian-born British journalist.

== Biography ==
Charles Maurice Foley was born in India on 29 November 1908. His father, Maurice, a civil engineer, was based in Bengal at the time. Foley began working as a journalist in Paris on the Paris Herald, a European edition of the New York Herald, later known as the International Herald Tribune. From 1940 to 1955 he served as foreign editor on the British newspaper The Daily Express. In 1954 he interviewed Hitler's former commando chief, Otto Skorzeny – then living in Madrid. Foley subsequently wrote Commando Extraordinary, Otto Skorzeny (Longman Green, London, 1954), a well-crafted but laudatory account of Skorzeny's war-time exploits.

In 1955 Foley moved to Cyprus and took over Times of Cyprus newspaper at a moment in the island's history when a civil war was breaking out between Greek and Turkish Cypriots, and the Greek Cypriot EOKA movement was starting an armed struggle against the British colonial government in Cyprus. He later published a number of books on Cyprus.

- Island in Revolt (London: Longmans, 1962)
- Cyprus: Legacy of Strife (London: Penguin Books, 1962)
- The Struggle for Cyprus [together with W. I. Scobie] (Stanford, Calif.: Hoover Institution Press, 1975).

He also published The Memoirs of General Grivas (London: Longmans, 1964), approved by the military leader of EOKA, Georgios Grivas.

Between 1960 and 1977 he was a correspondent for the London Observer, and was based in Los Angeles, California.

He died on 30 May 1995, at Vence, Alpes Maritimes, France.
