= Andreas Neocleous & Co =

Law firm in Cyprus

- Headquarters: Limassol, Cyprus
- No. of offices: 9
- No. of lawyers: 130
- Major practice areas: Full-service firm
- Date founded: 1965 (Limassol)
- Company type: LLC
- Website: www.neocleous.com

Andreas Neocleous & Co LLC was a Cypriot law firm. It was the only Cyprus firm to appear in Legal Business's "Euro Elite" listing of the 100 most influential law firms in Europe and in the list of 100 largest law firms in Europe, published by The Lawyer. It was founded in Limassol in 1965 by Andreas Neocleous and also had offices in Nicosia and Paphos in Cyprus, and in Brussels, Kyiv, Prague, Budapest in mainland Europe, and a number of non-exclusive arrangements with other overseas firms in specialist sectors, such as energy.

The firm specialised in serving international businesses and organisations. Its main spheres of activity were cross-border investment and finance, shipping and large-scale commercial litigation. Andreas Neocleous & Co was ranked as the leading firm in Cyprus by Legal 500, PLC Which Lawyer, Chambers Guides and IFLR 1000. The firm's Limassol office housed the Honorary Consulates of Japan and Portugal in Cyprus.

The firm was an active proponent of the benefits of licensed software. It was widely consulted by the international press for comment and opinion regarding the Cyprus economic situation.

== Bribery conviction ==
On February 8, 2017, former deputy attorney-general Rikkos Erotokritou, lawyers Andreas Kyprizoglou and Panayiotis Neocleous, and the Andreas Neocleous & Co LLC law firm were found guilty by the Nicosia criminal court. Panayiotis Neocleous and the Neocleous law firm were found guilty of bribery, conspiracy, and corruption. The four were said to have colluded to arrange for Erotokritou to launch the criminal prosecution of five Russian individuals and one company, at the behest and to the benefit of the Neocleous law firm, which had long been battling them in Cypriot and Russian courts over ownership and control of Providencia, a trust-fund worth hundreds of millions.
