= Cyprus Weekly =

English-language newspaper

- Type: Weekly newspaper
- Owner: CYWEEKLY LTD
- Editor: Lefteris Adilinis
- Founded: 1979
- Political alignment: Independent
- Headquarters: Nicosia, Cyprus
- Website: www.in-cyprus.com

The Cyprus Weekly was the top-selling English-language newspaper in Cyprus, with a circulation exceeding 14,000 copies. It was published every Friday. The Editor in Chief was Lefteris Adilinis. The Managing Editor was Charlie Charalambous while the sports editor was John Leonidou. The photographer was Stefanos Kouratzis.

The paper printed its last paper in September 2017. It is an online news only company now. The last news story to be added to its online site was on 25 September 2017.

== Foundation and political allegiance ==
The Cyprus Weekly stated itself to be without any political affiliations. It was founded in 1979 by former Times of Cyprus journalist Georges der Parthogh (1920-2008) as an independent publication although it later became part of the Phileleftheros news group, which also publishes the politically liberal Greek language Cypriot daily newspaper, Phileleftheros.

The Editor in Chief is Lefteris Adilinis. The Managing Editor is Charlie Charalambous while the sports editor is John Leonidou. The photographer is Stefanos Kouratzis.

== Newspaper content ==
The Cyprus Weekly features news items from Cyprus and around the world from throughout the week and includes an arts and lifestyle section. It also has special pages dedicated to news from each of the local towns under the control of the Republic of Cyprus, pages dedicated to news from Greece, Turkey and the Middle East, and the week's local television listings.

== Cyprus Daily ==
In 2013, The Cyprus Weekly launched a twin newspaper called The Cyprus Daily which was published from Monday and Friday, with the publication day of the weekly edition moved to Saturdays. However, publication of the daily edition ceased the same year and the Cyprus Weekly returned to being published on Fridays.

== Regular reporters ==
The newspaper's regular reporters included John Leonidou, Annie Charalambous, Athena Karsera, and George Philis.

== Unusual stories ==
Unusual stories include the April Fool's Day hoax on 1 April 2014 suggesting that students studying in a class at the Cyprus College of Art were seen running screaming from the college building after seeing a ghost, and the true suggestion that Cyprus should abandon its long-standing national cocktail, the brandy sour in favour of a new cocktail called the Ouzini.

== See also ==
- List of newspapers in Cyprus
