= China International Fair for Investment and Trade =

CIFIT
- Status: Active
- Genre: Investment Fair
- Venue: Xiamen International Conference and Exhibition Center
- Locations: Xiamen, Fujian
- Country: China
- Inaugurated: 1997
- Most recent: 2012
- Attendance: 114,000
- Organizer: MOFCOM
- Website: www.chinafair.org.cn

The China International Fair for Investment and Trade (CIFIT, simplified Chinese: 中国国际投资贸易洽谈会; traditional Chinese: 中國國際投資貿易洽談會), approved by the State Council of the People's Republic of China, takes place on September every year in Xiamen, China. Themed on Introducing FDI and Going Global, CIFIT features a focus upon nationality and internationality, upon investment negotiation and investment policy promotion, upon coordinated development of national and regional economy, and upon economic and trade exchanges across the Taiwan Strait. CIFIT is currently China's only international investment promotion event aimed at facilitating bilateral investment. It's also the largest global investment event approved by UFI.

== Location ==
The trade show is held annually on September 8–11 in the southern coastal city of Xiamen, Fujian on mainland China.

== Major events ==
Major events of the 16th CIFIT (2012)

September 6: Press conference

September 7: Welcoming banquet and welcoming cocktail party

September 8:International investment forum (by invitation)

September 7–11: Series of forums and seminars

September 7–11: Matchmaking Symposia on investment projects

09:08-9:45 September 8: Opening ceremony (by invitation)

September 8–11: Exhibition

== Themes ==
"Introducing FDI": Showcase China's investment environment, image, policies and business opportunities to promote foreign investment in China.

"Going Global": Showcase investment environment, image, policies and business opportunities of all over the world, guide Chinese enterprises to invest overseas in a positive manner.

== History of CIFIT ==
CIFIT started out as the Fujian Fair for International Investment & Trade (FFIIT). It was held for the ten years between 1987 and 1996. Then came the Ministry of Foreign Trade and Economic Cooperation (Moftec) of the People's Republic of China who saw the opportunity to expand this trade show to include marketing the rest of China for foreign direct investment. Consequently, the FFIIT was promoted officially to CIFIT in January 1997.

== See also ==
- Ministry of Commerce of the People's Republic of China (MOFCOM)
- Special Economic Zone of the People's Republic of China
- Economy of China
- People's Republic of China
- List of China-related topics
