= Cyprus State Fairs Authority =

The Cyprus State Fairs Authority (CSFA) was established in 1968 as a semi-government organisation in order to run and promote the annual Cyprus International Fair. It has since expanded and runs several annual and biannual events such as the education fair, and the Cyprus motor show.

The largest event the Cyprus International Fair was first held in 1975. Since then it has steadily grown and in currently has around 130,000 visitors. In 2007 the CSFA announced a decision to rename the event to Expo-Cyprus.

The grounds of the state fair moved to their current location in the Nicosia suburb of Makedonitissa in the early 1970s and have undergone several phases of expansion since. Currently they cover an area of 30,000m^{2} of indoor space and 100,000m^{2} of outdoor grounds. Apart from hosting exhibitions the grounds have at times been used for other purposes such as music concerts, large rave parties even as a service station for the Cyprus arm of the Middle East Rally. In 2006 the American Embassy to Cyprus was allowed to use two large exhibition halls as temporary accommodation to house the thousands of American citizens evacuated from the war in Lebanon.

The CSFA is a member of the Global Association of the Exhibition Industry and the International Congress and Convention Association.
