= 1976 Cypriot legislative election =

Parliamentary election in Cyprus

Parliamentary elections were held in Cyprus on 5 September 1976. The elections were contested by two alliances; one consisting of the Democratic Front (DIKO), the Progressive Party of Working People (AKEL) and the Movement for Social Democracy (EDEK) and one consisting of the Democratic National Party (DEK) and Democratic Rally (DISY).

The DIKO–AKEL–EDEK alliance received just over 70% of the vote and won 34 of the 35 seats, with the remaining seat going to an independent (Tassos Papadopoulos). Within the alliance, DIKO took 21 seats, AKEL nine and EDEK four. Voter turnout was 85.3%.

== Results ==
Party or alliance		Votes	%	Seats	+/–
DIKO–AKEL–EDEK	DIKO	756,251	43.75	21	new
DIKO–AKEL–EDEK	AKEL	264,005	15.27	9	0
DIKO–AKEL–EDEK	EDEK	172,485	9.98	4	+2
DIKO–AKEL–EDEK	Other	49,735	2.88	0	–
DIKO–AKEL–EDEK	Total	1,242,476	71.89	34	new
DEK–DISY		485,332	28.08	0	0
Independents		583	0.03	1	–1
Total		1,728,391	100.00	35	0
Valid votes		229,223	98.48		
Invalid/blank votes		3,541	1.52		
Total votes		232,764	100.00		
Registered voters/turnout		272,898	85.29		
Source: Parliament
