= Eniaion =

United Party Eniaion
- Leader: Glafcos Clerides
- Founded: 1969
- Dissolved: 1976
- Split from: Patriotic Front
- Succeeded by: DIKO; DISY
- Headquarters: Nicosia, Cyprus

The United Party (Greek: Ενιαίον Κόμμα), known in Greek simply as Eniaion ("United"), was a short-lived political party in Cyprus.

== History ==
The party was established by Glafcos Clerides in February 1969 as a split from the Patriotic Front.

In the 1970 parliamentary elections the party emerged as the largest in the House of Representatives with 15 seats, despite finishing second in the vote tally.

The party did not contest any further elections, with Clerides going on to establish the pro-Western Democratic Rally prior to the 1976 elections and Spyros Kyprianou going on to establish the more pro-Makarios, moderate nationalist Democratic Party.

== Elected MPs ==
Seat	Elected members
Nicosia	Glafkos Klerides
Nicosia	Tassos Papadopoulos
Nicosia	Mixalakis Savvidis
Nicosia	Nikos Koshis
Nicosia	Ksanthos Klirides
Nicosia	Leandros Zaxariadis
Nicosia	Panagiotis Demetriou
Nicosia	Georgios Zambas
Nicosia	Andreas Xatzioannou
Limassol	Aimilios Michailides
Limassol	Aimilios Fragkos
Limassol	Xenis Xenopoulos
Limassol	Andreas Neocleous
Limassol	Maliotis Georgios
Larnaca	Antonakis Sotiriadis
