= Takis Evdokas =

Cypriot politician (1928–2020)

Takis Evdokas Τάκης Ευδόκας
- Born: 19 June 1928; Pachna, Limassol, Cyprus
- Died: 12 February 2020 (aged 91)
- Occupations: Politician; psychiatrist; writer
- Political party: Democratic National Party
- Children: Andreas; Peter

Takis Evdokas (Greek: Τάκης Ευδόκας; 19 June 1928 – 12 February 2020) was a Greek Cypriot politician, psychiatrist and writer. He was the founder of the Democratic National Party which advocated the union of Cyprus and Greece (Enosis).
