= 1974 Cypriot coup d'état =

Greek military coup d'état in Cyprus

- Part of the Cyprus problem
Date	15 July 1974
Location	Cyprus
Result	Coup successful: Establishment of the Cypriot Junta.; President Makarios III flees and coup leaders take charge.; First Turkish invasion of Cyprus occupies 3% of the island followed by an uprising, forcing coup leaders to step down.; Collapse of the Coup Government on 23 July following protests, internal pressure and an uprising.; Second Turkish invasion of Cyprus occupies 36.2% of Cyprus. Turkish occupation of northern Cyprus begins.

Belligerents
Government of Cyprus: Cypriot National Guard (factions loyal to Makarios); Efedriko; Pro-government militias: Movement for Social Democracy; Eniaion; Progressive Party of Working People	(Cyprus) Pro-Enosis rebels: Cypriot National Guard (rebel factions); EOKA-B; Progressive Front; Supported by: Greece

Commanders and leaders
(Cyprus) Makarios III (Cyprus) Vassos Lyssarides (Cyprus) Pantelakis Pantatzis	Brigadier General Michalis Georgitsis; Colonel Konstantinos Kombokis; Athanasios Sklavenitis (Cyprus) Nikos Sampson

Casualties and losses
1,617 Cypriots missing, 300 civilians among them killed	Andreas Kestas – 20 years old, member of the Special Reserve Force, from Limassol. Haralambos Kirillou – 19 years old, member of the Special Reserve Force, from Chloraka. Nikos Solomou – 21 years old, member of the Special Reserve Force, from Pachyammos. Philipos Kritiotis – 20 years old, National Guard, from Stato-Agios Fotios.

A military coup d'état was executed by the Cypriot National Guard on 15 July 1974 with Greek support. The coup plotters removed the sitting President of Cyprus, Archbishop Makarios III, from office and installed pro-Enosis nationalist Nikos Sampson. The Sampson regime was described as a puppet state, whose ultimate aim was the annexation of the island by Greece; in the short term, the coupists proclaimed the establishment of the "Hellenic Republic of Cyprus". The coup was viewed as illegal by the United Nations and led immediately to the Turkish invasion and formation of Northern Cyprus as part of the Republic of Cyprus.

== Background ==
The Republic of Cyprus was established in 1960 with the London and Zurich Agreements, and the Greek Cypriots and Turkish Cypriots were the two founding communities. However, following constitutional amendments that were proposed by Makarios III and rejected by Turkish Cypriots, intercommunal violence erupted throughout the island, the Turkish Cypriot representation in the government ended partially due to forced prevention and partially due to willing withdrawal, and Turkish Cypriots started living in enclaves.

Greece had established a national policy of enosis to achieve the island's union with Greece since the 1950s. After 1964, the Greek government tried to control Makarios' policies, and following his unwillingness to obey Athens, attempted to destabilize his government. While the Greek policy shifted to a more cooperative one after 1967, when an extremist military junta took power in Greece, it supported the far-right EOKA-B group against Makarios. Dimitrios Ioannidis, the de facto leader of the junta, believed that Makarios was no longer a true supporter of enosis, and suspected him of being a communist sympathizer. Between 1971 and 1974, five plans were prepared by the Greek government to overthrow Makarios' government.

== The coup ==
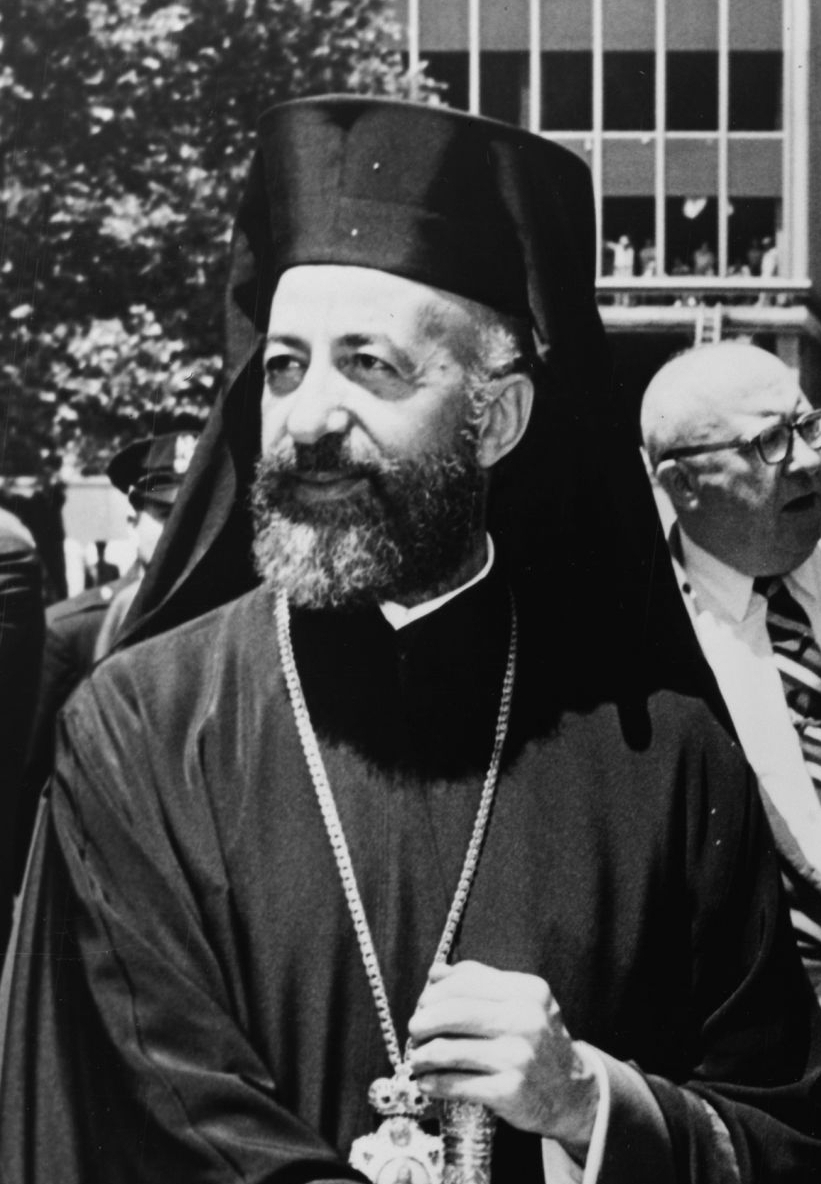
Makarios, the deposed President

The coup was ordered by Dimitrios Ioannidis, the shadow leader of the Greek junta, and Greek officers led the Cypriot National Guard to capture the Presidential Palace in Nicosia. The building was almost entirely burned down. Makarios narrowly escaped death in the attack owing to the efforts of his presidential guard, Haralambos Kirillou a then 19 years old, member of the Special Reserve Force, from Chloraka and Nikos Solomou, a 21 years old, member of the Special Reserve Force, from Pachyammos who took part in an operation to rescue Makarios on 15 July 1974. Owing to this operation, he fled the presidential palace from its back door and went to Paphos, where the British managed to retrieve him in the afternoon of 16 July and flew him from Akrotiri to Malta in a Royal Air Force transport plane, and from there to London the next morning. On 19 July, he attended a United Nations Security Council meeting in New York and gave a speech, in which he stated that Cyprus had been invaded by Greece.

The newly established regime has been described as an extremist puppet regime of the Greek junta. On 15 July, between 8 am and 9 am, the coup leaders proclaimed their victory on the state channel Cyprus Broadcasting Corporation, saying "The national guard intervened in order to solve the problematical situation. [...]. Makarios is dead." However, before his flight, Makarios announced that he was alive from a private broadcast in Paphos. The new government heavily censored the press and stopped left-wing newspapers being printed. Only right-wing newspapers Machi, Ethniki and Agon continued publishing, and their style was very propagandistic. Sampson did not openly announce his intention of enosis in the days following the coup, but instead focused on suppressing any support for Makarios and heavy propaganda to vilify his government.

In response, Rauf Denktaş, the leader of the Turkish Cypriots, stated that he believed that the events were among Greek Cypriots and called for Turkish Cypriots not to go out, as well as for UNFICYP to take extensive security measures for Turkish Cypriots. The Cypriot National Guard made no attempts to enter the Turkish Cypriot enclaves, but raided Greek and Turkish Cypriot homes alike in mixed villages to confiscate weapons. The Turkish government brought claims that ammunition was being carried to Cyprus by Olympic Air to the attention of UNFICYP. Whether the Turkish Cypriots suffered as a direct result of the coup remains controversial, but Sampson was seen as an untrustworthy figure due to his pro-enosis policies and brutal role against Turkish Cypriots in 1963.

Following the coup, the newly established junta started a crackdown on Makarios supporters, resulting in a number of deaths and a "significant number", according to Frank Hoffmeister, being detained. The number of deaths from the coup remains a disputed issue, as the Republic of Cyprus lists the deaths due to the coup among the missing due to the Turkish invasion. According to Haralambos Athanasopulos, at least 500 Greek Cypriots have been placed on the list of 1617 Greek Cypriot missing people and their deaths blamed on the Turks and Turkish Cypriots. According to Milliyet on 19 July 1974, violent clashes had broken out in Paphos, and even excluding Paphos, the death toll due to Greek Cypriot infighting was about 300 civilians and 30 Greek soldiers, whose bodies were brought to Athens.

=== Public statement by Makarios ===
Archbishop Makarios III, overthrown by the Greek junta in the 1974 coup, opposed immediate Enosis (union between Cyprus and Greece). Makarios described the coup which replaced him as "an invasion of Cyprus by Greece" in his speech to the UN Security Council and stated that there were "no prospects" of success in the talks aimed at resolving the situation between Greek and Turkish Cypriots, as long as the leaders of the coup, sponsored and supported by Greece, were in power.

== Aftermath ==
In response to the coup, on 20 July 1974 Turkey invaded the island saying that the action was compliant with the 1960 Treaty of Guarantee. Sampson resigned, the military regime that had appointed him collapsed, and Makarios returned.

After the coup fell, Turkey invaded the island again and took control of the north and divided Cyprus along what became known as the Green Line, cutting off about a third of the total territory. The Turkish Cypriots established an independent government for what they called the Turkish Federated State of Cyprus (TFSC), with Rauf Denktaş as president. In 1983 they would proclaim the Turkish Republic of Northern Cyprus on the northern part of the island, which remains a de facto puppet state.

== See also ==
- United Nations Buffer Zone in Cyprus
- Rodger Davies
- Republic of Cyprus
- Turkish Republic of Northern Cyprus
