= Makarios III =

Greek Cypriot prelate and politician (1913–1977)

His Beatitude Makarios III
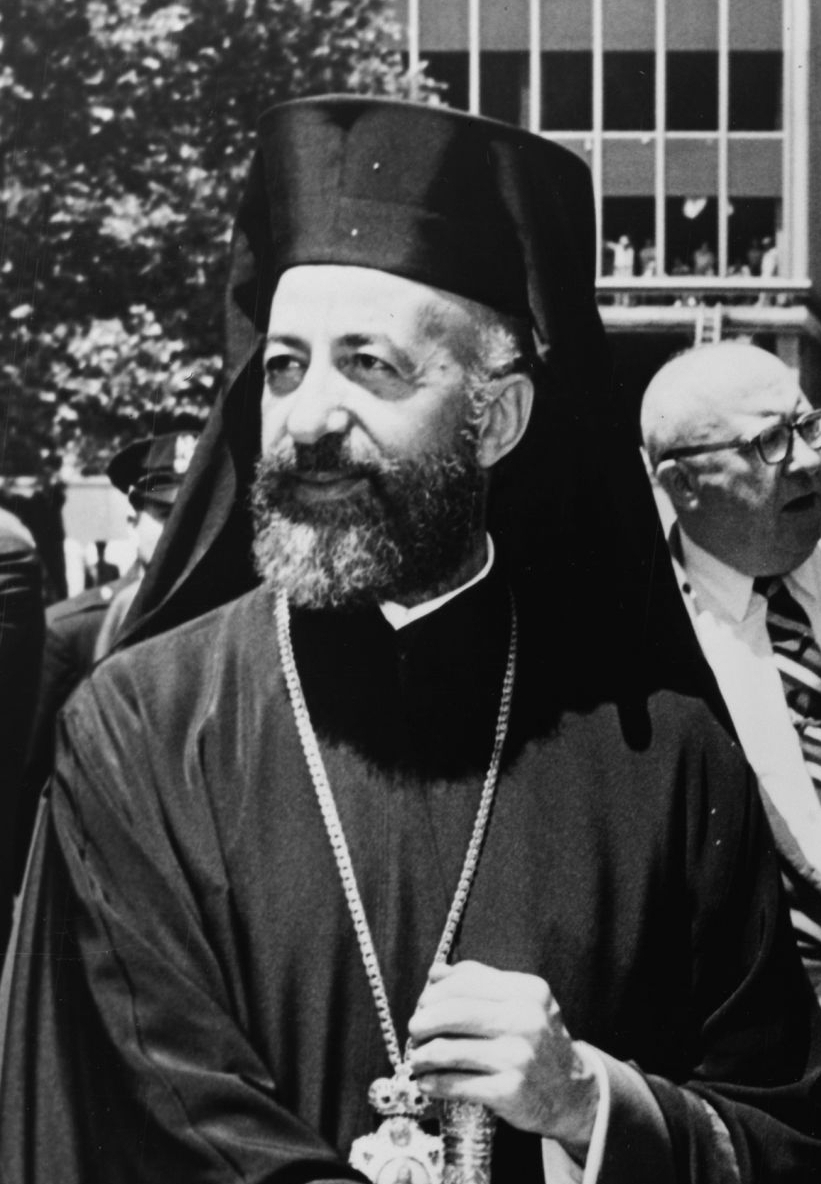
- Makarios in 1962

1st President of Cyprus
- In office 7 December 1974 – 3 August 1977
- Vice President: Vacant
- Preceded by: Glafcos Clerides (acting)
- Succeeded by: Spyros Kyprianou
- In office 16 August 1960 – 15 July 1974
- Vice President: Fazıl Küçük (1959–1973); Rauf Denktaş (1973–1974)
- Preceded by: Office Established
- Succeeded by: Nikos Sampson (de facto, acting)
- Archbishop of Nova Justiniana and All Cyprus
- Church: Church of Cyprus
- Diocese: Cyprus
- Installed: 18 September 1950
- Term ended: 3 August 1977
- Predecessor: Makarios II
- Successor: Chrysostomos I

Personal details
- Born: Michael Christodoulou Mouskos; 13 August 1913 Pano Panayia, Ottoman Cyprus
- Died: 3 August 1977 (aged 63) Nicosia, Cyprus
- Buried: Mount Throni, Kykkos Monastery, Cyprus
- Profession: Clergyman, Politician
- Education: University of Athens; Boston University
- Signature: Makarios III's signature

Makarios III (Note: Greek: Μακάριος Γ΄) (born Michael Christodoulou Mouskos; (Note: Greek: Μιχαήλ Χριστοδούλου Μούσκος) 13 August 1913 – 3 August 1977) was a Greek Cypriot prelate and politician who served as Archbishop of the Church of Cyprus from 1950 to 1977 and as the first president of Cyprus between 1960 and July 1974, with a second term between December 1974 and 1977. He is widely regarded as the founding father or "Ethnarch" of the Republic of Cyprus, leading its transition from British colonial rule.

== Early life, studies and Church career (1913–1950) ==
Michael Christodoulou Mouskos was born in Panayia village in the Paphos District of Cyprus, which was then part of the British Protectorate. In 1926, aged 13, he was admitted to Kykkos Monastery as a novice. At age 20 he was sent to the Pancyprian Gymnasium in Nicosia where he completed his secondary education in 1936. He studied theology and law at the University of Athens during World War II, graduating in 1942. He took up the duties of a priest in the Cypriot Orthodox Church while sustaining an interest in academic theology; he received a World Council of Churches scholarship to undertake further study at Boston University in Massachusetts.

In 1948, while still studying at Boston, he was elected Bishop of Kition against his will. Mouskos adopted, as his clerical name, an old Greek given name Makários (Μακάριος) meaning "happy, fortunate, blessed". He then returned to Cyprus. Like many public figures in the Greek Cypriot community in Cyprus in the 1940s and 1950s, he was an active supporter of enosis, the union of Cyprus with the Kingdom of Greece.

== Enosis and EOKA (1950–1955) ==
On 18 September 1950, Makarios, 37 years old, was elected Archbishop of Cyprus. In this role he was not only the official head of the Orthodox Church in Cyprus, but became the Ethnarch, de facto national leader of Cypriots. This highly influential position put Makarios at the centre of Cypriot politics.

During the 1950s, Makarios embraced his dual role as Archbishop and Ethnarch with enthusiasm and became a very popular figure among Greek Cypriots. He soon became a leading advocate for enosis (the unification of Cyprus with Greece), and during the early part of the decade he maintained close links with the Greek government. In August 1954, partly at Makarios' instigation, Greece began to raise the question of Cyprus at the United Nations, arguing for the principle of self-determination to be applied to Cyprus. This was viewed by advocates of enosis as likely to result in the voluntary union of Cyprus with Greece following a public referendum.

However, the British government was reluctant to decolonise the island which had become their new headquarters for the Middle East. In 1955, a pro-enosis organization was formed under the banner of Ethniki Organosis Kyprion Agoniston (National Organization of Cypriot Fighters), or EOKA. This was a typical independence movement of the period. Makarios undoubtedly had common political ground with EOKA and was acquainted with its leader, the Greek-Cypriot soldier and politician George Grivas, but the extent of his involvement is unclear and disputed. In later life he categorically denied any involvement in the violent resistance undertaken by EOKA.

== Exile, escalation and Taksim (1955–1960) ==
On 20 August 1955, Greece submitted a petition to the United Nations requesting the application of the principle of self-determination to the people of Cyprus. After that, the colonial government of Cyprus enforced the anti-sedition laws for the purpose of preventing or suppressing demonstrations in favor of union with Greece; but the archbishop defied them and continued demanding self-determination for Cyprus.

In October 1955, with the security situation deteriorating, the British governor, Sir John Harding, opened talks on the island's future. By this stage, Makarios had become closely identified with the insurgency, and talks broke up without any agreement in early 1956. Makarios, vilified in the British press and viewed with suspicion by the British authorities, was abducted by Special Branch officers while attempting to board a flight at Nicosia airport. The joint police/military plan, codenamed Operation Apollo, saw Makarios exiled to Mahe Island in the Seychelles on 9 March 1956, as a 'guest' of Sir William Addis, Governor and Commander-in-Chief of the Seychelles. The Archbishop and his staff were flown to Aden and then on to Mombasa. At the Kenyan port the party were embarked in the East African Shakespearian-class trawler HMEAS Rosalind, escorted by the frigate HMS Loch Fada. The flotilla arrived in Port Victoria on 14 March.

In the latter years of the 1950s, the Turkish Cypriot community first began to float the idea of Taksim or partition, as a counterweight to the Greek ideal of enosis or union. Advocates of Taksim felt that the Turkish Cypriot community would be persecuted in a Greek Cyprus, and that only by keeping part of the island under either British or Turkish sovereignty could the safety of the Turkish Cypriots be guaranteed. In this way the Cyprus dispute became increasingly polarized between two communities with opposing visions of the future of the island.

Makarios was released from exile after a year, although he was still forbidden to return to Cyprus. He went instead to Athens, where he was rapturously received. Basing himself in the Greek capital, he continued to work for enosis. During the following two years he attended the General Assembly of the United Nations where the Cyprus question was discussed; and he worked hard to achieve union with Greece.

Under the premiership of Konstantinos Karamanlis in Greece, the goal of enosis was gradually abandoned in favour of Cypriot independence. Negotiations in 1958 generated the Zurich Agreement as a basis for a deal on independence, and Makarios was invited to London in 1959 to fine-tune the plan. Makarios at first refused to accept the plan. The reversal of his self-determination or enosis stance, and his eventual agreement to sign the conditions for the independence of Cyprus, have been attributed to blackmail on behalf of the Greek and British governments.

A 1965 article in the Western Political Quarterly described the constitution as "wobbly", and attributed the civil conflict of 1963 to this quality.

On 1 March 1959, the archbishop returned to Cyprus to an unprecedented reception in Nicosia, where almost two-thirds of the adult Greek Cypriot population turned out to welcome him. Presidential elections were held on 13 December 1959, in which Makarios defeated his rival, lawyer Ioannis Clerides, father of future president and Makarios ally Glafcos Clerides, receiving two-thirds of the vote. Makarios was to become the political leader of all Cyprus as well as the communal leader of the Greek Cypriots.

== Primacy and presidency (1960–1963) ==
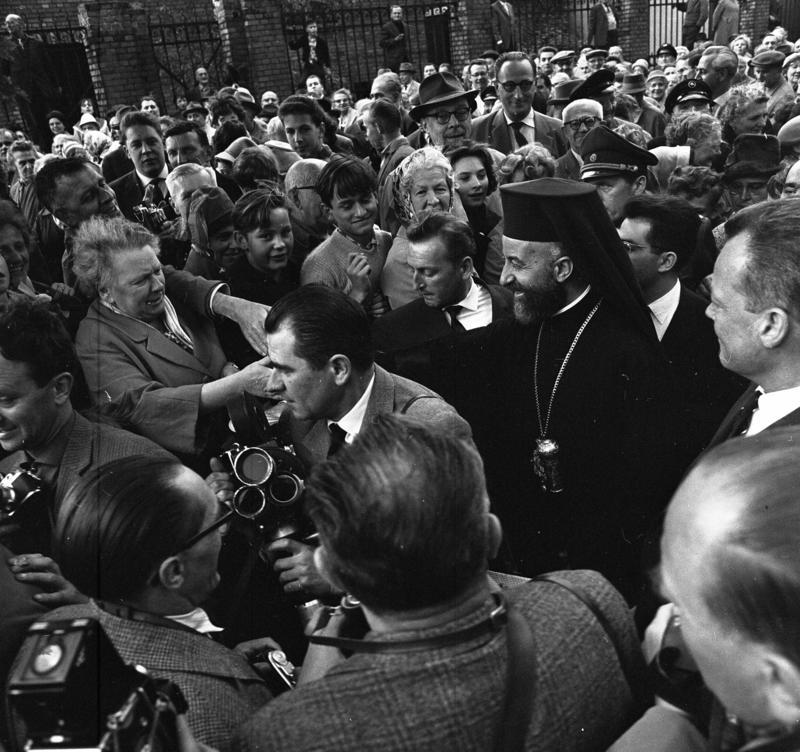
President Makarios during a state visit to West Berlin in 1962

After his election Makarios, together with the vice-president-elect, Fazıl Küçük, continued to draw up plans for Cyprus's future. By now, Makarios had accepted that enosis was not to be, and that the only outcome which could secure harmony in Cyprus was robust independence. Taking office on 16 August 1960, the day the Union Flag was lowered in Nicosia, Makarios moved towards the moderate centre of Cypriot politics and now pursued a policy of non-alignment, cultivating good relations with Turkey as well as Greece and becoming a high-profile member of the Non-Aligned Movement (NAM).

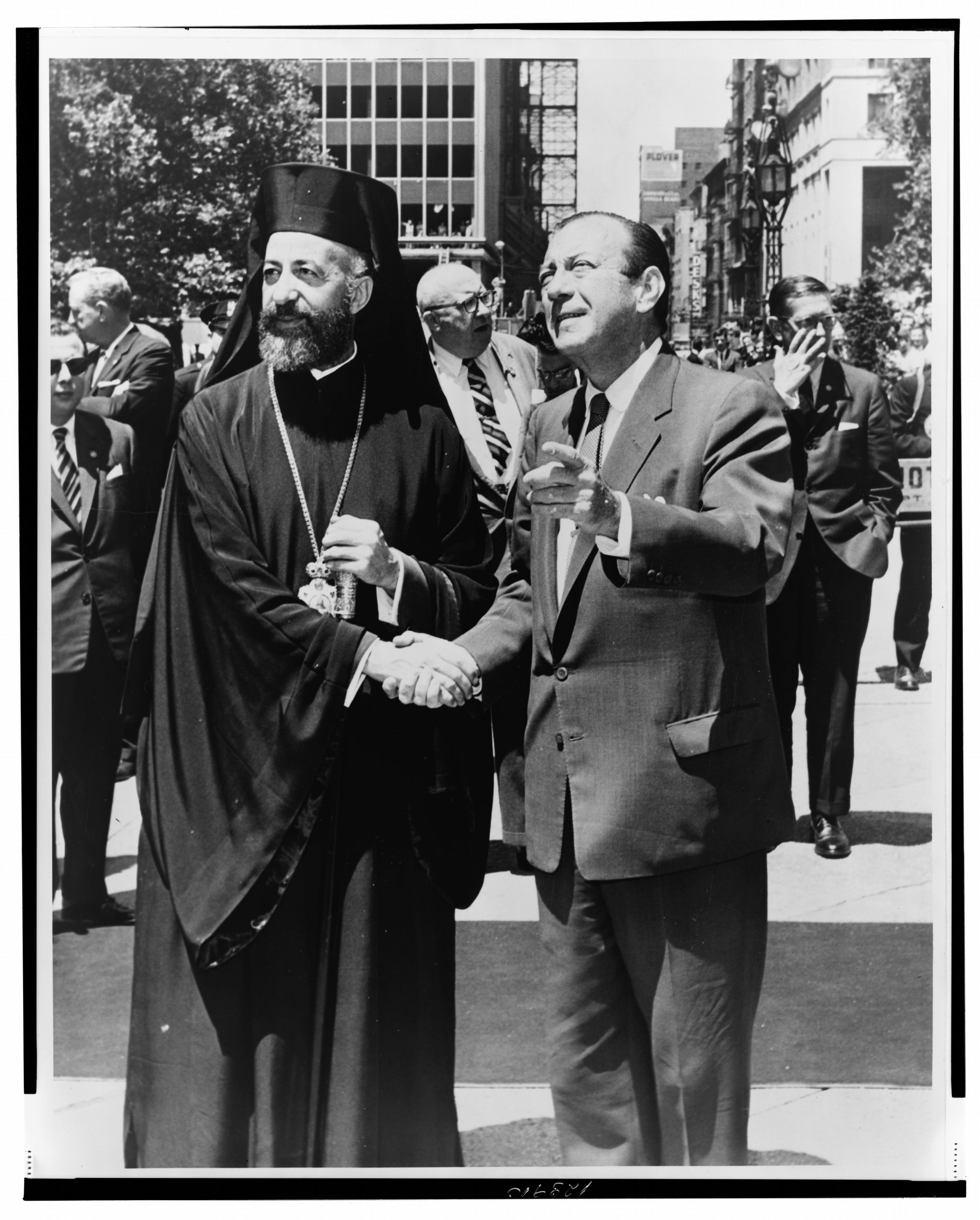
Mayor Robert F. Wagner Jr. greets Archbishop Makarios at New York City Hall

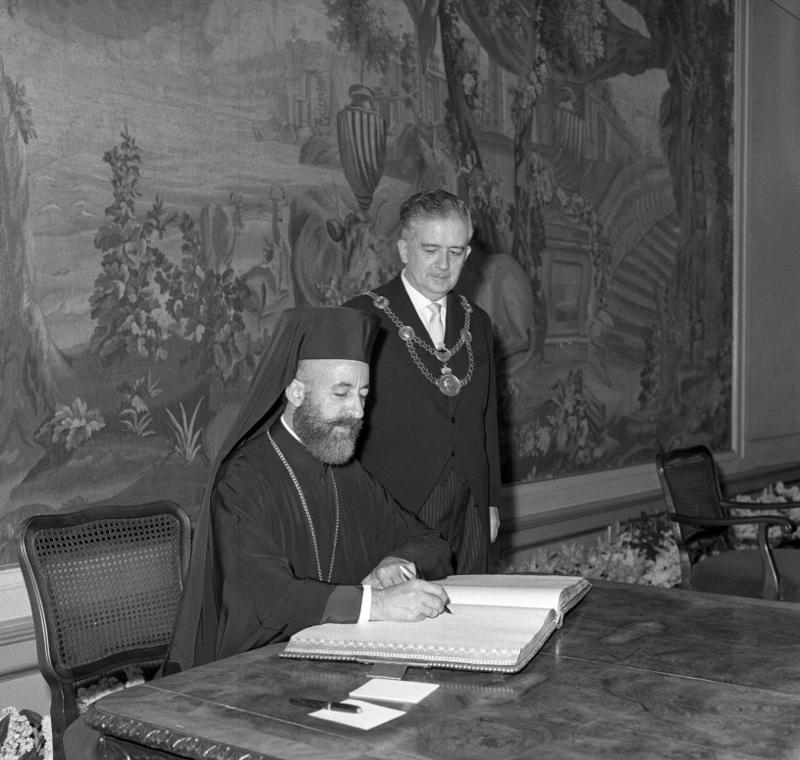
President Makarios in Bonn during a state visit to West Germany in 1962

In March 1961, Cyprus was admitted as a member state of the Commonwealth of Nations and Makarios represented the island at the 1961 Commonwealth Prime Ministers' Conference. He attended the 1st Summit of the Non-Aligned Movement in Belgrade in September 1961, and troubled the governments in London and Washington, D.C. with his lukewarm policy towards the West. During his stay in Belgrade, alongside the conference he also led the liturgical celebration at the St. Michael's Cathedral of the Serbian Orthodox Church. This was seen in the U.S. as demonstrating a tendency towards communism; Makarios was now being vilified in the American press as the "Castro of the Mediterranean" although he had by now been rehabilitated in the British press and was affectionately nicknamed "Black Mak" on account of his clerical garb.

But the idea of an independent path for Cyprus had not taken root among the general public at home. There was increasing acrimony between Turkish and Greek Cypriots about the workings of the constitution, and Makarios was forced to act to salvage the machinery of state from imminent collapse. In November 1963, Makarios proposed thirteen amendments to the Constitution, which would free many public offices from the ethnic restrictions agreed in London and Zurich. This, he argued, would allow the government to operate more efficiently, and bring together the communities by dissolving rigid inter-ethnic legal boundaries. However, the amendments were seen by many Turkish Cypriots as threatening constitutional protections against domination by the majority Greek Cypriots.

In response to Makarios' proposals, most Turkish Cypriots in public office, including Vice-President Küçük, resigned; large numbers of Turkish Cypriots moved out of ethnically mixed areas into villages and towns where the population was already largely Turkish Cypriot. There is still dispute over the motives for this, some arguing that it was made necessary by the intimidation of the Turkish Cypriots by the Greek Cypriots; others suggest that the Turkish community was sabotaging the Cypriot settlement and already preparing for partition by Turkey. By the end of 1963, intercommunal violence had broken out once again.

== Makarios and the Cyprus problem (1964–1977) ==
The political landscape in Cyprus remained intractable. UN peacekeeping operations (UNFICYP) commenced in 1964 and helped to soothe, but not solve, the situation. Makarios continued his high-profile neutrality, but ultimately failed either to reassure the Turkish Cypriots that they were safe in an independent Cyprus, or to convince the Greek Cypriots that independence was a satisfactory alternative to assimilation within a Greater Greece.

President Makarios, seeking a fresh mandate from his constituency, announced in January 1968 that elections would be held during February. Makarios received 220,911 votes (about 96 percent), and his opponent, Takis Evdokas, who ran on a platform for unification with Greece, received 8,577 votes. Even though there were 16,215 abstentions, Makarios' overwhelming victory was seen as a massive endorsement of his personal leadership and of an independent Cyprus. At his investiture, the president stated that the Cyprus problem could not be solved by force, but had to be worked out within the framework of the UN. He also said that he and his followers wanted to live peacefully in a unitary state where all citizens enjoyed equal rights. Some Cypriots opposed Makarios' conciliatory stance (and there was an unsuccessful attempt to assassinate him in 1970).

In 1967, a military junta seized power in Athens, and the relationship between the regime and Makarios was tense. Makarios held that the regime undermined his authority by supporting paramilitary organizations committed to enosis.

During the summer of 1971, tension built up between the two Cypriot communities, and incidents became more numerous. Sometime in the late summer or early autumn, Grivas (who had attacked Makarios as a traitor in an Athens newspaper) returned secretly to the island and began to rebuild his guerrilla organization, which became known as the National Organization of Cypriot Fighters (Ethniki Organosis Kyprion Agoniston B, aka EOKA B). Three new newspapers advocating enosis were also established; all of these activities were funded by the military junta in Greece.

The junta probably would have agreed to some form of partition similar to the Acheson Plan to settle the Cyprus question, but it faced rejection by Makarios. The overthrow of Makarios became the primary objective, and the junta backed Grivas toward that end. From hiding, Grivas directed terrorist attacks and propaganda assaults that shook the Makarios government, but the president remained both a powerful and popular leader.

Relations between Nicosia and Athens were so bad that the colonels of the Greek junta, recognizing that they had Makarios in a perilous position, issued an ultimatum to him. They demanded that he purge his government of ministers who had been critical of the junta. Mass demonstrations proved that Makarios had the people behind him. In the end, however, Makarios bowed to Greek pressure and reshuffled the cabinet.

Another element working against Makarios was the fact that most officers of the Cypriot National Guard were Greek regulars who supported the junta, and they embraced its desire to remove him from office and achieve some degree of enosis. The veteran Grivas also continued to be a threat to the archbishop. He remained powerful and to some extent was independent of the junta that had permitted his return to Cyprus. While the Greek colonels were at times prepared to make a deal with Turkey about Cyprus, Grivas was ferociously opposed to any arrangement that did not lead to complete enosis.

In the spring of 1972, Makarios faced an attack from another quarter. The three bishops of the Church of Cyprus demanded that he resign as president, stating that his temporal duties violated canon law. Makarios foiled the three bishops and had them defrocked in the summer of 1973. Before choosing their replacements, he increased the number of bishops to five, thereby reducing the power of individual bishops.

As time progressed Grivas' pursuit of enosis through guerrilla tactics with the use of the EOKA-B's paramilitary organisation failed to force Makarios to follow the policy of self-determination-union with Greece and led to a period of armed civil war in Cyprus among the Greek-Cypriot community. In November 1973, Dimitrios Ioannidis, the hardliner nationalist brigadier, overthrew Georgios Papadopoulos (Greece's President since 1967) and established the Second Junta, with himself as the "invisible dictator". On 27 January 1974, Grivas died of a heart attack, uncertain to the end of Ioannidis' plans.

Meanwhile Makarios took advantage of Grivas' demise by granting an amnesty to the dead leader's followers. He hoped and believed that with Grivas gone, EOKA-B would disappear as a guerrilla force and could be politically tamed. Numerous EOKA-B members did actually accept the amnesty's terms, but this merely increased the hardliners' influence within the remainder of the movement. Ioannidis finally disclosed his aims: he imposed on the organisation a secret memorandum, by which EOKA-B would be committed to deposing Makarios.

=== Deposition and return ===
On 3 May 1974, Makarios sent the Greek government a letter that identified certain Greek military officers stationed in Cyprus as undermining the Cypriot government. The Greek regime responded that it would withdraw the officers in question. In the second half of June 1974, Makarios decided to take the initiative and challenge Athens directly. He believed that he could eliminate the junta's control of Cyprus by forcing the Cypriot National Guard to remain loyal to himself. On 2 July 1974 he wrote to the Athens colonels a letter which demanded that all Greek officers depart from the island within 19 days. Greek Foreign Minister Spyridon Tetenes suggested, as a compromise, that Makarios personally select the substitute officers from a roster of Greek officers; however Makarios refused this. On 11 July, Glafkos Klerides (by this stage the speaker of the Cypriot parliament) visited Makarios in an unsuccessful attempt to promote a solution.

Four days later, Ioannidis took Makarios by surprise by organizing a coup d'état in Nicosia at 8.15 am, when Makarios's forces were off guard. Makarios escaped to Paphos and was rescued by a British helicopter. He fled Cyprus when the pro-Greek forces took control of the whole of the island; at first there were false reports that he had been slain (cf. The Sydney Morning Herald, 16 July 1974, p. 1). Nikos Sampson, a Nicosia-based newspaper editor and parliamentarian with a long-standing commitment to enosis, was installed as president in Makarios' stead.

Speaking to the UN Security Council on 19 July, Makarios denounced the coup as an "invasion", engineered by the Greek military junta, which "violated the internal peace of Cyprus". Five hours after Makarios' address to the Security Council, the Turkish invasion of Cyprus began, taking Ioannidis by surprise. Under the terms of the Treaty of Guarantee, Britain, Greece and Turkey were entitled to co-operate in order to intervene with the purpose of restoring the constitution of the island.

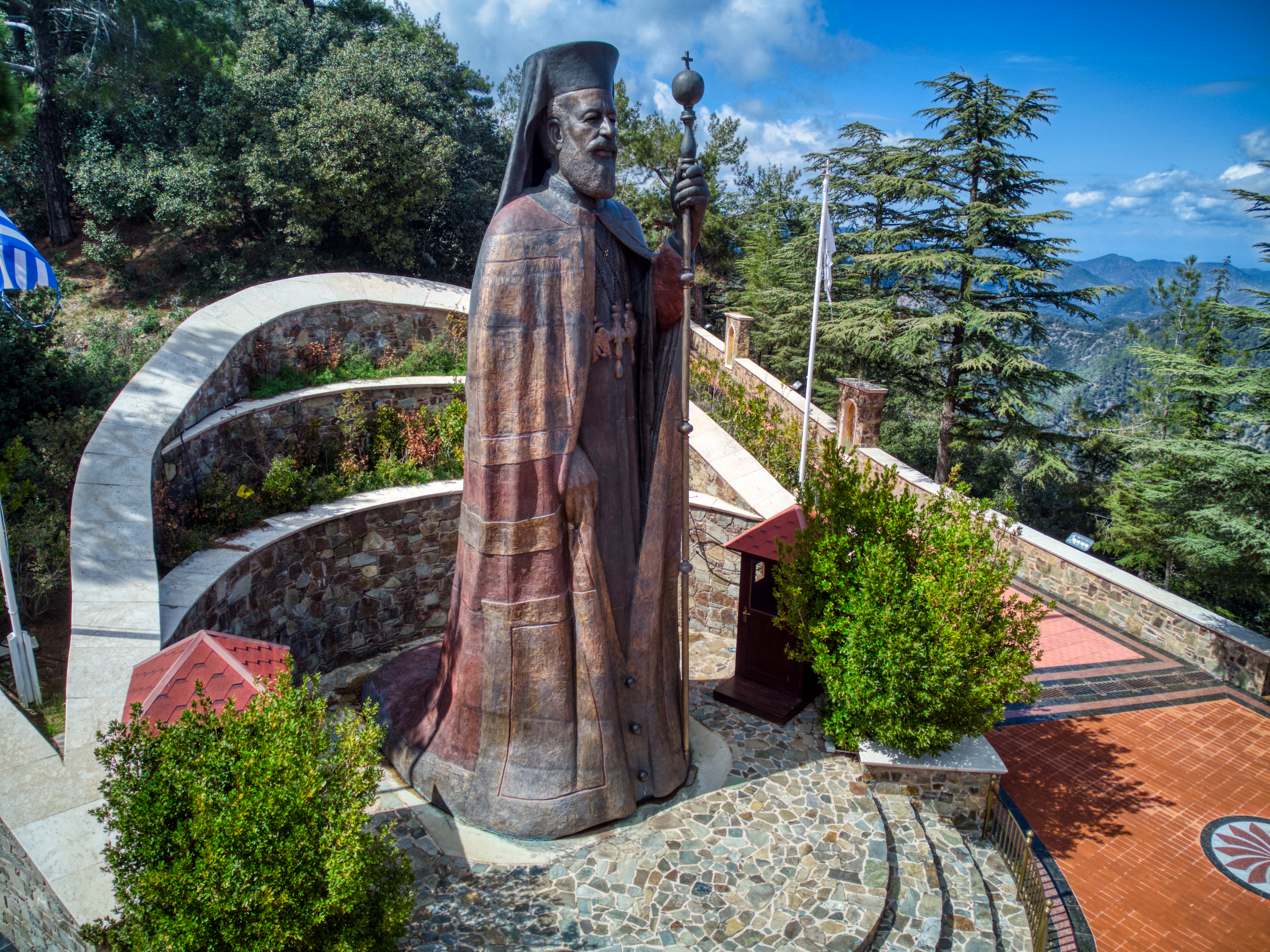
The statue of Archbishop Makarios III near the Kykkos Monastery

At this time the Greek junta was imploding, and the British government (led since February 1974 by Harold Wilson) was facing the constitutional uncertainty of a hung parliament; moreover, according to the Greek diplomat Ange Vlachos, while in London Makarios lobbied for the British military not to intervene as a guarantor power. The testimony of Vlachos is not supported by the confidential minutes of the meeting of Makarios and Prime Minister Wilson on 17 July 1974. According to the minutes, Makarios urged Wilson to convey to the Turkish Prime Minister, Bülent Ecevit, "what practical measures can be taken. It is against the Turkish interests for Cyprus to become part of Greece."

The Turkish invasion of Cyprus occurred on 20 July, five days after the coup. Following a series of failed negotiations, Turkish forces launched a second invasion and captured roughly 36% of the Republic of Cyprus, therein establishing what is now the unrecognized state of Northern Cyprus. To Turks and some Turkish Cypriots the invasion is still known as a "peace operation", designed to protect the Turkish Cypriot community. Although, according to the case of Cyprus v Turkey in the European Court of Human Rights, the "peace operation" amounted to armed conflict (as modern international law refrains from using the word war) between the Greek-Cypriot population of the island and Turkey.

Sampson's presidency was short-lived, because the regime of Ioannidis in Athens collapsed only a few days after the Turkish invasion. It was noted at the time that Turkey threatened to invade Greece, and that the colonels suddenly had to concentrate on trying to defend the country, rather than staying in power. The regime's failure to predict or prevent the Turkish intervention severely weakened its legitimacy and authority. Unsupported, Sampson resigned on 23 July and the presidency passed to Glafkos Klerides. Makarios remained in London for five months; then, having succeeded in securing international recognition that his administration was the rightful government of the whole island, he returned to Cyprus and with the focus of restoring Cypriot territory. He was not successful, and Turkey has remained as an occupying power ever since, with the political, military and diplomatic status of the island unresolved.

== Death ==
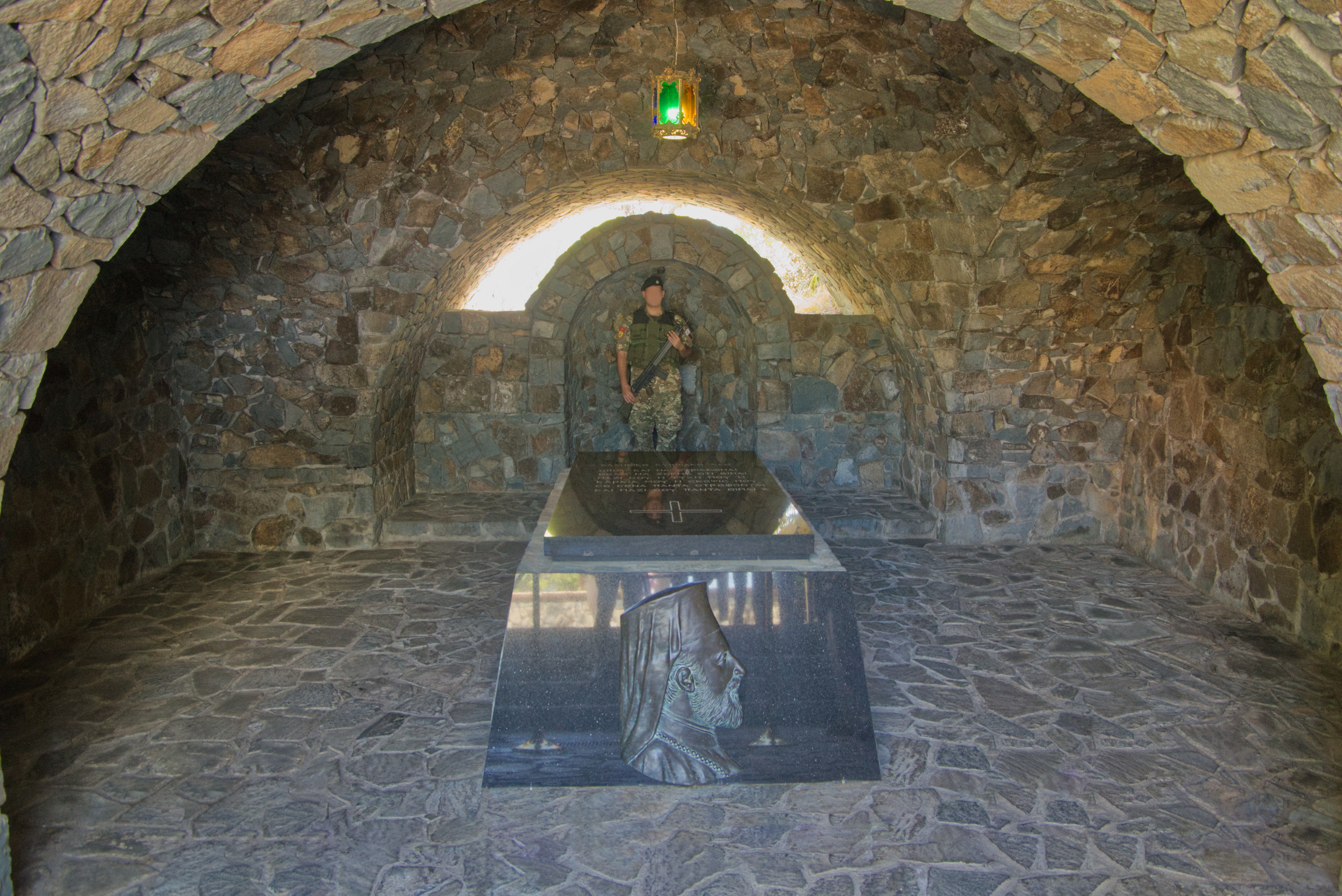
Makarios's tomb

Makarios III died of a heart attack on 3 August 1977, having experienced heart problems earlier that year. Makarios' heart was removed during an autopsy, and has since been preserved in his former bedroom in the Archbishop's Palace. He is buried in a tomb on Mount Throni, as per his wishes. The tomb is near Kykkos Monastery, where he was a novice in the 1920s and 1930s.

At his funeral in Saint John's Cathedral outside the Archbishopric in Nicosia, 182 dignitaries from 52 countries attended while an estimated 250,000 mourners—about half the Greek Cypriot population of the island—filed past his coffin.

To commemorate his life, a bronze statue of Makarios was erected outside the Archbishop's Palace in Nicosia; in 2008 the statue was moved to Kykkos Monastery and replaced by a life-size marble statue of Makarios.

== Honours ==
- Grand Cordon of the Order of the Nile
- Special class of the Grand Cross of the Order of Merit of the Federal Republic of Germany
- Grand Master of the Order of Orthodox Hospitallers
- Order of St. Equal to Apostles Prince Vladimir, 1st degree

== See also ==
- Foreign relations of Cyprus

== Notes ==
Religious titles
Preceded by Makarios II	Archbishop of Cyprus; 1950–1977	Succeeded by Chrysostomos I
Political offices
New title	President of Cyprus; 1960–1974	Succeeded by Nikos Sampson
Preceded by Glafcos Clerides as interim president	President of Cyprus; 1974–1977	Succeeded by Spyros Kyprianou
