= 1960 Cypriot by-elections =

1960 Cypriot Parliamentary by-elections

4 of 50 seats to the House of Representatives
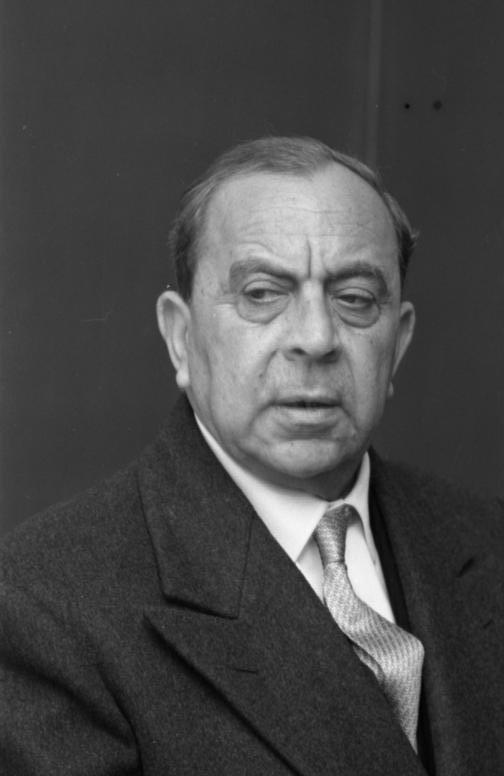
	First party	Second party
Candidate	Daphnis Panayides	Ibrahim Orhan, Ekrem Sarper, Nebil Nabi Beyin
Leader	Glafcos Clerides	Fazıl Küçük
Party	Patriotic Front	KMTB
Seats before	30	15
Seats after	30	14
Seat change	0	▼1
Popular vote	6,320	3,079 (Note: Based on average votes of all candidates.)
Percentage	68.9	33.0

By-elections were held in Cyprus on 25 September 1960 to fill four vacant seats in the 50-member House of Representatives. They were the first legislative by-elections ever held in the Republic of Cyprus. One candidate was elected unopposed, with voting only needed for three seats.

== Background ==
Cyprus gained its independence from the United Kingdom on 16 August 1960. The 1960 constitution provided for a system where the Greek and Turkish communities of the island would share power. The 50-seat House of Representatives had 35 seats elected by the Greek Community and 15 by the Turkish Community. The first parliamentary elections were held on 7 August 1960. In the Greek Community's contest, two parties, the Patriotic Front, which supported the President Makarios III, and the communist Progressive Party of Working People (AKEL) formed a pact, with the Patriotic Front fielding 30 candidates and AKEL five. All of their candidates were elected. In the Turkish Community's contest, all elected representatives were members of the Cyprus Turkish National Union, which was led by the vice-president of Cyprus Fazıl Küçük.

On 16 August 1960, four members of the House of Representatives were appointed ministers; Greek Cypriot Andreas Papadopoulos (Limassol) was appointed Minister of Communications and Works and Turkish Cypriots Osman Örek (Nicosia), Fazil Plumber (Nicosia) and Niyazi Manyera (Famagusta) were appointed Ministers of Defence, Agriculture and Health respectively. On 29 August 1960, the House of Representatives set 29 September as the date for the by-elections to fill the four vacant seats.

== Campaign ==
=== Greek Cypriots ===
For the Greek Community's seat in Limassol, the Patriotic Front's candidate was Daphnis Panayides, an EOKA veteran and a farmer. AKEL did not contest the seat, as it believed that it belonged to the Patriotic Front. The Pancyprian Farmers' Union (PEK) had previously supported the Patriotic Front, and 12 of the Patriotic Front's MPs came from PEK. However, PEK supported Panagiotis Orphanos, a farmer, and held a "conference of farmers from Limassol" which "decided unanimously" to endorse Orphanou's candidacy. Achilleas Malliotis, a doctor from Limassol, also submitted his candidacy.

In a statement dated 19 September PEK claimed that, after it had chosen Orphanos as its candidate, he proposed to Panayides to accept the candidacy of PEK instead, but Panayides refused. A few days later, according to PEK, Orphanos visited Panayides and Panayides reassured him he would not contest the seat, "despite pressure from the Patriotic Front." Later in its statement PEK urged everybody in Limassol to, "Work with fanaticism for the victory of PEK."

Daphnis Panayides replied to PEK's statement on 21 September, stating that, after his return to Cyprus, members of PEK approached him to inform him of their "irrevocable" decision to support Panayiotis Orphanos, which they would do "regardless of whether the Patriotic Front would." Panayides then stated he had responded he would support Orphanou's candidacy "only if it was endorsed by the Patriotic Front."

In a proclamation PEK implied it would end its support of the Patriotic Front, which it called, "The 'Patriotic Front'".

A proposal was made to the two candidates after Achilleas Malliotis withdrew his candidacy. The proposal, made by Glafkos Clerides, Polycarpos Georkadjis and Spyros Kyprianou, provided that they withdraw from the elections and discuss their mutual support for a third candidate in the Presidential Palace. This was rejected by PEK.

=== Turkish Cypriots ===
In Famagusta the Cyprus Turkish National Union's candidate, Nebil Nabi Beyin, was elected unopposed.

In Nicosia the Cyprus Turkish National Union fielded two candidates, Ibrahim Orhan and Ekrem Sarper, to contest the two vacant Turkish seats. One independent candidate, Kemal Deniz, also ran.

== Results ==
=== Greek Cypriots ===
1960 Limassol by-election
Candidate	Party	Votes	%	±
Daphnis Panayides	Patriotic Front	6,320	68.9	+13.3
Panagiotis Orphanos	Independent	2,853	31.1	N/A
Invalid/blank votes		101	1.1	-0.3
Total		9,274	100	–
Registered voters/turnout		45,978	20.2	-45.0
Source: Eleftheria

=== Turkish Cypriots ===
1960 Nicosia by-election
Candidate	Party	Votes	%
Ibrahim Orhan	Cyprus Turkish National Union	3,195	34.2
Kemal Deniz	Independent	3,193	34.1
Ekrem Sarper	Cyprus Turkish National Union	2,962	31.7
Source: Eleftheria
