= Kadriye Hulusi Hacıbulgur =

Turkish Cypriot politician

Member of the Turkish Communal Chamber
- In office 1960–1970
- Constituency: Nicosia

Personal details
- Born: 7 November 1905 Famagusta, Cyprus
- Died: 13 August 1988 (aged 82)

Kadriye Ahmed Hulusi Hacıbulgur (7 November 1905 – 13 August 1988) was a Turkish Cypriot politician. In 1960 she was elected to the Turkish Communal Chamber, jointly becoming the first woman elected to a legislative body in Cyprus alongside Constantia Varda, who had been elected to the Greek Communal Chamber.

== Biography ==
Hulusi was born in Famagusta in 1905. She attended Victoria Girls High School and went on to work as a teacher for 37 years, becoming a headteacher. Her pupils included Rauf Denktaş and Osman Örek.

In the 1960 parliamentary elections Hulusi was a Cyprus Turkish National Union candidate for the Turkish Communal Chamber in Nicosia, and was elected. She remained in office until 1970.

She died in August 1988. In 1996 she was featured on stamps of Northern Cyprus celebrating famous European women.
