= 2025 in Northern Cyprus =

- Decades: 2000s; 2010s; 2020s
- See also: Other events of 2025; Timeline of Northern Cypriot history

Events in 2025 in Northern Cyprus.

== Incumbents ==
- President – Ersin Tatar
- Prime Minister – Ünal Üstel

== Events ==
=== Ongoing ===
- Cyprus problem

=== April ===
- 4 April – Kazakhstan, Turkmenistan, and Uzbekistan declare their commitment to upholding United Nations Security Council Resolution 541 and Resolution 550. The resolutions condemn the 1983 Declaration of Independence of the Turkish Republic of Northern Cyprus.

=== May ===
- 1–4 May – Teknofest is held in Northern Cyprus for the first time.
- 3 May – The Republic Complex is inaugurated.

=== October ===
- 19 October – 2025 Northern Cypriot presidential election: Former prime minister Tufan Erhürman defeats incumbent president Ersin Tatar with 62.76% of the vote.
