= Constantia Varda =

Cypriot politician

Member of the Greek Communal Chamber
- In office 1960–1965
- Constituency: Nicosia

Personal details
- Born: 1916 Larnaca, Cyprus
- Died: 1993 (aged 76–77)

Constantia Miltonos Varda (1916–1993) was a Cypriot lawyer and politician. In 1960 she was elected to the Greek Communal Chamber, jointly becoming the first woman elected to a legislative body in Cyprus alongside Kadriye Hulusi Hacıbulgur, who had been elected to the Turkish Communal Chamber.

== Biography ==
Varda was born in Larnaca in 1916. She attended the Pancypriot Commercial High School in Larnaca, where she was a member of the school hockey team, completing her secondary education in 1933.

After leaving school she began working as a secretary in the law firm of Miltiadis Oikonomakis. While working at the firm, she met Miltiadis Varda who worked at the business next door; the two married in 1944. Oikonomakis was childless and encouraged Constantia to study law. After enrolling at the Middle Temple law school in London, she completed a LL.B course by correspondence, graduating in 1957, becoming the second female lawyer in Cyprus. During the second half of the 1950s she was a member of EOKA, a Greek Cypriot guerilla organisation. She defended several EOKA fighters in court.

In the 1960 parliamentary elections Varda was a Progressive Party of Working People (AKEL) candidate for the Greek Communal Chamber in Nicosia, and was the only woman elected to the Chamber. The Chamber effectively ceased functioning in 1963, and was abolished in 1965.

In 1985 she became president of the Larnaca Bar Association, a position she held until her death in 1993.
