= Wilfrid T. F. Castle =

British author and philatelist

- Born: Wilfrid Thomas Froggatt Castle; 12 June 1911; North Bierley, Yorkshire, England
- Died: 28 August 1999 (aged 88)
- Education: University of Cambridge
- Occupations: Clergyman and author
- Known for: Cyprus: Its postal history and postage stamps (1952)

Wilfrid Thomas Froggatt Castle (12 June 1911 – 28 August 1999) was a British Church of England clergyman, author, and philatelist who wrote on the history and philately of the former Ottoman Empire, and of Cyprus in particular.

After graduating from the University of Cambridge, he studied in Palestine. He worked as a chaplain in Cyprus and produced books on the history of Turkey (1942) and Syria (1947). In 1952, he published the first edition of his book on the postal history and stamps of Cyprus which went through three editions. The first treatment of the subject in book form, it became a standard authority on the subject. In 1974 he was the first president of the Cyprus Study Circle, a position he held until his death.

== Early life and education ==
Wilfrid Castle was born in North Bierley, Yorkshire, on 12 June 1911. He received his advanced education at the University of Cambridge, graduating BA in 1933. The same year, he published his first book: An English Parish Church of 1740 about Saint Peter's Church, Congleton, Cheshire, which was published in Gloucester by The British Publishing Company who specialised in church histories. He completed post-graduate studies in Palestine. In March 1940 he married May Louise Ritchie in Essex.

== Career ==
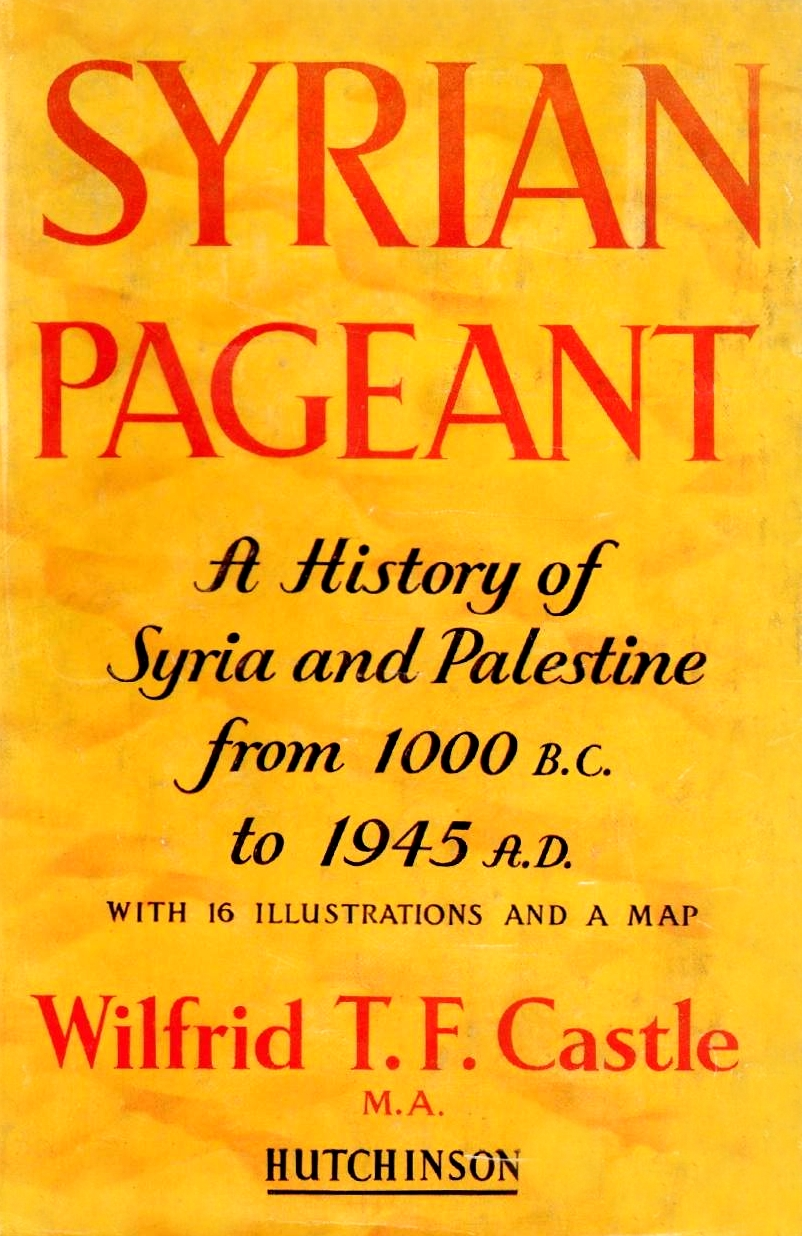
Syrian Pageant: The history of Syria and Palestine, 1000 B.C. to A.D. 1945 (1947)

In 1946, Castle was assistant chaplain for the Church of England in Famagusta, Cyprus, after which his interests centered on that island, but encompassed the whole of the eastern Mediterranean and former Ottoman Empire. He mixed religious, political, and historical material in his writings in works such as Grand Turk (1942) and Syrian Pageant (1947) which was published as part of the £10,000 United Nations Literary Competition. Syrian Pageant was criticised by George Kirk in International Affairs as "brief", "tasteless", unaccountably truncated, and showing that the author didn't understand Arabic.

A stamp collector from a young age, Castle published his first philatelic article at the age of 15 when he was already interested in the eastern Mediterranean area. He produced three editions of his book on the history, postal history, and postage stamps of Cyprus, the first published by Robson Lowe in 1952 with photographs by the author and titled Cyprus: Its postal history and postage stamps. It was based on a series of articles published in Lowe's The Philatelist in 1949–50 (Vol. XVI et seq.) and welcomed in The London Philatelist as the first book on the subject, previous writings on the philately of Cyprus having been in article form. The reviewer noted that the emphasis was on postal history rather than the stamps of the island which received more shallow treatment. A second edition with the same title was published in 1971, and a third in 1987 with the revised title Cyprus, 1353–1986: History, postal history and postage stamps. It became the standard work on the subject and is known to collectors simply as "Castle". The third edition was described in The London Philatelist as the vade mecum for all collectors of Cypriot philately.

He was the first president of the Cyprus Study Circle when it was formed in 1974, a position he held until his death, and wrote many of the articles for the Circle's journal Cyprus Circular Post.

His last book, The Imitator, was published around 1979.

== Death ==
Wilfrid Castle died at the age of 88 on 28 August 1999. He received an obituary in Gibbons Stamp Monthly.

== Selected publications ==
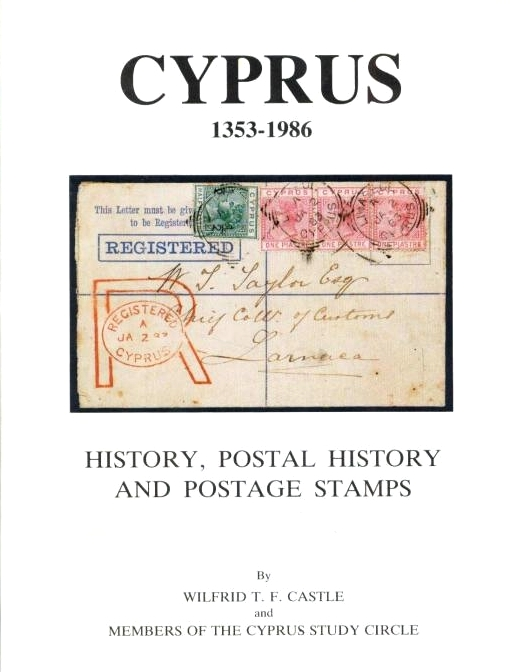
Cyprus 1353–1986: History, postal history and postage stamps (1987)

=== Articles ===
- "Stamps of Lebanon's Dog River", The Philatelic Magazine, 27 January 1961, pp. 54–55.
- "The Railway and the Post Office", Cyprus Circular Post, Vol. 1, No. 1 (May 1974).
- "Telegraph Services in the Ottoman Empire with Special Reference to Cyprus", OPAL, March 1992, Whole No. 177, pp. 4–12.

=== Books ===
- An English Parish Church of 1740 ... A history and description of Saint Peter's Congleton, Cheshire, etc. The British Publishing Company, Gloucester, c.1933.
- Grand Turk: An historical outline of life and events, of culture and politics, of trade and travel during the last years of the Ottoman Empire and the first years of the Turkish Republic.. Hutchinson, London, 1942.
- Syrian Pageant: The history of Syria and Palestine, 1000 B.C. to A.D. 1945. Hutchinson, London, 1947.
- Cyprus: Its postal history and postage stamps. Robson Lowe, 1952. (2nd edition 1971)
- Cyprus 1353–1986: History, postal history and postage stamps. Cyprus Study Circle & Christie's-Robson Lowe, London, 1987. ISBN 0853974187
- The Imitator. New Horizon, Bognor Regis, c.1979. ISBN 0861162641
