= 1968 Cypriot presidential election =

- 25 February 1968
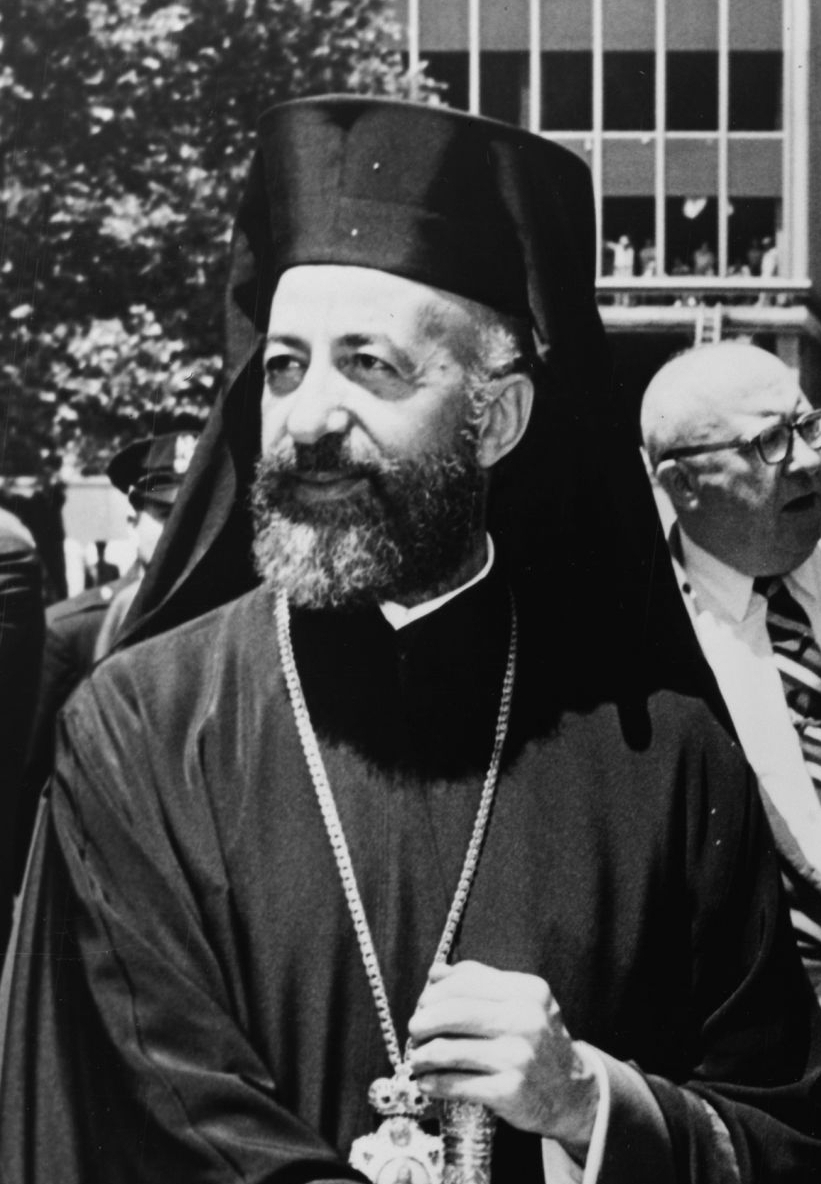

Candidate	Makarios III	Takis Evdokas
Popular vote	220,911	8,577
Percentage	96.26%	3.74%
- Results by district
President before election
Makarios III
Elected President
Makarios III

Presidential elections were held in Cyprus on 25 February 1968. The result was a victory for the incumbent President Makarios III, who received 96% of the vote. Voter turnout was 93%.

Separate elections were held for the vice presidency, which were won by Fazıl Küçük.

== Electoral system ==
The elections were held using a two-round system; if no candidate received over 50% of the vote in the first round, a second round was to be held between the top two candidates. The constitution required the President of Cyprus to be a Greek Cypriot and the Vice-President to be a Turkish Cypriot. Greek Cypriots elected the President and Turkish Cypriots elected the Vice-President.

== Results ==
Candidate	Votes	%
Makarios III	220,911	96.26
Takis Evdokas	8,577	3.74
Total	229,488	100.00
Valid votes	229,488	99.16
Invalid/blank votes	1,950	0.84
Total votes	231,438	100.00
Registered voters/turnout	247,653	93.45
Source: Nohlen & Stöver
