= Treaty of Guarantee (1960) =

1960 treaty among Cyprus, Greece, Turkey, and the UK

The Treaty of Guarantee is a treaty between Cyprus, Greece, Turkey, and the United Kingdom that was promulgated on 16 August 1960.

Article I banned Cyprus from participating in any political union or economic union with any other state. Article II requires the other parties to guarantee the independence, territorial integrity, and security of Cyprus. Article IV reserves the right of the guarantor powers to take action to re-establish the current state of affairs in Cyprus, a provision that was used for the Turkish invasion of 1974. The treaty also allowed the United Kingdom to retain sovereignty over two military bases, Akrotiri and Dhekelia.

Article IV entitled these three guarantor powers to multilateral action among them or, as a last resort if no concerted action seemed possible, each guarantor to unilateral actions confined to restoring its status according to the treaty as a democratic, bicommunal, single, sovereign independent state:

In the event of a breach of the provisions of the present Treaty, Greece, Turkey and the United Kingdom undertake to consult together with respect to the representations or measures necessary to ensure observance of those provisions.

In so far as common or concerted action may not prove possible, each of the three guaranteeing Powers reserves the right to take action with the sole aim of re-establishing the state of affairs created by the present Treaty.

Initially, a bicommunal independent state was at stake because of the July 1974 coup and several Turkish Cypriot enclaves being attacked at the onset of the coup. Those circumstances made Turkey claim the right to unilateral action, as provided by the treaty, by first invading and creating a bridgehead and corridor between Kyrenia and Nicosia enclave.

Following the failure of peace talks, Turkey launched the second phase of the invasion. Turkish forces captured approximately 36% of the island, resulting in its de facto partition. On 15 November 1983, the Turkish Cypriot administration unilaterally declared independence as the Turkish Republic of Northern Cyprus (TRNC), which is recognized only by Turkey.

Turkish Cypriots and Turkey view the second invasion and the effective partition as legal, citing how bicommunalism had already ended from 1964 and onwards. They maintain that the Turkish intervention did not alter the state of affairs created by the 1960 treaties, as separated communities already existed before the intervention, after provisions guaranteeing equal status of the two communities had already been violated by Greek Cypriot amendments.

The treaty was concluded the same year that the Constitution of Cyprus was finalised, and the Zürich and London Agreement and the Treaty of Alliance between Cyprus, Greece and Turkey were written.

== See also ==
- Cyprus dispute
