= George Kirk =

George Kirk may refer to:

- George Kirk (MP) (1831–1912), Irish Home Rule League politician
- George Washington Kirk (1837–1905), soldier who served in American Civil War
- George Eden Kirk, professor of history
- George Kirk (Star Trek), fictional father of the character James T. Kirk, from Star Trek
