= 1973 Cypriot presidential election =

- 18 February 1973
- Presidential election
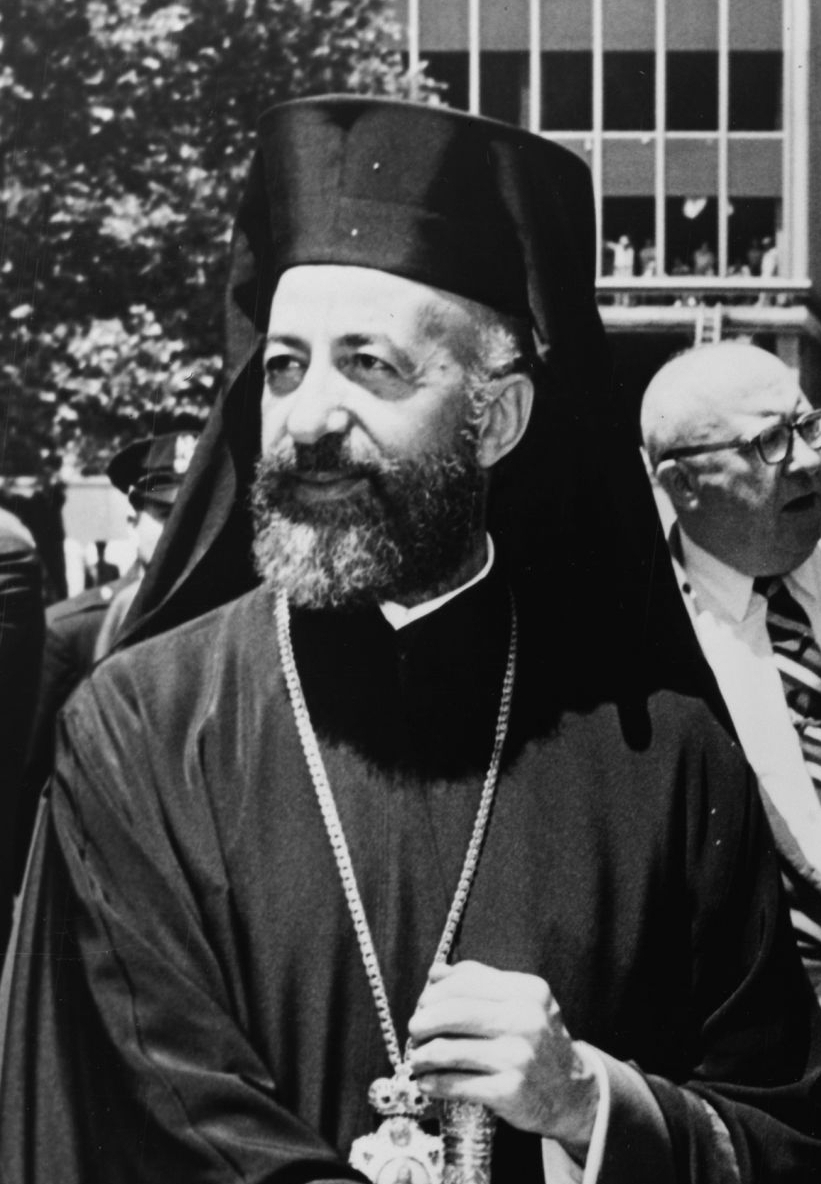
Candidate	Makarios III
Popular vote	Unopposed
President before election
Makarios III
Elected President
Makarios III
- Vice Presidential election
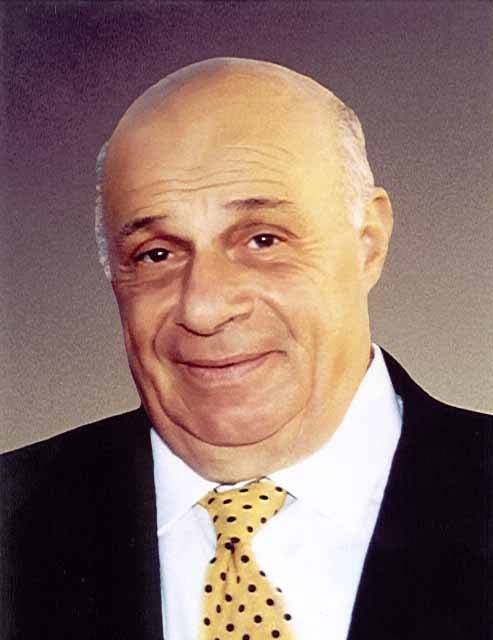
Candidate	Rauf Denktaş
Popular vote	Unopposed
Vice President before election
Fazıl Küçük
Elected Vice President
Rauf Denktaş

Presidential elections were due to be held in Cyprus on 18 February 1973. However, as incumbent president Makarios III was the only candidate, the elections were not held and Makarios III was automatically declared the winner.

A separate election for the vice presidency took place. Rauf Denktaş stood unopposed and was elected.

== Electoral system ==
The elections were held using a two-round system; if no candidate received over 50% of the vote in the first round, a second round was to be held between the top two candidates. The constitution required the president to be a Greek Cypriot and the vice president to be a Turkish Cypriot. Greek Cypriots elected the president and Turkish Cypriots elected the vice president.
