= 1959 Cypriot presidential election =

- 13 December 1959
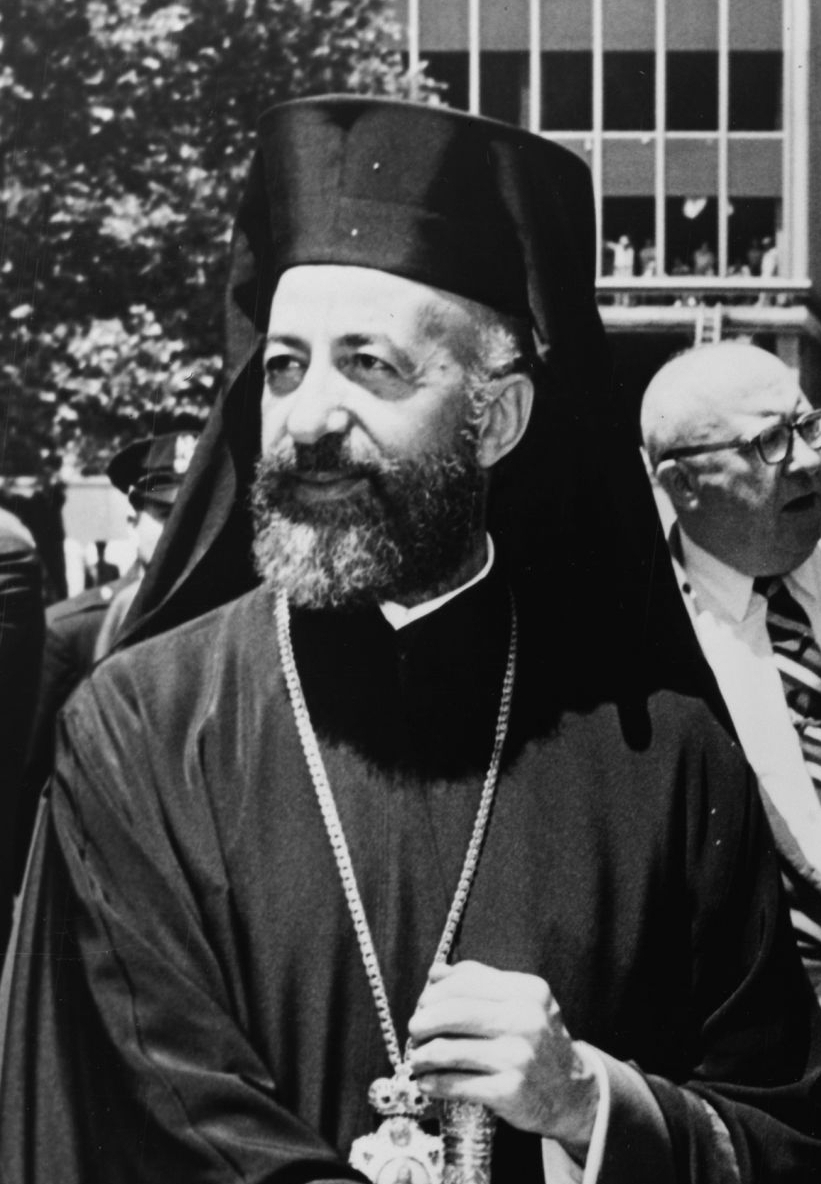

Candidate	Makarios III	Ioannis Clerides
Party	Independent	DIC
Alliance	EDMA	Supported by AKEL
Popular vote	114,501	71,753
Percentage	66.82%	33.18%
- Results by district
Elected President
Makarios III

Presidential elections were held in Cyprus for the first time on 13 December 1959. Only two candidates contested the election; Makarios III, who was backed by EOKA, and Ioannis Clerides, a member of the Democratic Union who was also supported by AKEL. The result was a victory for Makarios III, who received 67% of the vote, although he did not take office until 16 August 1960. Voter turnout was 91.2%.

A separate election for Vice President of Cyprus took place. Fazıl Küçük was the only candidate, and was elected unopposed.

== Electoral system ==
The elections were held using a two-round system; if no candidate received over 50% of the vote in the first round, a second round was to be held between the top two candidates. The constitution required the President of Cyprus to be a Greek Cypriot and the Vice-President to be a Turkish Cypriot. Greek Cypriots elected the President and Turkish Cypriots elected the Vice-President.

== Results ==
Candidate	Votes	%
Makarios III	144,501	66.82
Ioannis Clerides	71,753	33.18
Total	216,254	100.00
Valid votes	216,254	99.22
Invalid/blank votes	1,702	0.78
Total votes	217,956	100.00
Registered voters/turnout	238,879	91.24
Source: Nohlen & Stöver
