= Achilleas G. Exarchos =

Greek diplomat and philanthropist

His Excellency Achilleas G. Exarchos
- Αχιλλέας Γ Έξαρχος
- Born: City of Corfu, Corfu, Greece
- Citizenship: Greek
- Occupations: Diplomat and Philanthropist
- Employer(s): Ministry of Foreign affairs, Hellenic Republic The AG leventis Foundation
- Title: His Exelency
- Spouse: Theodora Exarchos nee: Vovides (Married 1960-2010)
- Children: Nicholas Exarchos; Kyprianos Exarchos-Vovides; George Exarchos
- Parent(s): Georgios Exarchos; Aggeliki Exarchos, née Chrysovitsianou
- Relatives: Theodoros Exarchos (brother)
- Family: GrandChildren Achilleas Exarchos Theodora Exarchou Costantinos Exarchos Alexandros Exarchos
- Honours: Commander of the Greek Order of George I Commander of the Greek Order of the Phoenix; Commander of the Bulgarian Order of the knight of Madara; Cross first Class of the Romanian Order of Theodore Vladimirescu Knight of the Italian Order of Merit

Achilleas G. Exarchos or Achilles G. Exarchos (Greek: Αχιλλέας Γ. Έξαρχος) (1924, in Corfu – 2013, in Athens) was a career diplomat and philanthropist, who at the beginning of his diplomatic career was closely involved in the London and Zurich agreements and the creation of the Republic of Cyprus in 1960.

== Biography ==
Achilleas Exarchos was born in November 1924, in the town of Corfu, Greece. His Father was George Exarchos, a Lawyer who later became Deputy Governor of the Agricultural Bank of Greece. His mother was Angeliki Exarchos (née Chrisovitsianos).

Both his grandfathers were doctors. Dr. Theodoros Chrisovitsianos (Greek: θεὀδωρος Xρυσοβιτσιανος), was a prominent pediatrician in Corfu and Dr. Achilleas D. Exarchos (Αχιλλέας Δ. Έξαρχος) was a prominent doctor in Trikala, Thessali, who later became mayor of a member of the Greek Parliament.

His brother was actor and writer, Theodoros Exarchos (Greek: Θεόδωρος Έξαρχος).

While in Cyprus he met and in 1962 married Theodora Exarchos, née Vovides, (Greek : Θεόδωρα Έξαρχου - Βωβίδη) 1939-2010, and had 3 sons, Nicholas Exarchos b1964, Kyprianos (aka: Kyp) Exarchos-Vovides b1968 and George Exarchos b1970.

== Education ==
1948 Graduated from the University of Thessaloniki, Law School.
1949-1950 Post Graduate Studies in Public Administration and Management, USA Bureau of the Budget, Washington, DC.
1949-1950 Post Graduate Studies in Economics and Public Finance, American University, Washington D.C.
1951-1953 Post Graduate Studies in Economics and Public Finance and Economic Policy. University of Rome, Italy.

== Career ==
1942-1956 Greek Ministry of Finance (General Directorate of the Budget)
1945-1956 Member of official Missions abroad of the Greek Ministry of Finance (Paris, London, Rome).
1956 Passes the admission exams and starts his diplomatic career
1956-1959 At the Ministry of Foreign Affairs, Athens
1959-1960 Vice-Consul at the Consulate General of Greece, Nicosia, Cyprus
1960-1964 First Secretary at the Embassy of Greece, Nicosia, Cyprus
1964-1967 Consul of Greece in Naples, Italy
1967-1970 Counselor at the Greek Embassy Sofia, Bulgaria
1970-1975 Consul General of Greece in London
1975-1977 Ambassador, Chief of the Department of Bilateral Economic Relations and Agreements at the Ministry of Foreign Affairs, Athens.
1977-1980 Ambassador of Greece to Nigeria. Accredited as well as Ambassador to Benin, Togo, Sierra Leone, Ghana, Niger, Guinea (Conakry) and Upper Volta (actual Burkina Faso).
1980-1982 Ambassador-Permanent Representative of Greece to the UN/F.A.O., UN/World Food Programme (WFP), the UN/World Food Council. (WFC) and Governor for Greece to the International Fund for Agricultural Development (IFAD), Rome, Italy.
1982 Retired.
1956-1982 Participant to International meetings and activities of the United Nations and their specialized Agencies.
1983-2003 Representative of the A.G. Leventis Cultural Foundation in Greece and Executive Director of the Foundation's Athens Office.
2003-2013 Special Adviser to the A.G. Leventis Foundation.

- Founding member of the Biopolitics International Organization.
- Founding member of OMEPO (Association for the support of Cultural Activities) and President of its Administrative Board since its establishment 1985 to 1997.

== Decorations ==
- Commander of the Greek Order of George I,
- Commander of the Greek Order of the Phoenix,
- Commander of the Bulgarian Order of the knight of Madara,
- Cross first Class of the Romanian Order of Theodore Vladimirescu,
- Knight of the Italian Order of Merit.

== Sources ==
- http://www.kathimerini.gr/736547/opinion/epikairothta/arxeio-monimes-sthles/apoxairetismos-ston-axillea-e3arxo-presvh-et-kai-me-prosfora-ston-politismo
- Aikaterina Laskarides Foundation
