= Treaty of Alliance =

Treaty of Alliance may refer to:

- Treaty of Alliance (1778) between France and the United States
- Treaty of Alliance (1960) between Cyprus, Greece and Turkey
