= 1960 Cypriot legislative election =

- 31 July 1960

All 50 seats in the House of Representatives
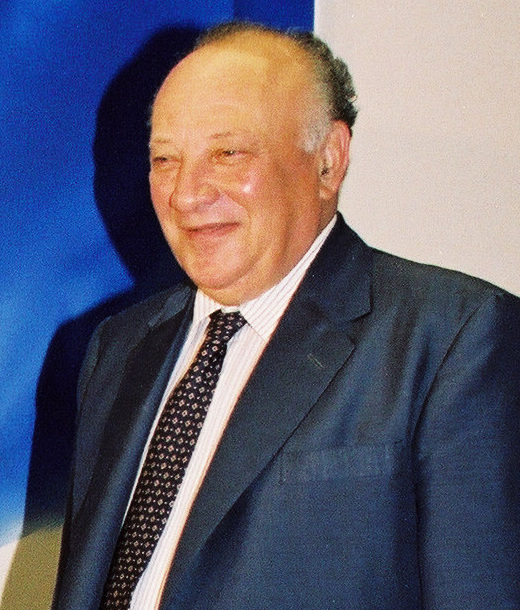

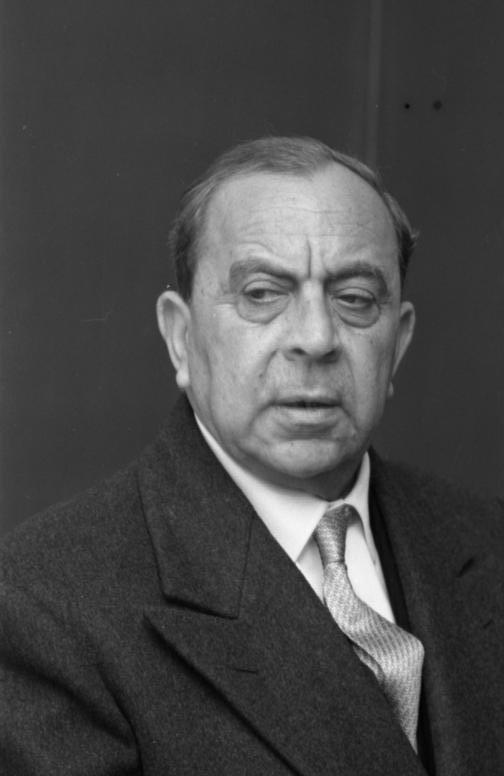

	First party	Second party	Third party
Leader	Glafkos Clerides	Fazıl Küçük	Ezekias Papaioannou
Party	Patriotic Front	KMTB	AKEL
Seats won	30	15	5
- Results by constituency.

Parliamentary elections were held in Cyprus in 1960. The House of Representatives was elected on 31 July 1960. The Communal Chambers were also elected on 7 August. In the House of Representatives 35 seats were elected by Greek Cypriots and 15 by Turkish Cypriots. The result was a victory for the Patriotic Front, which won 30 of the 50 seats. In the Communal Chambers, the Patriotic Front won the majority of seats in the Greek Chamber, whilst the Cyprus Turkish National Union won all seats in the Turkish Chamber.

== Electoral system ==
The House of Representatives consisted of 35 Greek members and 15 Turkish members, whilst the Greek Communal Chamber had 26 members and the Turkish Communal Chamber had 30.

The 1959 electoral law divided Cyprus into six multi-member constituencies. Voters could vote for as many candidates as there were seats in their constituency. The electoral system used was Plurality voting.

Constituency	Greek Community Seats	Turkish Community Seats
Nicosia	12	5
Kyrenia	2	1
Famagusta	7	3
Larnaca	3	2
Limassol	7	2
Paphos	4	2

== Campaign ==
The Democratic Union led by Themistocles Dervis and Ioannis Clerides did not participate in the elections. The Democratic Union had opposed the 1959 electoral law, claiming it favoured the Patriotic Front.

The Patriotic Front and AKEL formed a pact for the elections, with a pre-agreed split of 30 and 5 seats respectively.

The hastily formed Pancyprian Union of Fighters fielded four candidates, with two in Nicosia, one in Kyrenia and one in Larnaca.

The Patriotic Front and AKEL pressured independent candidates to withdraw from the elections. As a result, the only female candidate, Kallistheni Maouni (Limassol), withdrew her candidacy.

In Paphos, the three candidates of the Patriotic Front and one candidate of AKEL were elected unopposed.

In the fifteen Turkish seats, eight members of the Cyprus Turkish National Union, which was led by Vice-President Fazıl Küçük, ran unopposed in Nicosia, Kyrenia and Larnaca, whilst six independent candidates ran against the Cyprus Turkish National Union’s candidates in Famagusta, Limassol and Paphos.

The Patriotic Front and AKEL also formed an electoral pact for the Communal Chambers, with a pre-agreed split of 20 and 3 seats respectively. They reserved three seats for the Latin, Armenian and Maronite Communities, which had opted to join the Greek Community upon independence.

For the 26 seats in the Greek Chamber 31 candidacies were submitted. In Larnaca the three candidates of the Patriotic Front and in Limassol the three candidates of the Patriotic front and one candidate of AKEL were elected unopposed. For the 30 seats of the Turkish Chamber 31 candidacies were submitted, 30 of which were members of the Cyprus Turkish National Union. The Cyprus Turkish National Union's 10, 6, 2, 4 and 4 candidates in Nicosia, Famagusta, Kyrenia, Larnaca and Paphos respectively were declared elected unopposed.

The agreement reached by the Patriotic Front and AKEL also provided that the two parties would avoid the holding of elections, and independent candidates were pressured to withdraw. In Nicosia, independent candidate Christodoulos Pipis withdrew his candidacy and the six candidates of the Patriotic Front, one candidate of AKEL, Latin candidate Anthony Pietroni and Armenian candidate Berge Tilbian (who ran as a candidate for the Patriotic Front) were declared elected unopposed. In Paphos, on 3 August independent candidate Efthivoulos Ieropoulos withdrew his candidacy and the two candidates of the Patriotic Front and one candidate of AKEL were declared elected unopposed. In Famagusta, on 6 August (one day before the elections) independent candidate Polyvios Mavrommatis withdrew his candidacy and the four candidates of the Patriotic Front were declared elected unopposed.

Informal elections were held to decide the candidate for the Armenian community on 5 August. The winner of these elections would run as a candidate for the Patriotic Front in Nicosia and the other candidates would withdraw their candidacies. These were won by Berge Tilbian, and Vahram Levonian withdrew his candidacy.

In Kyrenia, independent candidate Savvas Christis refused to withdraw from the elections and ran against the three candidates of the Patriotic Front (including the Maronite candidate, Ioannis Mavrides).

In the Turkish Chamber, independent candidate Beukagi Kioproulou was pressured into withdrawing his candidacy in Limassol and the four candidates of the Cyprus Turkish National Union were declared elected unopposed. Therefore, no elections were held for the Turkish Chamber and the Cyprus Turkish National Union won all 30 seats.

== Results ==
=== House of Representatives ===
Party	Votes	% (Note: The votes shown are based on the average number of votes received by each party (across all their candidates) in each constituency. The percentages are calculated based on the total valid votes rather than the total of average votes, meaning they may total more (or less) than 100%.)	Seats
Greek Community
Patriotic Front	82,889	60.44	30
Progressive Party of Working People	51,719	37.71	5
Pancyprian Union of Fighters	6,608	4.82	0
Independents	7,229	5.27	0
Total	137,145	100	35
Valid votes	137,145	98.45	
Invalid/blank votes	2,156	1.55	
Total	139,301	100	
Registered voters/turnout	215,155	64.74	
Turkish Community
Cyprus Turkish National Union	11,738	68.80	15
Independents	3,460	20.28	0
Total	16,628	100	15
Valid votes	16,628	97.46	
Invalid/blank votes	434	2.54	
Total	17,062	100	
Registered voters/turnout	23,005	74.17	
Source: Eklektor, Ethnos			

==== By constituency ====
===== Greek Community =====
Party	Nicosia			Kyrenia			Famagusta			Larnaca			Limassol		
Party	Votes	%	Seats	Votes	%	Seats	Votes	%	Seats	Votes	%	Seats	Votes	%	Seats
Patriotic Front	31,318	58.24	10	6,761	80.45	2	20,075	55.91	6	8,313	87.43	3	16,422	55.57	6
AKEL	22,463	42.08	2	–	–	–	15,396	42.88	1	–	–	–	13,860	46.90	1
Pancyprian Union of Fighters	3,571	6.69	0	1,826	21.73	0	–	–	–	1,211	12.74	0	–	–	–
Independents	727	1.36	0	–	–	–	3,478	9.69	0	197	2.07	0	2,827	9.57	0
Total	53,771	100	12	8,404	100	2	35,909	100	7	9,508	100	3	29,553	100	7
Valid votes	53,771	98.03		8,404	98.70		35,909	98.74		9,508	99.14		29,553	98.59	
Invalid/blank votes	1,083	1.97		111	1.30		458	1.26		82	0.86		422	1.41	
Total	54,854	100		8,515	100		36,367	100		9,590	100		29,975	100	
Registered voters/turnout	83,253	65.89		14,366	59.27		48,361	75.20		23,207	41.32		45,968	65.21	
Source: Eklektor

===== Turkish Community =====
Party	Famagusta			Limassol			Paphos		
Party	Votes	%	Seats	Votes	%	Seats	Votes	%	Seats
Cyprus Turkish National Union	5,019	73.90	3	2,494	51.26	2	4,225	78.16	2
Independents	856	12.60	0	1,380	20.32	0	1,224	22.65	0
Total	6,792	100	3	4,865	100	2	5,405	100	2
Registered voters/turnout	9,154	74.20		6,561	74.15		7,290	74.14	
Source: Ethnos

=== Communal Chambers ===
Party	Votes	%	Seats
Greek Chamber
Patriotic Front	5,061	88.29	20
AKEL	–	–	3
Armenians	–	–	1
Maronites	5,012	87.44	1
Latins	–	–	1
Independent	618	10.78	0
Total	5,732	100	26
Registered voters/turnout	14,366	39.9	–
Turkish Chamber
Cyprus Turkish National Union	–	–	30
Total	–	–	30
Source: Papademitris, Conley

==== By constituency ====
Party	Votes	%	Seats
Kyrenia
Patriotic Front (Note: This included Maronite candidate Ioannis Mavrides, who received 5,012 votes.)	5,045	88.01	3
Independent	618	10.78	0
Total	5,732	100	3
Registered voters/turnout	14,366	39.9	–
Source: Papademitris

Candidate	Votes	%
Armenians (Unofficial)
Berge Tilbian	1,364	60.49
Vahram Levonian	891	39.51
Invalid/blank votes	19	0.84
Total	2,274	100
Source: Papademitris

== Aftermath ==
Following the elections, Glafcos Clerides was elected president of the House of Representatives and Orhan Muderisoglu was elected vice-president, and a 12-member cabinet was formed.

Member	Position
Minister of Agriculture	Fazil Plumber
Minister of Commerce and Industry	Andreas Araouzos
Minister of Communications and Works	Andreas Papadopoulos
Minister of Defence	Osman Örek
Minister of Finance	Reghinos Theocharous
Minister of Foreign Affairs	Spyros Kyprianou
Minister of Health	Niyazi Manyera
Minister of the Interior	Polycarpos Georgadjis
Minister of Justice	Stella Souliotou
Minister of Labour and Social Services	Tassos Papadopoulos
Deputy Minister of Agriculture	Andreas Azinas
Deputy Minister of Health	Mehmet Nazim

By-elections were held shortly after the elections as four of the elected MPs, Fazil Plumber, Andreas Papadopoulos, Osman Örek and Niyazi Manyera were appointed ministers.

On 21 July 1961 Patriotic Front MP Lefkios Rodosthenous was removed from the House of Representatives. His seat remained vacant for the rest of his term.

In 1961 the Independent Turkish Group was created by eleven of the Turkish-Cypriot MPs. It was led by Orhan Muderisoglu.

In 1962 MP Petros Stylianou left the Patriotic Front and continued as an Independent for the remainder of his term.

In 1963 Turkish-Cypriot MP Shemshedin Halit Kazım died in a car accident. His seat was filled by his wife Ayla Halit Kazım. In December 1963 the Turkish Cypriots withdrew from participation in the government, leaving Parliament with only its Greek members.

On 21 April 1966 Patriotic Front MPs Titos Fanos and Georgios Tompazos were appointed ministers of agriculture and works respectively, and resigned from the House of Representatives. Their seats remained vacant for the rest of their respective terms. Another MP, Costas Christodoulides, left the Patriotic Front, and Daphnis Panayides, elected in the first by-elections, resigned from the House of Representatives in that same year. Panayides' seat also remained vacant.
