= Revenue stamps of Northern Cyprus =

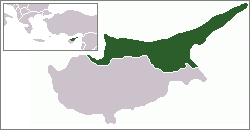
The location of the Turkish Republic of Northern Cyprus.

Turkish Cypriots first issued revenue stamps in 1962 as part of Cyprus; after 1983 of the UDI of Northern Cyprus, the country has continued to issue the stamps to this day.

== Revenue ==
Northern Cyprus first issued stamps in 1962 as part of the Republic of Cyprus. They had a monogram TCM (Türk Cemaat Meclisi - Turkish Cypriot State) and continued to be reprinted until 1976. There were surcharges on this issue in new currency in 1976 and 1978. A similar issue but with new currency and the monogram KTFD (Kıbrıs Türk Federe Devleti - Turkish Cyprus Federated State). With independence in 1983, a new issue with the monogram KKTC (Kuzey Kıbrıs Türk Cumhuriyeti - Turkish Republic of Northern Cyprus) was issued. This design was reissued with a number of differences since then.

== Izin Fonu (Holiday and sickness benefits) ==
The first Izin Fonu stamps of Northern Cyprus were issued around 1970. They were inscribed KIBRIS TURK YONETIMI. In 1972, stamps were overprinted with the appropriate inscription, and later that year another issue, inscribed K.T.F.D., was issued. This was followed by another issue in around 2000 which was inscribed K.K.T.C.

== Yardim Pulu (Social Insurance) ==
The first Yardim Pulu stamps were issued in April 1970 and had no value due to inflation. A second issue followed in 2001 with a map of Cyprus and a star and crescent.

== Forestry Fund ==
Forestry fund stamps were used to pay a fund to aid afforestation. It was a compulsory tax from 1995 to 1996, and voluntary after that. Only two were issued, with the face values of 1000 and 50000 lira.

== See also ==
- Postage stamps and postal history of Northern Cyprus
- Revenue stamps of Cyprus
