= Ramiz Manyera =

Ramiz Manyera (died April 4, 2023 Nicosia) was a Turkish Cypriot businessperson, entrepreneur, and politician.

== Early life ==
He was born in Cyprus and, after completing his primary and secondary education on the island, went to Lebanon, where he graduated from the Business Administration Department of the American University of Beirut. He then returned to the island. He is the son of Dr. Niyazi Manyera, one of the three Turkish ministers of the Republic of Cyprus, which was established in 1960.

== Career ==
Ramiz Manyera, recognizing the gaps in the beverage industry during the early days of globally renowned brands like Coca-Cola and Pepsi-Cola, invested in this sector and became the first investor to introduce canned soda to both Cyprus and Turkey. He began his professional career in 1958 with Bola Cola, but had to sell it to Turkish bottlers when his business was unsuccessful.

As one of the island’s oldest industrialists, Manyera notes that he was the first Turkish Cypriot industrialist among the Turkish and Greek communities who lived together at the time.

In 1974, he launched Bixi Cola. With brands like Bixi Cola, Bubble Up, and Bel Cola, he became a prominent figure in the industry, achieving what the Turkish Cypriot community has yet to accomplish even today. Later, due to an embargo imposed by Turkey on Bixi Cola, he was forced to leave the industrial sector and turned to trade by becoming the representative of Nestlé.

== Politics ==
In the 1981 elections of the Turkish Federated State of Cyprus, Ramiz Manyera ran as a parliamentary candidate for the National Unity Party. He served as the president of the Cyprus Turkish Chamber of Commerce between 1978 and 1979. In the 1986 municipal elections, he ran as a candidate for Mayor of the Nicosia Turkish Municipality, finishing in second place with 40.93% of the vote, while Mustafa Akıncı was elected mayor.

Ramiz Manyera died on April 4, 2023.
