= Postage stamps and postal history of Northern Cyprus =

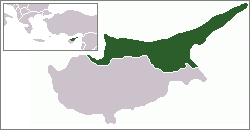
The location of the Turkish Republic of Northern Cyprus

This is a survey of the postage stamps and postal history of Northern Cyprus, otherwise known as the Turkish Republic of Northern Cyprus.

Northern Cyprus is not a member of the Universal Postal Union. International mail for Northern Cyprus travels via Turkey.

== First stamps ==
The first stamps of Northern Cyprus were issued on 8 April 1970 but were valid only for local services in the North. In October 1973, stamps were issued to mark the 50th anniversary of the Turkish Republic, and these were used for international mail from 27 July 1974.

== See also ==
- Postage stamps and postal history of Cyprus
- Revenue stamps of Northern Cyprus
