= Postage stamps and postal history of Cyprus =

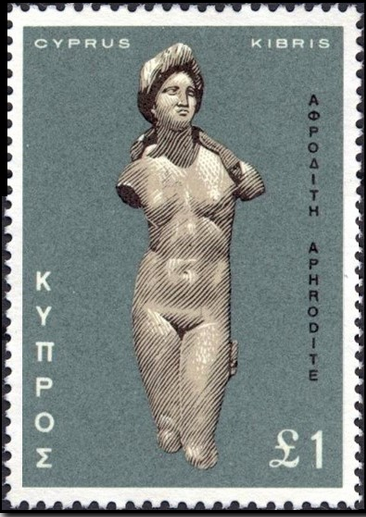
1966 stamps of Cyprus

This is a survey of the postage stamps and postal history of Cyprus. The country's postal history is intricately linked to the island's political past.

== Ottoman and Austrian postal services ==
Postal services existed during the Venetian and Ottoman periods of occupation. There was an Ottoman postal service in Nicosia from 1871 where mail was hand stamped "KIBRIS". A few Turkish Duloz stamps are known used on fragments or as singles (no complete cover has yet been found). Stamps of the Austrian post offices in the Turkish empire were used at Larnaca from 1864 with values up to 25 kreuzer.

== The British administration ==
The British administration of Cyprus began on 11 July 1878 and initially British stamps were used which may be identified by the numbered cancels used.

The first postage stamps marked Cyprus were British stamps overprinted CYPRUS from 1880.

The first postage stamps produced specifically for use in Cyprus, rather than being overprinted British stamps, were issued on 1 July 1881.

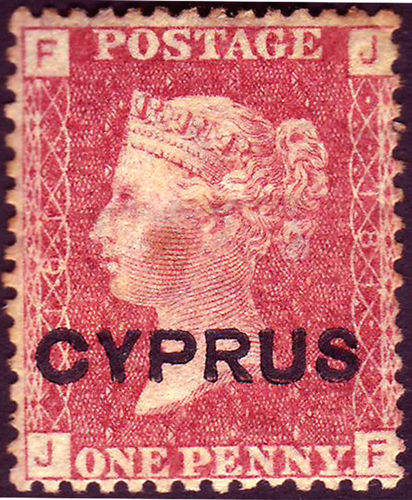
British Penny Red overprinted for use in Cyprus from 1880 (Plate 181)

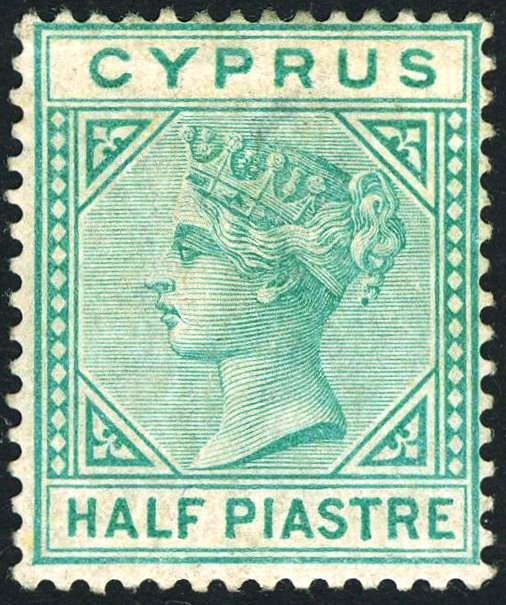
1881 half piastre stamp of Cyprus from the first series designed solely for the island

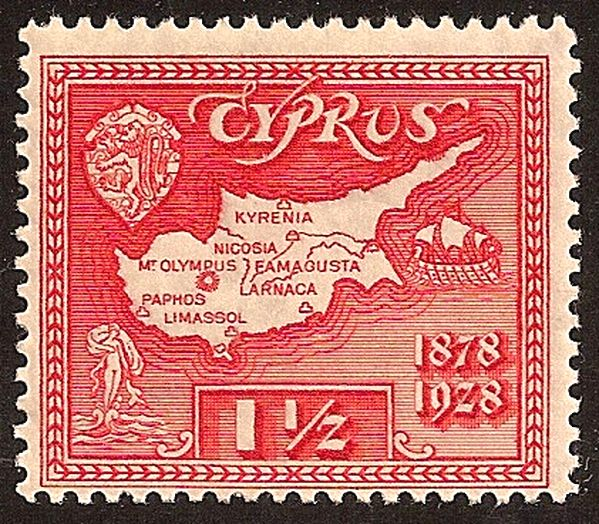
Stamp marking 50 Years of Cyprus under British rule in 1928

== Independence ==
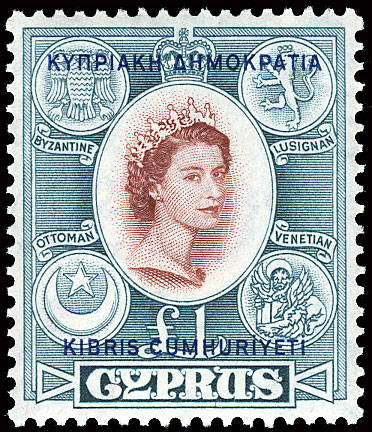
Stamp overprinted Cyprus Republic in Greek and Turkish, 1960

Cyprus was granted independence in 1960. Since 1960, the Cyprus Postal Services have issued stamps in several series per year.

== Postal stationery ==
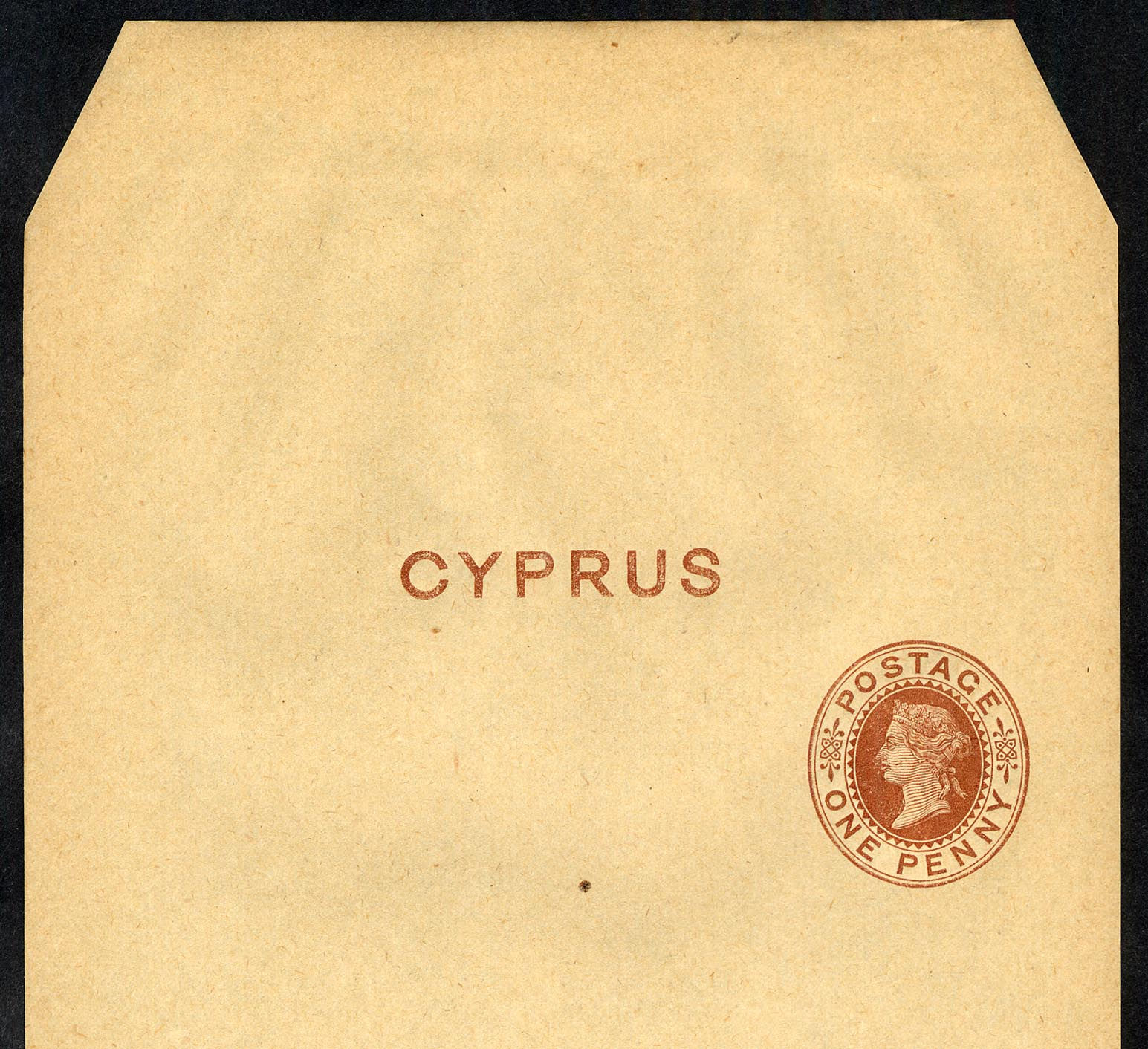
An unused newspaper wrapper for use in Cyprus

British postcards were first used in Cyprus from 1878, examples of such postcards used in Cyprus are very rare. In April 1880 Great Britain postcards overprinted CYPRUS were issued. Postcards with the name Cyprus in the design were first issued in July 1881. With changes in postage rates and the design different postcards continued to be made available to date.

As with postcards British registered envelopes were made available from July 1878, these were followed by Great Britain overprinted registration envelopes in April 1880 and in 1881 registration envelopes with the name Cyprus in the design were issued. In total over 150 different registration envelopes have been issued to date.

The first newspaper wrappers were Great Britain wrapper overprinted CYPRUS and issued in 1880. This wrapper is commonly found mint; only one complete used copy is known. In 1881 the island was supplied with newspaper wrappers with the word Cyprus in the design. Different designs continued to be produced until 1976, after which they were discontinued.

Pre-printed aerogrammes forms (or air letter as they were inscribed), with a 4½ piastre stamp affixed, were first made available in 1944. Aerogrammes with an imprinted stamp were first made available in 1946 and various designs have been produced since that date.

== See also ==
- Postage stamps and postal history of Northern Cyprus
- Revenue stamps of Cyprus
