= Cyprus Turkish National Union =

Defunct political party in Cyprus

The Cyprus Turkish National Union (Turkish: Kıbrıs Milli Türk Birliği, KMTB) was a conservative political party representing the Turkish minority in Cyprus led by Fazıl Küçük.

== History ==
The KMTB was established in 1955 as a successor to the Cyprus is Turkish Party, which had also been established by Küçük. In the pre-independence elections in 1960 it won all 15 Turkish seats in the House of Representatives and all the seats in the Turkish Communal Chamber. The party had run opposed in the House seats in Nicosia, Kyrenia and Larnaca.

In 1963 its MPs withdrew from parliament following the outbreak of intercommunal violence, but continued to legislate for the Turkish Cypriot population. In 1973 the party was dissolved and most of its members were involved in founding new political parties in the territory of Northern Cyprus.

== Ideology ==
The party's primary objective was the protection of the civil rights of Turkish Cypriots. Prior to independence in 1960, it advocated partition of the island, known in Turkish as Taksim. After independence was granted, it then supported the London and Zurich Agreements for power sharing in the country.
