= Sovereign base =

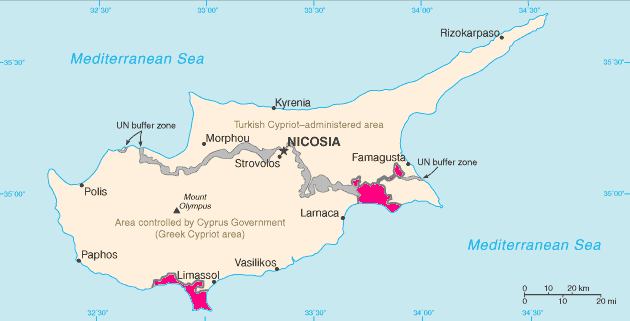

Sovereign bases are exclaves under the full sovereignty of a remote state, typically established through treaties, for the purpose of securely maintaining military installations outside the state's main national territory.

The term sovereign base is not a formal category in international law with the only extant sovereign bases being Akrotiri and Dhekelia in Cyprus. These military bases retained British sovereignty in 1960.

American sovereign bases have been suggested as a part of the solution to the Greenland crisis, dispensing with the need to ask permission from Denmark although there are concerns that this is not a stable solution. Other overseas military installations have been compared to sovereign bases, such as Guantanamo Bay, Mayotte and Diego Garcia.

== See also ==
- Extraterritoriality
- Status of forces agreement
- British Overseas Territories

== Sources ==
- Donaldson, Maggy (16 September 2016). "France's Indian Ocean prize". Le Monde diplomatique. Le Monde diplomatique.
- Harding, Thomas (22 January 2026). "Cyprus-style deal for US airbases in Greenland could solve annexation row". The National.
- Jakes, Lara (21 January 2026). "Trump Says He Has Framework for Greenland Deal as NATO Mulls Idea of U.S. Sovereignty Over Bases". The New York Times.
- Hadjigeorgiou, Nasia (2021). "Sovereign Base Areas (SBA)". Oxford Encyclopedia of Public International Law. Oxford University Press.
- Lilley, Peter (25 November 2025). "Diego Garcia Military Base and British Indian Ocean Territory Bill – Committee (2nd Day): Amendments 20L, 20S, 20T, and 63". Peter Lilley MP. Peter Lilley. "The most compelling comparison is ... between what we are doing now and the reasons given for doing it and the independence of Cyprus, where we severed off the sovereign bases."
- Loucaides, Darren (1 May 2017). "Why are there still British military bases in Cyprus?". New Internationalist. New Internationalist. "Arguably, the only other territory with a comparable status is the US base at Guantánamo Bay in Cuba."
- Stringer, Connor (21 January 2026). "Revealed: Trump's Greenland deal". The Telegraph. Telegraph Media Group.
- Weller, Marc (23 January 2026). "If Trump's 'framework' Greenland agreement relies on creating 'sovereign' bases, it would bring long-term legal issues". Chatham House. Royal Institute of International Affairs.
