= Revenue stamps of Cyprus =

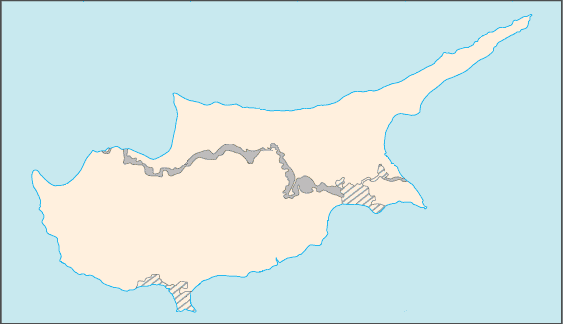
Map of Cyprus

The island of Cyprus first issued revenue stamps in 1878 and continues to do so to this day. The Turkish Republic of Northern Cyprus also issues its own revenue stamps.

== Revenue (1878–present) ==
The first Cypriot revenue stamps were issued in 1878. The first issue consisted of Queen Victoria keytypes overprinted CYPRUS at foot. Some of the shilling values of this issue were reprinted with a different watermark in 1881, and a new design denominated in piastres was issued in 1883. Three years later, some values from the first issue were overprinted with new values in piastres, and these provisionals are quite rare. The last Queen Victoria issue was in 1898, when British unappropriated keytypes were overprinted CYPRUS and the value.

In 1903, a new set was issued, with values in piastres and shillings. The piastre values were similar to the Queen Victoria 1883 issue but with the portrait of King Edward VII. The shilling values were once again British keytypes overprinted for use in Cyprus. The piastre values were reprinted a year later with a different watermark. Between 1912 and 1918, a new set portraying King George V was issued, and in 1921 some values were reprinted using a different watermark. From 1924 onwards, postage stamps were used for fiscal purposes, and therefore there were no revenues portraying King George VI and Queen Elizabeth II.

When Cyprus became independent in 1960, general duty revenues were reintroduced. A set denominated in milliemes was issued, and in 1977 two of these values were surcharged with new values. Between 1983 and 1995 this set was reissued but denominated in the Cypriot pound. Between 1986 and 2001, some of these stamps were issued overprinted with the date of issue. With the adoption of the euro currency in 2008, a new set was issued bearing the coat of arms in hologram, and this consisted of nine values ranging from 7 eurocents to €34.10.

== Postal surcharge (1882–1883) ==
Postal Surcharge stamps were created to fulfil accounting requirements between the GPO at Larnaca and the other post offices on Cyprus. The first issue consisted of contemporary revenues as well as postage stamps with a manuscript JAB. These letters were the initials of the Larnaca postmaster Mr. J. A. Bulmer. In 1883 postage stamps were issued with the initials of the postmaster as well as a handstamp reading POSTAL SURCHARGE, and later with the handstamp only without the initials. Later that year revenues were also issued with this handstamp. From 1883 to 1885 normal revenues were used for postal surcharge purposes, and these can be identified by the Larnaca postmark as well as the initials of George Rigg Hunter (GRH), Basilio John Kipaldes (BJK), Antoine William Caruana (AWC) or Diodato Zirigovich (DZ).

== Penalty (1960–1999) ==
Some values from the 1960 and 1995 revenue issues exist overprinted in Greek, Turkish and English for use as penalty stamps. These were used to pay the tax on documents filed late or insufficiently stamped.

== Social insurance (1956–1970) ==
In 1956, a small design with an olive branch was issued for use as social insurance stamps. This was overprinted when Cyprus became a republic in 1960, and later that year the same design but with bilingual inscriptions was issued. This design continued to be used until about 1970.

== Other revenues ==
Cyprus also had impressed duty stamps, which were British colourless embossed imprints on documents, overprinted CYPRUS. in black.

== See also ==
- Postage stamps and postal history of Cyprus
- Revenue stamps of Northern Cyprus
