= Ayla Halit Kazım =

Turkish Cypriot politician

Member of the House of Representatives
- In office October–December 1963
- Constituency: Paphos

Personal details
- Born: 1934 (age 90–91); Larnaca, Cyprus

Ayla Halit Kazım (born 1934) is a Turkish Cypriot former politician. She was the first female member of the House of Representatives of Cyprus, serving briefly in the legislature in 1963.

== Biography ==
Kazım was born in Larnaca in 1934, the daughter of Mehmet Zeki Müderisoğlu from Larnaca and Nezihe Efendi from Limassol. She grew up in Limassol, and attended the American Academy in Larnaca. In 1953 she married Shemshedin Halit Kazım and became a farmer. The couple settled in Paphos and had four children.

Shemshedin became the Turkish mayor of Paphos, and in 1960 was elected to the House of Representatives. However, he died in a car accident in September 1963. Ayla was chosen to replace him and was elected without a by-election. She took office as the first female member on 25 October. She joined the Independent Turkish Group, but alongside the other 14 Turkish Cypriot members, she withdrew from the House in December. She had only attended two sittings of parliament and never received the salary due to representatives.

Following the 1974 coup and Turkish invasion, Kazım moved to what became Northern Cyprus, settling in Güzelyurt. She subsequently became a member of the Community Assembly of the Autonomous Turkish Cypriot Administration. In 2006 she won a court case entitling her to compensation from the Cypriot government, which had expropriated land she owned in Mandria.
