= London and Zürich Agreements =

1959 agreements between the UK, Turkey, Greece, and Cyprus

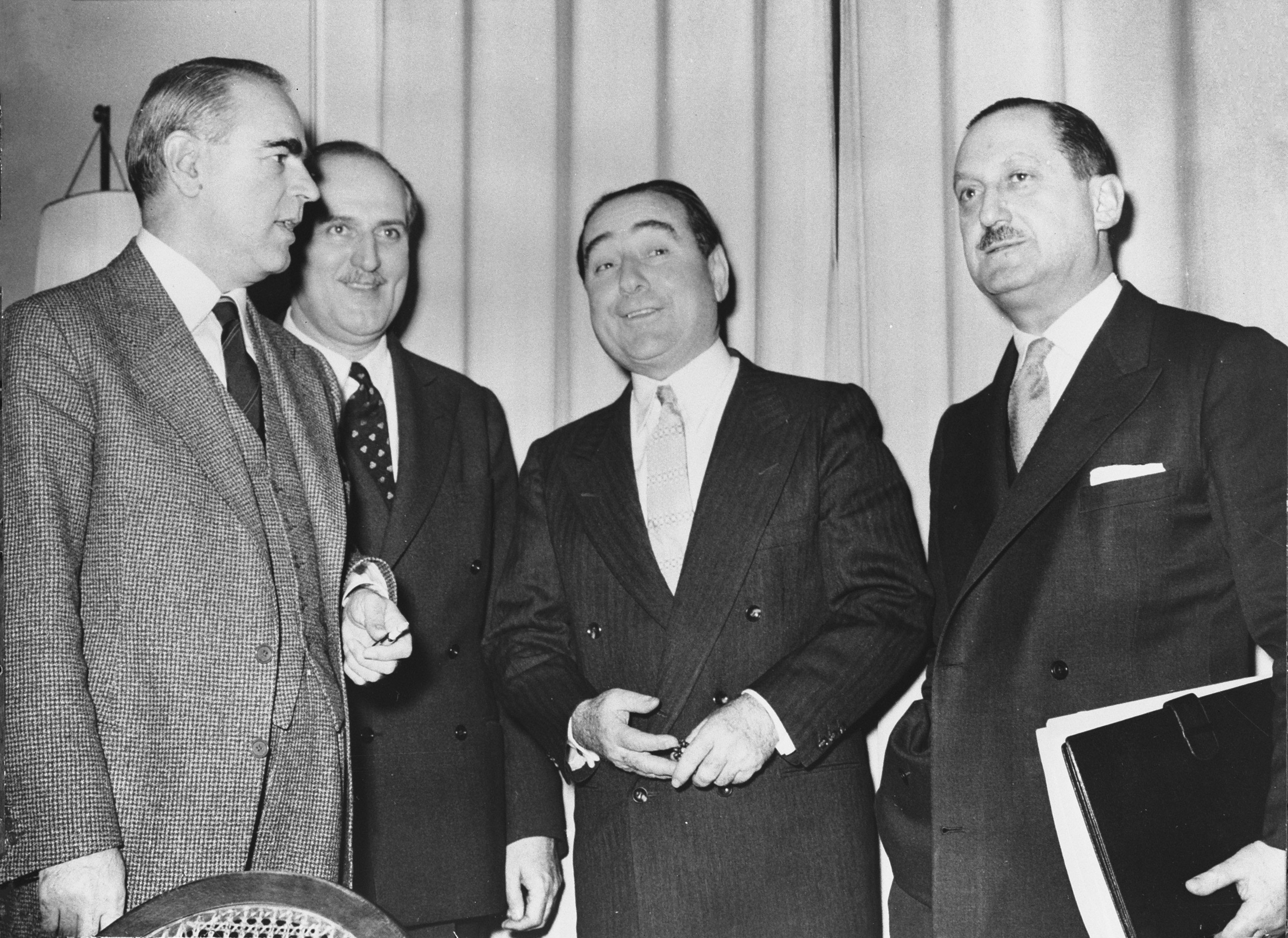
From left to right: Greek Prime Minister Karamanlis, Turkish Minister of Foreign Affairs Zorlu, Turkish Prime Minister Menderes and Greek Minister of Foreign Affairs Averoff at the negotiations in Zürich, Switzerland

The London and Zürich Agreements (Greek: Συμφωνίες Ζυρίχης–Λονδίνου; Turkish: Zürih ve Londra Antlaşmaları) for the constitution of Cyprus started with an agreement on 19 February 1959 in Lancaster House, London, between Turkey, Greece, the United Kingdom and Cypriot community leaders (Archbishop Makarios III for Greek Cypriots and Dr. Fazıl Küçük for Turkish Cypriots). On that basis, a constitution was drafted and agreed together with two prior Treaties of Alliance and Guarantee in Zürich on 11 February 1959.

Cyprus was accordingly proclaimed an independent state on 16 August 1960.

After the failure of the agreement in 1963 and the de facto military partition of Cyprus into Greek-Cypriot and Turkish-Cypriot regions, the official Republic of Cyprus, controlled by the Cypriot government, claims that the 1960 constitution basically remains in force, but the Turkish-Cypriot region claims to have seceded by the Declaration of Independence of the Turkish Republic of Northern Cyprus in 1983, which was declared legally invalid by the UN. The TRNC is recognised only by Turkey.

== Constitutional provisions ==
The constitution, provided for under the agreements, divided the Cypriot people into two communities, based on ethnic origin. The president was to be a Greek-Cypriot, elected by the Greek-Cypriots, and the vice-president a Turkish-Cypriot, elected by the Turkish-Cypriots. The Vice-President was granted the right of a final veto on laws passed by the House of Representatives and on decisions of the Council of Ministers, which was composed of ten ministers, three of whom were to be Turkish-Cypriots, nominated by the Vice-President.

In the House of Representatives, Turkish Cypriots were elected separately by their own community. The House had no power to modify the basic articles of the Constitution in any respect, and any other modification required separate majorities of two thirds of both the Greek Cypriot and the Turkish Cypriot members. Any modification of the Electoral Law and the adoption of any law relating to municipalities or any fiscal laws required separate simple majorities of the Greek Cypriot and Turkish Cypriot members of the House. It was thus impossible for only representatives of one community to pass such a bill.

== Aftermath ==
The United Nations Mediator on Cyprus, Dr. Galo Plaza, described the 1960 constitution created by the Zürich and London Agreements as "a constitutional oddity" and that difficulties in implementing the treaties signed on the basis of those agreements had begun almost immediately after independence.

Within three years, the functioning of the legislature started to fail, and, in 1963, when the fiscal laws under Article 78 of the constitution expired, the House of Representatives split along pure communal lines and failed to renew the income tax upon which public finances depended.

In November 1963, the (Greek-Cypriot) President of the Republic, Archbishop Makarios III, suggested amendments to the constitution "to resolve constitutional deadlocks". The Turkish-Cypriot leadership, following the Turkish government, called them unacceptable. The vice-president publicly declared that the Republic of Cyprus had ceased to exist and, along with the three Turkish-Cypriot ministers, the Turkish-Cypriot members of the house withdrew, as did Turkish-Cypriot civil servants. Makarios refused all suggestions that would have resulted in the partition of Cyprus, and negotiations over the problem have still failed to succeed.

De facto, Cyprus has remained partitioned for over 60 years.

== Treaties of Guarantee and of Alliance ==
Together with the Zürich and London Agreements, two other treaties were also agreed upon in Zürich.

The Treaty of Guarantee was designed to preserve bi-communal consociationalism and independent state of the Republic of Cyprus. Cyprus and the guarantor powers (the United Kingdom, Turkey and Greece) promised to prohibit the promotion of "either the union of the Republic of Cyprus with any other State, or the partition of the Island".

Article Four of the Treaty of Guarantee provided, "In so far as common or concerted action may not prove possible, each of the three guaranteeing Powers reserves the right to take action with the sole aim of re-establishing the state of affairs [i.e. bi-communal consociational state] created by the present Treaty".

In July 1974, there was briefly a Greek-backed coup d'état in Cyprus. Turkey claimed under the Treaty of Guarantee to intervene militarily. The legality of the invasion depends on whether common or concerted action between the United Kingdom, Greece and Turkey had proved impossible and whether the outcome of the invasion safeguarded the bi-communal consociational, independence, sovereignty and territorial integrity of the Republic of Cyprus. In 1983, Turkish Cypriots issued the Declaration of Independence of the Turkish Republic of Northern Cyprus, but it has been recognised only by Turkey. The United Nations declared the Turkish Republic of Northern Cyprus to be legally invalid and asked for its withdrawal. The UN Security Council has issued multiple resolutions that all states should refrain from recognising the protectorate of Turkey in Cyprus.

Greece, Turkey, and Cyprus also signed a Treaty of Alliance.
