= United Nations Security Council Resolution 541 =

UN Security Council Resolution 541
- Northern Cyprus
- Date: 18 November 1983
- Meeting no.: 2,500
- Code: S/RES/541 (Document)
- Subject: Northern Cyprus
- Voting summary: 13 voted for; 1 voted against; 1 abstained
- Result: Adopted

Security Council composition
- Permanent members: China; France; Soviet Union; United Kingdom; United States
- Non-permanent members: Guyana; Jordan; Malta; Netherlands; Nicaragua; Pakistan; Poland; Togo; Zaire; Zimbabwe

Northern Cyprus declared its independence in 1983 with its official name being the Turkish Republic of Northern Cyprus (TRNC). It is recognized only by Turkey.

With United Nations Security Council resolution 541, adopted on 18 November 1983, after reaffirming Resolution 365 (1974) and Resolution 367 (1975), the Council considered Northern Cyprus' decision to declare independence legally invalid.

It called upon both parties to cooperate with the Secretary-General, and urged other Member States not to recognize Northern Cyprus, while only recognizing the Republic of Cyprus as the sole authority on the island.

The resolution was adopted by 13 votes to one against (Pakistan) and one abstention from Jordan.

== Hellenic Republic v. Council of the European Communities ==
On 04.08.1986, Greece filed a case against the Council of the European Communities (supporting intervener: Commission of the European Communities). In the case, Greece first argued that the UN Security Council Resolution 1983/541 called "upon all States not to recognize any Cypriot State other than the Republic of Cyprus". Greece then reasoned that since the Turkish Government recognized the Turkish Republic of Northern Cyprus, the European Community "cannot grant it the special aid without ignoring that breach and thereby itself violating an obligation imposed on it under a measure which is binding on it by virtue of the principle of substitution."

On 25.05.1988, Council of the European Communities (supporting intervener: Commission of the European Communities) specified that the UN Security Council Resolution 1983/541 which is not passed under Article VII of the UN Charter is non-binding in nature, and Council of EC and the Commission of the EC stated that "It is manifest from the wording of the operative part and from the debates and the declarations of vote prior to the adoption of Resolution No 541 that the Resolution does not constitute a "decision" and is therefore not a binding measure, but a measure in the nature of a mere recommendation. Consequently, the States to which the declaration is addressed are NOT bound to comply with paragraph 7 of the resolution or to infer from the fact that paragraph 7 was not complied with the consequences which Greece claims they should infer."

On 27.09.1988, the European Court of Justice (ECJ) rejected all of the Greece's arguments in the Case 204/86 (Greek Republic v. Council of the European Communities (supporting intervener: Commission of the European Communities). Since Greece lost the case, the ECJ ordered Greece to pay the court costs (including the costs of the intervener), per the rules of procedure of the ECJ. The ECJ stated (in prg28) that the Resolution 1983/541 of the United Nations Security Council is completely extraneous to relations between the Community and Turkey.

== See also ==
- Two-state solution (Cyprus)
- Cyprus dispute
- List of United Nations Security Council Resolutions 501 to 600 (1982–1987)
- United Nations Buffer Zone in Cyprus
- Turkish invasion of Cyprus
- United Nations Security Council Resolution 550
