= Ioannis Clerides =

Greek Cypriot lawyer and politician

Ioannis Clerides, CBE, QC (Greek: Ιωάννης Κληρίδης, 1887–17 January 1961), sometimes known as John Clerides, was a Greek Cypriot lawyer and politician. He served as Mayor of Nicosia and was a candidate for president in Cyprus' first presidential election in 1959, where he was defeated by Archbishop Makarios III. He was the father of future President of Cyprus Glafcos Clerides.

== Early life ==
Ioannis Clerides was born in 1887 in Agros, in the region of Pitsilia but he grew up in Nicosia. In 1907 he graduated from the Pancyprian Teachers Training school and worked as a schoolteacher for a few years before moving to London to study Law. He was called to the bar at Gray's Inn in 1914.

== Career ==
He became a prominent Nicosia lawyer, and wrote on political and legal affairs at the newspapers Patris and Eleftheria. Active on the struggle for Enosis, the union of Cyprus to mainland Greece, he served as secretary of the National Council (1921), member of the Archbishop's Throne Committee (1927–41), and of the Nicosia Greek Schools Board. Legal adviser to the archbishop for many years.

He served a single term as Mayor of Nicosia from 1946 to 1949, supported by the left-wing AKEL. In 1952 he became a member of the Colony's Executive Council (under the British colonial government) but resigned in 1956, protesting the deportation of Archbishop Makarios III to the Seychelles.

In 1959 he was a candidate for president in Cyprus' first presidential election in 1959, with the support of AKEL, but was defeated by Archbishop Makarios III. Notably, his own son, Glafcos Clerides, supported Makarios over his father.

He was appointed Queen's Counsel (QC) and Commander of the Most Excellent Order of the British Empire (CBE) by the British government.

== Death ==
Ioannis Clerides died in 1961, aged 74.
