= Vice President of Cyprus =

Political position in Cyprus

The vice president of Cyprus is the second highest political position in Cyprus, after the president. Under the power-sharing Constitution of Cyprus, the vice presidency is reserved for a Turkish Cypriot, while the presidency conversely is reserved for a Greek Cypriot. However, ever since the 1974 Turkish invasion of Cyprus effectively created a separate Turkish Cypriot state, the position has been vacant, with the president of the Cypriot House of Representatives becoming the second-in-command.

== History ==
The Republic of Cyprus was established in 1960 after independence was achieved from British colonial rule, and its constitution came into force that shared power between the two major ethnic groups on the island, as established under the London and Zürich Agreements.

Fazıl Küçük became the first vice president of the country, running unopposed in the 1959 election and winning reelection in the 1968. Rauf Denktaş ran unopposed in the 1973 election, becoming the second vice president.

The vice president appoints three ministers to the cabinet, yet due to disagreements amidst intercommunal violence, such appointments were not made and Turkish Cypriots have not participated in the government since December 1963.

Vice president Denktaş, along with President Makarios III, was deposed via coup d'état by a Greek nationalist junta backed by Greece. Turkey responded by invading the island. Makarios III was restored upon the collapse of the military junta, but Turkish troops refused to leave the island. Later they would establish the Turkish Republic of Northern Cyprus, with Denktaş as its president. Greek Cypriots fled south and Turkish Cypriots fled north. The island remains divided to this day, despite the United Nations and the international community urging an end to what is considered the Turkish occupation, and urging the restoration of the recognised borders of Cyprus.

== List of officeholders ==
History of the office holders follows.

№	Portrait	Name (Birth–Death)	Term of office		Elected	President (Birth–Death)
№	Portrait	Name (Birth–Death)	Inaugurated	Left office	Elected	President (Birth–Death)
1		Fazıl Küçük (1906–1984)	16 August 1960	18 February 1973	1959; 1968	Makarios III (1913–1977)
2		Rauf Denktaş (1924–2012)	18 February 1973	15 July 1974 (deposed)	1973	Makarios III (1913–1977)
Vacant (July 15, 1974–present); de facto superseded as the political leader of the Turkish Cypriot community by the President of Northern Cyprus and with the President of the Cypriot House of Representatives becoming the de facto second-in-command to the President.

== See also ==
- The Annan Plan, which proposed that there should be a president and vice president, one Greek Cypriot and one Turkish Cypriot, rotating posts every 10 months during a five-year term.
