= United Nations Security Council Resolution 367 =

UN Security Council Resolution 367
- The Turkish Republic of Northern Cyprus (highlighted)
- Date: 12 March 1975
- Meeting no.: 1,820
- Code: S/RES/367 (Document)
- Subject: Cyprus
- Voting summary: 15 voted for; None voted against; None abstained
- Result: Adopted

Security Council composition
- Permanent members: China; France; Soviet Union; United Kingdom; United States
- Non-permanent members: Byelorussian SSR; Cameroon; Costa Rica; Guyana; Iraq; Italy; Japan; Mauritania; Sweden; Tanzania

United Nations Security Council Resolution 367, adopted on 12 March 1975, called upon all member states to respect the sovereignty, independence, territorial integrity and non-alignment of the Republic of Cyprus. It was adopted after receiving a complaint from the government of the Republic of Cyprus.

The council noted its regret over the unilateral Declaration of Independence of the Turkish Republic of Northern Cyprus by the Turkish Federated State, though it did not wish to prejudge the final political settlement of the problem. The resolution then goes on to call for the urgent and effective implementation of General Assembly resolution 3212, to request the Secretary-General undertake a new mission to convene the parties and called upon them to co-operate. The council finally called upon all parties concerned to refrain from any action which might jeopardize the negotiations and requested the Secretary-General to keep them informed on the implementation of the resolutions.

The resolution was adopted without vote.

== See also ==
- Cyprus dispute
- List of United Nations Security Council Resolutions 301 to 400 (1971–1976)
- Turkish Invasion of Cyprus
