= Treaty of Alliance (1960) =

1960 treaty between Greece, Turkey, and Cyprus

The 1960 Treaty of Alliance was an international agreement regarding the control and administration of Cyprus. It was signed by the governments of Greece, Turkey and Cyprus in Nicosia in August 1960.

== Terms ==
Cyprus attained independence from the United Kingdom on 16 August 1960 through the Zürich and London Agreement. The Treaty of Alliance was a simultaneous attempt to defuse the dangerous Cyprus dispute between Greece and Turkey.

A major element of the treaty was its specification of the exact number of Greek and Turkish troops that could remain in the new Republic of Cyprus. Small numbers of troops were permitted to provide local defense: Greece was allowed 950 personnel, and Turkey was allowed 650. The treaty also stipulated the formation of a Cypriot National Guard which would include both Greek and Turkish recruits.

A pledge to form a joint military headquarters among Greek, Turkish and Cypriot armed forces was included in the treaty, but the plan was never realised.

The treaty was augmented by the concomitant Treaty of Guarantee (1960), signed by Greece, Turkey and the United Kingdom. The three powers reserved the right to act unilaterally, but the Treaty of Guarantee committed them to consult one another in any Cyprus-related crisis and to attempt to forge a unified course of action.
