= United Nations Security Council Resolution 550 =

United Nations Security Council resolution

UN Security Council Resolution 550
- Northern Cyprus
- Date: 11 May 1984
- Meeting no.: 2,539
- Code: S/RES/550 (Document)
- Subject: Cyprus
- Voting summary: 13 voted for; 1 voted against; 1 abstained
- Result: Adopted

Security Council composition
- Permanent members: China; France; Soviet Union; United Kingdom; United States
- Non-permanent members: Egypt; India; Malta; Netherlands; Nicaragua; Pakistan; Peru; Ukrainian SSR; Upper Volta; Zimbabwe

United Nations Security Council resolution 550, adopted on 11 May 1984, after hearing representations from the Republic of Cyprus and reaffirming resolutions 365 (1974), 367 (1975), 541 (1983) and 544 (1983), the council condemned the illegal secessionist activities in the occupied part of the Republic of Cyprus from Turkey, in violation of the previous resolutions.

The council then called on other member states not to recognise the Turkish Republic of Northern Cyprus (TRNC), condemning the exchange of ambassadors between Turkey and Northern Cyprus and considering all attempts to interfere with the United Nations Peacekeeping Force in Cyprus contrary to Security Council resolutions. The resolution also states that it "considers attempts to settle any part of Varosha by people other than its inhabitants as inadmissible and calls for the transfer of this area to the administration of the United Nations". Finally, the resolution also called for the Secretary-General to promote the implementation of the current resolution.

The resolution was adopted by 13 votes to one against (Pakistan) and one abstention from the United States.

== See also ==
- Two-state solution (Cyprus)
- Cyprus dispute
- List of United Nations Security Council Resolutions 501 to 600 (1982–1987)
- United Nations Buffer Zone in Cyprus
- Turkish invasion of Cyprus
