= Communal Chambers =

Two parallel legislative bodies in Cyprus

The Communal Chambers were two parallel legislative bodies in Cyprus; one for the Greek Cypriot community and one for the Turkish Cypriot community. The Greek Chamber was abolished in 1965.

== History ==
The Chambers were established under the 1960 constitution, with the first elections held on 7 August 1960. The Patriotic Front won a large majority in the Greek chamber and the Cyprus Turkish National Union won all the seats in the Turkish chamber.

Following the withdrawal of the Turkish community from national politics in December 1963, in March 1965 the remaining Greek members of the House of Representatives passed a law abolishing the Greek Communal Chamber and transferring its responsibilities to the House of Representatives. A new Ministry of Education and Culture was established to take responsibility for educational and cultural issues.

In 1967 members of the Turkish chamber joined with the 15 Turkish former members of the House of Representatives to establish a new Turkish Cypriot Legislative Assembly. The chamber was never officially dissolved, although its powers have not been exercised in the Republic of Cyprus since the 1974 division of the island.

== Powers ==
Article 87 of the constitution outlined the responsibilities of the chambers:

(a) all religious matters;
(b) all educational, cultural and teaching matters;
(c) personal status;
(d) the composition and instances of courts dealing with civil disputes relating to personal status and to religious matters;
(e) in matters where the interests and institutions are of purely communal nature such as charitable and sporting foundations, bodies and associations created for the purpose of promoting the well-being of their respective Community;
(f) imposition of personal taxes and fees on members of their respective Community in order to provide for their respective needs and for the needs of bodies and institutions under their control
(g) in matters where subsidiary legislation in the form of regulations or bye-laws within the framework of the laws relating to municipalities will be necessary to enable a Communal Chamber to promote the aims pursued by municipalities composed solely of members of its respective Community;

(h) in matters relating to the exercise of the authority of control of producers' and consumers' co-operatives and credit establishments and of supervision in their functions of municipalities consisting solely of their respective Community, vested in them by this Constitution
