= George Eden Kirk =

Professor of history at the University of Massachusetts

- Born: 3 February 1911; Mansfield, Nottinghamshire, England
- Died: 18 February 1993 (aged 82); Amherst, Massachusetts, US
- Education: Queens' College, Cambridge
- Occupations: Professor emeritus, University of Massachusetts at Amherst
- Known for: A Short History of the Middle East (1948)

George Eden Kirk (3 February 1911 – 18 February 1993) was professor emeritus of history at the University of Massachusetts and an authority on the history and politics of the Middle East.

Born in England, he graduated from the University of Cambridge before serving in intelligence with the British Army in the Middle East during the Second World War. He taught there after the war before holding a number of academic positions during which he produced A Short History of the Middle East in 1948 which received seven editions.

In 1957, he joined Harvard University where he produced his last book: the opinionated Contemporary Arab Politics: A Concise History (1961). He joined the University of Massachusetts at Amherst in 1966 where he taught ancient history. His obituary writer described him as sometimes seen by both Arab and Israeli as a polemicist and he admitted that some of his writing would be found "prejudiced, overstated, and tendentious" but he hoped that it would provoke others to provide their own interpretations.

== Early life and education ==
George Kirk was born in Mansfield, Nottinghamshire, on 3 February 1911. He earned his BA in classics from Queens' College, University of Cambridge, and in the late 1930s travelled to the Middle East with the objective of becoming an epigrapher. He produced a number of articles for the Palestine Exploration Quarterly but his archaeological activities were interrupted by the outbreak of the Second World War in which he served in the British Army in the Middle East as an intelligence officer.

== Career ==
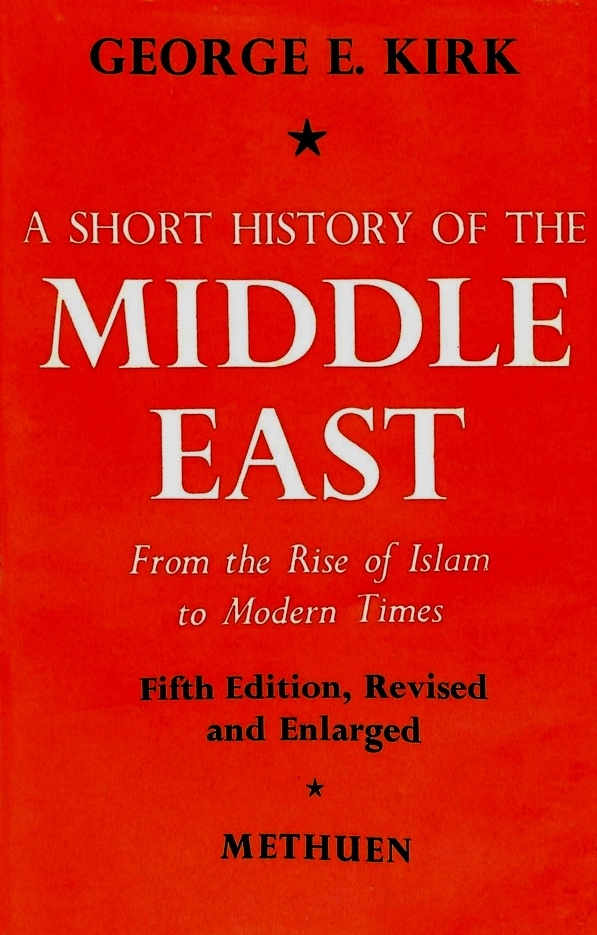
A Short History of the Middle East. Fifth edition, Methuen, 1959.

After the end of the war, Kirk taught at the Middle East Centre for Arab Studies in Jerusalem which had been established by the British Army and was known for its connections to the British security services. It was there that he wrote his first book, A Short History of the Middle East: From the rise of Islam to modern times, which was published by Methuen in London in 1948 and which received seven editions. The first edition was praised by Hans Kohn in The Western Political Quarterly for excelling in "impartial objectivity" in an area known for the strong emotions it evoked.

He subsequently worked for the Royal Institute for International Affairs before joining the American University of Beirut in 1954 and Harvard University in 1957 where he produced his final book, Contemporary Arab Politics (1961). It was criticised in review by Caesar E. Farah for bias against anti-British leaders, a failure to give the Arabs credit for their own actions, and a pervading tone of bitterness about the fading of British influence in the Middle East from the time of the Suez Crisis which Kirk saw as a betrayal by the United States of their British allies. Hussein K. Selim in The Middle East Journal was forced to agree with the author's self-assessment in the introduction that some readers would find parts of the book "prejudiced, overstated, and tendentious" but disagreed with Kirk's claim that such an approach was worthwhile if it provoked others to publish their counter-views. Selim described the book as failing to "demonstrate cause and effect, or to elucidate basic factors or principles" which was combined with a "theme-song" of "intemperate condemnation" of Arab aspirations as based on a grandiose and false reading of their own past, and an unwillingness to accept that there was an Arab point of view.

Kirk became a professor at the University of Massachusetts at Amherst in 1966 where he taught ancient history and ended his career as professor emeritus. He enjoyed hiking and was a long-standing member of the Appalachian Mountain Club.

== Death ==
Kirk died in Amherst on 18 February 1993 after suffering from cancer. He received an obituary from his former student Arthur Goldschmidt Jr. in the Middle East Studies Association Bulletin who described him as a person of strong views, sometimes seen by both Arab and Israeli as a polemicist, but able to accept a contrary opinion if it was supported by facts and a strong argument.

== Selected publications ==
=== Articles ===
- "Archaeological Exploration in the Southern Desert", Palestine Exploration Quarterly, Vol. 70 (1938), No. 4, pp. 211–235.
- "The Era of Diocletian in Palestinian Inscriptions", Journal of the Palestine Oriental Society, Vol. 18 (1938), pp. 161–166.
- "Early Christian Gravestone-Formulae of Southern Palestine", Palestine Exploration Quarterly, Vol. 71 (1939), No. 4, pp. 181–186.
- "The Negev, or Southern Desert of Palestine", Palestine Exploration Quarterly, Vol. 73 (1941), No. 2, pp. 57–71.

=== Books ===
- A Short History of the Middle East: From the rise of Islam to modern times. Methuen, London, 1948.
- The Middle East in the War. Oxford University Press, London, 1952.
- Survey of International Affairs: 1939-1946. Royal Institute of International Affairs, 1952.
- The Middle East, 1945-1950. Oxford University Press, London, 1954.
- Contemporary Arab Politics: A Concise History. Methuen, London, 1961.
