= Constitution of Cyprus =

National constitution of the Republic of Cyprus

Constitution of the Republic of Cyprus
- Ratified: August 16, 1960
- System: Presidential republic

Government structure
- Branches: Three (Executive, Legislative, Judiciary)
- Head of state: Executive President, reserved for Greeks a Vice Presidential office, reserved for Turks and vested with complementary powers to those of the President is provided for, but dormant owing to failure of the Greek-Turk power-sharing framework.
- Chambers: One: House of Representatives
- Executive: Cabinet headed by the President
- Judiciary: A Supreme Constitutional Court is provided for, though not established owing to failure of the Greek-Turk power-sharing framework.
- Federalism: No; However, a power-sharing system between Greeks and Turks, including separate Communal Chambers for each, is envisioned, but has collapsed following the foundation of the TRNC.
- Entrenchments: 48; Some entrenchments are partial or conditional
- Signatories: Members of the Cypriot government

The Constitution of the Republic of Cyprus (Greek: Σύνταγμα της Κυπριακής Δημοκρατίας) is a document, ratified on August 16, 1960, that serves as the Supreme Law of the Republic of Cyprus (Suprema Lex Cypri) defining the system of government of the Cypriot Republic and the civil liberties for the Cypriot citizens. Cypriot government. It was drafted after the country won its independence in 1959 and is Cyprus's first and only constitution to date. The Constitution of the Republic of Cyprus has been in force for 65 years and it has been amended twenty-two times and 31 Articles of the 199 were modified since 1960. The 21st Amendment concerned Articles 135, 136, 146, 152, 155 (in force since 22.7.2025). 24 of the 199 concerning Communal Autonomy have been suspended in practice since 1964 when the Doctrine of Necessity was introduced.

The Constitution of Cyprus establishes a bicommunal unitary Republic with partial communal autonomy and a Presidential system of government with a Greek-Cypriot President and a Turkish-Cypriot Vice-President, both with extensive veto powers as a means to safeguard the rights of their respective communities.

The constitution put methods in place to protect Turkish Cypriots, due to the restrictions placed in Article 6 of the document. That article ensures the Cypriot government has no right to discriminate against either Turkish or Greek Cypriots. The constitution also ensures, in Article 1, that the Vice-President of the country is a Turk and the President is a Greek. In 1964, however, the Cypriot government became dominated by Greeks.

The constitution of the country collapsed, however, in 1963 due to a dispute between the Greek and Turkish Cypriots. The running of the republic by the Greek community alone has been legally defined in what is called "Justice of need". Following the Turkish invasion of 1974 the state acts as a surrogate for the properties of Turkish Cypriots that moved to the Turkish-occupied north. Following Cyprus's entry into the EU in 2004 and the Ibrahim Aziz vs. Republic of Cyprus case in the European Court of Human Rights, some individual civil rights of Turkish Cypriots residing in the area under the control of the Republic have been restored, thus they can be part of the electoral register and stand in European elections. This, however, has not restored their communal rights as envisaged in the original constitution, i.e. separate electoral register to elect a vice president and a fixed number of members of the house of representatives.

== Constitutional breakdown ==
In 1963, the Constitution broke down as the Turkish Cypriots involved withdrew from the government, and as a result the Greeks took full control of the government in 1965, as the Turkish Cypriots would not co-operate for constitutional changes, despite the constitutional safeguards to ensure representation of Turks that had previously existed.

The separation occurred because the two ethnic groups continued to distrust each other after the constitution was signed. Another issue that caused the breakdown was that President Makarios III, a Greek Cypriot, supported complete integration between the two ethnic groups, while Vice President Fazil Küçük, a Turkish Cypriot, supported increased separation.

In addition, President Makarios proposed a constitutional change that year to remove most of the rights given to Turkish Cypriots. He said that the original constitution prevented the Turks and Greeks from "cooperating in the spirit of understanding and friendship."

== Content ==
=== General provisions ===
The first five articles of the constitution discuss General Provisions.

Article One asserts that Cyprus is an independent republic with a President and that the President and Vice President must be Greeks and Turks respectively. Article three asserts that the official languages of the Republic of Cyprus are Greek and Turkish, and that all officials documents must be published in both languages.

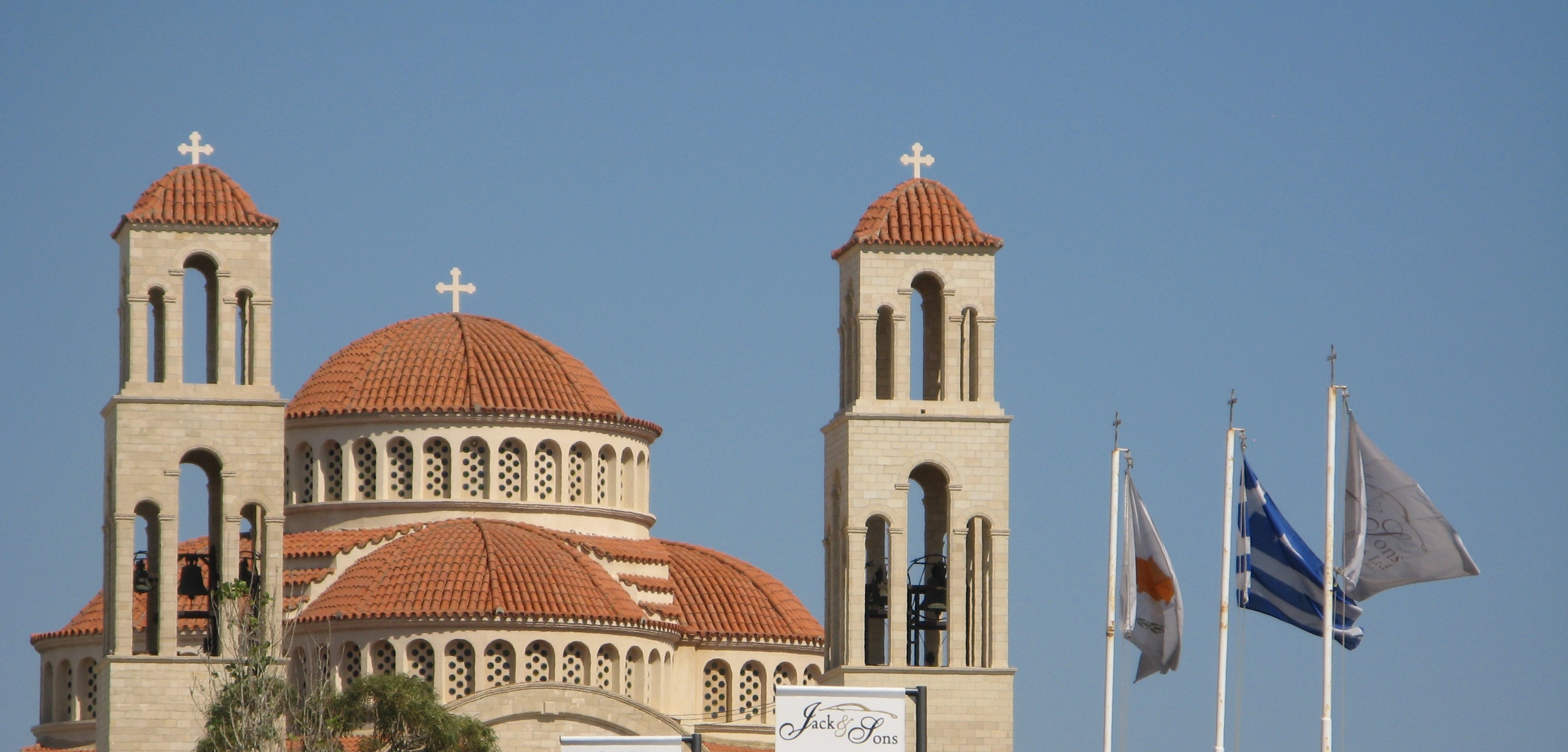
Flags of Greece and Cyprus being flown on flagpoles with cross finials in front of Agioi Anargyroi Church, Pafos.

Article four requires that Cyprus "shall have its own flag of neutral design and colour, chosen jointly by the President and the Vice-President of the Republic," while article five states that Greek and Turkish Cypriots have a right to celebrate their holidays.

=== Fundamental rights and liberties ===
Articles 6–35 of the constitution deal with Fundamental Rights and Liberties.

Article six prohibits the discrimination of either Greek or Turkish Cypriots based on their race, while article seven asserts the right to life and states that an individual may only be deprived of his right to life except for when being sentenced by a "competent court" for an offense which provides the death penalty by law.

Article eight prohibits inhumane or degrading punishment or treatment, and prevents torture, and Article nine states that "every person has the right to a decent existence and to social security."

Article ten prohibits slavery and forced labour, in all cases other than in cases of compulsory military service or work while being imprisoned lawfully by the state. It also allows for "any service exacted in case of an emergency or calamity threatening the life or well-being of the inhabitants."

Article eleven contains several limits on who can be imprisoned. It states that people may only be imprisoned when they have been convicted by a court, detained to force them to appear before a court, detained to prevent them from committing an offense or detained to avoid the spread of diseases. The article also ensures that "every person who has been the victim of arrest or detention in contravention of the provisions of this Article shall have an enforceable right to compensation."

Article 12 ensures that habeas corpus is followed, that no person may be charged twice for the same offense, that the punishment is proportional to the crime, and that people have the right to a defence while in court.

Article thirteen says that any person has the right to move freely around Cyprus, and leave when they wish, subject to "reasonable conditions" imposed by law, while article fourteen states that no person shall be forced to leave the country.

Article fifteen defines the right to privacy, stating that every individual has a right to a private life except when infringing on someone's privacy is in accordance of the law and in the national interest. Article sixteen prohibits entering someone's property without their prior consent, or an arrest warrant, unless you are rescuing the individual from danger. Article seventeen also discusses privacy, with its main focus being an individual's right to privacy in all lawful communication.

Articles 18, 19 and 21 secure freedom of speech, religion and assembly respectively, while articles 20 and 22 deal with the right to free education and marriage.

Article 23 adds to the rights laid out in article sixteen, by allowing citizens of Cyprus to purchase property and receive compensation for any damage to it.

Article 24 requires citizens to pay taxes. It states that "every person is bound to contribute according to his means towards the public burdens." It also states that no organization may collect a tax without permission in a court.

Article 25 ensures that every individual in Cyprus has the right to work, subject to conditions that may be in the law. Article 26 states that people may freely enter into contracts, and avoid be exploited by people with "commanding economic power."

Article 27 states that, subject to conditions in the law, citizens have a right to take part in industrial action. It also states that members of the armed forces, police and gendarmerie are not allowed to strike.

== Bibliography ==
- The Constitution of the Republic of Cyprus in Modern Greek and English-Marios C. Adamides, 2004
- The 10 Amendments of the Cyprus Constitution of 1960 with regard to 20 Articles-Marios C. Adamides-2016
- The Constitution of the Republic of Cyprus of 1960-199 Articles, 3 Appendices, 10 Amendments, 57 years in force-Marios C. Adamides-2017
- The Constitution of the Republic of Cyprus of 1960 in English with Index and Chronology of the 10 Amendments-Marios C. Adamides-2017
- The Constitution of the Republic of Cyprus of 1960 in English with Index and Chronology of the 14 Amendments-Marios C. Adamides-Dec. 2019
- The 22 Amendments of the Constitution of the Republic of Cyprus-September 2026- Marios C. Adamides-Amazon.com
