= Niyazi Manyera =

Cypriot politician

Minister of Health
- In office 16 August 1960 – 23 December 1963
- President: Makarios III
- Succeeded by: Stella Soulioti

Personal details
- Born: 1911 Famagusta, British Cyprus
- Died: 24 October 1999 (aged 87–88) London, England, UK

Niyazi Manyera (1911–1999) was the first minister of health of the 1960 Republic of Cyprus. Manyera was born in 1911 in Famagusta and died on 24 October 1999 in London. After completing his high school studies, he studied medicine in Turkey at the University of Istanbul which he finished in 1939.

Manyera was elected as the Mayor of Famagusta in 1948. Apart from the activity in the City Council, he also worked in the executive committee of the education commission of the Turkish-Cypriot schools and in the executive committee of the Cyprus-Turkish Dock Workers' Union. With his many roles in the service of his community, Manyera engaged himself in the social development of the Turkish-Cypriot community.

After the declaration of independent Republic of Cyprus, he held the position of the Minister of Health from 1963 till 1974 in the administered zones of the Cyprus Turks. After the establishment of the Turkish Republic of Northern Cyprus in 1975, Manyera withdrew from politics.

He was father of Ramiz Manyera, Turkish Cypriot businessperson.
