= Fazıl Küçük =

Turkish Cypriot politician (1906–1984)

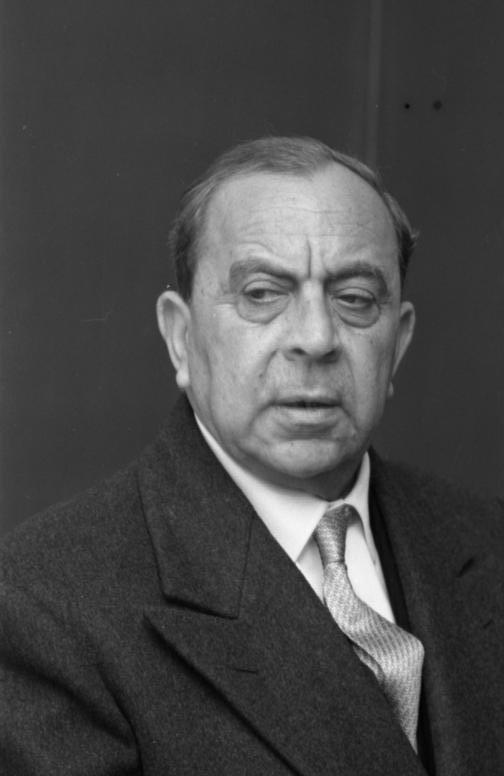
- Küçük in 1973

1st Vice President of the Republic of Cyprus
- In office 16 August 1960 – 18 February 1973
- President: Makarios III
- Preceded by: Office established
- Succeeded by: Rauf Denktaş

Personal details
- Born: 14 March 1906 Nicosia, British Cyprus
- Died: 15 January 1984 (aged 77) London, England
- Party: Turkish Cypriot Party
- Spouse: Süheyla Küçük
- Relatives: İrsen Küçük (nephew)
- Education: University of Lausanne
- Occupation: Politician, journalist

Fazıl Küçük (Turkish: [faːˈzɯl cyˈtʃyc] 14 March 1906 – 15 January 1984) was a Turkish Cypriot politician and a medical doctor who served as the first Vice President of the Republic of Cyprus.

== Biography ==
Fazıl Küçük, the son of a farmer, was born in Nicosia in 1906. After graduating from the Turkish High School in Nicosia, Küçük went on to study medicine at the Universities of Istanbul, Lausanne and Paris. Having returned to Cyprus in 1937, he started a practice, but his interest in politics soon led to him to become a voice for Turkish Cypriot rights. In 1941 Küçük founded the newspaper Halkın Sesi (The Voice of the People) and became the managing editor. Due to his campaign against the British colonial administration, his paper was not given a permit for publication until 1942, the paper is still being published to this day.

In 1943, he became one of the founders of the Kıbrıs Adası Türk Azınlığı Kurumu (Association of the Turkish Minority of the Island of Cyprus – known as KATAK). The aim of the party was to promote the social, economic and political well-being of the Turkish Cypriot people. Due to disagreements with some of its members, Küçük parted with KATAK and established the Kıbrıs Millî Türk Halk Partisi (Cyprus National Turkish People's Party – known as KMTHP). Following a 15-year struggle, Küçük helped secure the transfer of the Evkaf (a Turkish religious fund) from British to Turkish Cypriot control.

During the 1959 London and Zurich Conferences for the creation of an independent Republic of Cyprus, Küçük represented the Turkish Cypriot community and was able to secure constitutional safeguards for the people. On 3 December 1959 Küçük was elected vice president of the new republic. Following Greek Cypriot proposals to modify the constitution (see Cyprus problem), Küçük continued as the vice president of the Republic of Cyprus until 1973 when he was succeeded by Rauf Denktaş. Despite ill health, Küçük continued to support Turkish Cypriots through his Halkın Sesi newspaper.

Küçük died in a Westminster hospital on 15 January 1984, less than a year after the Unilateral declaration of Independence of the Turkish Republic of Northern Cyprus. He was the uncle of former Turkish Republic of Northern Cyprus prime minister, İrsen Küçük.

== See also ==
- Cyprus dispute
- Politics & Elections in TRNC
- Politics of Northern Cyprus
