= Cyprus and the European Union =

Cyprus–European Union relations
- Cyprus: European Union

Cyprus became a full member of the European Union in 2004. Despite being a divided country, the entire island is EU territory. Turkish Cypriots are eligible for EU citizenship, however EU law is suspended in certain areas. Cyprus has two official languages: Greek and Turkish, but only Greek is an official EU language. EU trade accounts for 34% of Cyprus' exports and 59% of imports. Enthusiasm within Cyprus for the EU has waxed and waned over the years, mainly in synchrony with the health of the economy. Since 2019, support is on the upswing, mainly due to heavy investments by the EU in green energy and digital technologies.

== Internal tensions within Cyprus ==
Historically, Cyprus has been a divided nation. With a sharp cultural split between Turkish Cypriots and Greek Cypriots dating back centuries, tensions were deep-rooted on the island. Poor relations continued following the successful Greek Cypriot independence movement from British Imperialism to be free from colonial rule in 1960, forming the "Republic of Cyprus".

Tensions within Cyprus reached new highs after the Greek military junta spilled over into Cyprus in 1974. Relations were further strained by the invasion of Northern Cyprus by Turkish armed forces in response to the Greek seizure of power the same year, leading to a partition of the island. This partition separated Northern Cyprus (officially the Turkish Republic of Northern Cyprus) from the Republic of Cyprus, splitting the capital Nicosia into North and South, alongside the establishment of a UN military buffer zone. Till this day the partition by the Turkish armed forces is seen as illegal by International Law. Additionally, the United Kingdom retained military territory on the island.

== Accession to the European Union ==
=== Nearing accession ===
EU and the 10 new Accession countries (as of 1 May 2004)

Following the dissolution of the Soviet Union, the European Union opened its membership to newly independent states across the eastern bloc. The expansion arose as an opportunity to try and resolve the Cypriot dispute which had left the island partitioned for decades, whilst widening the European Union's sphere of influence towards the eastern Mediterranean.

This process involved the European Union being supported by the United Nations, setting the agenda for the peace process. This was led by United Nations Secretary-General Kofi Annan, who sought an amicable solution that would tend to the needs of both communities through referendums, known as the Annan Plan.

In cooperation with the European Union, United Nations Secretary-General Kofi Annan attempted to solve the issue with a series of referendums that aimed to strike an amicable solution between the two communities. In the end, the referendum received overwhelming support from Turkish Cypriots voting sixty-five per cent in favour. However, the referendum was poorly received by Greek Cypriots voting seventy-four per cent against, still regarding their neighbours as invaders. Regardless of the outcome, the EU proceeded with the accession, which has continued the strain on relations between Greek and Turkish Cypriots. This left Greek Cypriots feeling that their voices were not being heard as the European Union had always planned to accept the entire island of Cyprus, regardless of the referendum result.

Although the internationally unrecognised Turkish Republic of Northern Cyprus is not a member state of the European Union, the entire island is encompassed into the European Union. This is because the entire island of Cyprus is considered to be internationally recognised as de jure territory of the Republic of Cyprus. Cyprus has used its voice to express disagreement of any possible unification with Northern Cypriots alongside relations with Turkey.

In the 1990s, Cyprus president George Vassiliou formally applied for the country's accession to the European Union.

=== Accession to the European Union ===
Accession of Cyprus in EU 2004

In 2004, Cyprus became a full member of the European Union. Being a small, divided island nation, the European Union had represented an attractive solution to Greek Cypriots to act as a safety net against Turkey. In the autumn of 2004, Eurobarometer reported that seventy-three per cent of Cypriots believed that by being a member of the European Union, they felt more secure. Similarly, the identification of the European Union as a space of democratic values and an upholder of human rights significantly contributed to a positive image of Cyprus’ accession. The European Union presented itself as a project worth dedicating Cypriot loyalty to, hence delivering a sense of security and pride where neighboring countries could not threaten their interests. The Treaty of Accession 2003 signed on the 16 April 2003 in Athens was the legal basis for 10 Central and Southern European countries' entering the European Union. On 1 May 2004 Cyprus became a full member of the European Union, along with the following 9 other European countries:

EU Member countries	Date of accession
Cyprus; Czech Republic; Estonia; Hungary; Latvia; Lithuania; Malta; Poland; Slovakia; Slovenia	1 May 2004

== Financial issues ==
=== Euro-Crisis ===
The subprime mortgage crisis in the United States generated a ripple effect that arrived on the shores of the European Union. Having recently acceded to the European Union alongside the eurozone, Cyprus was disproportionately affected, with the economy shrinking by 1.67% in 2009.

On 13 March 2012, problems worsened as Cyprus’ credit rating was downgraded by Moody's to speculative status. Moody's stressed that if the Cypriot government did not inject more fresh capital into its banks to cover losses incurred through Greece's debt swap, the situation would further deteriorate. Similarly, on 25 June 2012, Fitch downgraded bonds issued by Cyprus to BB+, disqualifying them from being accepted as collateral by the European Central Bank; the Cypriot government requested a bailout from the European Financial Stability Facility or the European Stability Mechanism. Having just acceded to the eurozone, and in a significantly weaker position financially than fellow member states, Cyprus’ ability to exercise its voice became slimmer by the day.

=== Bailout ===
Facing dire straits and the possibility of being the first member state to be removed from the eurozone, Cyprus obtained its bailout package. On 16 March 2013, the Eurogroup, European Commission, European Central Bank, and International Monetary Fund (IMF) agreed on a €10 billion deal with Cyprus. As part of the deal, a one-off bank deposit levy of six-point seven per cent for deposits up to €100,000- and nine-point nine per cent for higher deposits, was announced on all domestic bank accounts. Savers were due to be compensated with shares in their banks. Measures were put in place to prevent withdrawal or transfer of money representing the prescribed levy. This meant that customers, most of whom being everyday Cypriots, were being hit hard by high levies footing them with an exorbitant bill.

== Euroscepticism ==
=== Rise in Euroscepticism ===
Cyprus, which had recently become incorporated into the eurozone, was faced with significant economic challenges in the 2012–2013 Cypriot financial crisis. Powerless to challenge the troika, the loyalty of Cyprus to the European Union would be tested in later years, using its voice to express its dismay. This was exemplified by the right of far-left Eurosceptic parties such as ‘Committee for a Radical Left Rally’ and ‘The New Internationalist Left’, who emerged in response to the austerity measures agreed by the Cypriot government (See Annex 2.).

The bailout package generated mixed reactions in Cyprus. Once a strongly pro-EU population, the stringent conditions of the bailout package strained EU-Cypriot relations. Since the 2013 bail-in agreement, socio-economic concerns rose, which were quickly followed by a delegitimization of the EU in Cypriot media. Raising demands for exit among the scorned population. According to a collaboration of ‘my voice does not count in the EU’ Eurobarometer surveys between 2007 and 2019, in 2013 the survey reported that eighty-nine per cent of Cypriots did not feel that their voices were being heard, compared to sixty-seven per cent across the EU. Outside of the Cypriot political sphere, foreign newspapers regarded the bailout package as “unfair, short-sighted and self-defeating”. The Cypriot population had been left frustrated by austerity measures which contributed to the decreasing levels of loyalty towards the European Union. Still it did not strengthen its desire to leave it.

Unlike EU member states who were former soviet satellite states whose Euroscepticism is predominantly right wing; Cypriot Euroscepticism appears to be largely left wing. The 2012–2013 Cypriot financial crisis suggests that Cypriots being placed in a weak position, feeling unable to use their voice to express their discontent with the situation, contributed to the rise of Euroscepticism.

=== Decrease in Euroscepticism ===
The year 2016; when Cyprus exited the troika supervision, marked another turning point with widespread feelings towards the EU gradually becoming more positive. This suggests that Euroscepticism in Cyprus shifts away from ‘hard Euroscepticism’, which focusses on general opposition to the European Project and the functioning of the European Union. Instead, Cypriot Euroscepticism, correlates with ‘soft Euroscepticism’, which explains Euroscepticism as occurring in cycles due to events. This would explain why Euroscepticism decreased in Cyprus whilst it has festered in countries such as Hungary and Poland.

=== Renewal in EU Support ===
In 2019, sharp levels of Euroscepticism that emerged after the 2012–2013 Cypriot financial crisis began to rescind. The spring Eurobarometer reported that support for the European Union had increased by 13%, bringing it to 54% of Cypriots now supporting the European Union. Likewise, despite strong opposition towards the euro following the banking crisis, in 2019, it was reported that eighty-two per cent of Cypriots favoured eurozone participation. In the same year, Cypriot trust in the European Union had quadrupled from thirteen per cent in 2013, to fifty-four per cent in 2019. Despite having faced considerable economic challenges following the 2012–2013 Cypriot financial crisis, Cyprus's decision to stay loyal to the European Union placed them in a more favourable and stronger position having demonstrated their devotion to the project despite hardship.

== Next Generation EU ==
The COVID-19 pandemic presented challenges that Cyprus was not equipped to deal with alone. The economic damage of the COVID-19 recession was cushioned by a state-aid scheme approved by the European Commission in April 2020 to help absorb the shock. Likewise, towards the end of 2020, the union wide procurement of vaccines was facilitated by the European Commission, ensuring that member states (including Cyprus) were guaranteed vaccines in light of the high demand. Lastly, on 17 August 2021, Cypriots would receive over 1 billion euros thanks to the state aid scheme approved by the European Commission, supporting both businesses and those self-employed who had been disproportionately affected by the COVID-19 crisis. Opposed to exiting the Union, as seen during the United Kingdom's decision to leave the European Union in 2016, Cyprus’ decision to remain loyal to the European Union has resulted in it being continuously protected and respected as an equal member of the Union. This sense of belonging has been reflected through a comparison of Cypriots identifying as EU citizens. In 2013, following the adoption of austerity measures, forty-five per cent of Cypriots answered that they considered themselves as EU citizens; this figure has sharply increased in 2022 to seventy-two per cent.

On 8 July 2021, The European Commission adopted a positive assessment of Cyprus' recovery and resilience plan. This saw the EU disbursing a total of €1.2 billion in grants and loans under the Recovery and Resilience Facility. This financing will facilitate the implementation of vital investment and reforms outlined in Cyprus' recovery and resilience plan. This support is paramount as it will help Cyprus recuperate from the COVID-19 pandemic and to emerge more robust than ever before. Notably, this will help improve Cypriot access to renewable energy; currently, Cyprus remains totally isolated from the European energy grid due to its geographical position. Additionally, in 2016, it was reported that Cyprus was suffering from crippling energy poverty, with approximately nineteen per cent not having access to heating systems, and fifteen per cent not having access to cooling systems (See Annex 3.).

The Recovery and Resilience Facility is at the core of NextGenerationEU, providing up to €800 billion (in current prices) to support investments and reforms the EU. The Cypriot plays into the coordinated EU response to the COVID-19 crisis, in facing common European challenges and through adopting progressive green and digital transitions, which over time will strengthen economic and social resilience, and the unity of the Single Market.

The Commission assessed Cyprus' plan based on the criteria set out in the Recovery and Resilience Facility Regulation. The commission's analysis considered whether the investments and reforms set out in Cyprus' plan support the green and digital transitions; contribute to effectively addressing challenges identified in the European Semester; and strengthen its growth potential, job creation, economic and social resilience.

By retaining loyalty to the European Union, Cyprus has been afforded financial support from the European Commission to help Cyprus mitigate the catastrophic impacts of climate change. Likewise, Cyprus’ loyalty to the European Union has driven job growth and will allow Cyprus to innovate and invest in green and digital technologies, further stimulating its economy.

In May 2025 the European Commission designated Johannes Hahn as the new special envoy to work on the dispute settlement process within the framework of the United Nations towards Cypriot reunification. Hahn will act in close cooperation with the United Nations secretary-general’s personal envoy on Cyprus, María Ángela Holguín Cuéllar.

“After so many difficult times, I believe that there is now an opportunity. I will not say it is the last opportunity, but there is an opportunity,” he said. (EU special envoy Johannes Hahn, Dec. 2025)

== Second rotating presidency of the Council of the European Union ==
In the first half of 2026 Cyprus is leading the EU for the first time since 2012. The agenda of the second Cypriot presidency will reflect the strategic agenda adopted by the European Council in 2024 that covers the period through 2029, with the aim of a more autonomous European Union capable of playing a role in global affairs. According to Cypriot President Nikos Christodoulides there will be five main pillars of the Cypriot presidency: Security, competitiveness, enlargement, autonomy and fiscal balance. "An autonomous union, open to the world" is the presidency's motto. The EU presidency plays an important role in EU enlargement: Candidate country Montenegro wants to conclude accession negotiations with the EU in 2026. Also Cyprus is working at joining the NATO Partnership for Peace program.

== Cyprus's foreign relations with EU member states ==
- Austria
- Belgium
- Bulgaria
- Croatia
- Czech Republic
- Denmark
- Estonia
- France
- Germany
- Greece
- Hungary
- (Republic of Ireland) Ireland
- Italy
- Latvia
- Lithuania
- Luxembourg
- Malta
- Netherlands
- Poland
- Portugal
- Romania
- Slovakia
- Slovenia
- Spain
- Sweden

== See also ==
- Foreign relations of Cyprus
- Foreign relations of the European Union
- Cyprus–NATO relations
- Cyprus dispute
- Cyprus–Greece relations
- Schengen Area#Cyprus
