= Cyprus–NATO relations =

Cyprus – NATO relations
- NATO: Cyprus

Map of NATO in Europe: Members of NATO Membership Action Plan Intensified Dialogue / Individual Partnership Action Plan Partnership for Peace Aspiring Partnership for Peace members

NATO member countries Accession protocol signed Countries in the process of accession Countries promised invitations / Membership is not the goal Countries have not announced their membership intentions

Cyprus is one of four European Union (EU) member states which is not a member of the North Atlantic Treaty Organization (NATO), along with Austria, Ireland and Malta, and the only EU member not to participate in NATO's Partnership for Peace (PfP) program.

== History ==
=== 1949–1960: Period within NATO as a British crown colony ===
When NATO was founded in 1949, Cyprus was a crown colony of the United Kingdom and as such the UK's NATO membership also applied to British Cyprus.

In 1955 the Cyprus Emergency began, with Greek Cypriots waging an armed campaign to end British colonial rule and union with Greece. This led to intercommunal violence between Greek and Turkish Cypriots, who opposed a union with Greece and instead fought for partition and partial union with Turkey. The London and Zürich Agreements of 1959 ended the conflict and led to Cyprus gaining its independence from the UK in 1960, but ruled out both a union with either Greece or Turkey and partition. The Sovereign Base Areas of Akrotiri and Dhekelia in Cyprus remained under British control as a British Overseas Territory following the independence of Cyprus.

=== 1960–2004: Independence and non-alignment ===
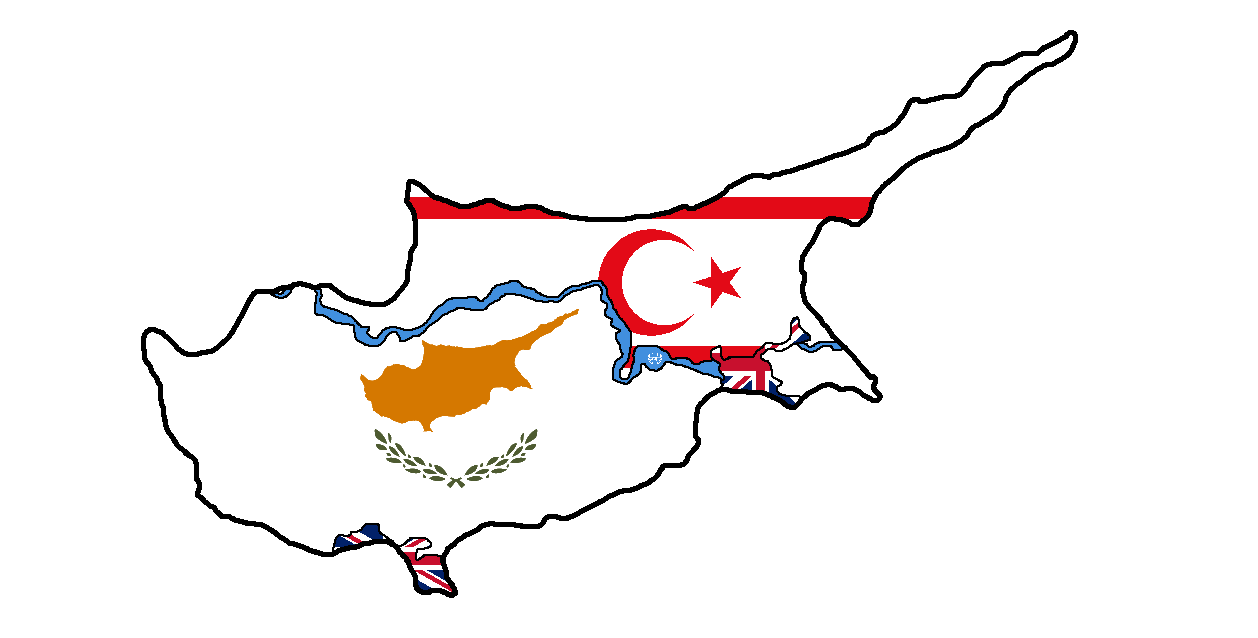
Flag map showing the current division of the island into the Republic of Cyprus, Turkish Republic of Northern Cyprus, United Nations Buffer Zone in Cyprus and the Akrotiri and Dhekelia.

Following its independence, neighbouring Greece and Turkey (both NATO members) competed for influence in Cyprus. The first President of the independent Republic of Cyprus, Archbishop of Cyprus Makarios III, attempted to maintain good relations with both states. While Greece and Turkey had agreed to support Cyprus joining NATO during negotiations for its independence, Makarios adopted a policy of non-alignment. In 1961 he took part in the founding meeting of the Non-Aligned Movement in Belgrade.

In 1974 Greece supported a Cypriot coup d'état, which ousted Makarios and replaced him with Nikos Sampson who aimed to unify the island with Greece. In response, Turkey invaded Cyprus. While Makarios secured international recognition of his administration as the legitimate government of the whole island of Cyprus, Turkey continued to occupy Northern Cyprus. In 1983 the Turkish Republic of Northern Cyprus was established as a separate state, but it has only been recognized by Turkey.

Since the 1974 invasion, the main foreign policy goal of the Republic of Cyprus has been to secure the withdrawal of Turkish forces and the reunification of the island under the most favorable constitutional and territorial terms possible. This campaign has been pursued primarily through international forums such as the United Nations and the Non-Aligned Movement, and in recent years the European Union.

=== 2004–present: European Union membership ===
Accession of Cyprus to the European Union in 2004

Map showing European membership of the EU and NATO EU member only NATO member only member of both

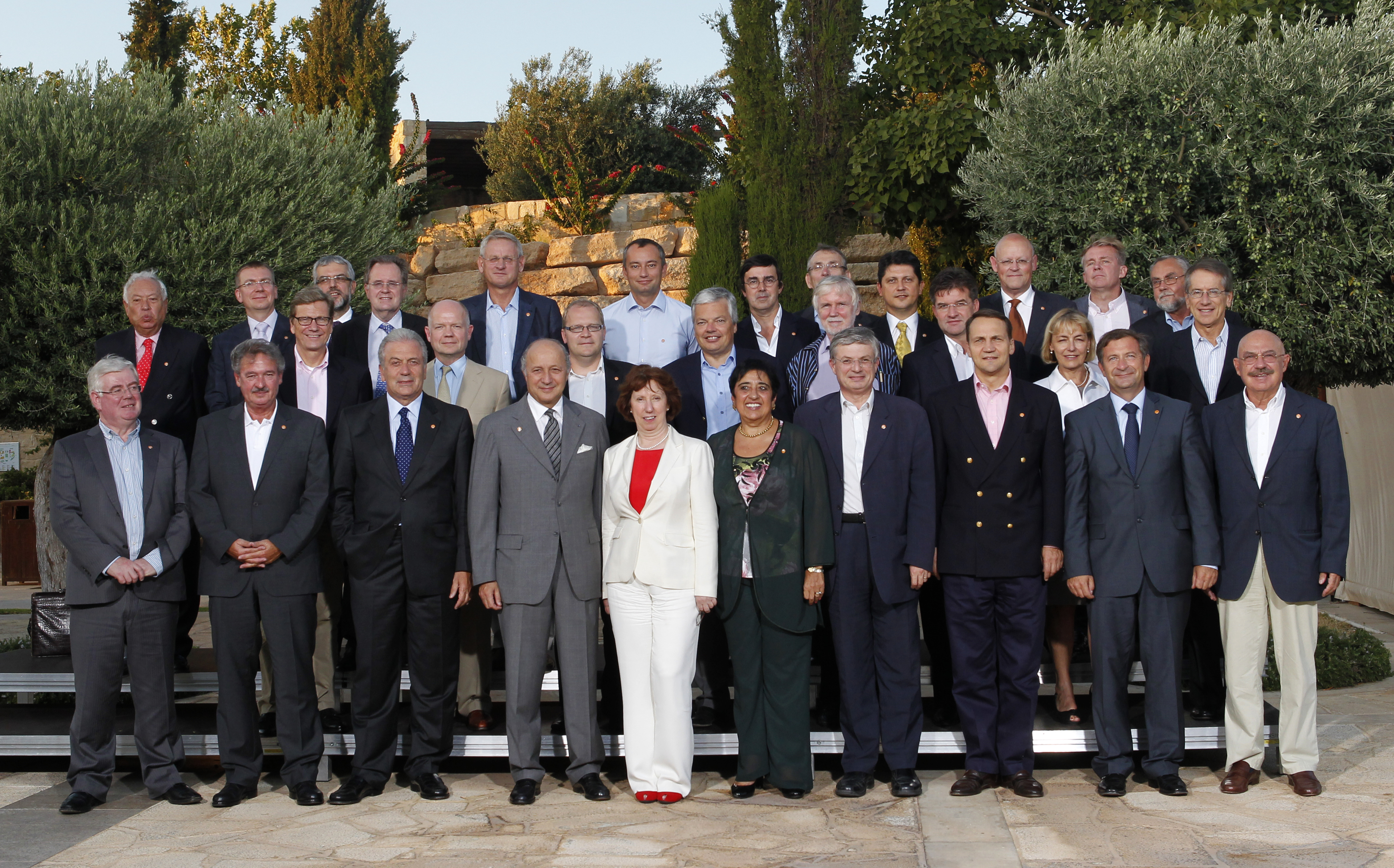
Foreign Ministers of the European Union countries in Limassol during Cyprus Presidency of the EU in 2012

While Cyprus had historically followed a non-aligned foreign policy, it increasingly identified with the West in its cultural affinities and trade patterns, and maintains close relations with the rest of the European Union (including Greece), as well as Armenia, and Lebanon. One of the requirements of the accession of Cyprus to the European Union in 2004 was for it to leave the Non-Aligned Movement.

Cyprus is one out of four European Union (EU) member states outside the North Atlantic Treaty Organization (NATO), and the only one not to participate in NATO's Partnership for Peace (PfP) program.

Since the entry into force of the Treaty of Lisbon in 2009, the EU mutual solidarity clause applies to Cyprus along with other EU member states:

If a Member State is the victim of armed aggression on its territory, the other Member States shall have towards it an obligation of aid and assistance by all the means in their power, in accordance with Article 51 of the United Nations Charter. This shall not prejudice the specific character of the security and defence policy of certain Member States. [...]

— Article 42.7 of the consolidated version of the Treaty on European Union

Article 42.2 specifies however that NATO shall be the main forum for the implementation of collective self-defence for EU member states that are also NATO members. The other EU member states that are outside NATO resort to the EU's Common Security and Defence Policy (CSDP, which has a much smaller structures and capabilities than NATO's command structure) for the implementation of collective self-defence are Austria, Ireland, and Malta.

==== Integration into NATO ====
The ongoing Cyprus dispute complicates Cyprus' relations with NATO. Any treaty concerning Cyprus' participation in NATO, either as a full member, PfP or Euro-Atlantic Partnership Council, would likely be vetoed by Turkey, a full member of NATO, unless the dispute is resolved first.

NATO membership for a reunified Cyprus, with the presence of NATO troops, has been proposed as a solution to the question of security guarantees, given that all three of the current guarantors under the Treaty of Guarantee (1960) (Greece, Turkey and the United Kingdom) are already NATO members.

The Parliament of Cyprus voted in February 2011 to apply for membership of NATO's Partnership for Peace program. However, President Demetris Christofias vetoed the decision, arguing that it would hamper his attempts to negotiate an end to the dispute and demilitarize the island.

Nicos Anastasiades, who was elected President in 2013, stated that he intended to apply for membership in the PfP program soon after taking over. His foreign minister Nikos Christodoulides later dismissed Cypriot membership of NATO or Partnership for Peace, preferring to keep Cyprus' foreign and defence affairs within the framework of the EU, i.e. the Common Security and Defence Policy (CSDP). In May 2022, defence minister Charalambos Petrides confirmed that the country would not apply to NATO despite the Russian invasion of Ukraine.

After the 2023 presidential election, Anastasiades' foreign minister Christodoulides succeeded him as President. In November 2024, Christodoulides reversed his previous stance and revealed a plan to deepen Cyprus' relations with NATO and eventually join as a full member. Under the first phase of the plan, Cyprus would seek to join preparatory organisations linked to NATO, which would require progress in resolving the Cyprus dispute with NATO member Turkey and improvements to EU–Turkey relations. Practical steps of the plan include securing a longer-term exemption from the U.S. arms embargo, expanding joint military training opportunities for the Cypriot National Guard at U.S. military academies, and modernisation of Cyprus' defence infrastructure to meet NATO standards. Christodoulides stated that "the U.S. response has been very positive" and that these steps "will ensure that, once all conditions are met, Cyprus can join NATO".

In 2025, Christodoulides proposed steps to improve relations with Turkey, with Turkey approving Cyprus joining PfP in exchange for Cyprus unblocking Turkey's cooperation with the EU. In 2026 Christodoulides stated that he would apply for NATO membership "tomorrow if it were possible", but that "the political conditions are not there, taking into account the well-known position of Turkey". However, he said the country was preparing so that "we are ready when the political conditions allow it."

== Public opinion ==
In a poll published by the Cyprus Broadcasting Corporation in February 2026, 46% supported joining NATO vs 28% opposed. This was an increase in support vs 43% in favour and 31% opposed in 2022.

== Cyprus's foreign relations with NATO member states ==
- Albania
- Belgium
- Bulgaria
- Canada
- Croatia
- Czech Republic
- Denmark
- Estonia
- France
- Germany
- Greece
- Hungary
- Iceland
- Italy
- Latvia
- Lithuania
- Luxembourg
- Montenegro
- Netherlands
- North Macedonia
- Norway
- Poland
- Portugal
- Romania
- Slovakia
- Slovenia
- Spain
- Sweden
- United Kingdom
- United States

Since NATO member Turkey does not recognize the government of the Republic of Cyprus, Cyprus does not have diplomatic relations with Turkey.

== See also ==
- Foreign relations of Cyprus
- Cyprus and the Non-Aligned Movement
- Cyprus in the European Union
- Cyprus problem
- Foreign relations of NATO
- Enlargement of NATO
  - NATO open door policy
- Partnership for Peace
- Neutral member states in the European Union
- European Union–NATO relations
- Cyprus–Greece relations
- Cyprus–Turkey relations
- Cyprus–United Kingdom relations
- Cyprus–United States relations

=== NATO relations of other EU member states outside NATO ===
- Austria–NATO relations
- Ireland–NATO relations
- Malta–NATO relations
