= Foreign relations of Cyprus =

Cyprus is a member of the United Nations along with most of its agencies as well as the Commonwealth of Nations, World Bank, International Monetary Fund and Council of Europe. In addition, the country has signed the General Agreement on Tariffs and Trade (GATT) and the Multilateral Investment Guarantee Agency Agreement (MIGA). Cyprus has been a member of the European Union since 2004. In the second half of 2012 and the first half of 2026 it held the Presidency of the Council of the European Union.

== Historical non-alignment ==
Cyprus historically used to follow a non-aligned foreign policy, although it increasingly identifies with the West in its cultural affinities and trade patterns, and maintains close relations with the European Union, Greece, Armenia, Lebanon, Israel and the United States.

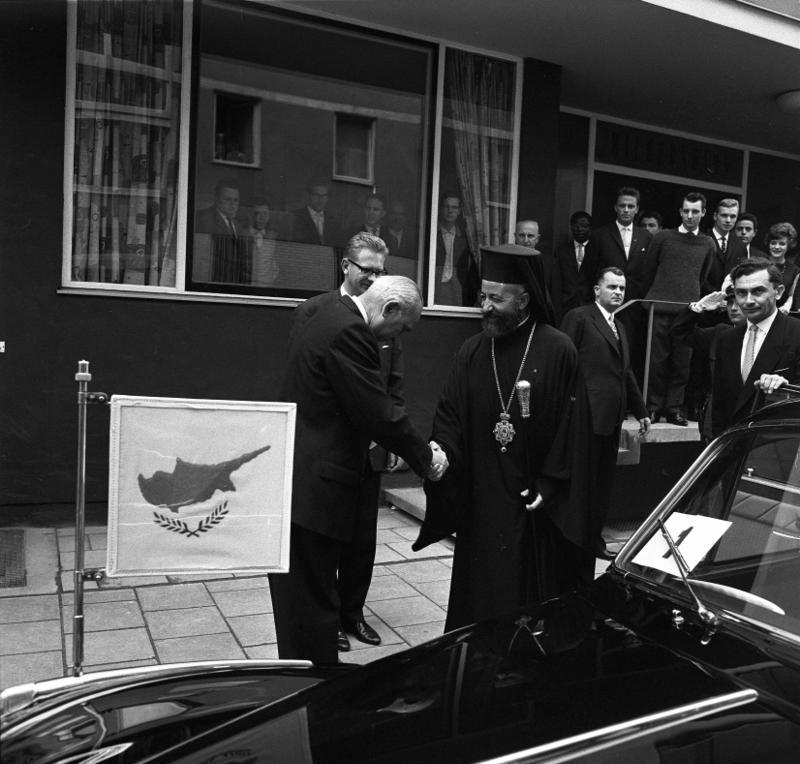
Cyprus former President Makarios III at a state visit in Munich with the German Chancellor in 1962

The prime originator of Cypriot non-alignment was Archbishop of Cyprus Makarios III, the first President (1960–1977) of the independent republic of Cyprus. Prior to independence, Makarios - by virtue of his post as Archbishop of Cyprus and head of the Cypriot Orthodox Church - was the Greek Cypriot Ethnarch, or de facto leader of the community. A highly influential figure well before independence, he participated in the 1955 Bandung Conference. After independence, Makarios took part in the 1961 founding meeting of the Non-Aligned Movement in Belgrade.

Reasons for this neutrality may lie in the extreme pressures exerted on the infant Republic by its larger neighbours, Turkey and Greece. Intercommunal rivalries and movements for union with Greece or partial union with Turkey may have persuaded Makarios to steer clear of close affiliation with either side. In any case, Cyprus became a high-profile member of the Non-Aligned Movement and retained its membership until its entry into the European Union in 2004. At the non-governmental level, Cyprus has also been a member of the popular extension of the Non-Aligned Movement, the Afro-Asian Peoples' Solidarity Organisation hosting several high-level meetings.

Immediately after the 1974 Greek-sponsored coup d'état and the Turkish invasion, Makarios secured international recognition of his administration as the legitimate government of the whole island. This was disputed only by Turkey, which currently recognizes only the Turkish Republic of Northern Cyprus, established in 1983.

Since the 1974 crisis, the chief aim of the foreign policy of the Republic of Cyprus has been to secure the withdrawal of Turkish forces and the reunification of the island under the most favorable constitutional and territorial settlement possible. This campaign has been pursued primarily through international forums such as the United Nations and the Non-Aligned Movement, and in recent years through the European Union.

In the 21st century, Cyprus is following a western foreign policy.

== Diplomatic relations ==
List of countries which Cyprus maintains diplomatic relations with:

#	Country	Date
1	Belgium	16 August 1960
2	France	16 August 1960
3	Greece	16 August 1960
—	Turkey (suspended)	16 August 1960
4	United Kingdom	16 August 1960
5	United States	16 August 1960
6	Israel	17 August 1960
7	Russia	18 August 1960
8	Germany	20 August 1960
9	Lebanon	20 September 1960
10	Netherlands	24 September 1960
11	Serbia	7 October 1960
12	Hungary	18 October 1960
13	Egypt	25 October 1960
14	Syria	25 October 1960
15	Bulgaria	30 October 1960
16	Denmark	2 November 1960
17	Romania	13 November 1960
18	Cuba	22 November 1960
19	Sweden	12 December 1960
20	Czech Republic	22 December 1960
21	Poland	15 January 1961
22	Canada	14 August 1961
23	Finland	2 September 1961
24	Italy	12 September 1961
25	Malaysia	1961
26	Pakistan	1961
27	Saudi Arabia	1961
28	India	10 February 1962
29	Jordan	26 February 1962
30	Japan	15 June 1962
31	Chile	26 June 1962
32	Austria	25 October 1962
33	Sudan	24 January 1963
34	Norway	22 March 1963
35	Switzerland	3 December 1963
36	Ivory Coast	25 January 1964
37	Brazil	21 July 1964
38	Uruguay	24 November 1965
39	Colombia	11 February 1966
40	Peru	12 September 1966
41	Spain	22 December 1967
42	Argentina	20 May 1968
43	Nigeria	24 January 1970
44	Luxembourg	3 March 1970
45	Somalia	1970
46	Panama	11 February 1971
47	China	14 December 1971
48	Guyana	11 February 1972
49	Barbados	27 February 1972
50	Trinidad and Tobago	25 May 1972
51	Jamaica	31 August 1972
52	Malta	13 September 1972
53	Kenya	1972
–	Holy See	31 January 1973
54	Iraq	22 June 1973
55	Libya	8 November 1973
56	Mongolia	19 December 1973
57	Mexico	21 February 1974
58	Australia	29 April 1974
59	Cameroon	1974
60	Portugal	5 March 1975
61	Bahamas	3 April 1975
62	Vietnam	1 December 1975
63	Seychelles	1 July 1976
64	Zambia	10 December 1976
65	Uganda	1 February 1977
66	Tanzania	24 February 1978
67	Papua New Guinea	31 March 1978
68	New Zealand	9 May 1978
69	Algeria	9 November 1978
70	Ecuador	14 February 1979
71	Iceland	4 September 1979
72	Morocco	1979
73	Sri Lanka	4 March 1980
74	Philippines	6 March 1980
75	Ethiopia	7 March 1980
76	Singapore	26 April 1980
77	Grenada	29 April 1980
78	Mozambique	3 May 1980
79	Thailand	5 May 1980
80	Saint Lucia	24 July 1980
81	Suriname	25 July 1980
82	Nepal	18 August 1980
83	Dominican Republic	7 May 1981
84	Costa Rica	17 November 1981
85	Bahrain	14 January 1982
86	Oman	27 January 1982
87	Nicaragua	26 May 1982
88	Venezuela	10 December 1982
89	Bangladesh	11 January 1983
90	Bolivia	3 March 1983
91	Yemen	7 November 1983
92	Ireland	23 November 1984
93	Myanmar	15 July 1985
94	Maldives	1 November 1987
95	Indonesia	15 December 1987
96	Afghanistan	1987
97	Iran	29 September 1988
98	Gabon	21 October 1988
99	Zimbabwe	13 February 1989
100	Ghana	5 May 1989
101	Mali	26 January 1990
102	Rwanda	31 March 1990
103	Albania	29 August 1991
104	Marshall Islands	17 November 1991
105	North Korea	23 December 1991
106	Ukraine	19 February 1992
107	Kyrgyzstan	20 February 1992
108	Moldova	21 February 1992
109	Tajikistan	27 February 1992
110	Armenia	18 March 1992
111	Kazakhstan	2 April 1992
112	Belarus	9 April 1992
113	Federated States of Micronesia	5 May 1992
114	Georgia	9 July 1992
115	San Marino	20 October 1992
116	Lithuania	3 December 1992
117	Slovenia	10 December 1992
118	Guatemala	17 December 1992
119	Estonia	20 December 1992
120	Latvia	20 December 1992
121	Slovakia	1 January 1993
122	South Africa	10 December 1993
123	Croatia	4 April 1993
124	Andorra	29 June 1995
125	Burundi	3 October 1995
126	South Korea	28 December 1995
127	Liechtenstein	2 October 1996
128	Brunei	6 November 1996
129	Uzbekistan	30 May 1997
130	El Salvador	5 November 1999
131	Bosnia and Herzegovina	7 February 2000
132	Nauru	23 March 2000
133	Cambodia	16 May 2000
134	Samoa	24 May 2000
135	Cape Verde	31 May 2000
136	Angola	1 June 2000
137	Democratic Republic of the Congo	20 June 2000
138	Malawi	22 June 2000
139	Laos	29 June 2000
140	Belize	21 July 2000
141	São Tomé and Príncipe	7 November 2000
142	Sierra Leone	22 November 2000
143	Liberia	30 November 2000
144	Gambia	8 December 2000
145	Mauritius	1 February 2001
146	Qatar	21 February 2001
147	Burkina Faso	13 June 2001
148	Dominica	13 June 2001
149	Eritrea	6 August 2001
150	Paraguay	8 October 2001
151	Timor-Leste	20 June 2002
152	Niger	17 September 2002
153	Chad	18 September 2002
154	Namibia	20 June 2003
155	Lesotho	25 February 2004
156	Antigua and Barbuda	22 July 2004
157	Comoros	10 November 2004
158	Honduras	7 February 2005
159	Botswana	22 February 2005
160	Madagascar	3 March 2005
161	Kuwait	3 May 2005
162	Mauritania	6 May 2005
163	Guinea	20 December 2005
164	Saint Vincent and the Grenadines	2 August 2006
165	Montenegro	12 March 2007
166	United Arab Emirates	6 June 2007
167	Turkmenistan	13 November 2007
168	Equatorial Guinea	29 February 2008
169	Guinea-Bissau	20 May 2008
170	Tonga	22 June 2009
171	Solomon Islands	5 May 2010
172	Monaco	23 February 2011
—	Sovereign Military Order of Malta	6 June 2012
173	Fiji	15 March 2013
—	State of Palestine	9 February 2013
174	Tuvalu	2 July 2013
175	Palau	10 August 2015
176	Togo	24 September 2015
177	Saint Kitts and Nevis	8 March 2016
178	North Macedonia	30 August 2019
179	South Sudan	24 September 2021
180	Benin	10 October 2023
181	Central African Republic	21 September 2026
182	Eswatini	Unknown
183	Senegal	Unknown
184	Tunisia	Unknown
185	Vanuatu	Unknown

== Bilateral relations ==
=== Multilateral ===
Organization	Formal Relations Began	Notes
European Union		See Cyprus in the European Union Cyprus joined the European Union as a full member on 1 May 2004.
NATO		See Cyprus–NATO relations Cyprus is not a member of NATO.

=== Africa ===
Country	Formal relations began	Notes
Algeria	9 November 1978	See Algeria–Cyprus relations: Both countries are full members of the Union for the Mediterranean. Relations are normal.
Burundi	3 October 1995	Burundi is represented in Cyprus by its embassy in Geneva.; Cyprus is represented in Burundi by its embassy in Doha.
Comoros	10 November 2004	Cyprus is represented in Comoros by its embassy in Pretoria.
Egypt	25 October 1960	See Cyprus–Egypt relations
Eswatini		Cyprus is represented in Swaziland through its High Commission in Pretoria, South Africa.; Swaziland is represented in Cyprus through its High Commission in London.
Lesotho	25 February 2004	Cyprus is represented in Lesotho through its embassy in Pretoria, South Africa.; Lesotho is represented in Cyprus via parallel accreditation of its embassy in London.
Libya	8 November 1973	See Cyprus–Libya relations
Madagascar	3 March 2005	Cyprus is represented in Madagascar through its embassy in Pretoria, South Africa.
Mauritania	6 May 2005	Cyprus is represented in Mauritania by its embassy in Tripoli.; Mauritania is represented in Cyprus by its embassy in Rome.
Mauritius	1 February 2001	Cyprus is represented in Mauritius through its High Commission in Pretoria, South Africa.
Morocco	1979	Cyprus is represented in Morocco through its embassy in Lisbon. Portugal.; Morocco is represented in Cyprus through its embassy in Athens, Greece.
Namibia	20 June 2003	Cyprus is represented in Namibia through its High Commission in Pretoria, South Africa.; Namibia is represented in Cyprus through its High Commission in London, United Kingdom.
Seychelles	1 July 1976	Cyprus is represented in Seychelles through its embassy in Muscat, Oman.; Seychelles is represented in Cyprus through its High Commission in London, United Kingdom.
South Africa	10 December 1993	Cyprus has a High Commission in Pretoria.; South Africa is represented in Cyprus through its embassy in Athens, Greece.
Togo	24 September 2015	Cyprus is represented in Togo by its embassy in Paris, France.
Zambia	1 February 1977	Cyprus is represented in Zambia by its High Commission in Pretoria, South Africa.; Zambia is represented in Cyprus by its embassy in Rome, Italy.; Both countries have a bilateral agreement on Air Service between both countries.

=== Americas ===
Country	Formal relations began	Notes
Argentina	20 May 1968	Argentina is accredited to Cyprus from its embassy in Tel Aviv, Israel.; Cyprus is accredited to Argentina from its embassy in Madrid, Spain.
Belize	21 July 2000	Cyprus is represented in Belize through its embassy in Mexico City, Mexico.
Brazil	21 July 1964	Cyprus has an embassy in Brasília.; Brazil has an embassy in Nicosia.
Canada	14 August 1961	See Canada–Cyprus relations: Canada is accredited to Cyprus from its embassy in Athens, Greece.; Cyprus has a High Commission in Ottawa.
Colombia	11 February 1966	In 2010, both Ministers of Foreign Affairs signed a cooperation agreement regarding tourism and the war on drugs.
Guyana	11 February 1972	Cyprus is represented in Guyana by its embassy in Brasília, Brazil.
Mexico	21 February 1974	See Cyprus–Mexico relations: Mexico is accredited to Cyprus from its embassy in Athens, Greece.
Peru	12 September 1966	Cyprus is represented in Peru through its embassy in Brasília, Brazil.
Trinidad and Tobago	25 May 1972	Cyprus is represented in Trinidad and Tobago by its embassy in New York.
United States	16 August 1960	See Cyprus–United States relations: Cyprus has an embassy in Washington, D.C., and a consulate-general in New York City.; United States has an embassy in Nicosia.

=== Asia ===
Country	Formal relations began	Notes
Armenia	18 March 1992	See Armenia–Cyprus relations: Armenia has an embassy in Nicosia.; Cyprus has an embassy in Yerevan.
China	14 December 1971	See China–Cyprus relations: China has an embassy in Nicosia.; Cyprus has an embassy in Beijing.
India	10 February 1962	See Cyprus–India relations: India has a High Commission in Nicosia.
Indonesia	15 December 1987	See Cyprus–Indonesia relations: Cyprus reopened its embassy in Jakarta in October 2023.; Indonesia is represented in Cyprus through its embassy in Rome, Italy.
Iran	29 September 1988	Cyprus has an embassy in Tehran.
Israel	17 August 1960	See Cyprus–Israel relations: Cyprus has an embassy in Tel Aviv.; Israel has an embassy in Nicosia.
Kazakhstan	2 April 1992	Cyprus has an embassy in Astana.; In 2025, Kazakhstan has announced plans to open an embassy in Nicosia.
Kuwait	3 May 2005	See Cyprus–Kuwait relations
Lebanon	20 September 1960	See Cyprus–Lebanon relations: Cyprus has an embassy in Beirut.
Maldives	1 November 1987	Cyprus is represented in the Maldives by its High Commission in New Delhi, India.
Mongolia	19 December 1973	Cyprus is represented in Mongolia through its embassy in Beijing, China.; Mongolia is represented in Cyprus through its embassy in Sofia, Bulgaria
Palestine	9 February 2013	See Cyprus–Palestine relations
Qatar	21 February 2001	See Cyprus–Qatar relations
Sri Lanka	4 March 1980	Cyprus is represented in Sri Lanka by its High Commission in New Delhi, India.; Sri Lanka is represented in Cyprus by its embassy in Rome, Italy.; Both countries have agreed on bilateral treaties in various fields.
Syria	25 October 1960	See Cyprus–Syria relations
Tajikistan	27 February 1992	Both countries have a bilateral agreements on Cooperation in the Fields of Public Health and Medical Science.
Thailand	5 May 1980	Cyprus is represented in Thailand through its High Commission in New Delhi, India.; Thailand is represented in Cyprus through its embassy in Rome, Italy.
Turkey	16 August 1960 (suspended)	See Cyprus–Turkey relations Turkey does not recognize the government of the Republic of Cyprus, stating that the Republic—as established by the Constitution of 1960—ceased to exist when the intercommunal violence that commenced in December 1963 ended Turkish Cypriot participation in the Cypriot government. The attempted coup in July 1974—engineered by Greek Military Junta—was responded to by Turkey by a full military invasion, which resulted in the northern third of the island being occupied by Turkish military forces. This portion of Cyprus unilaterally declared independence in November 1983 as the Turkish Republic of Northern Cyprus (TRNC), which only Turkey recognizes. Turkey refers to the Republic of Cyprus government as the "Greek Administration of Southern Cyprus".
United Arab Emirates	6 June 2007	See Cyprus–United Arab Emirates relations

=== Europe ===
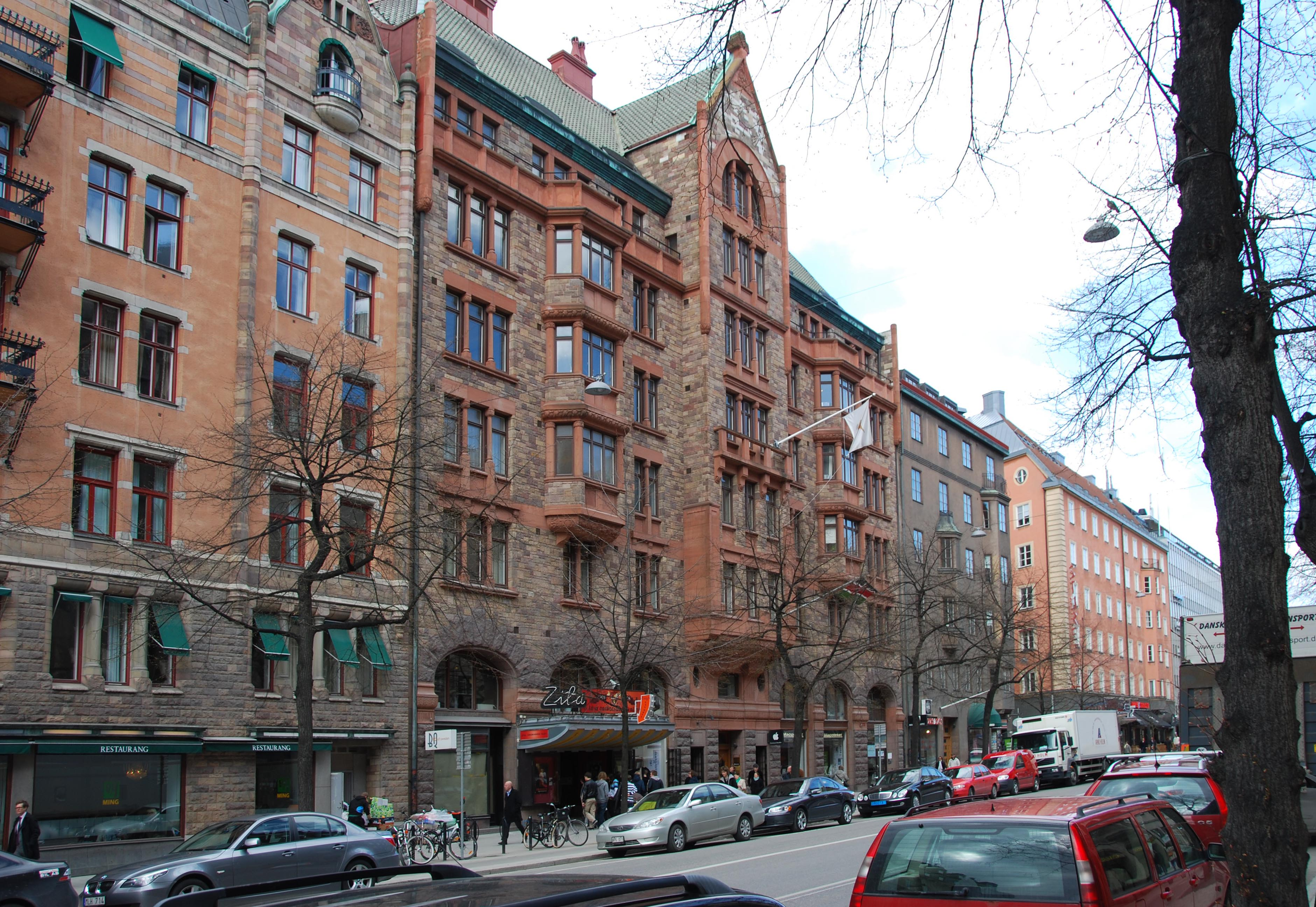
Cyprus embassy in Stockholm

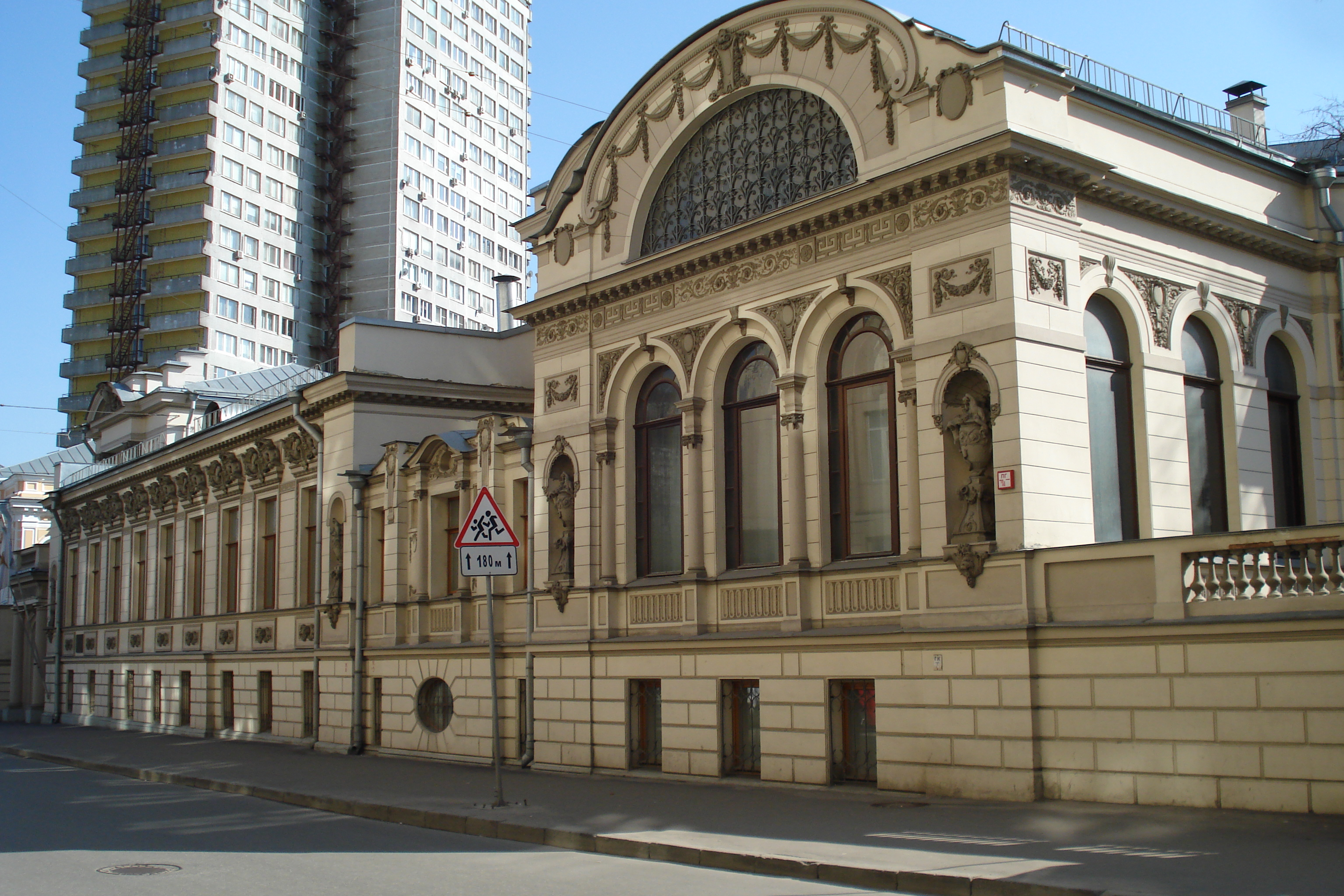
Cyprus embassy in Moscow

Cyprus' 1990 application for full EU membership caused a storm in the Turkish Cypriot community, which argued that the move required their consent. Following the December 1997 EU Summit decisions on EU enlargement, accession negotiations began 31 March 1998. Cyprus joined the European Union on 1 May 2004. To fulfil its commitment as a member of the European Union, Cyprus withdrew from the Non-Aligned Movement on accession, retaining observer status.

Country	Formal relations began	Notes
Albania	29 August 1991	Albania is represented in Cyprus by its embassy in Athens, Greece.; Cyprus is represented in Albania by its embassy in Athens, Greece.; Both countries have a number of bilateral agreements.
Austria	25 October 1962	See Austria–Cyprus relations
Bulgaria	30 October 1960	See Bulgaria–Cyprus relations
Croatia	4 April 1993	See Croatia–Cyprus relations
Czech Republic	22 December 1960	See Cyprus–Czech Republic relations: Cyprus has an embassy in Prague.; The Czech Republic has an embassy in Nicosia.
Denmark	30 October 1960	See Cyprus–Denmark relations: Cyprus has an embassy in Copenhagen.; Denmark has an embassy in Nicosia.
Finland	2 September 1961	Cyprus has an embassy in Helsinki.; Finland has an embassy in Nicosia.
France	16 August 1960	See Cyprus–France relations: In 2019 it was decided the establishment of a French military marine base on the island.
Germany	20 August 1960	See Cyprus–Germany relations: Cyprus has an embassy in Berlin and a consulate-general in Hamburg.; Germany has an embassy in Nicosia.
Greece	16 August 1960	See Cyprus–Greece relations
Hungary	18 October 1960	Hungary has an embassy in Nicosia.
Iceland	4 September 1979	Cyprus is represented in Iceland by its embassy in Copenhagen, Denmark.; Iceland is represented in Cyprus by its embassy in Stockholm, Sweden.
(Republic of Ireland) Ireland	23 November 1984	See Cyprus–Ireland relations: Since 1964, over 9,000 members of the Irish Defence Forces have served in Cyprus without suffering any casualties.
Italy	12 September 1961	Italy has an embassy in Nicosia.
Lithuania	3 December 1992	Lithuania is represented in Cyprus through its embassy in Athens (Greece).
Malta	13 September 1972	See Cyprus–Malta relations
Netherlands	24 September 1960	See Cyprus–Netherlands relations: Cyprus has an embassy in The Hague.; The Netherlands have an embassy in Nicosia.
Norway	22 March 1963	See Cyprus–Norway relations The government in Cyprus considers that "bilateral relations between Cyprus and Norway are excellent in all fields". Neither country has resident ambassadors. Cyprus is represented in Norway through its embassy in Stockholm, Sweden, and 2 honorary consulates, one in Oslo and the second in Kristiansand. Norway is represented in Cyprus through its embassy in Athens, Greece, and an honorary consulate in Nicosia. Both countries are full members of the Council of Europe. Diplomatic relations were established on 22 March 1963. On 21 August 1951, there was a Consular Convention and an Exchange of Letters relating to establishing diplomatic relations. On 2 May 1951, there was a Convention for the Avoidance of Double Taxation and the Prevention of Fiscal Evasion with respect to Taxes on Income. On 17 May 1962, there was an Exchange of Letters constituting an Agreement on the Abolition of Visa Requirement in Nicosia. On 5 March 1963, there was an Agreement on Commercial Scheduled Air Transport signed in London. The taxation levels in Cyprus are considerably lower than in Norway, and Cyprus has actively courted Norwegians to move to Cyprus. Among the Norwegians who moved to Cyprus is the shipping billionaire John Fredriksen, who was the richest man in Norway. In 1996 tax rules in Norway were changed to keep shipping companies competitive and under the Norwegian flag. By 2008 changes to the tonnage tax regime to harmonize them with the European Union forced some companies to register in Cyprus. Norwegian Service rig company Prosafe moved their headquarters to Cyprus. Several Norwegian retirees also moved to Cyprus; this too is largely to benefit from the lower tax rate on Cyprus and the minimal crime.
Poland	15 January 1961	See Cyprus–Poland relations: Poland has an embassy in Nicosia.
Portugal	5 March 1975	Cyprus has an embassy in Lisbon.
Romania	13 November 1960	Romania has an embassy in Nicosia since November 1960.
Russia	18 August 1960	See Cyprus–Russia relations
Serbia	7 October 1960	See Cyprus–Serbia relations: The two countries share common cultural and religious ascpects as both have major Orthodox Christian populations.
Slovakia	1 January 1993	Slovakia has an embassy in Nicosia.
Spain	22 December 1967	See Cyprus–Spain relations: Cyprus has an embassy in Madrid.; Spain has an embassy Nicosia.
Sweden	12 December 1960	See Cyprus–Sweden relations: Sweden was one of the first countries to send UN peacekeepers to Cyprus in 1964.; Since 1994, Cyprus has an embassy in Stockholm.; Sweden has an embassy in Nicosia.
Ukraine	19 February 1992	The Cypriot embassy in Kyivl.; Ukraine has an embassy in Nicosia.
United Kingdom	1 October 1960	See Cyprus–United Kingdom relations The UK is a "guarantor power" of Cyprus's independence.: Cyprus maintains a high commission in London, and honorary consulates in Belfast, Birmingham, Bristol, Dunblane, Glasgow, and Leeds.; The United Kingdom is accredited to Cyprus through its high commission in Nicosia.; The UK governed Cyprus from 1878 until 1960, when it achieved full independence. Both countries share common membership of the Commonwealth, the Council of Europe, European Court of Human Rights, the International Criminal Court, the OSCE, the United Nations, and the World Trade Organization. Bilaterally the two countries have a Double Taxation Agreement.

=== Oceania ===
Country	Formal relations began	Notes
Australia	29 April 1974	See Australia–Cyprus relations: Australia has a High Commission in Nicosia.; Cyprus has a High Commission in Canberra.
Fiji	15 March 2013	Cyprus is represented in Fiji by its High Commission in Canberra, Australia.
Papua New Guinea	31 March 1978	Cyprus is represented in Papua New Guinea through its High Commission in Canberra, Australia.
Solomon Islands	5 May 2010	Both countries established diplomatic relations on May 5, 2010.; Cyprus is represented in the Solomon Islands via parallel accreditation of its High Commission in Canberra, Australia.
Vanuatu		Cyprus is represented in Vanuatu by its High Commission in Canberra, Australia.

== Multilateral relations ==
- Cyprus–NATO relations

== International disputes ==
The 1974 invasion of the Turkish army divided the island nation into two. The internationally recognised Republic of Cyprus currently has effective control in the south of the island (59% of the island's land area) while its area not under its effective control makes up 37% of the island. Turkey utilising the territory occupied during the invasion recognizes a declared separatist UDI of Turkish Cypriots in 1983, contrary to multiple United Nations Security Council Resolutions. The two territories of the Republic are separated by a United Nations Buffer Zone (4% of the island); there are two UK sovereign base areas mostly within the Greek Cypriot portion of the island.

== See also ==
- Cyprus and the European Union
- Cyprus–NATO relations
- List of diplomatic missions of Cyprus
- List of diplomatic missions in Cyprus
- List of ministers of foreign affairs of Cyprus
- Foreign relations of Northern Cyprus
