= Cyprus–Qatar relations =

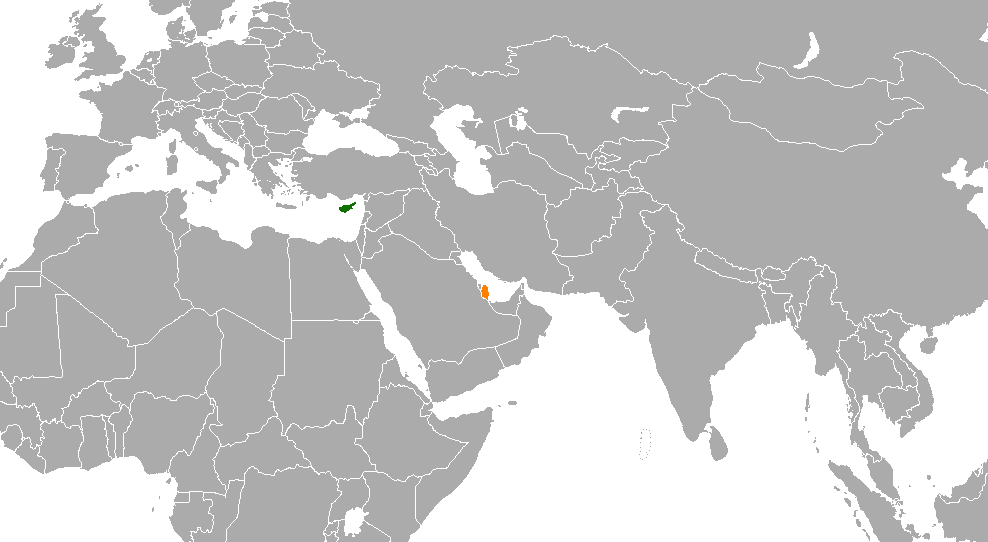

- Cyprus: Qatar

Cyprus–Qatar relations refer to the bilateral relations between Cyprus and Qatar. Qatar is represented in Cyprus through its embassy in Nicosia. Cyprus is represented in Qatar through its embassy in Doha.

== History ==
Relations between the two countries began in the mid-1950s when Cypriot businessmen invested in and set up businesses in Qatar.

Formal diplomatic relations between Cyprus and Qatar were established on 21 February 2001. The two countries signed an Air Services Agreement in 2002, following completed negotiations, which was expected to develop relations in economy and tourism.

In 2004, Cyprus opened its embassy in Doha, the capital of Qatar, becoming the first Cypriot embassy in a Gulf Cooperation Council (GCC) country. The Qatari embassy opened in Nicosia in 2007, making it the first Gulf embassy in Cyprus.

In November 2008, Sheikh Hamad bin Jassim, who was Qatar's Prime Minister during that time, visited Cyprus. During this visit, the countries signed seven bilateral agreements to enhance cooperation in various sectors, as well as a Bilateral Investment Treaty (BIT). Demetris Christofias described the visit as a "cornerstone in relations between the two countries" and also accepted an invitation to visit Qatar, and travelled to Doha the following year in 2009.

In December 2008, the Qatar Central Bank and the Central Bank of Cyprus signed a Memorandum of Understanding defining a framework for mutual cooperation and exchange of information regarding the supervision of credit institutions.

In April 2010, Sheikh Hamad bin Khalifa visited Cyprus. This marked the highest-level visit from Qatar to date. The visit resulted in the strengthening and development of bilateral relations, with several agreements signed between the two countries.

In January 2014, Nicos Anastasiades, who was the president of Cyprus, visited Doha heading a high-level official and commercial delegation that included several ministers and more than 60 businessmen. During this visit, an agreement and three Memoranda of Understanding were signed. The president called on Qatari businessmen to explore investment opportunities in Cyprus.

In April 2017, Qatar Petroleum and ExxonMobil signed an exploration and production sharing contract with the government of Cyprus for offshore Block 10. The consortium began preparations for exploration drilling in 2018, making a significant step in energy cooperation between the countries.

In December 2021, President Nicos Anastasiades witnessed the opening ceremony of the new building of the Qatari embassy in Nicosia. During the opening, the street where the embassy is located was renamed "Qatar Street" and the adjacent park was named "Doha Park".

In November 2023, President Nikos Christodoulides visited Doha and met with Sheikh Tamim bin Hamad Al Thani. A Memorandum for Understanding for cooperation in higher education, scientific research, and technology was signed.

In May 2024, Sheikh Tamim bin Hamad Al Thani, the emir of Qatar, made his first visit to Cyprus, 23 years after the establishment of diplomatic relations. The leaders of Qatar and Cyprus discussed about strengthening bilateral relations in various fields, such as economy, investment, tourism, regional cooperation, and Cyprus' "Amalthea" initiative for providing humanitarian assistance to the Gaza Strip. The president of Cyprus, Nikos Christodoulides, stated that Cyprus, as an EU member state, could serve as Qatar's "Ambassador in Brussels".

== Economic cooperation ==
ExxonMobil and Qatar's state-owned energy company QatarEnergy have partnered to explore Cyprus' hydrocarbon reserves. After discovering a modest deposits of offshore natural gas reserves in 2019, a more sizable reserve was found off the southern coast of the island in 2025.

== Diplomatic cooperation ==
The highest level visit from Qatar took place in April 2010, when Qatari emir Hamad bin Khalifa Al Thani visited Cyprus. A preliminary agreement for a joint real estate venture was signed during this visit. In May 2011, Cyprus and Qatar finalized the agreement. The agreement concluded a development project opposite of the Hilton Hotel in Nicosia which involved the construction of a five-star hotel, a shopping mall, offices and apartments.

In statements to the press, President Christofias said bilateral relations and ways to enhance them were discussed during the talks, and that the joint investment with Qatari Diar was of great importance, noting that it indicated the high level of relations and the rapid development of cooperation between the two countries. This emphasis on a strong desire for increased economic cooperation between the two nations was reiterated in 2024 when emir Al Thani visited president Christodoulides.

Cyprus' imports from Qatar nearly doubled from 2006 to 2010, whereas its exports increased by more than 50%. In 2010, Qatar was Cyprus' twenty-second largest importer.

== See also ==
- Foreign relations of Cyprus
- Foreign relations of Qatar
