= Cyprus–Palestine relations =

- Cyprus: Palestine

The relationship between Palestine and Cyprus is characterized by close friendship and political alliance. Both countries were previously under British control. Cyprus recognized the State of Palestine immediately after its declaration in 1988. Palestine has an embassy in Nicosia and Cyprus has a representative office in Ramallah. In January 2011, the Cypriot government reaffirmed its recognition of the Palestinian State in 1988, and added that it would not recognise any changes to the pre-1967 borders.

In 2024, during the Gaza war, Cyprus sent 200 tons of food to northern Gaza.

== State visits ==
- 15 March 2011, by President Demetris Christofias.
- 13 June 2022, by President Mahmoud Abbas.
- 2 August 2023, by President Nikos Christodoulides.
- 4 May 2025, by President Nikos Christodoulides.
- 29 October 2026, by President Mahmoud Abbas.

== See also ==
- Foreign relations of Cyprus
- Foreign relations of Palestine
