= Canada–Cyprus relations =

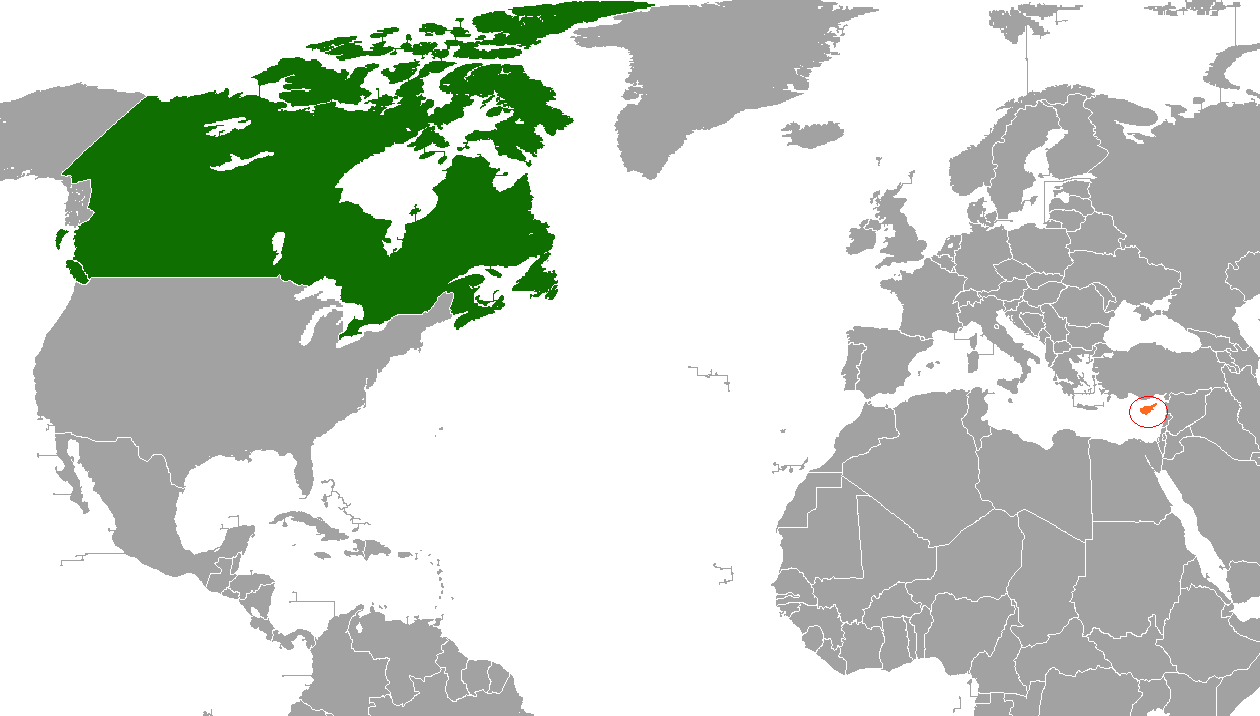

- Canada: Cyprus

Political relations between Canada and Cyprus stemmed initially from Cyprus' Commonwealth membership at its independence in 1960. These relations quickly expanded in 1964 when Canada became a major troop contributor to United Nations Peacekeeping Force in Cyprus. The participation lasted for the next 29 years, during which 50,000 Canadian soldiers served and 28 were killed. In large measure Canadian relations with Cyprus continue to revolve around support for the ongoing efforts of the UN, G8 and others to resolve the island's divided status. Contacts with Cyprus on other issues also take place in international organizations such as the UN, the OSCE and the Commonwealth of Nations, of which both countries are full members.

Bilateral commercial relations with Cyprus remain relatively modest. In 2005, Canada exported to Cyprus a little more than $10 million worth of goods and services. Canada's exports were mostly machinery, wood products and vegetables. Canadian imports from Cyprus grew in 2005 and were worth $17.8 million. They were mostly ships and boats, machinery and edible fruits and nuts. Canadian investment in Cyprus was $98 million in 2006.

== Resident diplomatic missions ==
- Canada is accredited to Cyprus from its embassy in Athens, Greece.
- Cyprus has a high commission in Ottawa.

== See also ==
- Foreign relations of Canada
- Foreign relations of Cyprus
- Canada-EU relations
- Cyprus-NATO relations
- NATO-EU relations
- Comprehensive Economic and Trade Agreement
