= Cyprus–Mexico relations =

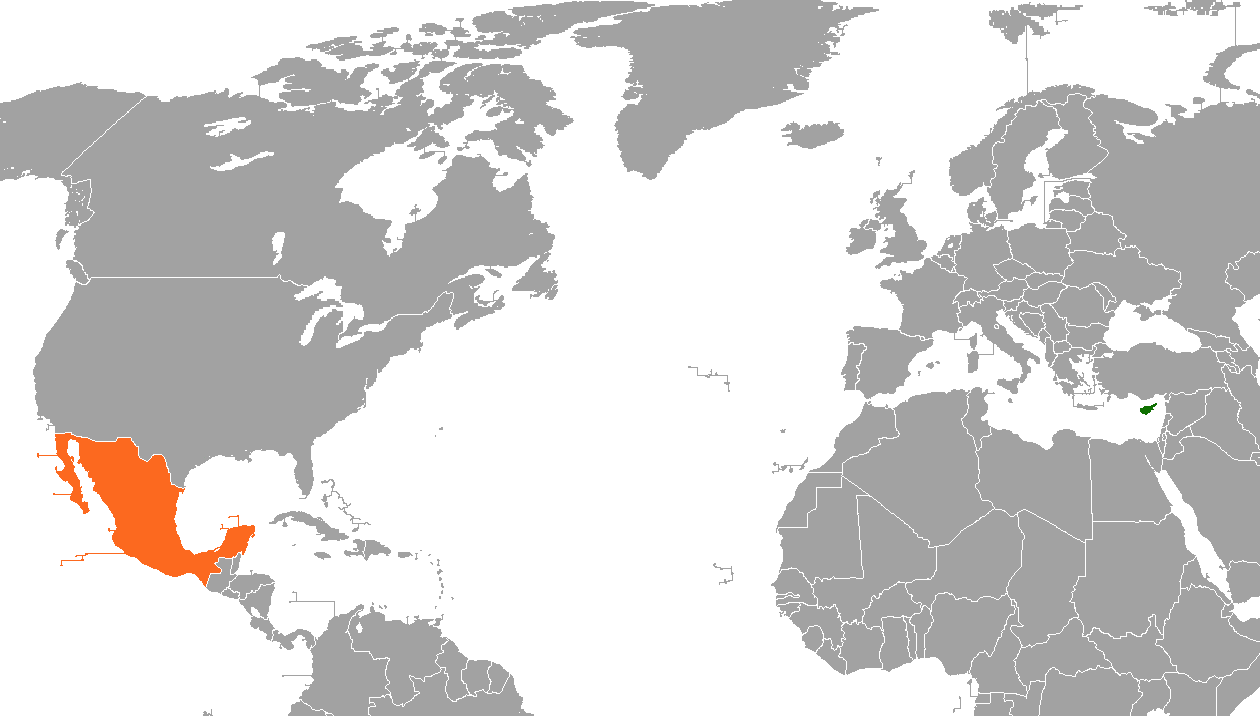

- Cyprus: Mexico

The nations of Cyprus and Mexico established diplomatic relations in 1974. Both nations are members of the United Nations.

== History ==
In 1960, Mexico recognized Cyprus' independence from the United Kingdom. On 21 February 1974, Cyprus and Mexico established diplomatic relations. In 1981, Cyprus opened an embassy in Mexico City, its first in Latin America. In 1991, Mexico opened an honorary consulate in Nicosia.

In 1974, Mexico took a neutral stance during the Turkish invasion of Cyprus, however, Mexico concurs with the resolutions issued by the United Nations Security Council that the basis for a fair and balanced solution to the Cyprus problem and has insisted on the sovereignty, independence and territorial integrity of Cyprus. In September 1990, Cypriot Foreign Minister, Georgios Iacovou, paid a visit to Mexico and met with his counterpart Fernando Solana. During the visit, Secretary Solana condemned the occupation of part of the territory of Cyprus by foreign troops and hoped a solution would be found within the United Nations.

In June 1997, a Mexican congressional delegation, led by Congressional Deputy Juan José Osorio Palacios; paid a visit to Cyprus to enhance bilateral relations between both nations. In October 2000, Mexican Foreign Undersecretary, Juan Rebolledo Gout, paid a visit to Nicosia. In May 2004, Cyprus joined the European Union. That same month, Cypriot President Tassos Papadopoulos and Foreign Minister Georgios Iacovou attended the European Union, Latin America and the Caribbean Summit in Guadalajara, Mexico.

In November 2009, the Cypriot Government donated to the Museo Nacional de las Culturas more than 100 ethnographic and historical pieces from Cyprus, as well as books and CDs that account for the culture of that country. In February 2014, the Mexico-Cyprus Friendship Group was created by the Mexican Congress in order to increase cultural and tourist exchanges between both nations.

In 2020, Cyprus closed its embassy in Mexico City. In 2024, both nations celebrated 50 years of diplomatic relations.

== High-level visits ==
High-level visits from Cyprus to Mexico

- Foreign Minister Georgios Iacovou (1990, 2004)
- Minister for Education Uranios Ioannides (2002)
- President Tassos Papadopoulos (2004)
- Minister of Agriculture Demetris Eliades (2010)
- Representative Georgios Tassou (2011)

High-level visits from Mexico to Cyprus

- Congressional Deputy Juan José Osorio Palacios (1997)
- Foreign Undersecretary Juan Rebolledo Gout (2000)

== Agreements ==
Both nations have signed a few bilateral agreements such as an Agreement for Cultural, Educational and Scientific Cooperation (1994); Agreement for Touristic Cooperation (1996); Visa Waiver Agreement for Diplomatic and Service Passports (1996); and a Memorandum of Understanding to Establish a Consulting Mechanism about Common Interests Matters (2000).

== Trade ==
In 2023, trade between both nations totaled US$17.6 million. Cyprus' main exports to Mexico include: medicines, telephones and mobile phones, electrical apparatus, containers (including tank containers), articles of iron or steel, minerals, and fruit and vegetables juices. Mexico's main exports to Cyprus include: wheat and meslin, jams and jellies, yeast, fish, alcohol, data processing machines, chemical based products, vehicles, tubes and pipes, and oils of petroleum.

== Diplomatic missions ==
- Cyprus does not have an accreditation to Mexico, however, maintains honorary consulates in Mérida, Monterrey and Toluca.
- Mexico is accredited to Cyprus from its embassy in Athens, Greece and maintains an honorary consulate in Nicosia.

== See also ==
- Foreign relations of Cyprus
- Foreign relations of Mexico
