= Cyprus–Indonesia relations =

- Cyprus: Indonesia

Diplomatic mission
- Embassy of Cyprus, Jakarta: Embassy of Indonesia, Rome

Cyprus–Indonesia relations refer to foreign relations between Cyprus and Indonesia since 1987. Both nations are members of the World Trade Organization and the United Nations.

== History ==
On 4 December 1987, Cyprus and Indonesia agreed to establish diplomatic ties at an ambassadorial level which came into effect on 15 December of that year, and they have had friendly and close bilateral relations ever since. But even before formal bilateral connections were established, the two nations had a lengthy history together that dates back to the Non-Aligned Movement's inception. In 1955, Archbishop Makarios attended the first Non-Aligned Movement meeting in Bandung. He would go on to become the first President of Cyprus. Cyprus was one of the twenty-five attendees of the Belgrade summit in 1961, where the Movement was formally founded.

In a ceremony held in Jakarta in 2006, the President of Indonesia, Susilo Bambang Yudhoyono, articulated his nation's dedication to persist in its support for Cyprus and its endeavors to achieve a resolution to the enduring Cyprus issue. The Indonesian President was briefed by Cyprus' High Commissioner to Australia, Achilleas Antoniades, on the latest developments surrounding the matter. He also conveyed the Cypriot government's appreciation for Indonesia's "continuous support for reaching a settlement of the Cyprus problem, a support that is based on the principles of respect of the national sovereignty, territorial integrity, and international law, as well on the traditionally excellent relations between both countries." President Yudhoyono expressed his nation's appreciation for the aid provided to the victims of the Indonesian tsunami to Cypriot President Tassos Papadopoulos and the citizens of Cyprus. Antoniades reiterated Cyprus' willingness to provide Indonesia with any facilities necessary in connection with its choice to join the UN Peace Force in Lebanon.

As an attempt to strengthen ties, Cyprus established an embassy in Jakarta in 2010 with Nicos Panayi as its first ambassador. However, the euro area crisis forced the closure of the embassy. Until October 2023, diplomatic relations were managed by the Cypriot High Commission in Canberra, Australia.

In an effort to promote more bilateral collaboration between the two nations, Indonesian Foreign Minister Retno Marsudi and her colleague from Cyprus, Ioannis Kasoulides, held bilateral discussions on 19 September 2017. She said there is still a lot of opportunity for the two nations to improve their bilateral ties. Marsudi extended an invitation to businesspeople in Cyprus to participate in Trade Expo Indonesia, set for October 2017 in Jakarta. In response, Indonesia's proposal for a non-permanent membership in the UN Security Council was enthusiastically supported by the foreign minister of Cyprus, who also commended Indonesia for its diplomatic efforts to advance regional and international peace and security.

The Virtual Diplomatic Celebration of the 75th Anniversary of Indonesia's Independence Day and the Bilateral Relations between Indonesia and Cyprus was held on 21 October 2020 by the Indonesian Embassy in Rome.

On 23 October 2023, Nikos Panayiotou, the newly appointed ambassador of Cyprus to Indonesia, gave President Joko Widodo his credentials at a ceremony conducted at Jakarta's Merdeka Palace. He mentioned the reopening of the Cypriot embassy, stating that it is a concrete indication of the significance that Cyprus places on its relations with Indonesia.

== Cooperation ==
On 1 November 2025, Cyprus and Indonesia decided to strengthen their economic ties, emphasizing on trade, investment, logistics, and services. The agreement was made during a bilateral discussion between Indonesian Deputy Foreign Minister Anis Matta and Cypriot Foreign Minister Constantinos Kombos on the margins of the Manama Dialogue in Bahrain.

On 1 April 2026, the two countries decided to expand bilateral ties in higher education, science, technology, and research. Indonesian Deputy Minister Stella Christie hosted Cypriot Ambassador Nikos Panayiotou in Jakarta, where they collaboratively drafted a Memorandum of Understanding.

== Trade ==
The value of the bilateral trade fell from $51.95 million in 2020 to $28.08 million in 2021. Following a 22.47% rise from 2017 to 2021, there was a drop.

Cyprus's investment realization is currently not noteworthy. The investment value reached its greatest point in the previous five years in 2017 at $6.6 million. The lowest investment value was reported at $254,000 in 2021; however, it has been increasing as high as $1.2 million in the first seven months of 2022. Fishing, mining, lodging and dining, and other services are among the industries that get investments from Cyprus.

== Diplomatic missions ==
- In a desire to increase its diplomatic standing overseas, Cyprus reopened its embassy in Jakarta in October 2023.
- Indonesia is represented in Cyprus through its embassy in Rome, Italy.

== See also ==
- Foreign relations of Cyprus
- Foreign relations of Indonesia
