= Cyprus–United Arab Emirates relations =

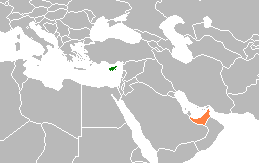

- Cyprus: United Arab Emirates

The United Arab Emirates has an embassy in Nicosia, and Cyprus maintains an embassy in Abu Dhabi and a consulate-general in Dubai. The two countries established diplomatic relations on 6 June 2007. However, they have been cooperating since 1960 on the economic aspect, since they are both located in the Middle East. There are dozens of Cypriot expatriates living and working in the U.A.E., mainly working under the Joannou & Paraskevaides multinational company.

== Cyprus Trade Centre in Dubai ==
As part of attracting foreign direct investment from U.A.E. to Cyprus, the Cypriot Ministry of Commerce, Industry and Tourism opened the non-profit organisation Cyprus Trade Centre in Dubai in 1977.

== See also ==
- Foreign relations of Cyprus
- Foreign relations of the United Arab Emirates
