= Australia–Cyprus relations =

Australian-Cyprus relations

- Australia: Cyprus

Australian-Cyprus relations are foreign relations between Australia and Cyprus. Since 1964, Australia has provided personal and equipment to the UNFICYP. Australia has a High Commission in Nicosia. Cyprus has High Commission in Canberra.

== History ==
The two countries established diplomatic relations in 1973. The strength of bilateral relations between Australia and Cyprus stems from the ties that developed as a result of Cypriot immigration to Australia. Australia hosts the second largest Cypriot diaspora after the United Kingdom. Australia supports the sovereignty and territorial integrity of the Republic of Cyprus and recognises the Republic as the sole legitimate authority on the island. Australia does not recognise the Turkish Republic of Northern Cyprus.

== See also ==
- Foreign relations of Australia
- Foreign relations of Cyprus
- Greek Cypriot diaspora
