= Cyprus–Ireland relations =

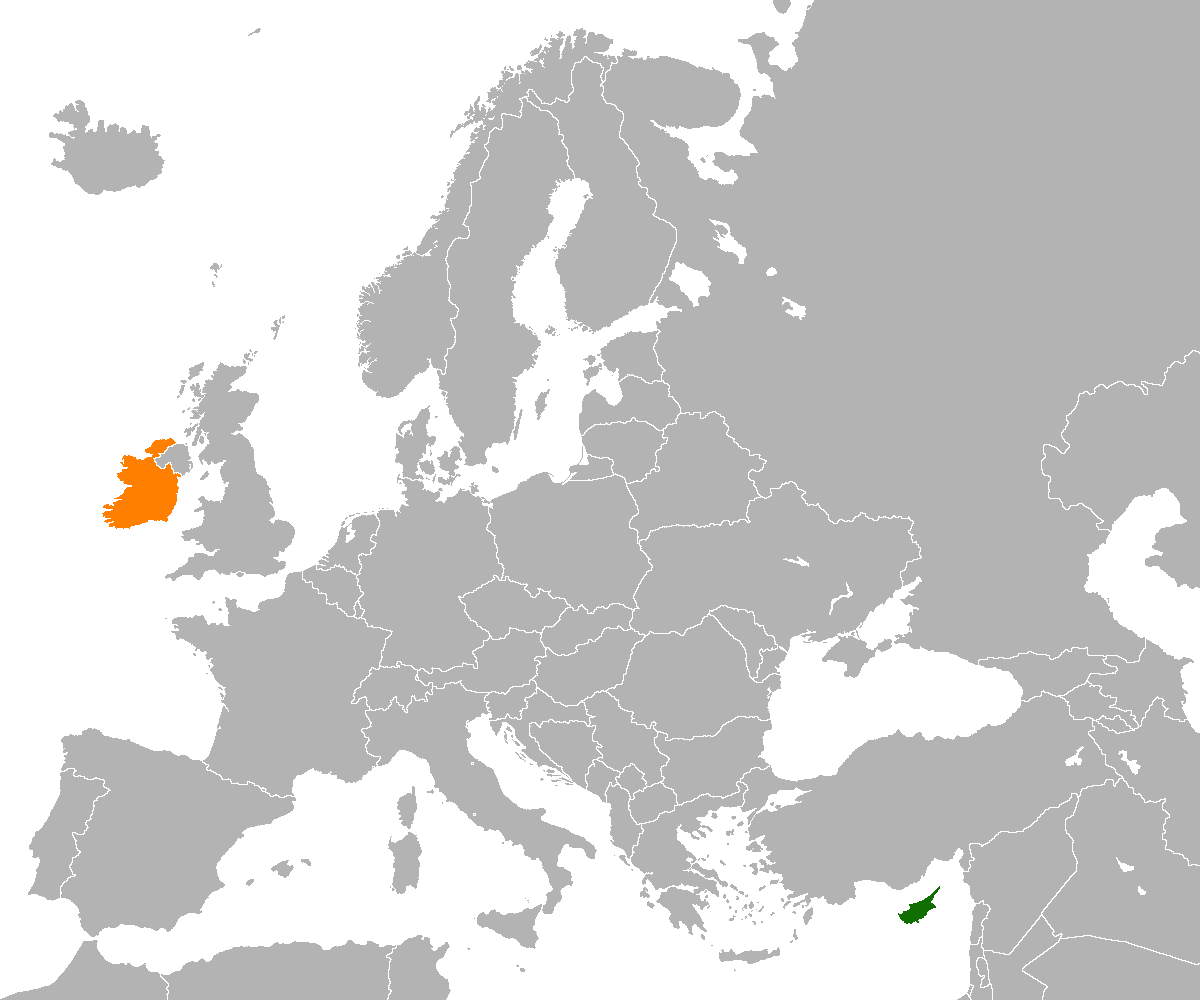

- Cyprus: Ireland

Cyprus–Ireland relations are the bilateral relations between Cyprus and Ireland. Cyprus has an embassy in Dublin, and Ireland maintains an embassy in Nicosia. Both countries are members of the United Nations, the Organization for Security and Co-operation in Europe and the European Union.

== Military relations ==
Almost 10,000 Irish military personnel have been sent to Cyprus as part of the United Nations Peacekeeping Force in Cyprus since 1964.

== High level visits ==
In 1996, Irish Foreign Minister Dick Spring visited Cyprus.

The President of Cyprus Tassos Papadopoulos led a visit of Cypriot politicians and diplomats to Dublin in 2005 to further enhance relations between Ireland and Cyprus. As part of the Cypriot President's visit to Ireland, he officially opened the permanent Cyprus antiques section in the National Museum of Ireland.

Irish President Mary McAleese visited Cyprus in 2006. President of Cyprus Nicos Anastasiades visited Ireland in 2016.

In 2019, Irish President Michael D. Higgins and Irish Minister for Justice and Equality Charles Flanagan visited Cyprus.

In 2022, Irish Minister of State Martin Heydon visited Cyprus.

== Agreements ==
A Double Taxation Treaty between Ireland and Cyprus was signed in 1968.

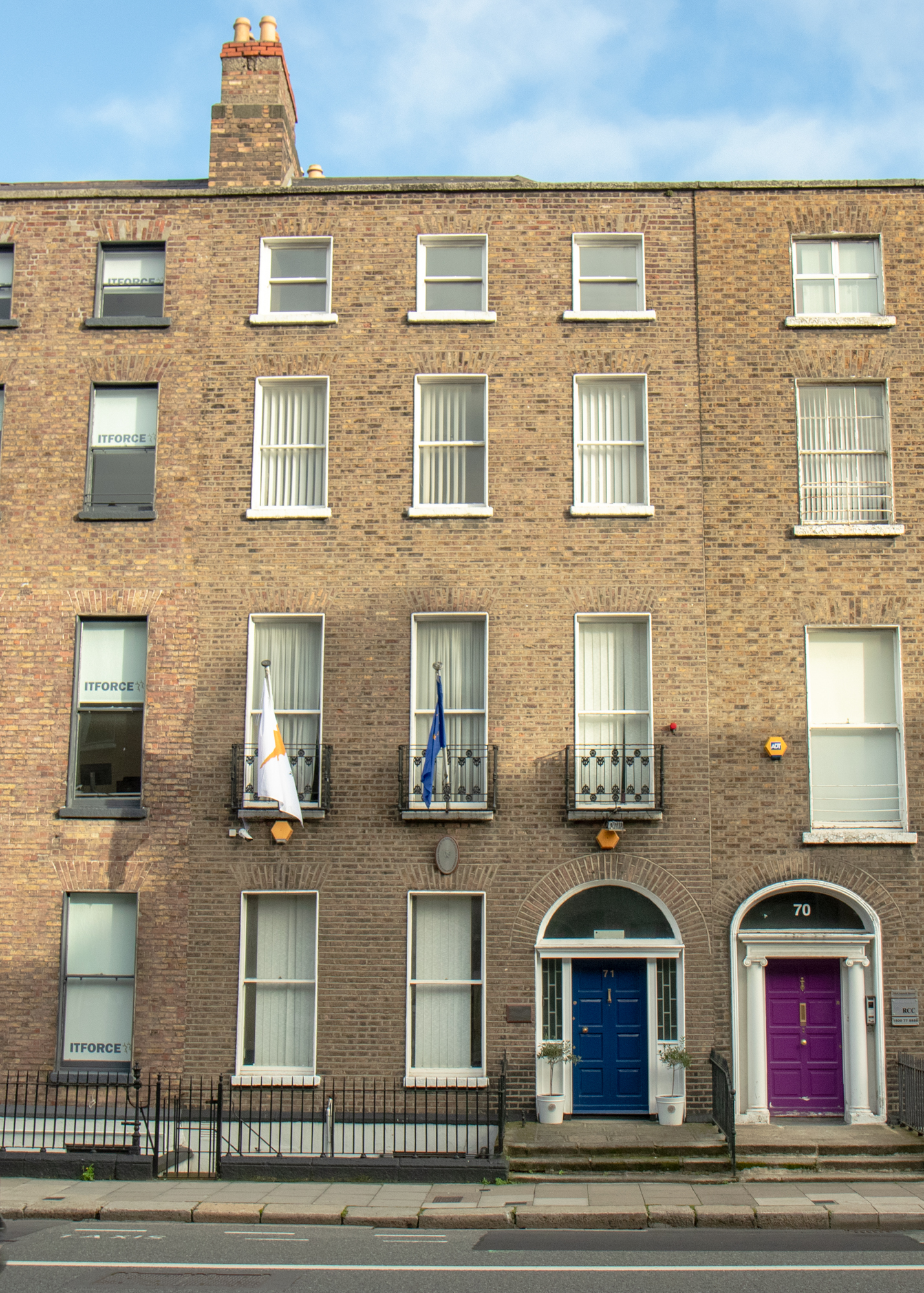
Embassy of Cyprus in Dublin

== Resident diplomatic missions ==
- Cyprus has an embassy in Dublin.
- Ireland has an embassy in Nicosia.

== See also ==
- Foreign relations of Cyprus
- Foreign relations of Ireland
