= Cyprus–Libya relations =

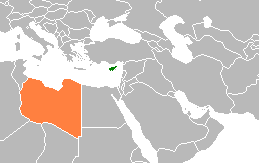

- Cyprus: Libya

Cyprus–Libya relations are the bilateral relations between Republic of Cyprus and Libya. The two countries are members of the United Nations.

== History ==
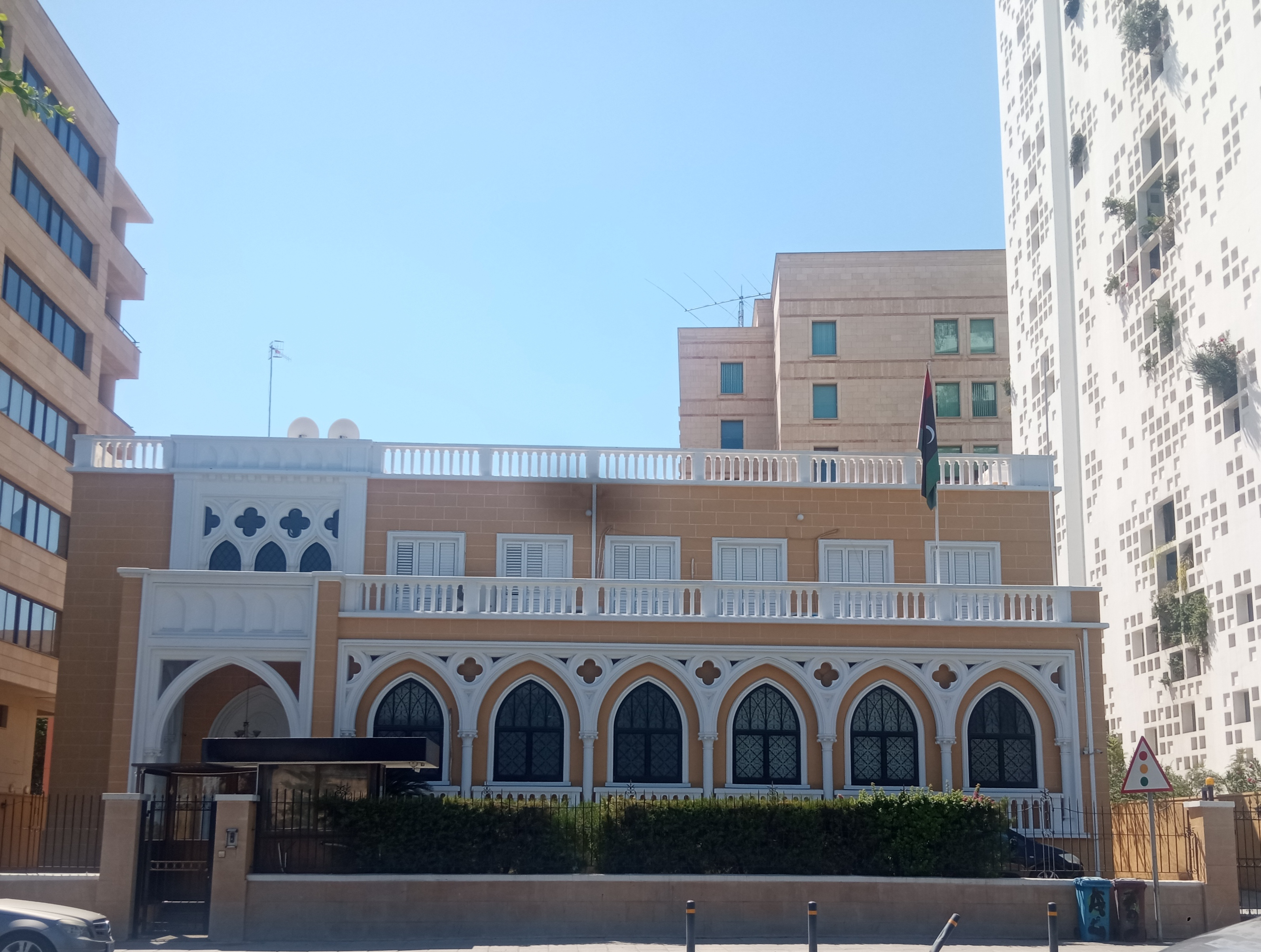
Embassy of Libya in Southern Nicosia

Both countries established diplomatic relations on 8 November 1973. Relations between Cyprus and Libya have always remained strong especially due to the relations of the President of the Cyprus House of Representatives Yiannakis Omirou with Libyan politicians. Libya was a key investor to Cyprus after the invasion of the island by Turkey and was a source of jobs for Cypriots working under the Cypriot multinational company Joannou & Paraskevaides. The latest state visit between the two countries was of Cypriot Foreign Minister Erato Kozakou-Marcoullis to Tripoli in 2011 after the overthrow of the Gaddafi regime.

== Trade ==
In 2016, the value of goods exported from Cyprus to Libya reached a total of 145 million US dollars and included mostly refined oil, but also other diverse goods: sheep, goats, telephones and fruit juices. In the same year, the value of goods exported from Libya to Cyprus reached a total of 6.68 million US dollars and also included mostly refined oil. In addition, Libya exported computer goods of negligible value to Cyprus.

== Residence diplomatic missions ==
- Cyprus is accredited to Libya from its embassy in Cairo
- Libya has an embassy in Nicosia
