= Bulgaria–Cyprus relations =

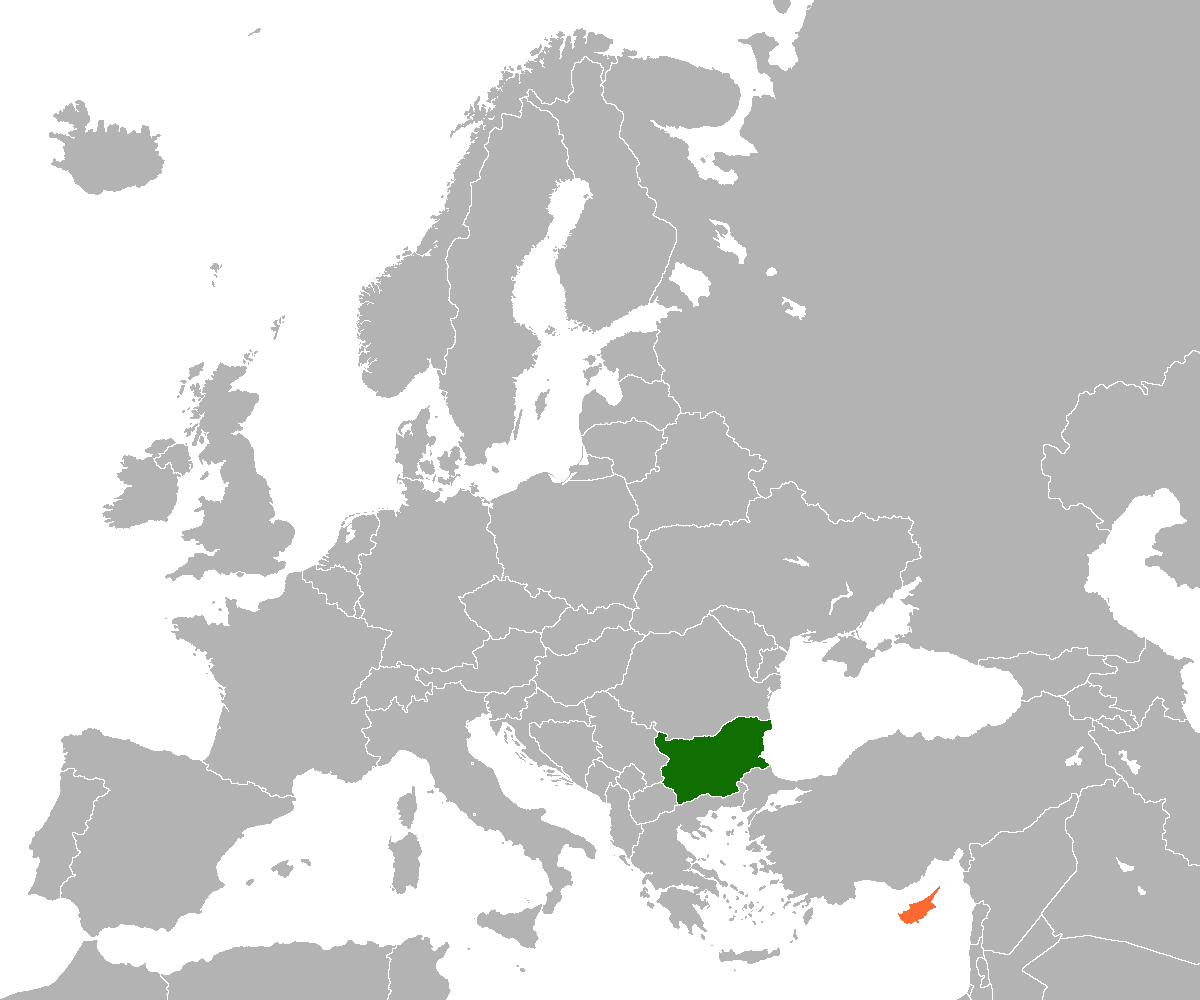

- Bulgaria: Cyprus

Diplomatic mission
- Embassy of Bulgaria, Nicosia: Embassy of Cyprus, Sofia

Bulgaria–Cyprus relations are the close diplomatic relations between Cyprus and Bulgaria. Bulgaria was one of the first countries to recognise Cypriot independence in 1960, leading to the celebration of 50 years of diplomatic relations between the two countries in 2010. These relations have developed positively on the international stage as well as in commerce and strategic affairs. Bulgaria has an embassy in Nicosia and a consulate general in Limassol. Cyprus has an embassy in Sofia and a branch office in Burgas. Both countries are full members of Council of Europe and of the European Union.

== History ==
Ties between the two countries trace two hundred years back when Bulgarian rebels fighting the Ottomans were captured and brought to Nicosia. During their imprisonment, they developed strong friendships with the locals while one captive even wrote an informative diary on Nicosia life in the 1800s.

== Educational relations ==
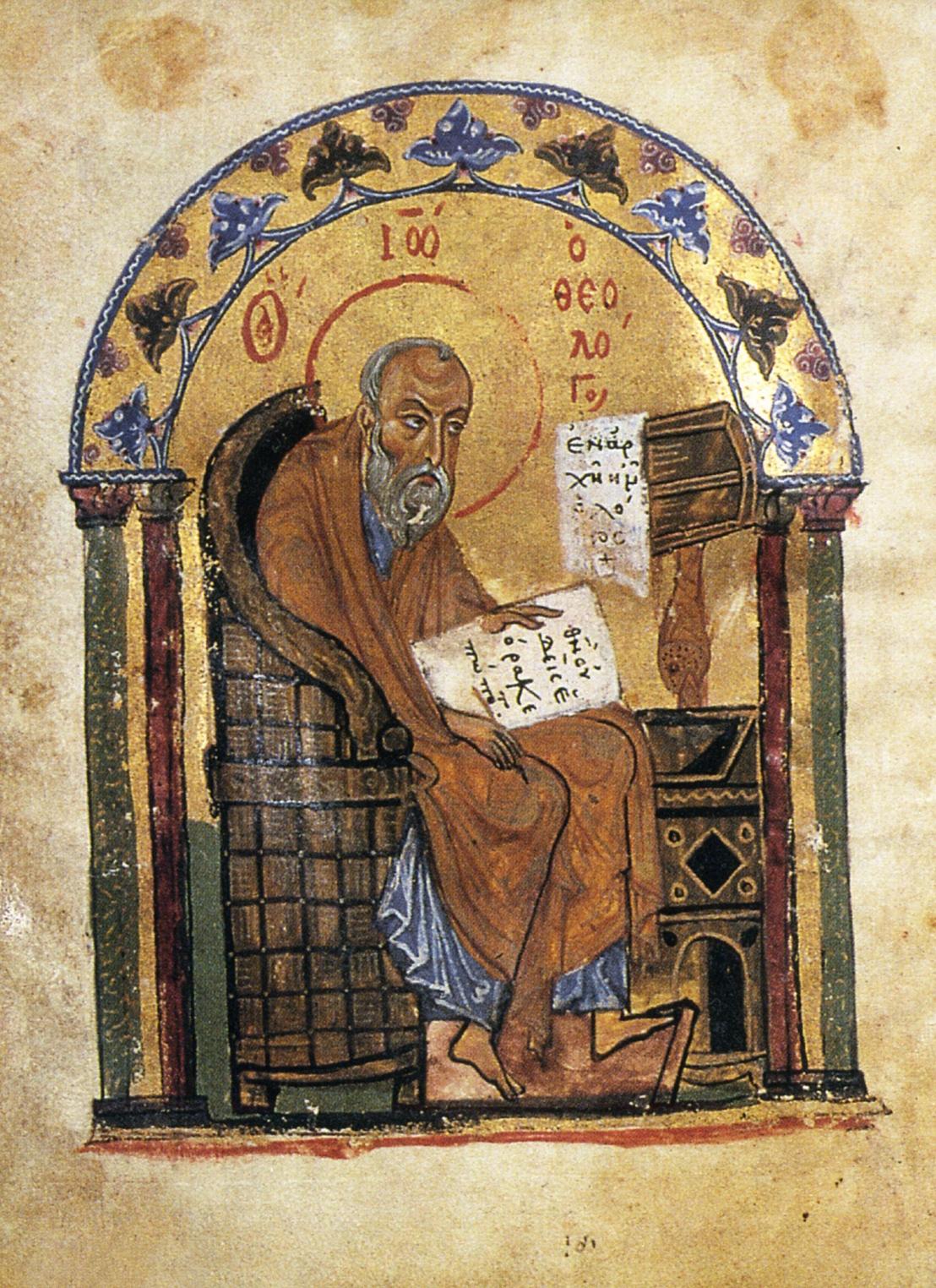
John the Evangelist painting at Dujcev Research Centre in Sofia from Cyprus

In the last five decades, up to 5,000 Cypriot students have gone to Bulgaria on scholarships awarded by the Bulgarian government. Cypriot Labour Minister Sotiroulla Charalambous and government spokesman Stefanos Stefanou are two of the more high-profile Bulgarian-speaking graduates. There are currently around 800 Cypriot students in Bulgaria. Most notably Government spokesman Stefanou studied at the Academy of Social Sciences and Social Administration in Sofia (1984–1989) receiving a degree in political science. During his studies he was actively involved in the Student Movement and served as President of the Student Association of Cypriots in Bulgaria.

== Economic cooperation ==
Cyprus is one of the most powerful investors in Bulgaria, with Cypriot investment reaching €1.7 billion in 2010. An Association under the auspices of the Cyprus Chamber of Commerce and Industry is established with the name "Cyprus-Bulgaria Business Association", aimed to promote, expand and encourage bilateral economic and trade relations.

== Resident diplomatic missions ==
- Bulgaria has an embassy in Nicosia.
- Cyprus has an embassy in Sofia.

== See also ==
- Foreign relations of Bulgaria
- Foreign relations of Cyprus
- Cyprus-NATO relations
- NATO-EU relations
