= Cyprus–Spain relations =

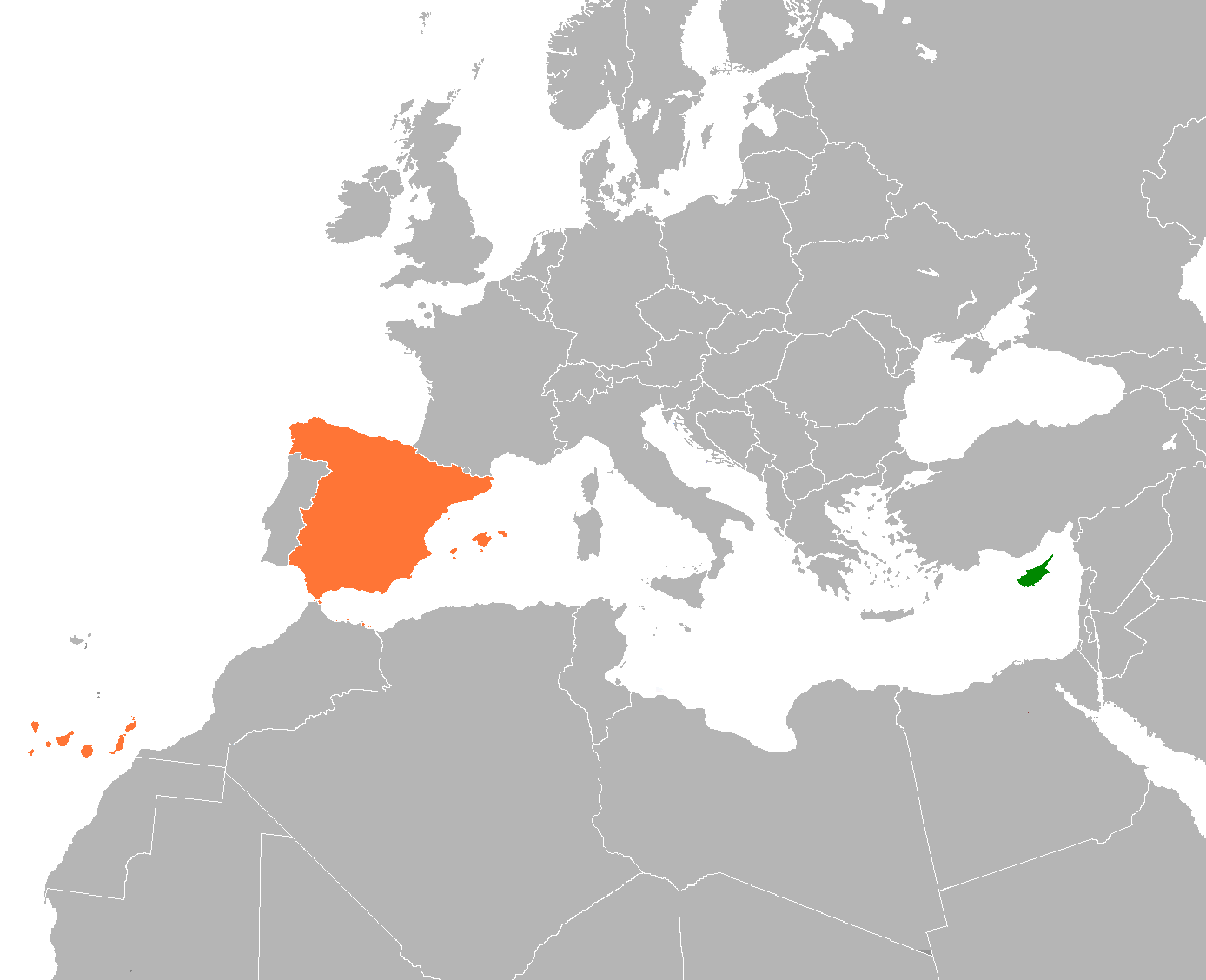
- Cyprus: Spain

Diplomatic mission
- Embassy of Cyprus, Madrid: Embassy of Spain, Nicosia

Cyprus–Spain relations are the bilateral relations between Cyprus and Spain. The relations are defined mainly by the membership of both countries to the European Union, Council of Europe and Organization for Security and Co-operation in Europe, and the Union for the Mediterranean. Cyprus has an embassy in Madrid and consulates in Barcelona, Bilbao, Sevilla and Granada. Spain has an embassy in Nicosia.

== History ==
Spain and Cyprus established diplomatic relations on 22 December 1967. The Council of Ministers of 18 January 2002 appointed Ignacio García-Valdecasas as Spain's first ambassador in Nicosia, covering, with the opening of the Spanish Embassy in that capital, an institutional vacuum that until then, he had been feeling the task of adequately promoting the important relations existing with the Republic of Cyprus.

On the other hand, Cyprus inaugurated its embassy in Madrid in 1992, being previously its embassy in Paris the one in charge to develop the relations with Spain. The first official visit of a Cypriot president to Spain goes back to July 1987, when Spyros Kyprianou met with the president Felipe González and was guest of honor at a dinner hosted by the King of Spain.

The first visit of a Spanish president to Cyprus was that of José María Aznar, in February 2002, when he reiterated, on behalf of the European Union (presided over then by Spain), the validity of the agreements adopted at the Helsinki summit in 1991 to negotiate the accession of Cyprus, even if the reunification of the two areas in which the country is divided has not taken place.

Queen Sofía inaugurated 10 March 2010 in Nicosia the exhibition "Miró de Mallorca", an anthology of the last 20 years of the painter's work in the Spanish island of the Mediterranean.

These elements are but examples of the harmony and excellent relations between Spain and Cyprus. Invited by his counterpart Yiannakis Omirou, president of the Congress of Deputies, Jesús Posada, made an official visit to Cyprus between 13 and 14 July 2015, during which he was interviewed, in addition to Omirou, with the Minister of Foreign Affairs, Ioannis Kasoulides, and with the mayor of Nicosia, Constantinos Yiorkadjis.

Due to their geographical situation, both countries share, in addition, a special interest for the Mediterranean basin and especially support the policy of common neighborhood of the European Union in this region. At the end of 2013, Cyprus and Spain promoted the creation of a "Mediterranean Group" of consultation and consultation within the European Union. The first ministerial meeting of this group, in which seven countries participate, took place in Brussels in December 2013, while the second was held in Alicante in April 2014. existing between Spain and Cyprus.

== 2026 Iran war ==
During the 2026 Iran War, Cyprus was attacked by Iranian drones, mainly targeting RAF Akrotiri. Following this attack, several European countries sent military help to Cyprus. On 5 March, 2026, Spain sent one of its advanced frigates to help defend Cyprus from further attacks.

== Resident diplomatic missions ==
- Cyprus has an embassy in Madrid.
- Spain has an embassy in Nicosia.

== See also ==
- Foreign relations of Cyprus
- Foreign relations of Spain
- Cyprus-NATO relations
- NATO-EU relations
