= Cyprus–Czech Republic relations =

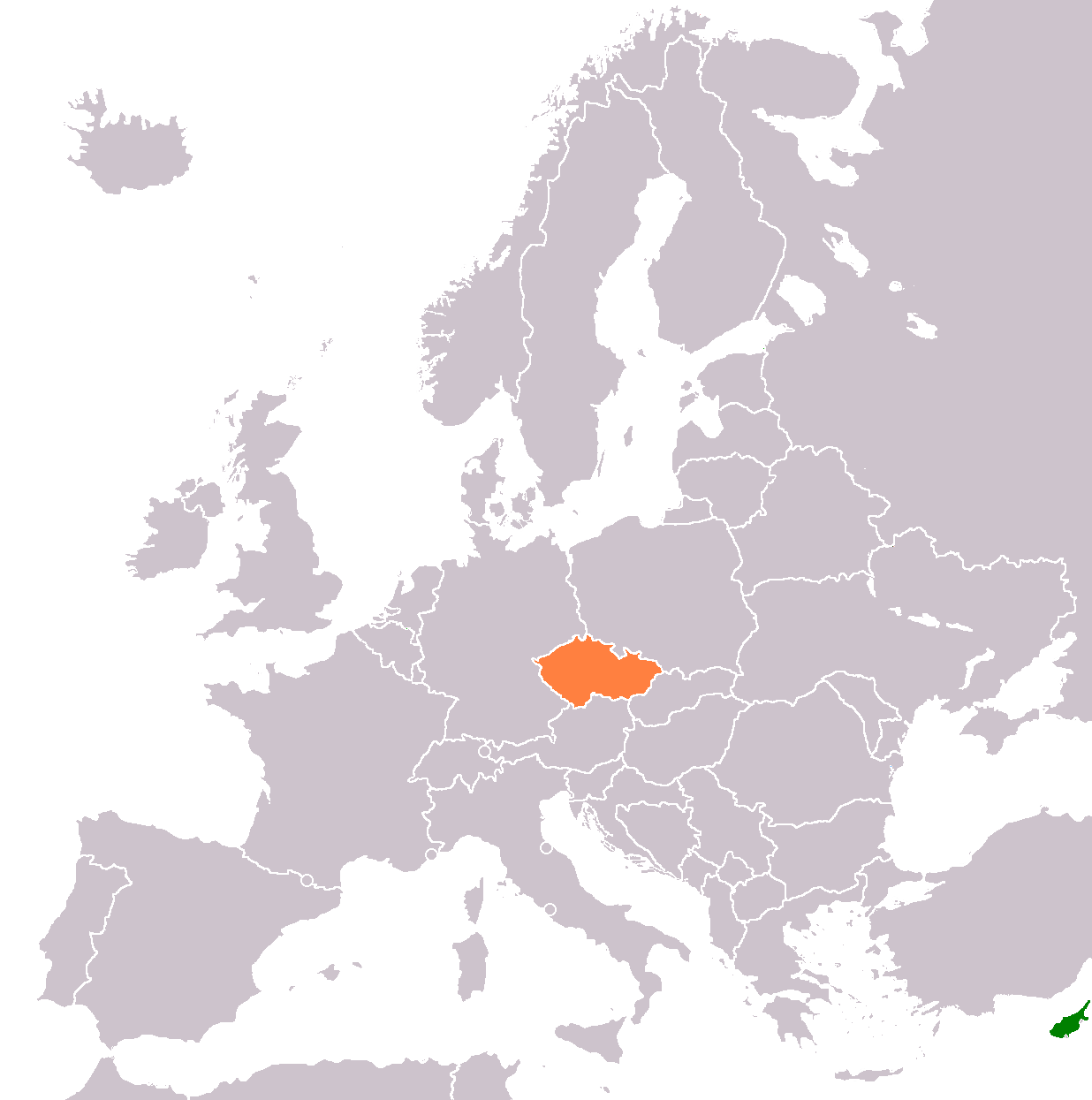
- Cyprus: Czech Republic

Cyprus–Czech Republic relations are the bilateral relations between Cyprus and the Czech Republic. Cyprus has an embassy in Prague. The Czech Republic has an embassy in Nicosia. Both countries are full members of the European Union and the Council of Europe. The two countries joined the European Union in 2004.

== High level visits ==
President of the House of Representatives of Cyprus Demetris Christofias made an official visit to Czech Republic in 2007.

== See also ==
- Foreign relations of Cyprus
- Foreign relations of the Czech Republic
- 2004 enlargement of the European Union
