= Cyprus–Sweden relations =

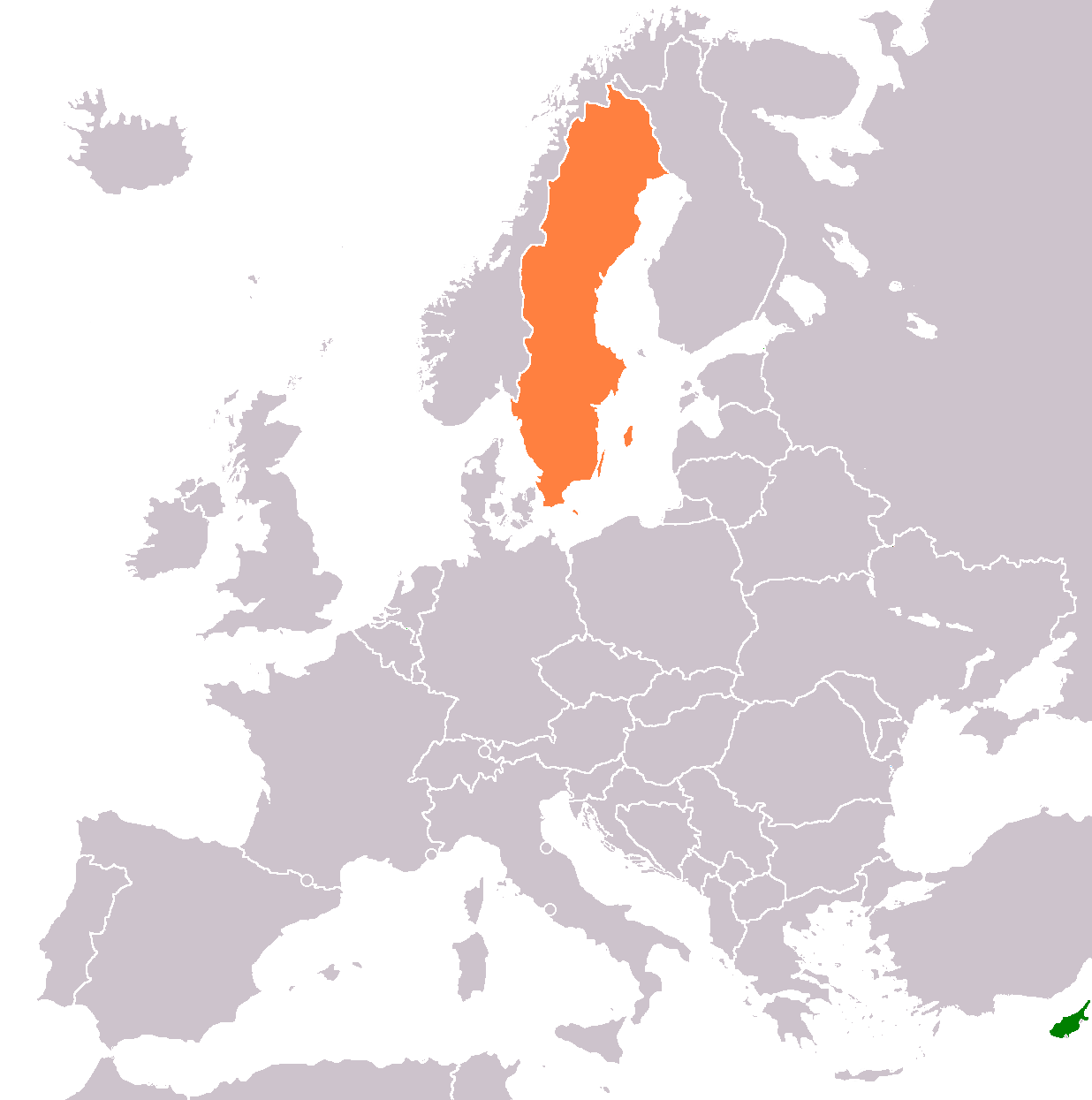
- Cyprus: Sweden

Cyprus–Sweden relations are foreign relations between Cyprus and Sweden. The two countries are members of the EU, COE, OSCE and UN. Cyprus has an embassy in Stockholm. Sweden has an embassy in Nicosia (Cyprus).

== History ==
On the occasion of Cyprus' declaration of independence on 16 August 1960, Swedish Foreign Minister Östen Undén sent a congratulatory telegram to Cypriot Foreign Minister Nikos Kranidiotis, stating that the Swedish government recognized Cyprus as a sovereign and independent state. He expressed his hope for friendly and cordial relations between the two countries. At the same time, congratulatory telegrams were also sent to Cyprus' President, Archbishop Makarios III, by King Gustaf VI Adolf. In October of the same year, Sweden and Cyprus reached an agreement to establish diplomatic relations.

In 1994 Cyprus opened an embassy in Stockholm, while Sweden opened an embassy in Nicosia in 2004.

Eighth bilateral agreements have been concluded between Cyprus and Sweden.

== Swedish archaeologists in Cyprus ==
Swedish archeologists and historians visit the island systematically. The most significant project was called Swedish Cyprus Expedition that took place between September 1927 and March 1931 and was led by three archaeologists: Einar Gjerstad, Erik Sjöqvist and Alfred Westholm together with architect John Lindros.

== Resident diplomatic missions ==
- Cyprus has an embassy in Stockholm.
- Sweden has an embassy in Nicosia.
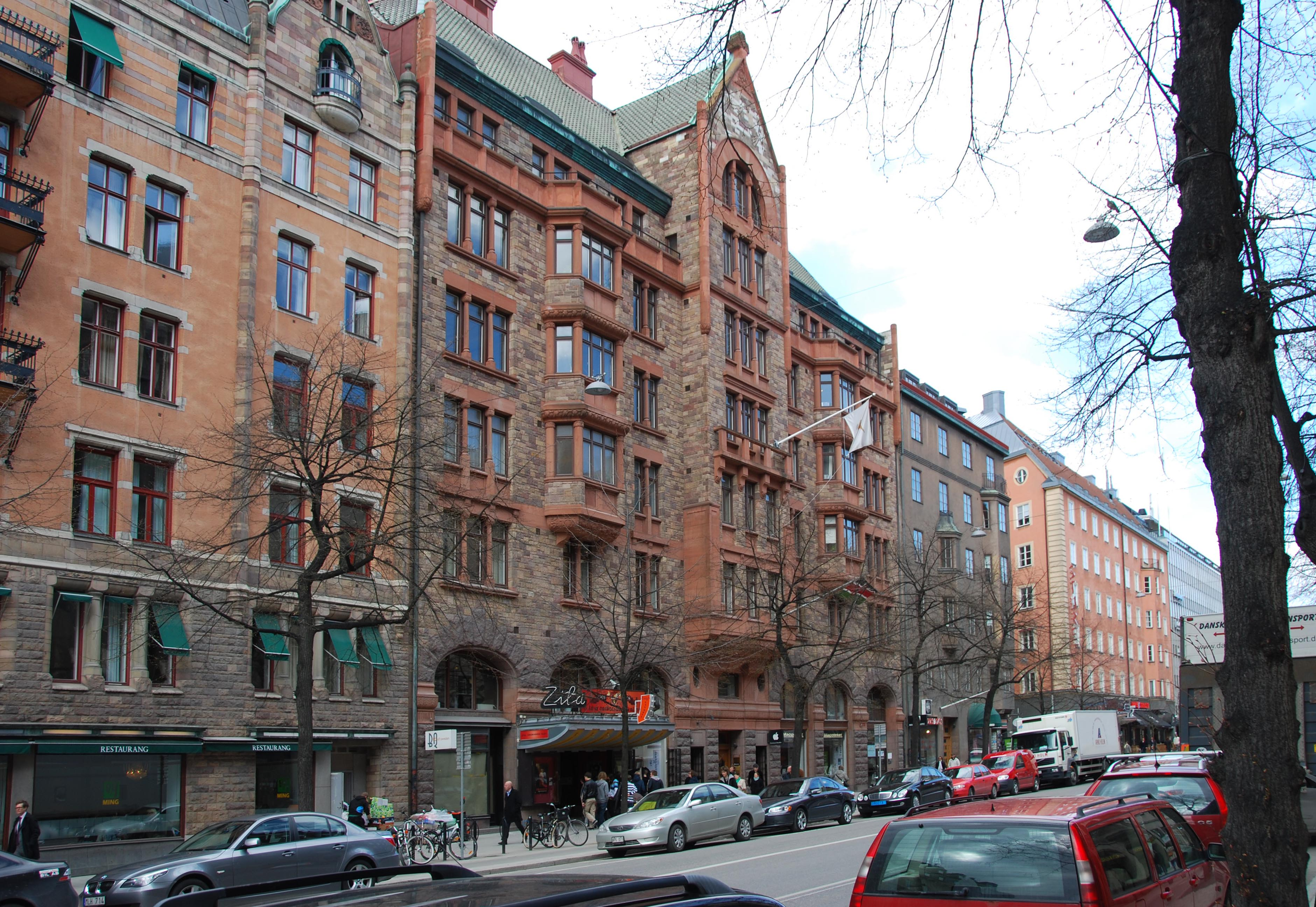
Embassy of Cyprus in Stockholm

== See also ==
- Foreign relations of Cyprus
- Foreign relations of Sweden
