= Cyprus–Denmark relations =

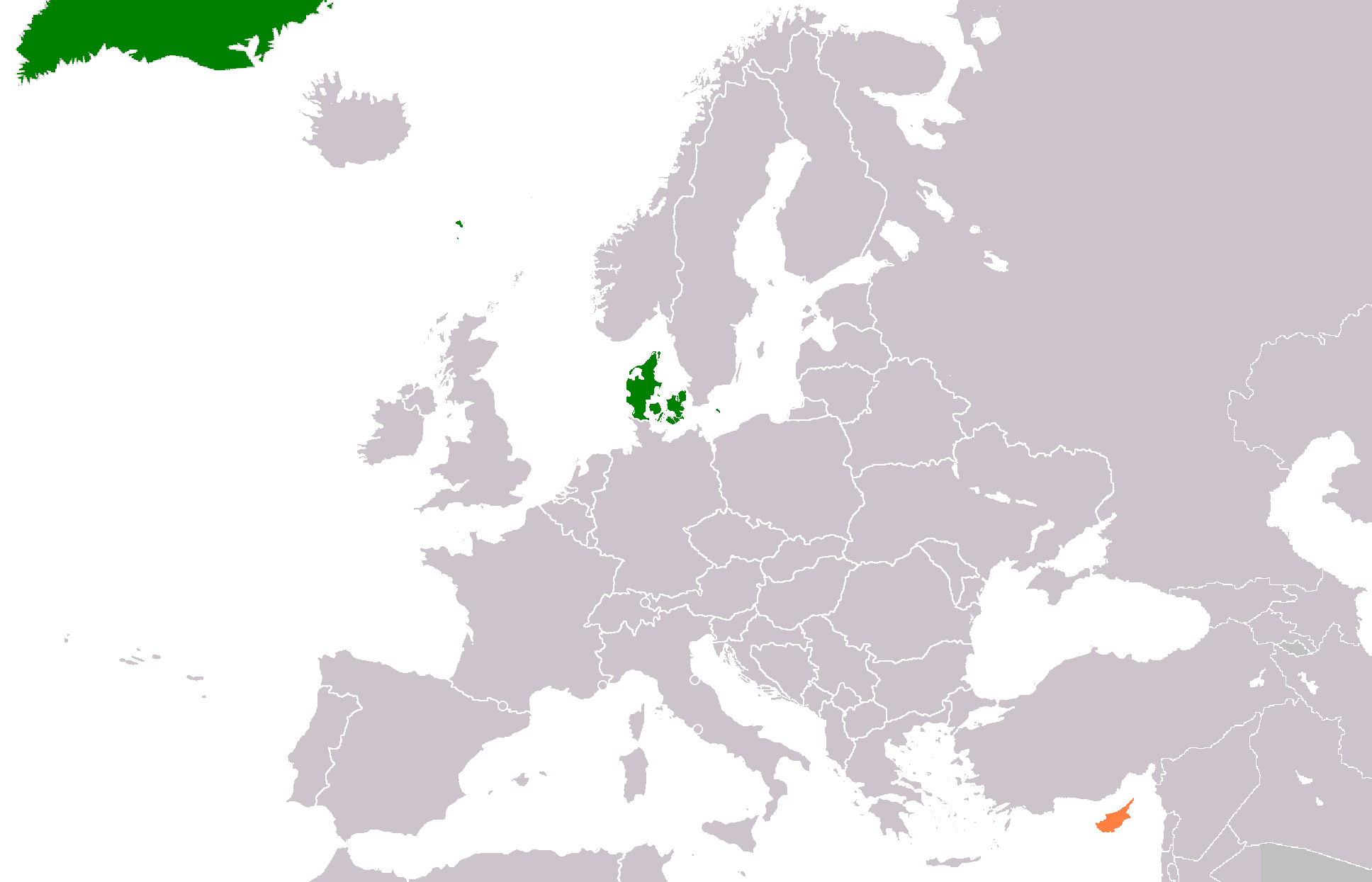
- Denmark: Cyprus

Cyprus–Denmark relations refers to the bilateral relations between Cyprus and Denmark. Cyprus has an embassy in Copenhagen. Denmark has an embassy in Nicosia. Diplomatic relations were established on 2 November 1960. Both countries are members of the European Union.

In 1990, Denmark sent 342 soldiers for the United Nations Peacekeeping Force in Cyprus. The Danish soldiers were organized as infantry battalions. In 2004, Denmark opened an embassy in Cyprus.

Leaders of the Cyprus, Denmark and Poland are committed to joint action on the economic crisis and the EU's 2014-2020 budget.

An air transport agreement were signed between Cyprus and Denmark on 27 April 1963. In May 1981, Cyprus and Denmark signed a tax treaty.

Cypriot President Glafcos Clerides visited Denmark in June 2002, to hold talks on Cyprus' EU accession, the Cyprus dispute and the bilateral relations between Cyprus and Denmark. In August 2006, Danish Prime Minister Anders Fogh Rasmussen visited the United Nations Buffer Zone in Cyprus.

== See also ==
- Foreign relations of Cyprus
- Foreign relations of Denmark
