= Croatia–Cyprus relations =

- Croatia: Cyprus

Croatia and Cyprus established diplomatic relations on February 4, 1993. The Croatian embassy in Rome (Italy) is also accredited as a non resident embassy to Cyprus. The Cypriot embassy in Vienna (Austria) is also accredited as a non resident embassy to Croatia. Both countries are full members of the Council of Europe and the European Union.

On 11 March 2021, the Minister of Foreign affairs of Croatia visited the Minister of Foreign affairs of Cyprus to strengthen their relationship and focus on a number of economic issues.

== History ==
Cyprus gave full support to Croatia's European Union membership process.

== See also ==
- Foreign relations of Croatia
- Foreign relations of Cyprus
- Cyprus–Yugoslavia relations

== Links ==
Croatian Ministry of Foreign Affairs: list of bilateral treaties with Cyprus
