= Cyprus–Germany relations =

- Cyprus: Germany

Diplomatic mission
- Embassy of Cyprus, Berlin: Embassy of Germany, Nicosia

Cyprus–Germany relations are the bilateral relations between Cyprus and Germany. Germany is represented in Cyprus through its embassy in Nicosia, Cyprus. Cyprus is represented in Germany through its embassy in Berlin, Germany. Both countries are members of the European Union, Council of Europe and Organization for Security and Co-operation in Europe. Germany fully supported Cyprus's application to join the European Union, which concluded with membership on 1 May 2004.

== History ==
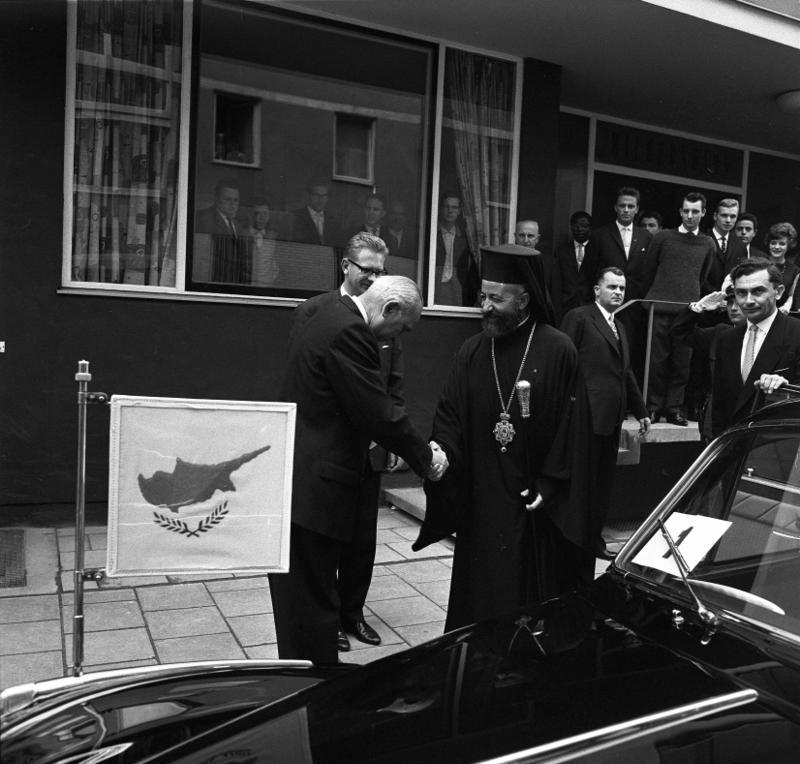
Cyprus former President Makarios III at a state visit in Munich with the German Chancellor in 1962

The Federal Republic of Germany established diplomatic relations with the young Republic of Cyprus on 20 August 1960, the fifth country to do so. Cyprus had gained independence on 16 August 1960. Cyprus' accession to the European Union on 1 May 2004 gave relations between the two countries a new dimension. Highlight of the period were the several bilateral Agreements signed and the visits paid in Bonn by Makarios and Kucuk. Germany was satisfied with the development of the relations, although at the same time concerned about the influence of the "East" influences on Cyprus.

== Political relations ==
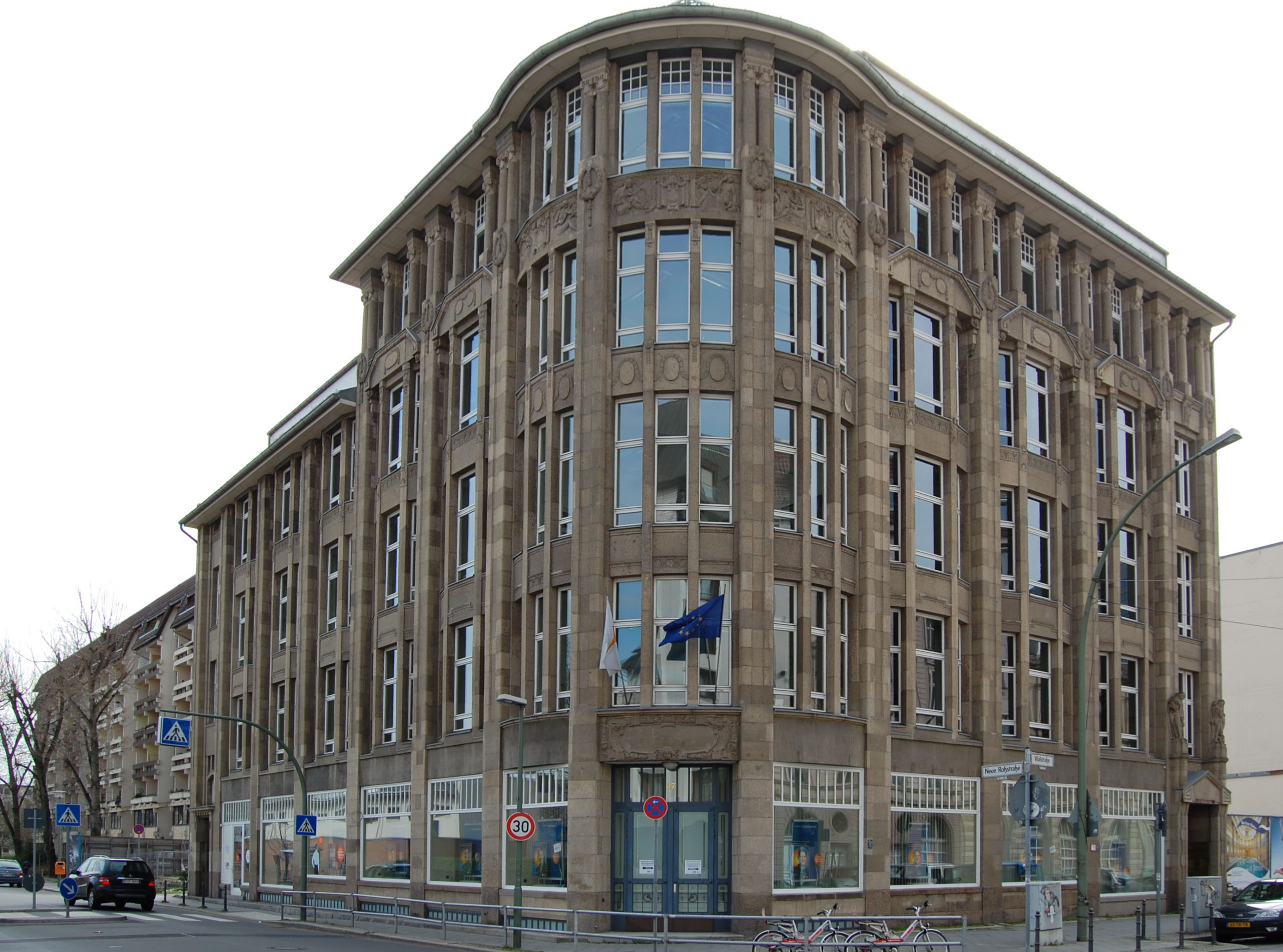
Embassy of Cyprus in Berlin

Federal Foreign Minister Guido Westerwelle visited Cyprus on 22 and 23 July 2010 and Federal Chancellor Angela Merkel also paid a visit in Nicosia on 11 January 2011. Talks focused on developments in the ongoing negotiations between the two Cypriot communities on the island's reunification and Turkey's EU accession process. There is also lively exchange at parliamentary level. The German Bundestag's German-Cypriot Parliamentary Friendship Group visited Cyprus in October 2011 and the German Bundestag 's Committee on the Affairs of the European Union visited the country in early July 2012 at the beginning of Cyprus' EU Presidency.

== Economic relations ==
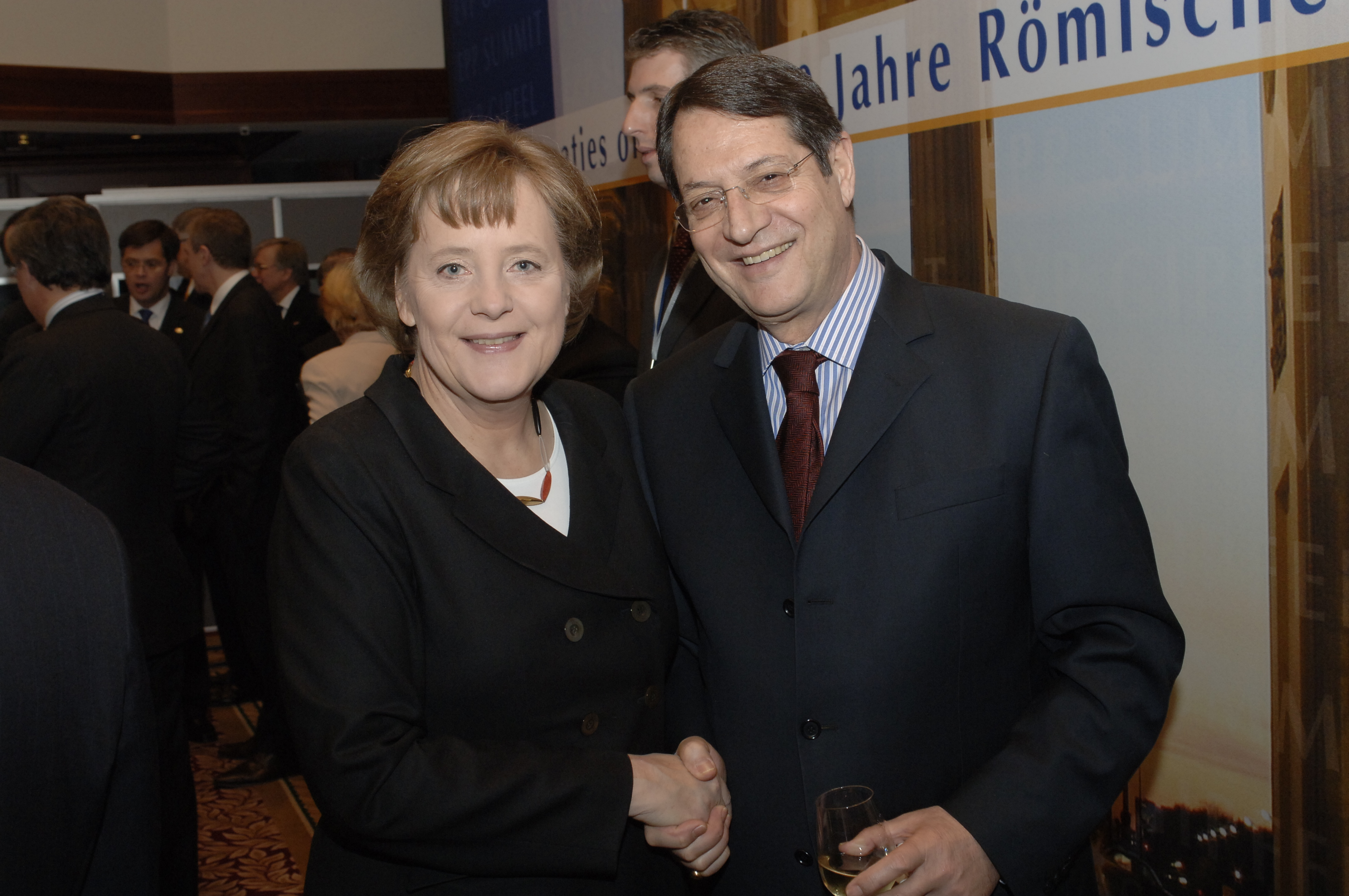
Angela Merkel with Nicos Anastasiades in 2007 EPP summit

Soon after Cyprus gained its independence, a trade and economic agreement was concluded between the two countries in 1961, followed by an air transport agreement (1967), a double taxation agreement (1974) and an agreement on cross-border passenger and freight transport (1980). The bulk of these agreements became EU law in 1987 which, since Cyprus' accession to the EU on 1 May 2004, now also applies in Cyprus. The renegotiated double taxation agreement was signed in Nicosia on 18 February 2011. Negotiations are currently under way on a bilateral security of information agreement.

In 2011, German foreign trade statistics recorded an export surplus of EUR 502.5 million in Germany's favour, German exports to Cyprus totalling EUR 742.2 million and German imports from Cyprus EUR 239.7 million. Germany is Cyprus' third largest supplier of goods, after Greece and Italy, and the second most important destination for Cyprus' exports (after Greece), taking 9 per cent of total exports. In the tourist industry, an important sector for Cyprus, Germany ranked third in 2010 with 139,000 visitors, after the United Kingdom (approximately 1 million visitors) and Russia (223,000). There is especially close cooperation between Cyprus and Germany in the shipping sector. Many German shipping companies and shipping management businesses are based in Limassol in Cyprus. According to figures presented at the Cyprus Shipping Association's Annual General Meeting, the shipping sector accounts for between 7 and 8 per cent of the country's GDP. Cyprus operates the world's ten-largest fleet and a total of some 2,400 vessels are owned or operated by member companies of the Cyprus Shipping Chamber (CSC). Currently, the shipping industry provides 4,500 onshore jobs and employs some 55,000 seafarers.

== Cultural relations ==
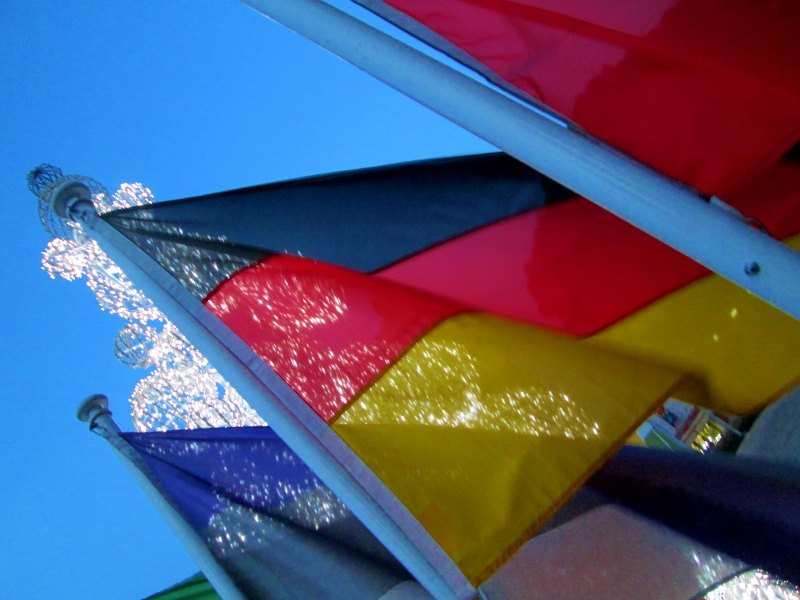
The German flag waiving outside Nicosia city hall during Christmas.

The cornerstone of cultural relations between Germany and Cyprus is the Goethe Institute in Nicosia, which was re-opened in July 2011 after being closed for more than ten years. There is a cultural association for each community (the German-Cypriot Cultural Association in the South and the German-Turkish Cypriot Cultural Association in the North). Both cooperate closely with the Goethe Institute and the German Embassy. Further German-Cypriot groups (German teachers and alumni associations) contribute to German cultural offerings on the island. A cultural agreement with the Republic of Cyprus was concluded in 1971.

German as a foreign language is less popular amongst the Greek Cypriots than it is in the North of the island. The range of foreign languages offered at Cyprus' schools is currently being revised as part of curricular reform. It is planned to offer German, along with other (European) foreign languages, as an optional subject from grammar school level upwards, after English as a compulsory foreign language and French as a semi-compulsory foreign language. The Cyprus Teachers of German Association (www.zdv-online.org) is giving its full support to this project.

In Northern Cyprus of the island, German can be chosen as the second foreign language, along with 12 other languages. However, interest in German as a foreign language has declined there since pupils have been able to drop foreign languages in favour of other subjects.

Interest in the German language continues to grow, as evidenced by enrolment figures at the Goethe Institute and private language schools. The attractiveness of Germany as a place to study (low tuition fees, high quality of education and good career opportunities) is increasingly drawing the attention of Cypriot students, scientists and academics. In 2011, for example, the Max Planck Society and the Cyprus Institute signed a Memorandum of Understanding that, among other things, will promote research cooperation.

Many Cypriots from the two communities have studied in Germany, often with scholarships from the German Academic Exchange Service (DAAD), the Alexander von Humboldt Foundation and other foundations. A centre for Interdisciplinary Cypriot Studies was established at the University of Münster in May 1997 and DAAD academic teachers have been working at the University of Cyprus since the 2003 winter semester. Additional German lecturers at other higher education institutions in the island's north and south are helping to intensify existing academic contacts, foster new ones and arouse interest in studying in Germany.

In 2004, an agreement on mutual recognition of university degrees (equivalency agreement) was signed. This is designed to facilitate Cypriot and German students' admission to German and Cypriot universities and the subsequent recognition of university degrees obtained at these institutions in the respective partner country.

== Asylum seekers ==
In December 2022, German Chancellor Olaf Scholz conveyed to Cypriot President Nicos Anastasiades that Germany intended welcome 500 asylum seekers from Cyprus. Following this, 48 applicants for international protection were relocated from Cyprus to Germany for voluntary relocation. These asylum seekers were from Syria and Afghanistan.

== Resident diplomatic missions ==
- Cyprus has an embassy in Berlin.
- Germany has an embassy in Nicosia.
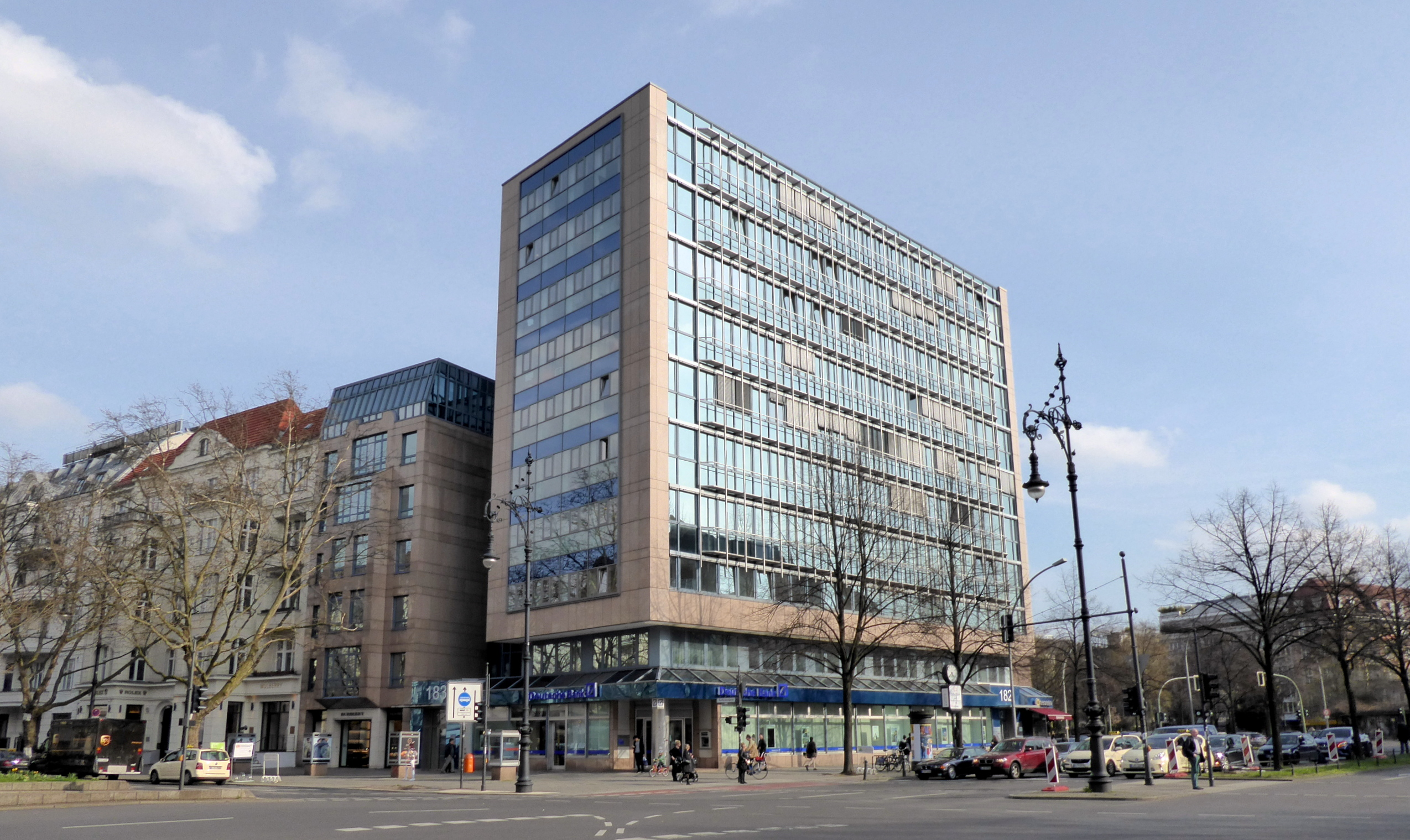
Embassy of Cyprus in Berlin

== See also ==
- Foreign relations of Cyprus
- Foreign relations of Germany
