= List of ambassadors of Cyprus to the United States =

Coordinates: 38.912806°N 77.049389°W

Ambassador of Cyprus to United States Embassy of Cyprus in Washington, D.C.
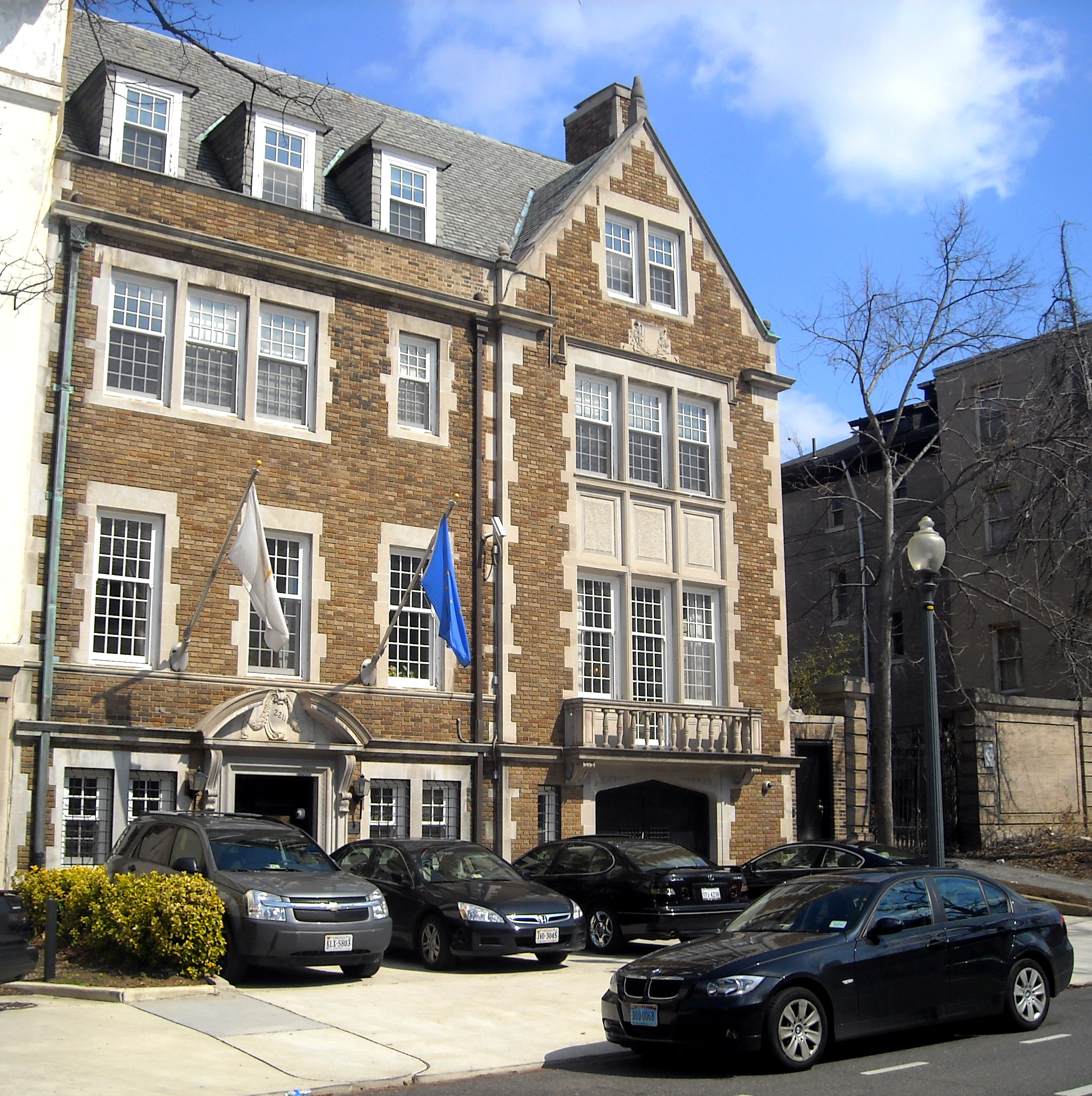
- Incumbent; Leonidas Pantelides since June 27, 2016
- Inaugural holder: Zenon Rossides
- Formation: October 31, 1960

The Cypriot ambassador in Washington, D. C. is the official representative of the Government in Nicosia to the Government of the United States.

== List of representatives ==
Diplomatic agrément	Diplomatic accreditation	Ambassador	Greek language	Observations	President of Cyprus	List of presidents of the United States	Term end
October 31, 1960				EMBASSY OPENED	Makarios III	Dwight D. Eisenhower	
October 18, 1960	October 31, 1960	Zenon Rossides	Ζήνων Ρωσσίδης	(Λάρνακα 1895 - Νέα Υόρκη 1990) represented Cyprus at the United Nations for two decades, died Tuesday at Doctors Hospital after a stroke. He was 95 years old and lived in Manhattan. Mr. Rossides became his country's first delegate to the United Nations when Cyprus achieved	Makarios III	Dwight D. Eisenhower	
January 14, 1974	February 1, 1974	Nicos G. Dimitriou	Νίκος Γ Δημητρίου	(* born in Larnaca, Cyprus, on July 20, 1920. Aug 11, 1981) died today in Cyprus after a cerebral hemorrhage, has been minister of commerce and industry, chairman of the Electricity	Glafkos Klerides	Gerald Ford	
July 6, 1979	July 24, 1979	Andreas J. Jacovides	Ανδρέας Ι Ιακωβίδης	(*Nicosia, Cyprus, on 19 December 1936) graduated with distinction from the Pancyprian Gymnasium in 1954.	Spyros Kyprianou	Jimmy Carter	
July 14, 1989	August 3, 1989	Michael E. Sherifis	Μιχαήλ Ε. Σεριφης		Georges Vassiliou	George H. W. Bush	
September 20, 1993	October 1, 1993	Andreas J. Jacovides	Ανδρέας Ι Ιακωβίδης		Glafkos Klerides	Bill Clinton	
December 12, 1996	February 11, 1997	Andrew Nicolaides	Andrew Νικολαΐδης		Glafkos Klerides	Bill Clinton	
September 4, 1998	September 10, 1998	Erato Kozakou-Marcoullis	Ερατώ Κοζάκου-Μαρκουλλή		Glafkos Klerides	Bill Clinton	
October 31, 2003	December 4, 2003	Euripides L. Evriviades	Ευριπίδης Ευρυβιάδης L.	ambassador to the Netherlands	Tassos Papadopoulos	George W. Bush	
December 6, 2006	December 8, 2006	Andreas S. Kakouris	Ανδρέας Σ Κακούρη		Tassos Papadopoulos	George W. Bush	
September 8, 2010	September 16, 2010	Pavlos Anastasiades	Παύλος Αναστασιάδης		Demetris Christofias	Barack Obama	
May 30, 2013	July 18, 2013	Georgios Chacalli	Γεώργιος ΤΣΑΚΑΛΗΣ		Nicos Anastasiades	Barack Obama	
	June 27, 2016	Leonidas Pantelides			Nicos Anastasiades	Barack Obama	

- Cyprus–United States relations
