= History of the Jews in Cyprus =

The location of Cyprus (dark and medium green) in relation to European Union and Asia

The history of the Jews in Cyprus dates back at least to the 2nd century BCE, when a considerable number of Jews in Cyprus was first recorded. The Jews had close relationships with many of the other religious groups on the island and were seen favourably by the island's Roman rulers. During the war over the city of Ptolemais between Alexander Jannaeus and King Lathyros, many Jews remained committed to King Lathyros and were subsequently killed.

== Early presence ==
Cyprus attracted Jewish immigrants from at least the 4th century BCE, as evidenced by Phoenician inscriptions carrying names such as Haggai son of Abdi and Shalom son of Asaphyahu, who held the title of chief of scribes. Jewish immigration likely increased after 12 BCE, when Herod the Great, who ruled Judaea as a client kingdom of Rome, secured a grant from Emperor Augustus granting him half the revenues of the Cypriot copper mines, opening up new economic opportunities that would have drawn migrants from Judaea and beyond.

== Jewish rebellions and Byzantine rule ==
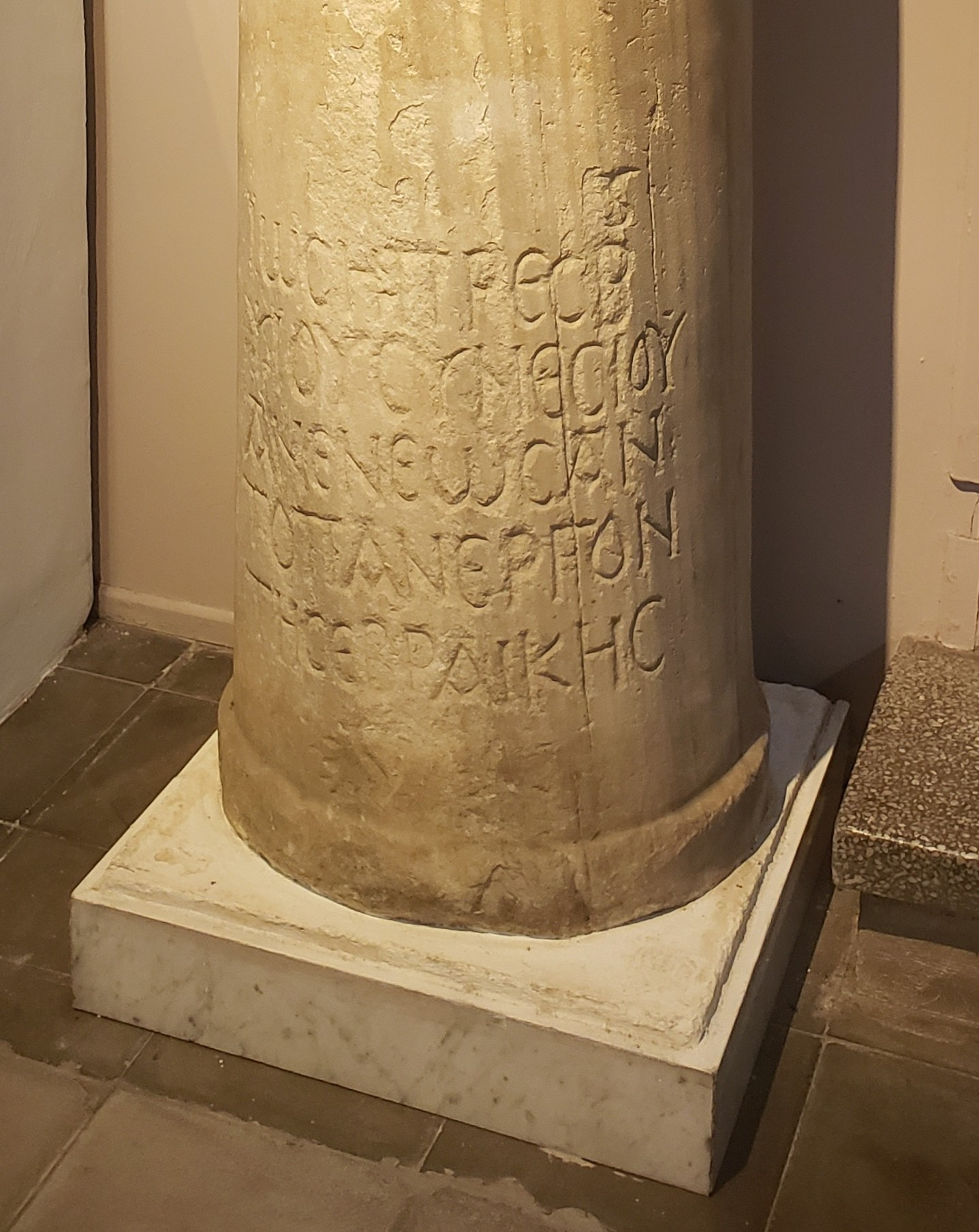
A column referring to the restoration of a synagogue in Athienou attests to the Jewish presence in Cyprus in the 6th century

The Jews lived well in Cyprus during Roman rule. Christianity was preached to the Jews in Cyprus at an early date, with St Paul being the first and the Apostle Barnabas (a native of Cyprus) the second. They attempted to convert the Jews to Christianity. Aristobulus of Britannia, the first bishop of Britain, was the brother of Barnabas.

Jewish immigrants participated in the Diaspora Revolt against the Romans and their leader Trajan in 117 CE under the leadership of Artemion. They sacked Salamis and annihilated the Greek population. According to Roman historian Cassius Dio, the revolting party massacred 240,000 Greek-Cypriots. Cassius Dio also reported that Jews were not allowed to settle on Cyprus after the uprising was put down. The law was applied so strictly in the centuries that followed that any Jew who wrecked his ship off the coast of Cyprus was executed right away. Jewish settlement in Cyprus appears to have completely halted until the fourth century CE.

According to a late source, written by Eutychius of Alexandria, the Jewish diaspora attacked Christian monasteries on the island during the reign of Heraclius (610–641).

Twice in 649 and 653, when the population was overwhelmingly Christian, Cyprus was subjected to two raids by Arab forces which resulted in the capture and enslavement of many Cypriots. One story relates that an enslaved Jew in Syria managed to escape and seek sanctuary in Cyprus, where he converted and settled in Amathus in the late 7th century. Communities of the Greek-speaking Romaniote Jews from the Byzantine period have been documented.

== Latin Era (1191–1571) ==
In 1110 CE, Jews were engaged in tax collecting on the island. Benjamin of Tudela reported that there were three distinct Jewish communities in Cyprus in 1163: Karaites, Rabbanites, and the heretical Epikursin, who observed Shabbat on Saturday evenings. King Peter I enticed Egyptian Jewish traders to come to Cyprus by promising equal treatment for Jews. The Genoese (1373–1463) stole Jewish property in both Famagusta and Nicosia. In the 16th century, about 2,000 Jews were reported to have been living in Famagusta. When a rumour reached Venice that Joseph Nassi was plotting to betray the Famagusta fortress to the Ottomans, investigations failed to ascertain the veracity of the report; however, as a counter-measure, the Venetian authorities decided to expel all non-native Jews from the island while leaving the Famagusta community intact.

== Ottoman Era (1571–1878) ==
Cyprus was conquered by the Ottoman Empire after their war with Venice. During Ottoman rule, the Jewish community of Cyprus thrived due to the influx of Sephardi Jews from Ottoman lands, who had emigrated to the Ottoman territories after their expulsion from Spain in 1492. Famagusta became the main centre of the Ottoman Jewish community in Cyprus. Ottoman rule lasted until 1878, when Cyprus came under British rule.

== Modern history ==
During the last 20 years of the 19th century, several attempts were made to settle Russian and Romanian Jewish refugees in Cyprus. The first attempt in 1883 was a settlement of several hundred Russians established in Orides, near Paphos. This attempt failed with the settlers moving elsewhere. Some of these settlers had earlier (in 1882) tried to settle at Latakia in Syria. In 1885, 27 Romanian families from Neamt County settled on the island, also near Paphos, as colonists and were also not successful in forming communities. Both these early settlements were led by Michael Friedland, the son of Rabbi Natan Friedland. Romanian Jews in 1891 again bought land in Cyprus, though they did not move to the country.

Under the leadership of Walter Cohen, 15 Russian families founded a colony in Margo in 1897, with the help of the Ahawat Zion of London and the Jewish Colonisation Association. Davis Trietsch, a delegate to the Third Zionist Congress at Basel, attempted to get an endorsement in 1899 for Jewish immigration to Cyprus, especially for Romanian Jews. Although his proposal was refused by the council, Trietsch persisted, convincing two dozen Romanian Jews to immigrate to the land. 28 Romanian families followed these and received assistance from the Jewish Colonization Association. These settlers established farms in Margo and Asheriton. The Jewish Colonisation Association bought arable land that hadn’t been cultivated for many years because it was infested with malaria. The JCA settled 15 families in the land and mandated Jules Rosenheck, an Alsatian Jew who had previously been the JCA administrator in Galilee, to run this colony. The Jews who moved there weren’t farmers, but they received help from local Cypriots. These Jews didn’t know Greek when they first arrived but they were however in contact with locals: they went to the doctor in Nicosia, and shopped there. Tensions arrose between Sephardim and Ashkenazim settlers, and had to be attenuated by Jules Rosenheck, being himself married to a Greek Sephardic woman. He wrote a 138 page-long document on this attempt to settle Jews in Cyprus, which helps us understand this attempt to populate Cyprus with Jews when there were only 65 Jews on the island in 1881. He decided to focus efforts on the Jewish settlement of Palestine because farmers there usually knew farming, and were more motivated to work the land because of their emotional attachment to Eretz-Israel, unlike the small settlements of Cyprus which had a hard time self-sustaining. They did produce food for themselves, and also cultivated olives, which they couldn't do in their Palestinian zionist settlements because oliviculture was a predominantly Arab sector. Jules Rosenheck motivated the JCA to quit its activity in Cyprus and to redirect those funds on the settlement of Jews in Palestine: «"As early as 1916, Rosenheck urged the JCA to eliminate direct administration in Cyprus as quickly as possible.». The Jewish Colonisation Association continued to give some support to Jewish workers in Cyprus. Most Jewish communities between 1900 and 1910 were located in Nicosia. In 1901, the Jewish population of the island was 63 men and 56 women. In 1902, Theodor Herzl presented in a pamphlet to the Parliamentary committee on alien immigration in London, bearing the title: "The Problem of Jewish Immigration to England and the United States Solved by Furthering the Jewish Colonisation of Cyprus.". This attempt to settle Jews in Cyprus, and the Rosenheck report, provides us insight into the contemporary settlements of the Land of Israel, because its climate is similar to that of Cyprus. Hostility from local population doesn't seem to have been as bad in Cyprus as it was in Palestine.

During World War II and the Holocaust, Cyprus played a major role for European Jews. After the rise of Nazi Germany in 1933, hundreds of Jews escaped to the island. Following the liquidation of the concentration camps of Europe, the British set up a detention camp in Cyprus for Holocaust survivors illegally trying to enter Palestine. From 1946 until the establishment of the nearby State of Israel in 1948, the British confined 50,000 Jewish refugees in Cyprus. Once the State of Israel was created, most of the Jewish community moved there. About 2,000 children were born in Cyprus as families waited to enter Israel. In 2014, a "Garden of Peace" was opened in Xylotymbou to commemorate the plight of the thousands of Jewish refugees imprisoned in the British camps.

== Today ==
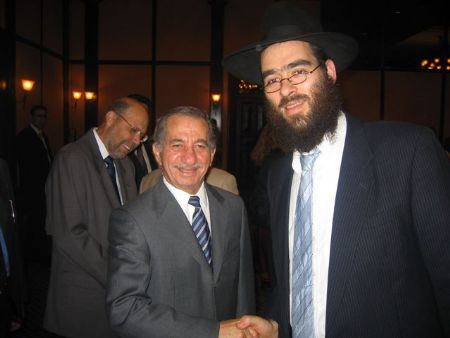
Arie Zeev Raskin, rabbi of Larnaca Synagogue, with then-President of Cyprus Tassos Papadopoulos

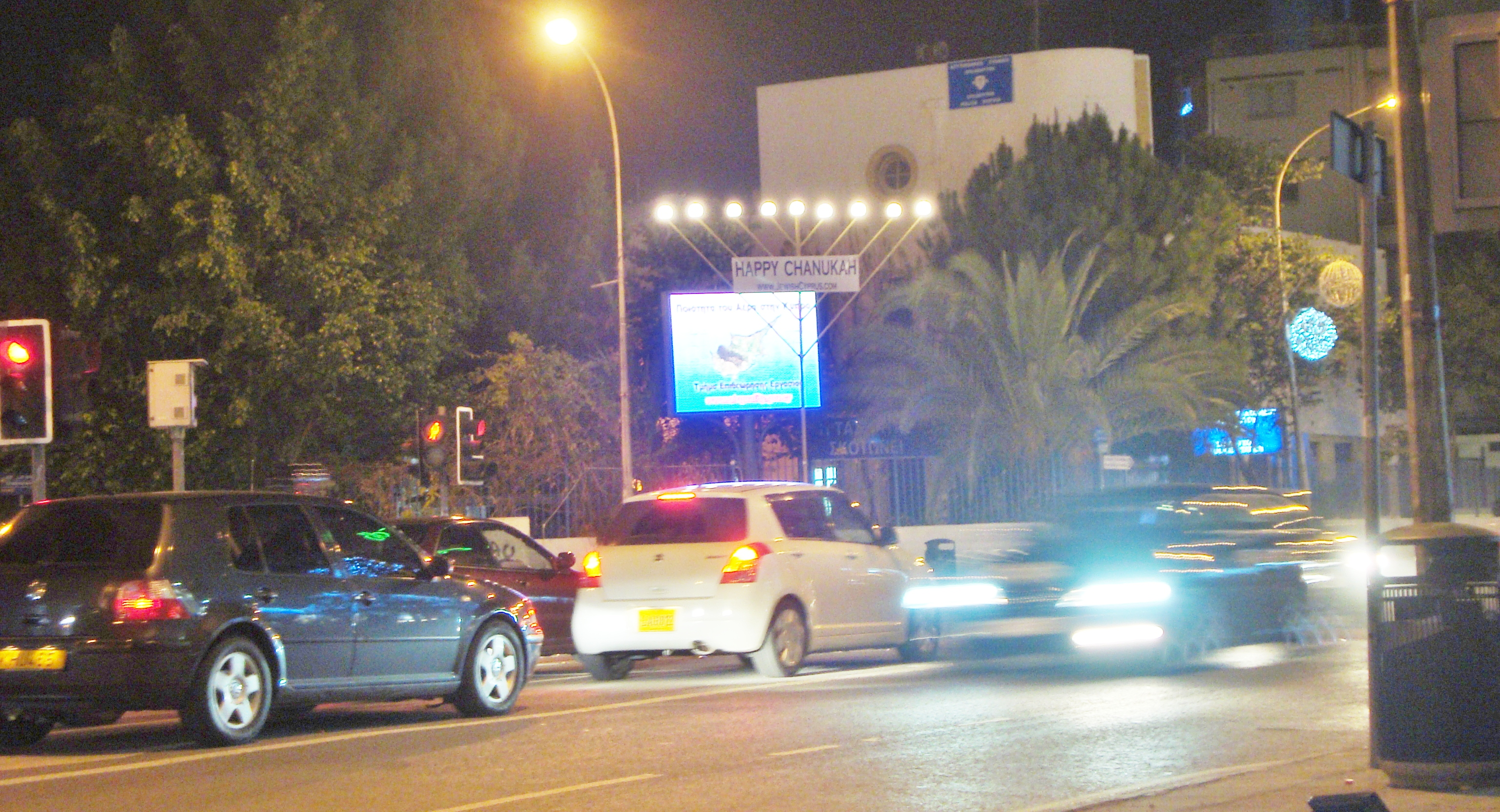
Public Hanukkah menorah in Nicosia

Israel has had diplomatic relations with Cyprus since the State of Israel's founding in 1948, when Cyprus was still a British protectorate. Israel and Cyprus' associations have continued to expand since 1960, the year of Cyprus' independence from Britain. Cyprus has remained a friend of Israel throughout the conflicts of recent decades, despite incidents such as side effects of Turkey and Israel co-operating in military operations, Israeli Air Force members violating Cyprus' airspace, and suspicions that Israel had been passing intelligence to Turkey regarding Cyprus' defense systems. Today, the diplomatic relations between Cyprus and Israel are at an all-time high, reflecting common geopolitical strategies regarding Turkey in particular and economic interests in developing off-shore gas reserves.

Rabbi Arie Zeev Raskin originally arrived in Cyprus from Israel in 2003 as an emissary of Chabad-Lubavitch. He was sent to the island to help stimulate a Jewish revival. On 12 September 2005, he was formally nominated as the official Rabbi of Cyprus in a ceremony attended by guests such as Rabbi Moshe Kotlarsky, the Vice Chairman of the Lubavitch educational division at Lubavitch World Headquarters, the Cypriot Education and Culture minister, and Larnaca's deputy mayor Alexis Michaelides. Other guests included members of the Cypriot government, politicians, diplomats, and other prominent members of the local community.

Also in 2005, the local Jewish community inaugurated the island's first synagogue (Larnaca Synagogue), a mikveh, a Jewish cemetery, and started a Jewish learning program in Larnaca. (The cemetery was established on land that had been used by the late 1800s / early 1900s settlers and although there were earlier graves, only a few were legible or identifiable - these were all post-1900). Since a Cypriot wine is mentioned in the Talmud as a necessary ingredient for the holy incense, the community began overseeing the production of a kosher wine (made of a Cabernet Sauvignon-Grenach Noir blend) at the Lambouri winery in Kato Platres in 2008. As of 2016, the Jewish community of Cyprus has opened Jewish centres in Larnaca, Nicosia, Lemesos, Paphos and Ayia Napa, offering educational programs for adults, a kindergarten, and a day school. The Rabbinate is planning to establish a new larger community centre with a museum about the History of the Jews in Cyprus and a library.

In 2011, Archbishop Chrysostomos II of Cyprus met with the Chief Rabbi of Israel and signed a declaration affirming the illegitimacy of the doctrine of collective Jewish guilt for the killing of Jesus, repudiating the idea as a prejudice that is "incompatible with the teaching of the Holy scriptures".

In 2018, the Jewish population of Cyprus was estimated at around 6,500. By April 2024 the Jewish population in Cyprus has expanded further, with Israelis alone numbering 12,000 according to a report on Israel's KAN public news channel. This report mentions three waves of Israeli migration to the island: the first during the COVID pandemic, the second as a consequence of Israel's political unrest due to the judicial reform attempt in 2023, and the third one in late 2023 - early 2024 following the October 7 attacks and the ensuing Gaza war. Some 800 Israeli families are said to be living in Limassol, and 400 families in Larnaca.

In May 2026, several Israelis were assaulted in Nicosia, one of whom reportedly sustained an ear injury. Police arrested two suspects- men of Syrian origins.

== See also ==
- Cyprus–Israel relations
- History of Cyprus
- Larnaca Synagogue
- History of the Jews in Greece
- Romaniote Jews
- Epiphanius of Salamis
- Hellenistic Judaism
- History of the Jews in the Byzantine Empire
- Greek citron

== Bibliography ==
- Stavros Pantelis, Place of Refuge: A History of the Jews in Cyprus, 2004
- Pieter W. Van der Horst, The Jews of ancient Cyprus in Zutot: Perspectives on Jewish culture Vol. 3, 2004 pp. 110–120
- Gad Freudenthal, Science in medieval Jewish cultures pp. 441-ff. about Cyprus, 2011
- Yitzchak Kerem, "The Jewish and Greek Historical Convivencia in Cyprus; Myth and Reality", Association of European Ideas, Nicosia, Cyprus, 2012
- Benjamin Arbel, "The Jews in Cyprus: New Evidence from the Venetian Period", Jewish Social Studies, 41 (1979), pp. 23–40, reprinted in: Cyprus, the Franks and Venice (Aldershot, 2000).
- Noy, D. et al. Inscriptiones Judaicae Orientis: Vol. III Syria and Cyprus, 2004
- Refenberg, A. A. Das Antike Zyprische Judentum und Seine Beziehungen zu Palästina, Journal of The Palestine Oriental Society, 12 (1932) 209–215
- Nicolaou Konnari, M. and Schabel, C. Cyprus: Society And Culture 1191–1374, pp. 162-ff. 2005
- Falk, A. A Psychoanalytic History of the Jews, p. 315. 1996
- Stillman, N. A. The Jews of Arab Lands, pp. 295-ff. 1979
- Jennings, R. Christians and Muslims in Ottoman Cyprus and the Mediterranean World, 1571–1640, pp. 221-ff. 1993
- Kohen, E. History of the Turkish Jews and Sephardim: Memories of a Past Golden Age, pp. 94–99 on Cyprus. 2007
- Lewis, B. The Jews of Islam, pp. 120-ff. 2014
