= Cyprus–United States relations =

- Cyprus: United States

Diplomatic mission
- Embassy of Cyprus, Washington, D.C.: Embassy of the United States, Nicosia

Relations between Cyprus and the United States can be described as excellent, both sharing membership in the United Nations, International Monetary Fund, the Organization for Security and Co-operation in Europe, the World Bank and the World Trade Organization. Cyprus has been an observer to the Organization of American States. Cypriots view the United States as their second most trusted ally after France with 62% considering the U.S. a desired ally.

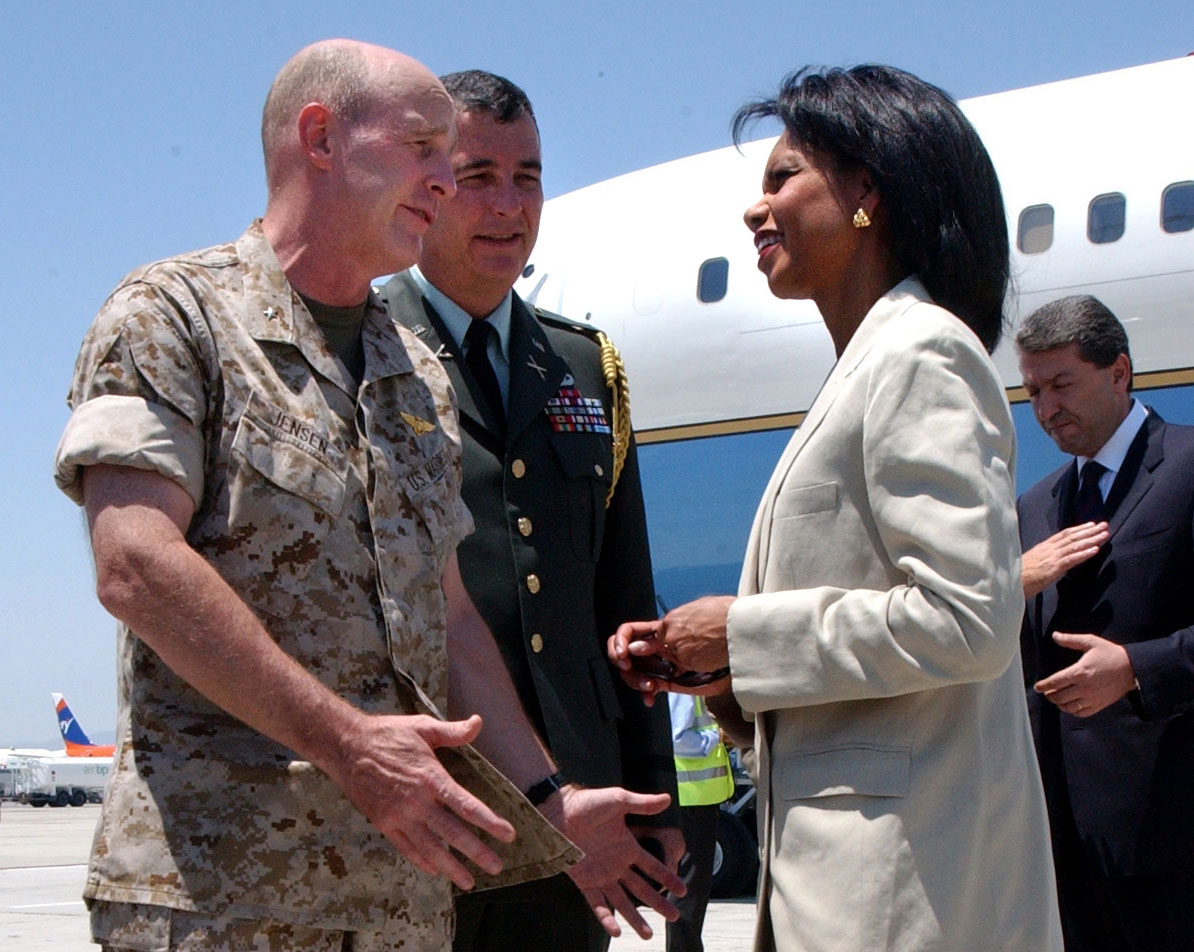
United States Secretary of State Condoleezza Rice speaks with United States Marine Corps Brig. Gen. Carl Jensen in Larnaca, Cyprus

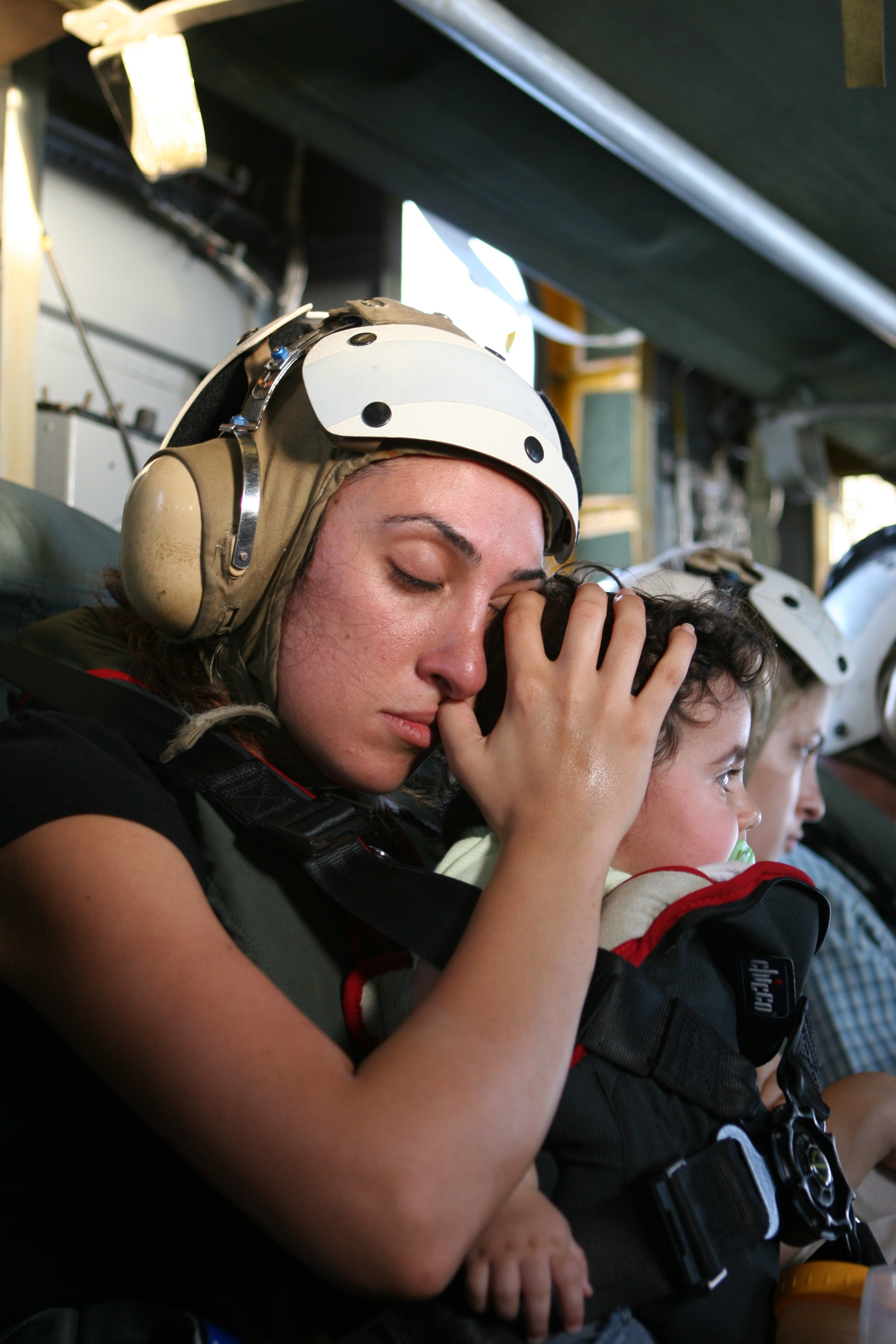
Marines extracting U.S. citizens from Beirut to RAF Akrotiri in Cyprus

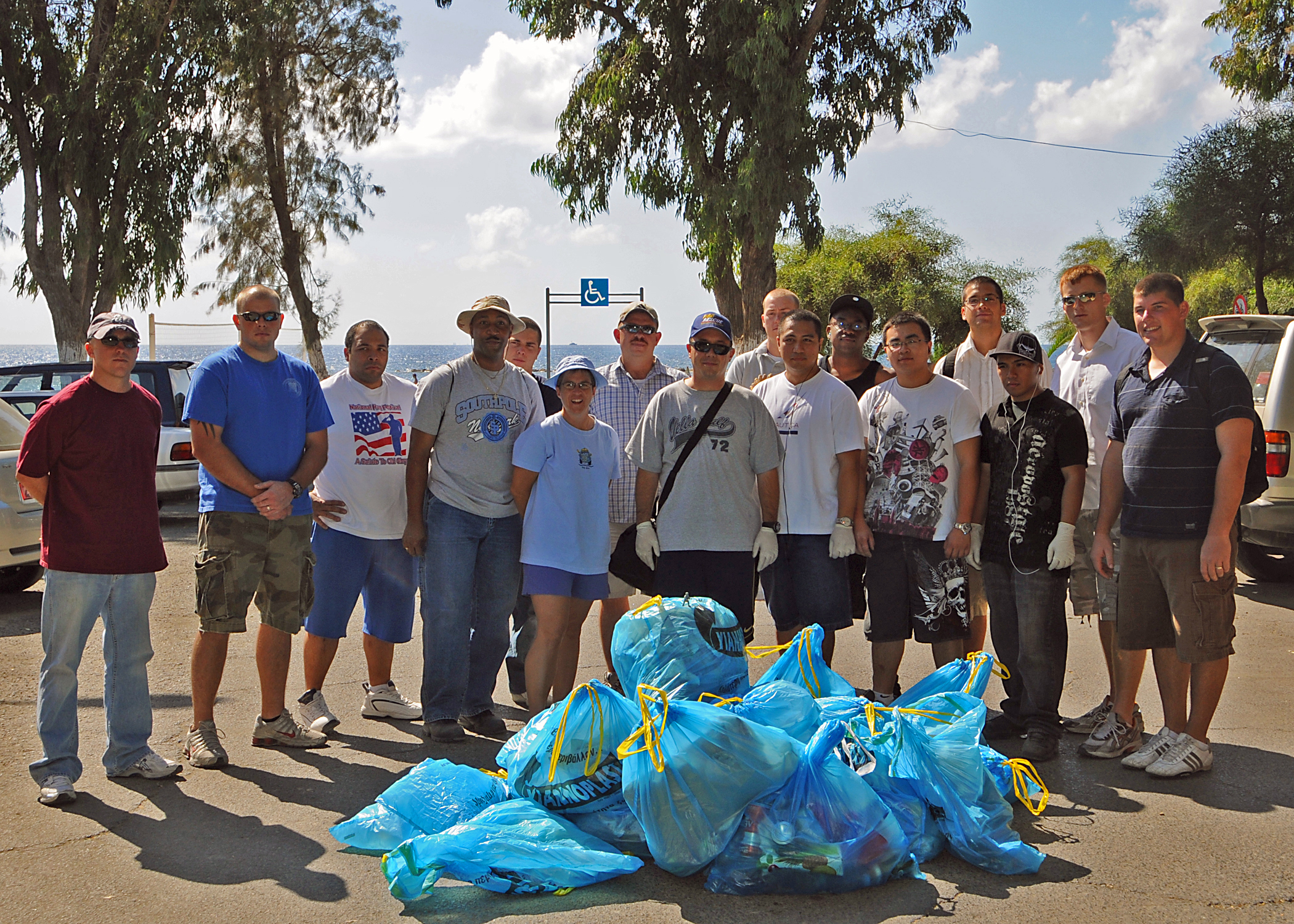
U.S. Sailors assigned to the guided missile cruiser USS Vella Gulf (CG-72) participate in a beach beautification community relations project during a port visit in Limassol

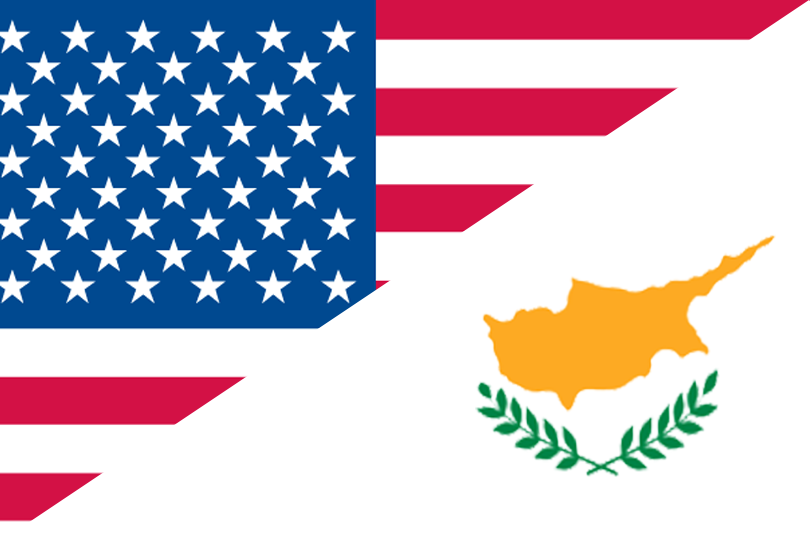
US/CY Flag

== Bilateral & Strategic Relationships ==
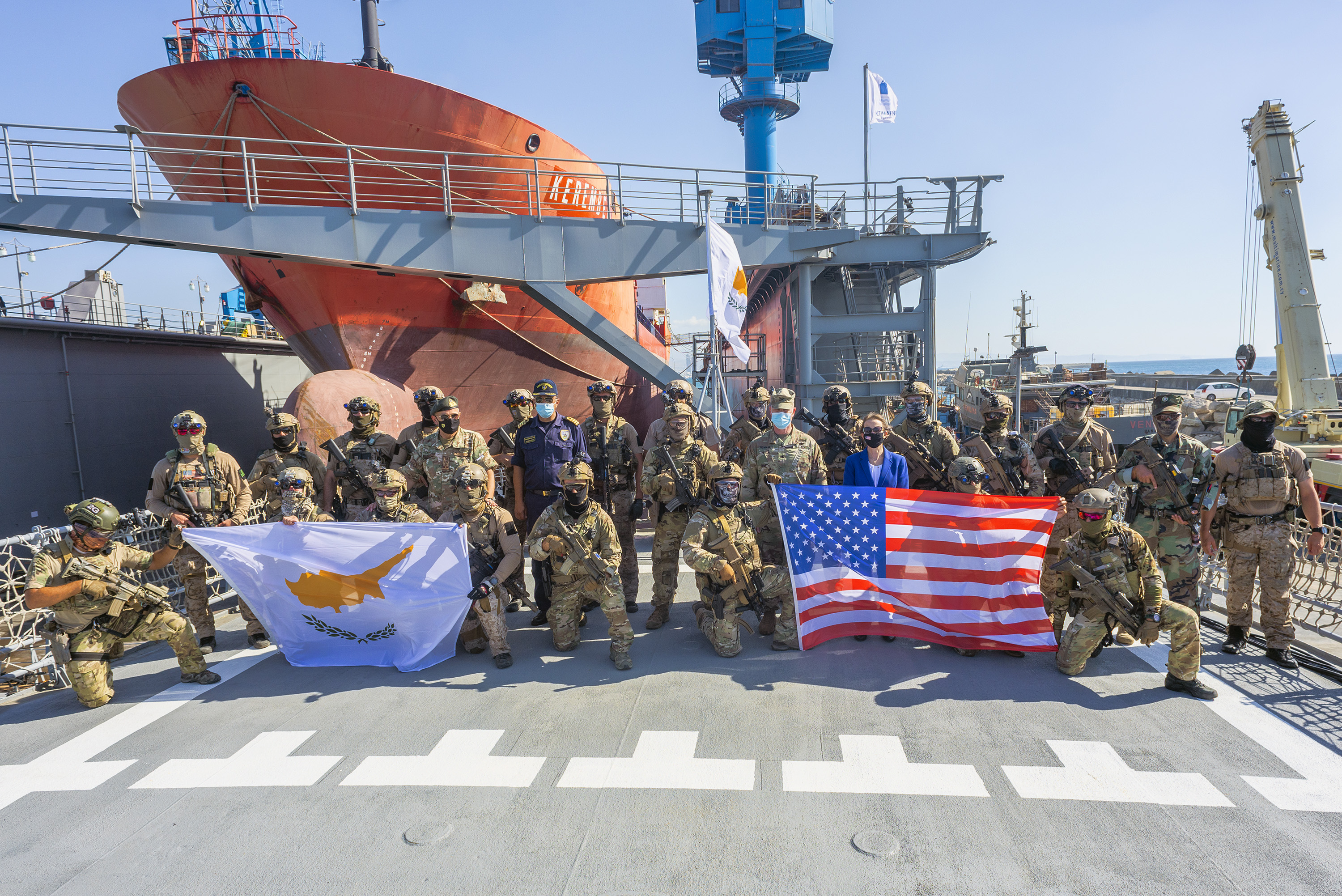
Cypriot (Greek) and US Navy SEALs alongside members from respective government delegations on board a ship take photos after their joint exercises in Cyprus

Relations between the United States and Cyprus can be described as being excellent, yet historically complicated due to many factors. Cyprus is seen as democratic state that can serve as a forward base for the United States. In numerous occasions military bases, ports and airports such as the Port of Limassol and the Larnaca International Airport respectively, have been used for humanitarian and support purposes by the US. Cyprus has also given exclusive rights to a US oil extracting multinationals such as ExxonMobil to extract natural gas from its Exclusive Economic Zone. U.S. imports from Cyprus agricultural products and minerals while business ties encompass several services.

The US also works closely with Cyprus in order to advance shared priorities both bilaterally and in the context of strategic partnership with the European Union, which Cyprus is a member state. The Bilateral partnership focuses in areas of common interest, such as peace, security, trade and investment, diversifying European energy sources, and protecting cultural heritage across the island. The Cabinet of Israel approach of Cyprus over the recent years, and especially after the 2010 Gaza flotilla raid, has boosted Cyprus–Israel relations even further. The United States supports this approach with an Energy Triangle between Cyprus, Israel and Greece.

In 2018, the United States and the Republic of Cyprus signed a Statement of Intent to also strengthen and develop their security relationship. The agreement encompasses efforts to combat terrorism, enhance maritime security and further promote regional stability in the Eastern Mediterranean. The U.S. Embassy in Cyprus is located in Engomi area, within the capital city of Nicosia. The current U.S. Ambassador to Cyprus is Judith G. Garber. Cyprus maintains an embassy at Washington, D.C. and a consulate general in New York City. The United States Department of State retains detail information about Cyprus and US relations and operations.

Wilbur Ross, former United States Secretary of Commerce, was a major shareholder and vice chairman of the board of Bank of Cyprus, after he invested €400 million in the bank in 2014. Prior to his appointment, Ross was a successful banker known for acquiring and restructuring companies and later selling them for a profit once operations have been improved. Ross is a hall of fame member and past director of the Turnaround management Association.

In June 2024, after a meeting between the Secretary of State Antony Blinken and Cypriot Minister of Foreign Affairs Constantinos Kombos, the two sides agreed to open a "Strategic dialogue" with the first meeting to take place in Cyprus in September 2024.

== War on terror ==
The United States is also working closely with Cyprus in the war on terrorism. A mutual legal assistance treaty, which has been in force since September 18, 2002, facilitates bilateral cooperation. Cyprus also signed a Proliferation Security Initiative with the United States on July 25, 2005, which reinforces bilateral counter-terrorism cooperation.

== Joint Energy Projects ==
The US respects the rights of Cyprus to develop its resources in its EEZ and has repeated caution to Turkeys destabilizing Oil & Gas research within Cyprus EEZ. The "US remains deeply concerned by Turkey's repeated attempts to conduct drilling operations in the waters off Cyprus... This provocative step raises tensions in the region. We urge Turkish authorities to halt these operations and encourage all parties to act with restraint and refrain from actions that increase tensions in the region" stated Morgan Ortagus of the United States Department of State in 2019. Cyprus has called on Turkey to delineate the sea boundaries between the two countries.

== US position on Cyprus Dispute ==
The United States and The Republic of Cyprus established official diplomatic relations in 1960, right after the British Cyprus's independence from the United Kingdom. Differences immediately arose between the majority Greek Cypriot (77.1%) and minority Turkish Cypriot (18.2%) communities during the implementation of the Constitution of Cyprus provided at the time. Subsequently, inter-communal violence led to the establishment of the United Nations Peacekeeping Force in Cyprus in 1964. In 1974, a Coup d'état backed by the Greek military junta of 1967–1974 failed to provide Enosis (union) with Greece. Subsequently, a Turkish invasion of Cyprus has followed, that resulted in the capture of approximately 40% of the island and a de facto division of its people and land since 1974. Today, the Republic of Cyprus is the only official government of the island state, however, more than 1/3 of the north is administered by Turkish Cypriots, through the “Turkish Republic of Northern Cyprus” proclaimed in 1983. The United States, does not recognize the “TRNC,” nor does any other country in the world except Turkey. About 30,000 Turkish Troops remain on the island while the "Green line" buffer zone is patrolled by UNFICYP. The United States regards the status quo on the Cyprus dispute as "unacceptable" and fully supports the UN-led inter-communal negotiations as the rightful venue to achieve a fair settlement. In December 2019, the US Congress lifted a decades-old arms embargo on Cyprus. On 2 September 2020, United States decided to lift embargo on selling "non-lethal" military goods to Cyprus for one year starting from 1 October. On October 1, 2022, the United States formally lifted the Defense Trade Restrictions, allowing Cyprus to acquire American weapons.

== US Bi-communal Support ==
Since the 1970s, the US has channeled millions in assistance to both communities and sponsors programs to increase cooperation between the two communities. Following the Annan Plan, the U.S. devoted an additional funding to assist the economic development of the Turkish Cypriots, in order to reduce future settlement costs. In 2000, the US Embassy established a Bicommunal Support Program that is focused on professional development, education and leadership. The UNDP's Action for Cooperation and Trust program is also working with Cypriot organizations to help build relationships island-wide. The focus is on multicultural education and youth empowerment, promoting civil engagement, support to environmental protection and the preservation and promotion of Cyprus's cultural heritage. The Cyprus Partnership for Economic Growth (CyPEG) was also designed to promote business interaction and trade between the communities. Thousands of Cypriots have made friends with members of the “other” community as a result of these programs.

== US scholarships to Cypriots ==
Due to the massive flow of Cypriot under-graduate and post graduate students Cyprus-America Scholarship Program (CASP) offers scholarships for Cypriot students wanting to pursue a bachelor's degree in the United States. The CASP competition is open for bachelor's degrees in all fields except Medicine and Dentistry. A Bachelor's Degree in the United States usually takes four years. The scholarship is for a maximum amount of $25,000 each year, for a maximum total of $100,000.

== Embassies ==
The Embassy of the United States is located in Nicosia, Cyprus. The Embassy of Cyprus is located in Washington, D.C.

In August 2023, during his recent visit to Cyprus, Robert Paschall, Principal Deputy Assistant Secretary for International Affairs at the US Department of Homeland Security, highlighted that Cyprus was on the path to joining the Visa Waiver Program, pending certain requirements. Paschall emphasized the significance of bilateral information exchange and streamlined travel rules. Presently, citizens of Cyprus must meet US visa prerequisites for business and tourism purposes.

== Principal U.S. officials related to Cyprus ==
- Ambassador - John Breslow

== High Level Visits ==
| Guest | Host | Place of visit | Date of visit |
|---|---|---|---|
| (Cyprus) President Makarios III | (United States) President John F. Kennedy | United States | June 5–7, 1962 |
| (Cyprus) President Makarios III | (United States) President Richard Nixon | White House, Washington, D.C., United States | October 24–25, 1970 |
| (Cyprus) President Spyros Kyprianou | (United States) President Jimmy Carter | New York City, United States | October 5, 1977 |
| (Cyprus) President Spyros Kyprianou | (United States) President Ronald Reagan | United States | December 4–9, 1981 |
| (Cyprus) President George Vassiliou | (United States) President George H. W. Bush | United States | October 4, 1989 |
| (Cyprus) President George Vassiliou | (United States) President George H. W. Bush | United States | May 29–30, 1991 |
| (Cyprus) President George Vassiliou | (United States) President George H. W. Bush | United States | March 30, 1992 |
| (Cyprus) President Glafcos Clerides | (United States) President Bill Clinton | United States | May 20–21, 1993 |
| (United States) Vice President Joe Biden | (Cyprus) President Nicos Anastasiades | Cyprus | May 21, 2014 |
| (United States) Secretary of State John Kerry | (Cyprus) President Nicos Anastasiades | Cyprus | December 4, 2015 |
| (Cyprus) Minister of Foreign Affairs Nikos Christodoulides | (United States) Secretary of State Mike Pompeo | United States | November 18, 2019 |
| (United States) Secretary of State Mike Pompeo | (Cyprus) President Nicos Anastasiades | Presidential Palace, Cyprus | September 12, 2020 |
| (United States) Assistant Secretary of State for Political-Military Affairs R. Clarke Cooper | (Cyprus) Minister of Foreign Affairs Nikos Christodoulides | Cyprus | October 20, 2020 |
| (United States) Acting Secretary of Homeland Security Chad Wolf | (Cyprus) Minister of Foreign Affairs Nikos Christodoulides | Larnaca, Cyprus | January 4, 2021 |
| (Cyprus) Minister of Foreign Affairs Ioannis Kasoulidis | (United States) Secretary of State Antony Blinken | Washington D.C., United States | February 1, 2022 |
| (United States) Under Secretary of State for Political Affairs Victoria Nuland | (Cyprus) Minister of Foreign Affairs Ioannis Kasoulidis | Cyprus | April 6, 2022 |
| (United States) Senator Rick Scott | (Cyprus) Minister of Defense Michalis Giorgallas | Limassol, Cyprus | April 6–7, 2023 |
| (United States) Secretary of State Antony Blinken | (Cyprus) President Nikos Christodoulides | Larnaca, Cyprus | November 6, 2023 |
| (Cyprus) Minister of Foreign Affairs Constantinos Kombos | (United States) Secretary of State Antony Blinken | Washington, D.C., United States | June 17, 2024 |
| (Cyprus) President Nikos Christodoulides | (United States) President Joe Biden | Washington D.C., United States | October 30, 2024 |

== See also ==
- Foreign relations of Cyprus
- Foreign relations of the United States
- Cyprus-NATO relations
- United States-EU relations
- NATO-EU relations
