= Michaelides =

Michaelides (Greek: Μιχαηλίδης) is a Greek surname which is a patronym meaning "son of Michael". Notable people with the surname include:

- Alekos Michaelides (1933–2008), Cypriot politician
- Alex Michaelides (born 1977), British Cypriot author and screenwriter
- Alexis Michaelides (born 1950), Cypriot businessman and politician
- Andonis Michaelides, known as Mick Karn (1958–2011), English-Cypriot musician and songwriter
- Andreas Michaelides (born 1952), Cypriot football manager and politician
- Efstathios E. Michaelides (born 1955), Greek-American mechanical engineer
- Konstantinos Michaelides (born 2000), Cypriot footballer
- Solon Michaelides (1905–1979), Cypriot composer, teacher and musicologist
- Stavros Michaelides (born 1970), Cypriot swimmer
- Tony Michaelides (born 1953), British music industry executive
- Vasilis Michaelides (c. 1849–1917), Cypriot poet
