= Kindness in Cyprus =

Organization

Kindness in Cyprus is a Cypriot–Israeli non-profit organization. Founded in 2007 by Rabbi Arie Zeev Raskin, the organization's objectives are to provide medical information and assistance for individuals in Cyprus and Israel. Services include assistance in finding practitioners, language interpretation, emergency transportation, counseling and financial assistance.

The organization's head office is located in Larnaca, Cyprus and there is a branch office in Kfar Saba, Israel. Kindness in Cyprus works in partnership with several hospital and clinics located in Jerusalem, Tel Aviv, Netanya, Nicosia and Limassol, most notably the Meir Hospital in Kfar Saba.
