= Leonidas Pantelides =

Greek diplomat (born 1953)

Leonidas Pantelides (Greek: Λεωνίδας Παντελίδης) (born 11 January 1953, in Nicosia) is the former Ambassador Extraordinary and Plenipotentiary of the Republic of Cyprus to Sweden, Greece and Russia.

- Since June 27, 2016 he is Cypriot Ambassador to the United States of America.

In 2004 Pantelides published a philosophical book in Greek titled Eudemos (About Time).
