= Arie Zeev Raskin =

Chief Rabbi of Cyprus (born 1976)

Rabbi Arie Zeev Raskin
- אריה זאב רסקין
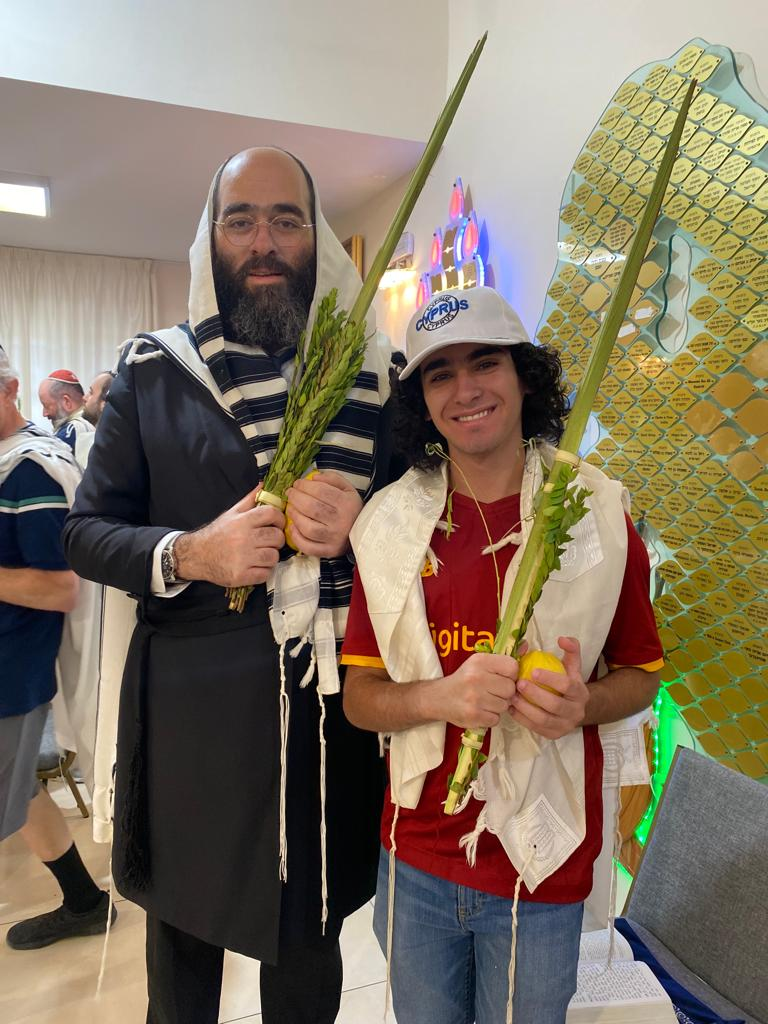
- Rabbi Raskin (left) with a tourist during the Festival of Sukkot in 2022

Personal life
- Born: 1976 (age 49–50) Jerusalem

Religious life
- Religion: Judaism
- Denomination: Orthodox
- Profession: Rabbi
- Synagogue: Larnaca Synagogue
- Position: Chief Rabbi of Cyprus
- Residence: Larnaca, Cyprus

Rabbi Arie Zeev Raskin (Hebrew: אריה זאב רסקין; born 1976) is the Chief Rabbi of Cyprus and the first rabbi on the island in many years.

== Career ==
Rabbi Arie Zeev Raskin's brothers are also serving as rabbis in Jewish communities, with Rabbi Shlomo Raskin in Frankfurt and Rabbi Shmuel Raskin in Budapest. He moved to Cyprus in 2003 with his wife, Shaindel, and their children in an effort to reintroduce Jewish life onto the island. He had previously lived in Kiryat Malachi. He is a follower of the Chabad-Lubavitch branch of Hasidic Judaism. In Cyprus, he set up the Cyprus Jewish Community Centre in Larnaca, close to Larnaca Airport, to serve around 630 Jewish families on the island as well as Jewish travellers and tourists.

Besides the Larnaca Synagogue, the Jewish community of Cyprus also built a dining room, English and Hebrew library, a mikveh, and a kindergarten. Other activities at the Centre include a wide variety of classes and programmes designed to reach all ages and levels of Jewish learning. Activities include discussion groups on Jewish issues, weekly Talmud and Torah study groups, special Jewish holiday programmes, Jewish email services and a website, Shabbat meals, and tourist assistance.

Rabbi Raskin was nominated as the official Jewish leader and the Chief Rabbi of Cyprus on 12 September 2005, at the dedication ceremony of the centre, which was performed by Chief Rabbi of Israel Yona Metzger and Reverend Weisman, a representative for Chief Rabbi of the United Kingdom Jonathan Sacks. In the synagogue, Rabbi Raskin was draped with a tallit and officially took on the leadership of the Cypriot Jewish community. Other guests at the ceremony included then-Israeli ambassador Zvi Cohen-Litant, rabbis from the Rabbinical Center of Europe, the Vice Chairman of the Lubavitch educational division at Lubavitch World Headquarters, Rabbi Moshe Kotlarsky, Rabbi Yekutiel Farkash from Jerusalem, the Cypriot Education and Culture minister Pefkios Georgiades, and Larnaca's deputy mayor Alexis Michaelides, as well as members of the government, politicians, diplomats, rabbis from all over Europe, and other local leaders. By 2006, the building of a mikveh called Mei Menachem was completed, and a summer centre in Ayia Napa and the Cyprus International Jewish School were opened. Raskin said, "Our primary goal is to improve the quality of Jewish life for every Jew in Cyprus: the moral values and rich traditions that Judaism has to offer are things that no Jew should be deprived of".

In 2018, Rabbi Raskin proposed the idea of the Jewish Museum of Cyprus. The Museum, set to be built in Larnaca, Cyprus. The purpose of the Museum is to educate people on the history of Jewish presence in Cyprus. The museum will also focus on Cypriots who helped Holocaust refugees while in the WW2 British internment camps in Cyprus. The Museum will promote awareness, tolerance and show how the Jewish people and Israel are important contributors to culture, education, science and the arts and will promote a better understanding of cultures so that in this environment there can be peace in the Middle East".

== Gallery ==
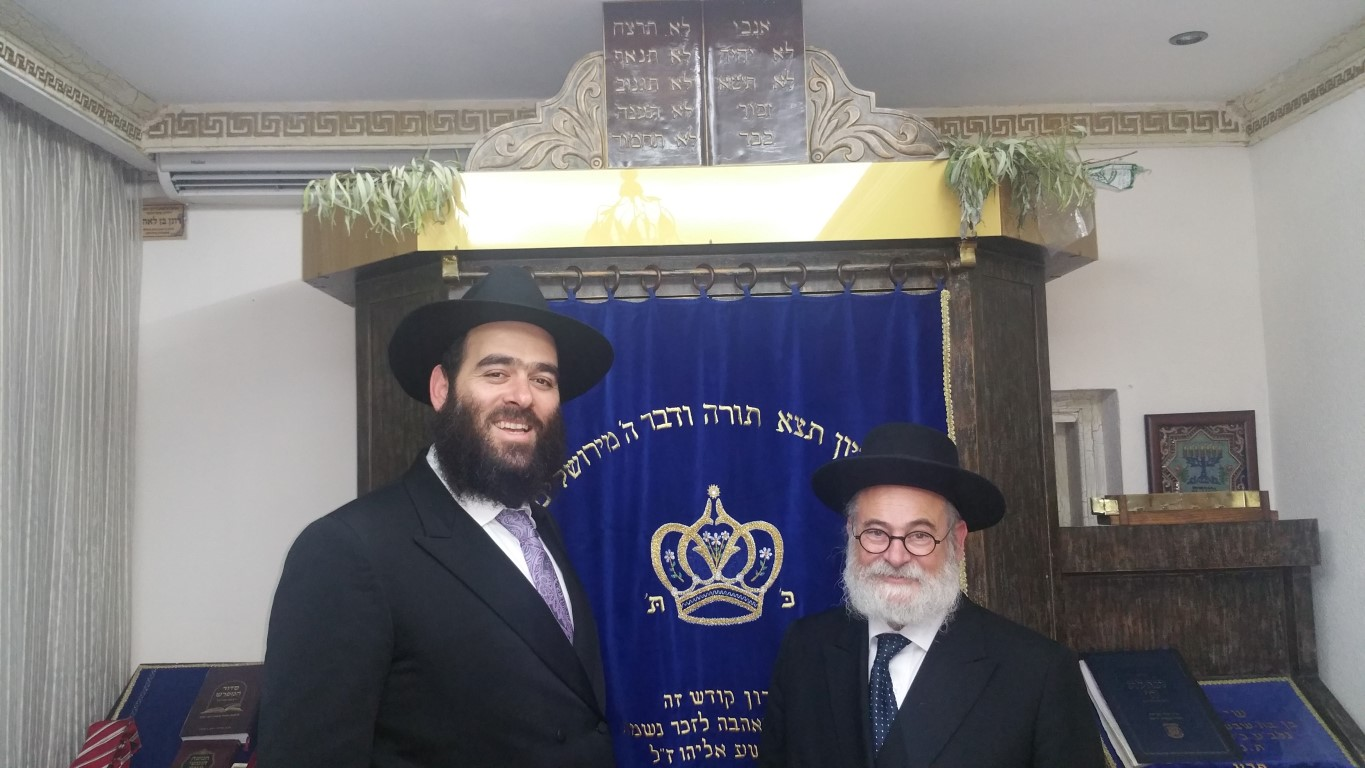
Rabbi Raskin with the Chief Rabbi of Netherlands

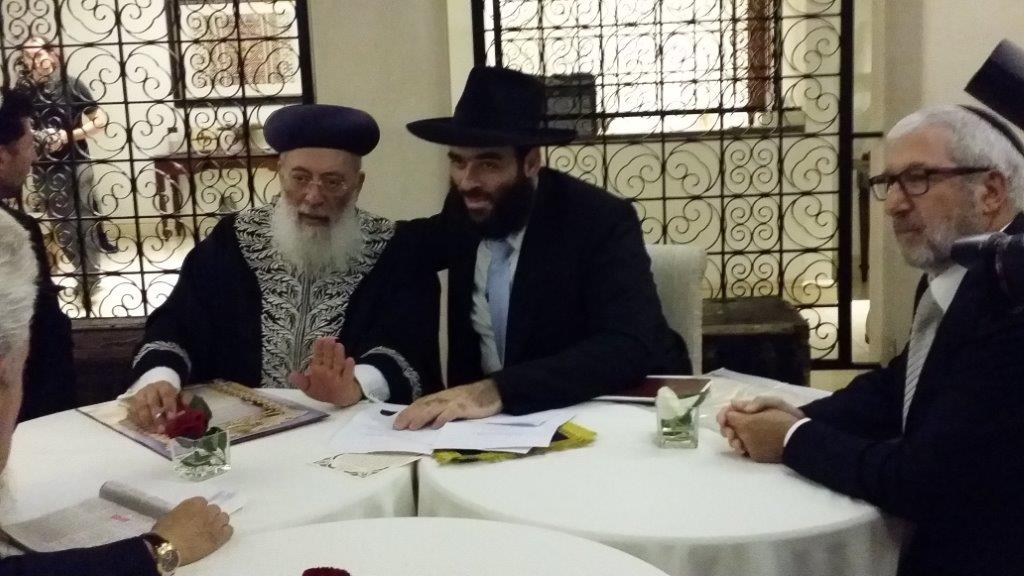
Rabbi Raskin with the Chief Rabbi of Jerusalem, Rabbi Shlomo Amar

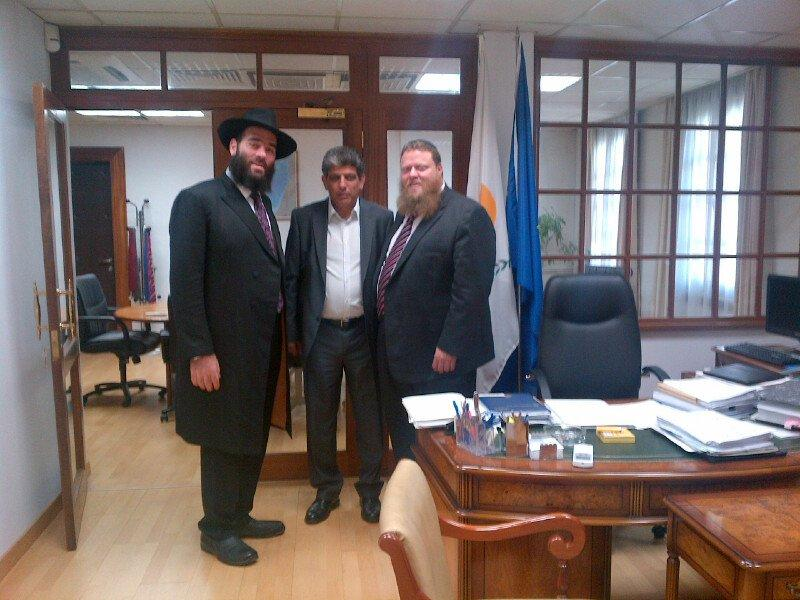
Rabbi Raskin meeting with Mr. Neoklis Sylikiotis, Minister of Commerce, Industry and Tourism 2012

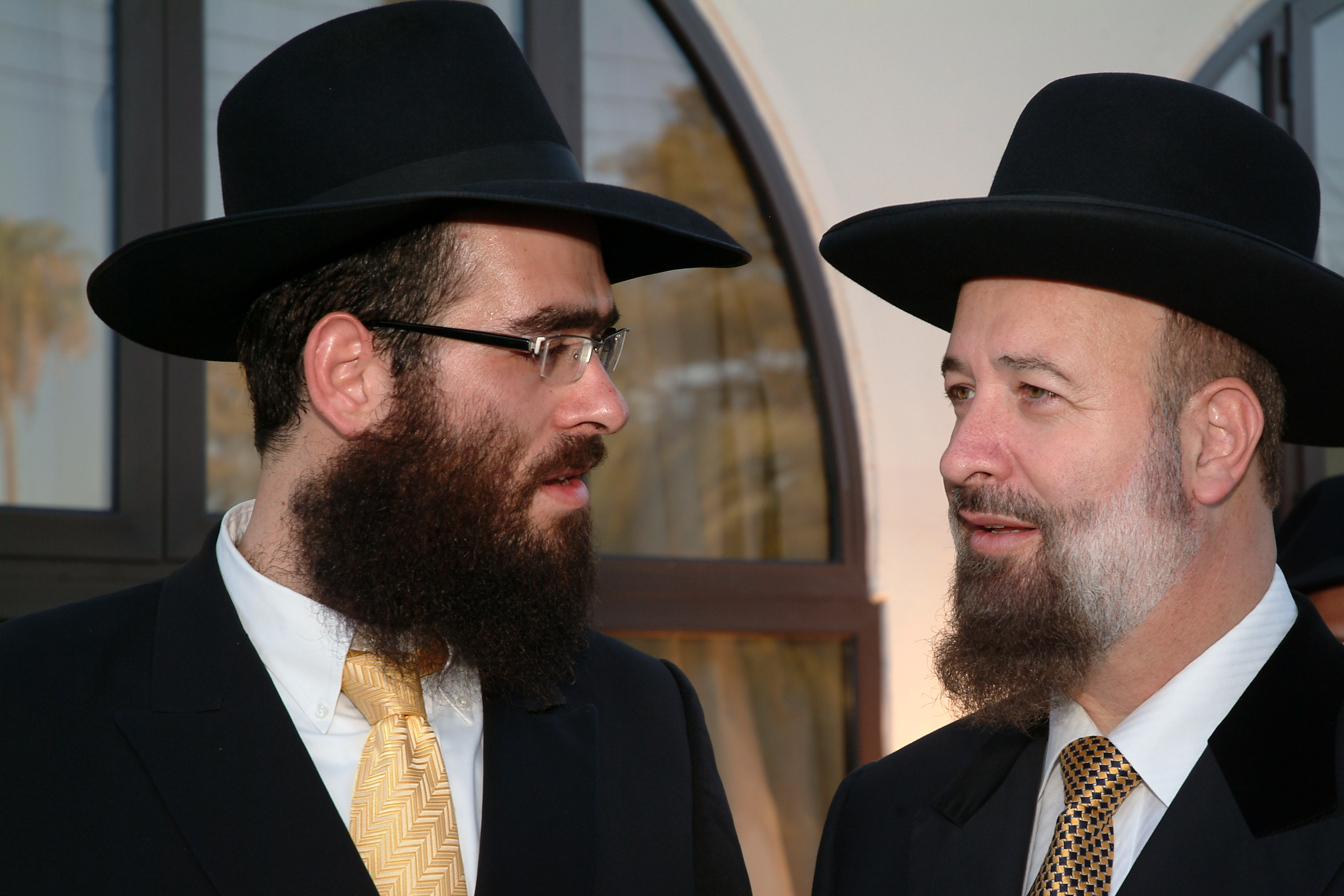
Rabbi Raskin with the Chief Rabbi of Israel, Rabbi Yona Metzger

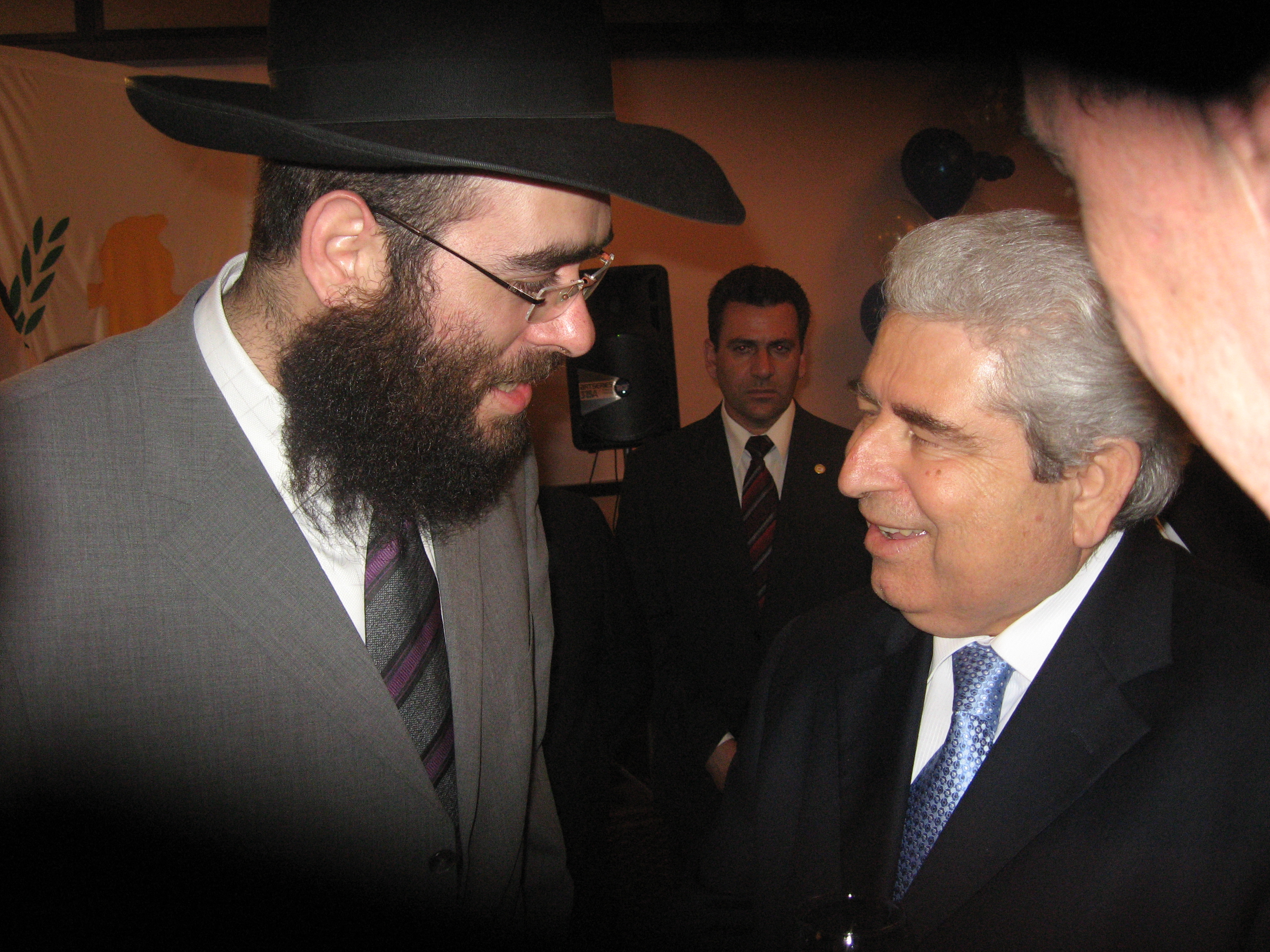
Rabbi Raskin meets then-President of Cyprus, Dimitris Christofias

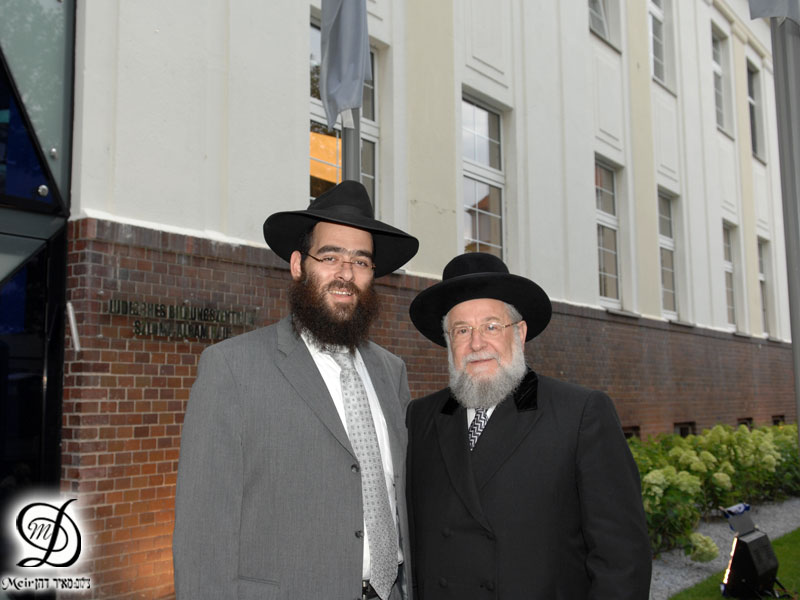
Rabbi Raskin meets Rabbi Yisrael Meir Lau, Chairman of Yad Vashem and Chief Rabbi of Tel Aviv, in Berlin

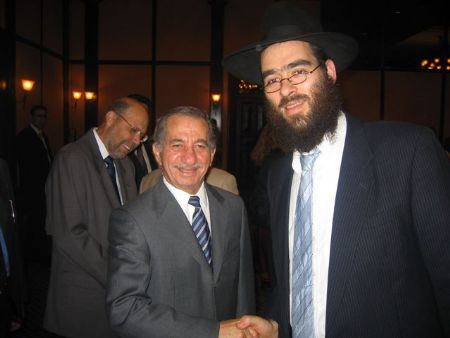
Rabbi Raskin meets then-President of Cyprus, Tassos Papadopoulos

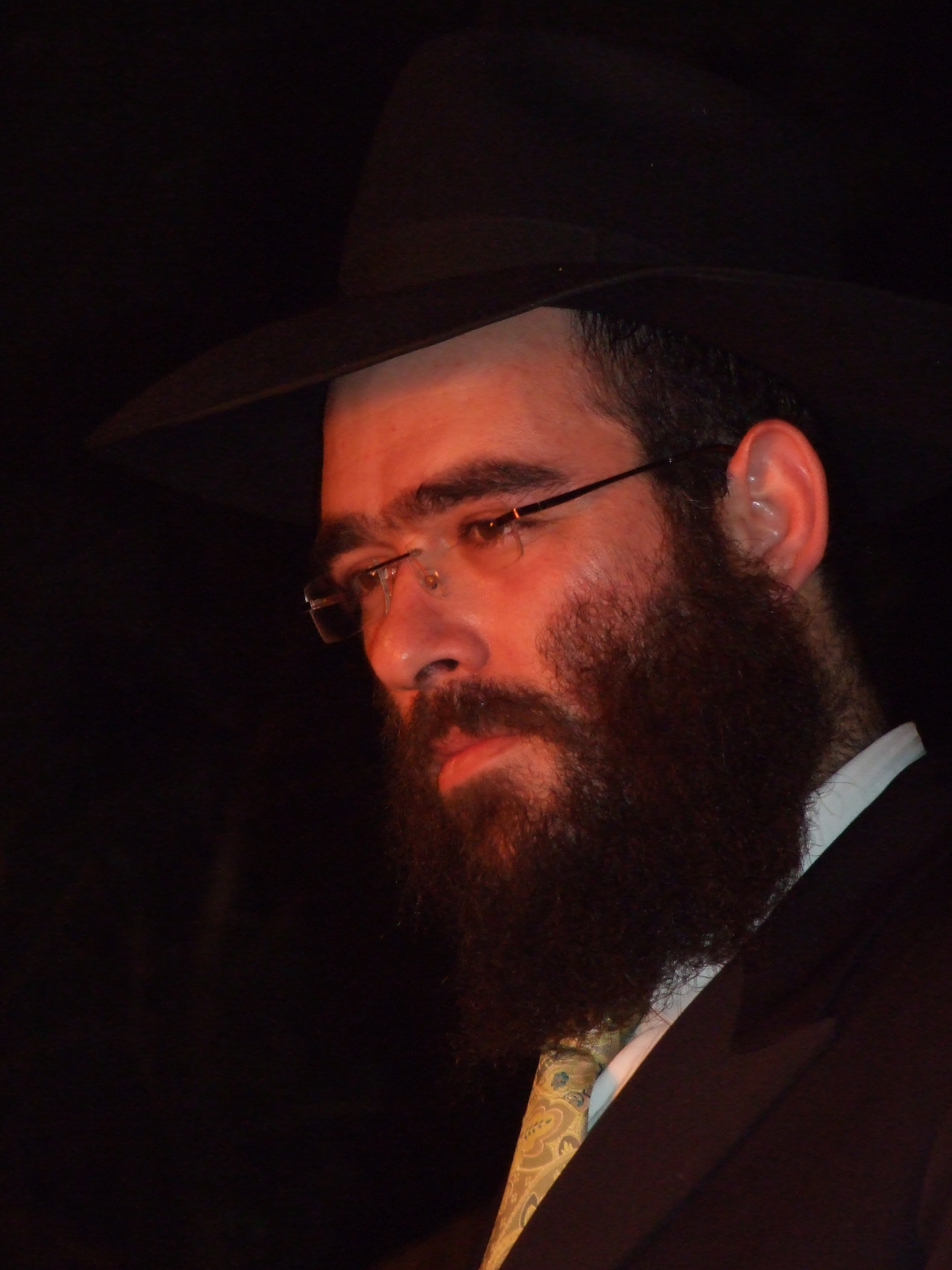
Rabbi Raskin in Lag Baomer, 2008

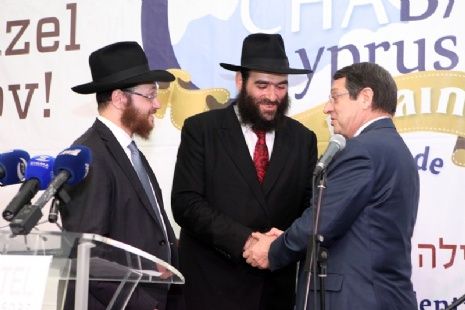
Rabbi Raskin meeting current President of Cyprus, Nicos Anastasiades
