= Larnaca Synagogue =

Hasidic synagogue in Larnaca, Cyprus

Larnaca Synagogue (Great Synagogue of Cyprus)
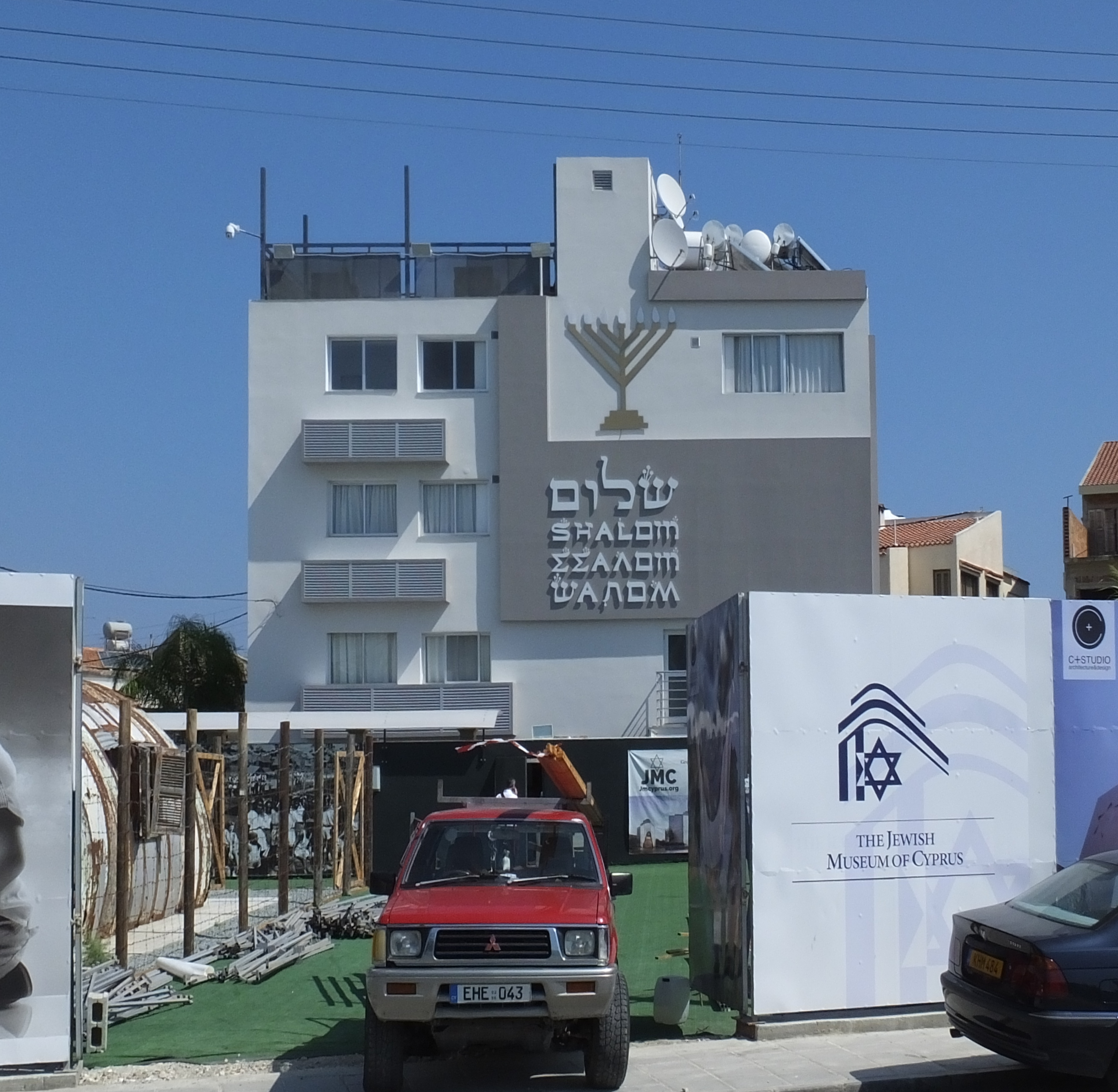
- The synagogue in 2019

- Location of the synagogue in Cyprus

Religion
- Affiliation: Hasidic Judaism
- Rite: Nusach Ashkenaz
- Ecclesiastical or organizational status: Synagogue
- Leadership: Rabbi Arie Zeev Raskin
- Status: Active

Location
- Location: Apollodorou 4, Larnaca
- Country: Cyprus
- Interactive map of Larnaca Synagogue (Great Synagogue of Cyprus)
- Coordinates: 34°54′46″N 33°37′47″E

Architecture
- Type: Synagogue architecture
- Style: Modernist
- Completed: 2005
- Materials: Stone

The Larnaca Synagogue or Great Synagogue of Cyprus, also known as the Cyprus Central Synagogue, is a Hasidic Jewish congregation and synagogue, that is located at Apollodorou 4, in Larnaca, Cyprus. Designed in the Modernist style, the synagogue was completed in 2005. It is the largest and oldest of the five synagogues in Cyprus. The synagogue was inaugurated on 12 September 2003.

== Overview ==
The synagogue is affiliated with the Orthodox denomination, but welcomes Jews from other denominations and visitors of all backgrounds.

Until its opening, Cyprus was the only EU nation without an active synagogue. Chief Rabbi of Israel Yona Metzger told a crowd at the inauguration ceremony, "This is a historic event for Cyprus. We are very happy Cyprus is open to all religions." Cypriot Education Minister Pefkios Georgiades said, "Cyprus is a state where all religions are tolerated and we welcome the Jewish synagogue." The ceremony included the inauguration of a Torah scroll and the laying of the cornerstone for a mikveh.

== See also ==
- History of the Jews in Cyprus
- Arie Zeev Raskin
