= Cyprus–Israel relations =

- Cyprus: Israel

Diplomatic mission
- Embassy of Cyprus, Tel Aviv: Embassy of Israel, Nicosia

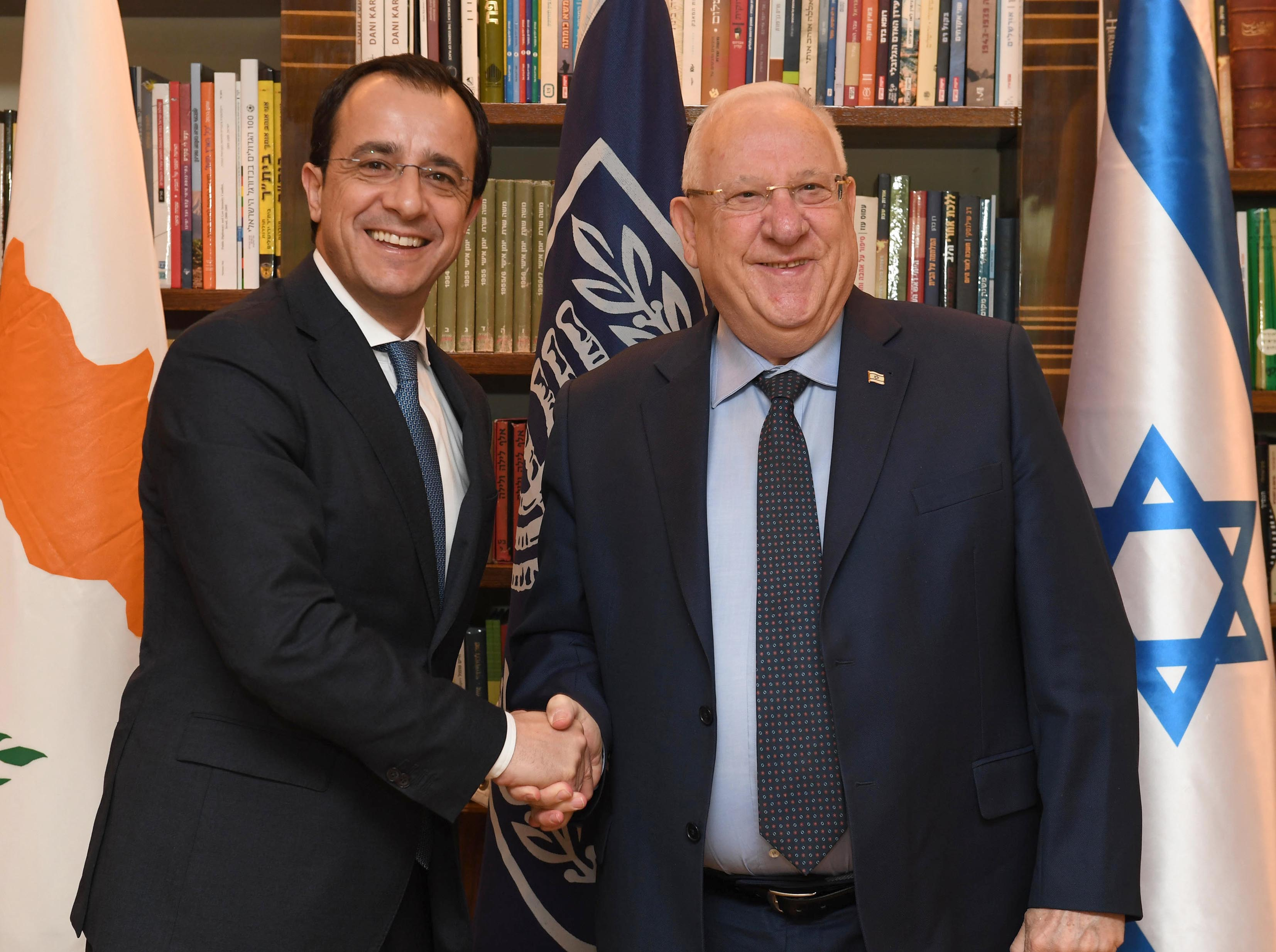
Israeli president Reuven Rivlin with Cypriot foreign minister Nikos Christodoulides, 2018

Cyprus–Israel relations refer to the bilateral relations between the Republic of Cyprus and the State of Israel. Israel has an embassy in Nicosia, while Cyprus has an embassy in Tel Aviv. Both countries are members of the Union for the Mediterranean, United Nations, Euro-Atlantic Partnership Council, Organisation for Economic Co-operation and Development, International Monetary Fund, World Bank, and World Trade Organization.

Cyprus and Israel have extensive collaboration on military, cultural, and political matters. The prospect of a joint use of oil and gas fields off Cyprus, as well as EuroAsia Interconnector, now the world's longest subsea electric power cable have also brought the two countries closer together.

== History ==
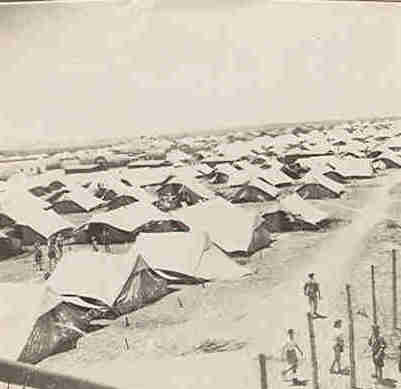
Deportation camps at Cyprus for Jews of Europe

During and immediately after World War II, Cyprus became a transit point for Jewish Holocaust survivors trying to reach Mandate Palestine. Cyprus was then a British Crown Colony. From 1946 to 1949, an estimated 53,000 Jews were detained by the British in camps on Cyprus.

Today, relations between Cyprus and Israel are strong. Many Cypriots and Israelis refer to them as Cypriot-Israeli brotherhood. In September 2013, the leader of Democratic Rally Averof Neofytou called for supporting Israel as Cyprus's most reliable partner. Israeli President Shimon Peres called Cyprus Israel's most predictable neighbour.

== Bilateral relations ==
In the 1980s and 1990s, Cyprus expressed concern over Israel's then close defense relationship with Turkey. Cyprus outwardly backed the Palestinians in the Arab–Israeli conflict and officially recognizes Palestine as a de facto state. Cypriot first lady Androulla Vassiliou, wife of President George Vasiliou, was declared persona non grata in Israel when a delegation she was leading attempted to meet with Yasser Arafat, who was then under house arrest.

Relations began to improve in 1993. A number of bilateral agreements were signed and many official visits have taken place including the official State visit by the President of Israel and a reciprocate visit by the President of Cyprus.

In the early 2000s, members of the Cypriot branch of the Greek Orthodox Church were accused of selling church-owned land in the West Bank to Israeli developers.

In 2010, an exclusive economic zone (EEZ) was set within the territorial waters between Israel and Cyprus at the maritime halfway point, a clarification essential for safeguarding Israel's rights to oil and underwater gas reservoirs. The agreement was signed in Nicosia by Israeli Infrastructure Minister Uzi Landau and the Cypriot Foreign Minister Markos Kyprianou. The two countries agreed to cooperate in the development of any cross border resources discovered, and to negotiate an agreement on dividing joint resources.

In February 2012, Netanyahu visited Cyprus, the first visit of an Israeli Prime Minister in history, and the two countries signed a search and rescue agreement. Israeli foreign minister Avigdor Lieberman visited Cyprus at the invitation of his Cypriot counterpart when Netanyahu was in Washington, and Lieberman has met with Cyprus foreign minister Kyprianou several times.

== Energy and natural gas ==
Exclusive economic zone between Israel and Cyprus as signed in Nicosia

Israeli energy firm Delek Group is seeking to work with Cyprus on natural gas exploration and extraction near the Leviathan gas field off the Israeli coast where Delek is already active. The large oil and gas field, and the opportunities of joint use, have brought the two countries closer together. This however has opened a new source of frictions between both countries and Turkey. Noble Energy, a US company, is also involved in the Leviathan field and this may lead to US government involvement in the gas fields dispute.

Turkey claimed that the Greek-Cypriot government in the southern part of the island did not have the authority to sign deals with Israel which could be detrimental to the Turkish-Cypriot population in Northern Cyprus. The discovery of oil fields in the Mediterranean allowed Turkey Prime Minister Recep Tayyip Erdoğan to continue his diplomatic confrontation on two fronts: one with Israel, and one with Cyprus.

Cyprus President Dimitris Christofias visited Israel in March 2011 for the first-ever official visit by a Cypriot head of state. Minister of Commerce, Industry and Tourism Antonis Paschalides noted however that, despite all the enthusiasm, Cyprus could not ignore Israeli tourism and real estate projects in the island's north, which was under disputed Turkish control.

According to Turkish media reports in September 2011, Israel Air Force fighter planes flew through the airspace of both Cyprus and Northern Cyprus after taking off to face a Turkish seismic research ship in the Eastern Mediterranean. The reports added that Turkey responded by launching two fighters to track the Israeli planes, at which point the Israeli fighter jets returned to Israeli airspace. The Turkish research vessel was seen as a Turkish provocation in the dispute over gas fields. The operation of Israeli planes in Cyprus airspace was interpreted as a further sign of close Israel-Cyprus ties.

ΔΕΗ-Quantum Energy, a Cyprus-based group including Greece's state-controlled power utility Public Power Corporation of Greece (PPC, also known as DEH) is planning to lay the world's longest submarine power cable, linking Israel, Cyprus and Greece. The link, called the EuroAsia Interconnector project, would be the longest in the world. The cable is supposed to pass from Israel via Cyprus and Crete, and from there to mainland Europe notably Italy and Switzerland and from Bulgaria to Serbia.

During his visit in Israel in April 2013 Foreign Minister of Cyprus has expressed his enthusiasm that as Cyprus has financial and economic problems, the energy cooperation agreement between Cyprus and Israel is a bright spot in that will boost hopes for a quick recovery by 2014.

In March 2021, Cyprus said that it had reached an agreement with Israel concerning the gas reserves in their maritime border. The Israeli side said that the two countries have set a framework that might solve the issue.

In May 2023, Cyprus and Israel were working on a deal to create a natural gas pipeline between the two countries, whereas Israeli natural gas would be liquified and exported to Europe. The American energy company Chevron is reportedly interested in the potential pipeline, which would be 320-kilometer (200-mile) in length and estimated to cost 450 million euros ($489 million), while the liquefaction plant would cost 1 billion euros ($1.1 billion). The pipeline would take about two and a half years to build.

== Cypriot mediation between Israel and Lebanon ==
Since the establishment of the exclusive economic zone (EEZ) of Cyprus, Israel and Lebanon, Cyprus has been offering mediation between Lebanon and Israel over their maritime border dispute which was delaying gas and oil exploration of the two countries. General Director of the Department of Energy in Cyprus Solonas Kasinis announced in 2010 from Limassol that Cyprus does anything possible to strengthen cooperation between the three countries not only on the issue of the division of gas and oil reserves but also on military and strategic matters. In an effort to further settle the unstable situation between Israel and Lebanon, Chair President of Cypriot Parliament Yiannakis Omirou visited Lebanese President Michel Suleiman in Beirut to find solution to the disputes.

== Tripartite energy memorandum ==
On August 8, 2013, Greece, Israel and Cyprus signed the tripartite energy memorandum of understanding after the completion of one year negotiation in Nicosia. Negotiations were held between the Energy and Water Resources Minister of Israel Silvan Shalom, the Cypriot minister of agriculture, natural resources and environment Nicos Kouyialis and the Cypriot minister of environment, energy and climate change George Lakkotrypis. The 2,000-mega-watt EuroAsia Interconnector is planned to lift Cyprus and Israel out of energy isolation through cheaper electricity as supported by George Lakkotrypis. Silvan Shalom announced that the agreement is "historic" and that it demonstrated the powerful relations between the three countries adding that electricity will be exported to the European energy market via cable. The Greek Prime Minister at the time Antonis Samaras proclaimed on 8 August that Israel has a special role to play in supplying Europe with energy resources and supported that it can become a key energy hub.

== Civil marriage ==
Israeli matrimonial law is still based on the Millet system employed in the Ottoman Empire, which was not modified during the British Mandate and remains in force. Marriages in each religious community are under the jurisdiction of its own religious authority. Israeli couples who for any reason are unable or unwilling to contract a religious marriage often opt to get married in neighboring Cyprus, given that civil, interfaith and same-sex marriages entered into abroad are recognised by the Israeli state. Republic of Cyprus is ranked as the first or second destination for Israeli civil wedding, alongside Prague.

== State visits to Cyprus ==
Israel and Cyprus agreed on the middle of February 2011 to launch a joint natural gas and oil exploration venture in their adjoining territorial waters. Prime Minister Benjamin Netanyahu and Cypriot President Demetris Christofias inked the deal during Netanyahu's visit to Nicosia, which was the first by an Israeli leader ever. The deal will also allow Israel to use Cyprus' air space and territorial waters for aerial and naval search and rescue drills. The Prime Minister's Office said that the deal was part of the two nations' efforts to "strengthen the improving ties between the two nations, as well as boost energy security in both countries." Netanyahu traveled to Cyprus with a mission of 20 high-level government officials, including Energy and Water Minister Uzi Landau and the directors of Israel's National Security and National Economic councils.

In April 2012 Foreign Minister made a three-day visit to Nicosia to discuss the gas-sharing agreement to exploit reserves that fall on the maritime boundary between the two countries. Lieberman later discussed the prospects of further expansion of cooperation between the two countries in the fields of energy, tourism and investment with Commerce and Industry Minister Neoclis Sylikiotis. Lieberman said relations between the two countries are probably at their best stage since the establishment of Cyprus and Israel.

On 2 September 2013 President of the Cypriot House of Representatives Yiannakis Omirou and the Knesset Speaker Yuli-Yoel Edelstein signed a protocol of cooperation between their countries' Parliaments. After the signing of the protocol Yiannakis Omirou expressed his enthusiasm for the setting up of a Cyprus-Israeli Friendship Group in the respective parliaments. Edelstein announced that the signing of the memorandum is a testament to the joint efforts and close cooperation between the two countries and will increase connection in the years to come. On 2 September 2013 the president of Democratic Rally, Averof Neophytou in a press conference in Nicosia characterised Israel as Cyprus' most reliable ally.

== Economic relations ==
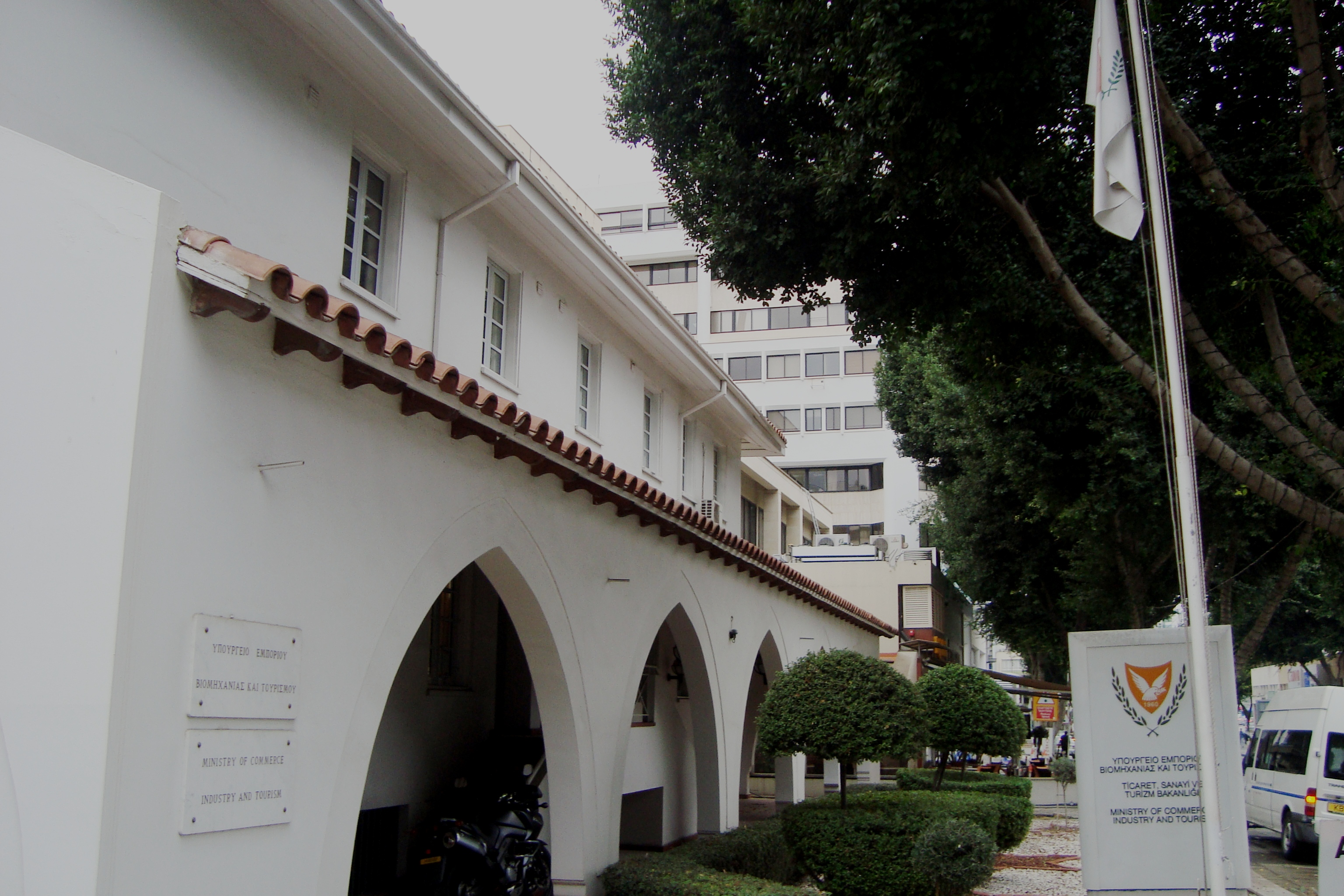
Cyprus-Israel Business Association is hosted in the Ministry of Commerce, Industry and Tourism on Makariou Avenue

The Cypriot media report that the country could receive natural gas from Israel in early 2015, at reduced prices, if discussions on the supply of small quantities are completed by the end of the year, as the Minister of Commerce, Industry and Tourism Neoklis Sylikiotis has announced in a press conference about a visit to Israel by a high-ranking Cypriot delegation. The Cypriot government is seeking an interim energy solution until its own natural gas reserves can be developed. Minister Sylikiotis said that Israel is positive in supplying Cyprus a small quantity of natural gas, 0.5-0.7 billion cubic meters, for electricity production. He added that Cyprus would import Israeli gas in the form of liquefied natural gas (LNG) through contracts between Electricity Authority of Cyprus and Israel Electric Corporation (IEC). Export proposals also include building a pipeline from Israel, Cyprus and finally to Greece or combining the gas from discoveries off Cyprus and Israel at a joint LNG plant as soon as 2018 that will be built in the southern city of Larnaca. Another option suggested by Noble was to build a plant in Jordan to ship the fuel to Asia through the Red Sea.

=== Cyprus-Israel Business Association ===
With the cooperation of both Cypriot and Israeli government in 2008 Cyprus-Israel Business Association was formed and is held annually in Nicosia, Cyprus. It headquarters in Cyprus Chamber of Commerce and Industry building and contacts Ministry of Finance of both Israel and Cyprus to coordinate an increase in financial bonds of the two countries. In the annual forum of Cyprus-Israel Business Association speakers from key positions from both countries take part. In September 2011 Chief Executive Officer of the Tel Aviv Stock Exchange Ester Levanon visited Cyprus to present “The Tel Aviv Stock Exchange as a reflection of the Israeli Economy”. Other prominent speakers include Ex-Ministers of Commerce and Trade Praxoulla Antoniadou Kyriacou and Antonis Paschalides, the President and the Secretary-General of the Cyprus Chamber of Commerce and Industry Manthos Mavrommatis, the President and the General Manager of the Cyprus Stock Exchange George Koufaris, the Ambassador of Israel Michael Harari and the Ambassador of Belgium Christakis Papavassiliou.

In 2013 Cyprus-Israel Business Association conferences took place in Jerusalem and even though the participants of 100 Israeli companies and the 30 Cypriot firms discuss how to increase cooperation in fields ranging “from milk to gas,” the main emphasis was on the Mediterranean natural resource that each of the countries has the potential to export. In May 2013 the President of the Israel-Cyprus Business Association Christakis Papavasilious announced “the new historic era” that Cyprus and Israel are entering together in regards to the economic aspect, and that both countries should rely on each other in order to push forward.

=== Electricity connection ===
Electricity connection between Hadera of Israel and Vasilikos in Cyprus is one of the projects that will be funded by the European Union in the framework of the programme Connecting Europe Facility (CEF). According to a press release issued by the European Commission the amount earmarked for the Hadera Israel-Vasilikos Cyprus connection is approximately €1.325m. The project is based on an undersea cable for the connection of the electricity systems of Israel, Cyprus and Greece. Its capacity will be 2000 MW and its length approximately 1518 km. It will include three connections: 329 km between Israel and Cyprus, 879 km between Cyprus and Crete and 310 km between Crete and mainland Greece and will allow electricity transmission to both directions.

=== Import - Export ===
Cyprus - Israel trade in millions USD-$
	Israel imports Cyprus exports	Cyprus imports Israel exports	Total trade value
2023	291.7	781.7	1073.4
2022	298.7	1054.1	1352.8
2021	270	575	845
2020	224	316.7	540.7
2019	225.2	647.6	872.8
2018	427.8	750.8	1178.6
2017	368.2	404.5	772.7
2016	319.2	311.1	630.3
2015	349.4	418.4	767.8
2014	392.2	950.6	1342.8
2013	463.5	1126.5	1590
2012	964.7	905	1869.7
2011	318.9	937.4	1256.3
2010	152.6	755.6	908.2
2009	43.9	566.8	610.7
2008	68.7	880.5	949.2
2007	65.1	623.1	688.2
2006	32.2	490.8	523
2005	25.2	540.9	566.1
2004	122	343.1	465.1
2003	111.2	215.6	326.8
2002	22.5	191.4	213.9

== Military collaboration ==
In October 2011 Phileleftheros newspaper published a document detailing a military exercise between Israel and Cyprus, which included mid-air refuelling of fighter jets and quick touchdown landings by Israel Air Force combat helicopters in Cyprus. In 2013 Israel is expecting to receive approval from the Cypriot government to station military jets at the Andreas Papandreou airbase in the city of Paphos, creating the first Israeli military station outside the Israel. It is unknown if the plans include a permanent military presence on the island, with a full-time deployment of airmen. In April 2013 it was reported that Israel was set to send warships to the eastern Mediterranean for a joint military exercise with the Republic of Cyprus. Cypriot Defense Minister Fotis Fotiou confirmed that the joint exercise, which will include the participation of four or five Israeli warships, would start on 25 April. Fotiou also noted that Cyprus will focus on the security of the eastern Mediterranean region and that of gas companies. On 9 April the Minister of Defence, Fotis Fotiou, met at his office with the Ambassador of Israel Michael Harari. In an official statement after the meeting Michael Harari expressed his view that Israel and Cyprus are determined to strengthen and deepen their relations in all areas in favor of their peoples and the region in general. In early May 2013 Israel Defence Minister Moshe Ya'alon and Cypriot Defence Minister Fotis Fitiou met in Tel Aviv to set the foundations for a coordinated cooperation in energy security issues. On his return to Cyprus, the Cyprus Defense Minister announced that during his meeting in Tel Aviv, they also decided to set up technical committees to promote the issues examined. Moshe Ya'alon referred to the strategic relationship between the two countries and their benefit from the natural-gas field that lies between their shores. He added that Israel intends to improve the preparedness of its navy in the Mediterranean to protect the gas facilities of Israel and Cyprus."

On 11 February 2014 between 11am and 1am Israel and Cyprus held a joint military exercise codenamed ‘Onisilos-Gideon’ in Cypriot FIR and the scheduled drill occurred inside the Nicosia flight information region (FIR). Israeli fighter jets carried out flybys over areas south of Limassol featuring 32 F15 and F16 jets and six more support aircraft of the Israeli Air Force, the exercise included simulated firing at targets on land and sea along the southern coast from Limassol to Paphos.

=== "Onisilos-Gideon" October 2014 ===
On 21 October 2014 Israel and Cyprus held joint military exercise that included aerial maneuvers by Israeli Air Force fighter jets in Cypriot airspace in collaboration with the Cypriot National Guard. Another part of the military drill took place in Cypriot territorial waters off the island of Crete.

== Memorandum of Understanding ==
On 21 December 2011 Israeli minister of public security, Avi Dichter, with the Cypriot Minister of Interior Eleni Mavrou, signed a Memorandum of Understanding (MoU) ensuring the mutual protection and assistance between the two countries in the field of disaster management and civil protection. The MoU provides for collaboration and sharing practices on how to prepare the population for disasters and crises.

== Environmental cooperation ==
A new desalination plant operates in Limassol, launched by the National Water Company Mekorot. The desalination plant has the capacity to produce up to 40,000 cubic metres (11,000,000 US gal) of desalinated potable water daily. At the inauguration of the plant in August 2013, there were present both President of Cyprus Nicos Anastasiades and Israeli Minister of Energy and Water Resources Silvan Shalom. Cypriot Minister of Agriculture Nicos Kouyalis and Israel Minister of Energy and Water Resources Silvan Shalom met between 24 and 27 August 2013, during which they discussed issues pertaining to water development, management and protection based on the larger framework of the Memorandum of Understanding. There was high level of discussion at a technocratic level which is targeting at the further reinforcement of the cooperation and the exchange of experiences and knowledge, particularly relating to urban waste water treatment and the use of recycled water in agriculture.

== Cyprus fires in June 2016 ==
Cyprus on 18 June asked help from Israel after a fire was raging out of control in Argaka and other forest areas close to Evrychou which had approximately burned seventeen square kilometres of wild vegetation, hay and pine forest and could not be brought under control due to strong winds. Israel immediately sent three airtankers on 19 June, and an additional plane carrying 36 cubic meters of firefighting foam flew to the island on 20 June, per the Cypriot government request. Greece, Britain, Italy and France also sent helicopters and planes to aid in the firefighting efforts.

On 20 June, Israeli Prime Minister Benjamin Netanyahu before the weekly Cabinet meeting announced he was pleased his country was able to extend assistance to Cyprus in order to put out the fire that broke out near Argaka and recalled that in 2010, during the 2010 Mount Carmel forest fire, the first person to contact for assistance was the president of Cyprus Demetris Christofias. Cyprus dispatched its only helicopter and plane to assist in the fire-fighting effort.

On 28 June, Cyprus President Nicos Anastasiades thanked from his bottom of his heart the prime minister of Israel Benjamin Netanyahu in their telephone conversation.

== Educational collaboration ==
In June 2016, Cyprus and Israel signed a programme of cooperation in the sectors of culture, education and science, for a period of three years (2016-2019), during an official visit of the Cypriot Minister of Education and Culture Costas Kadis to Israel. Cyprus Minister Costas Kadis visited Israel between 22 and 23 of June, at the invitation of his Israeli counterpart Naftali Bennett. During their meeting both Ministers emphasised the importance of strengthening the cooperation of the two countries in the field of education and especially in higher education. Naftali Bennett accepted the invitation of the Cypriot Minister to visit Cyprus with representatives of Universities and Research Centres of Israel to continue the dialogue and to identify areas of common interest for cooperation in higher education.

== Cultural collaboration ==
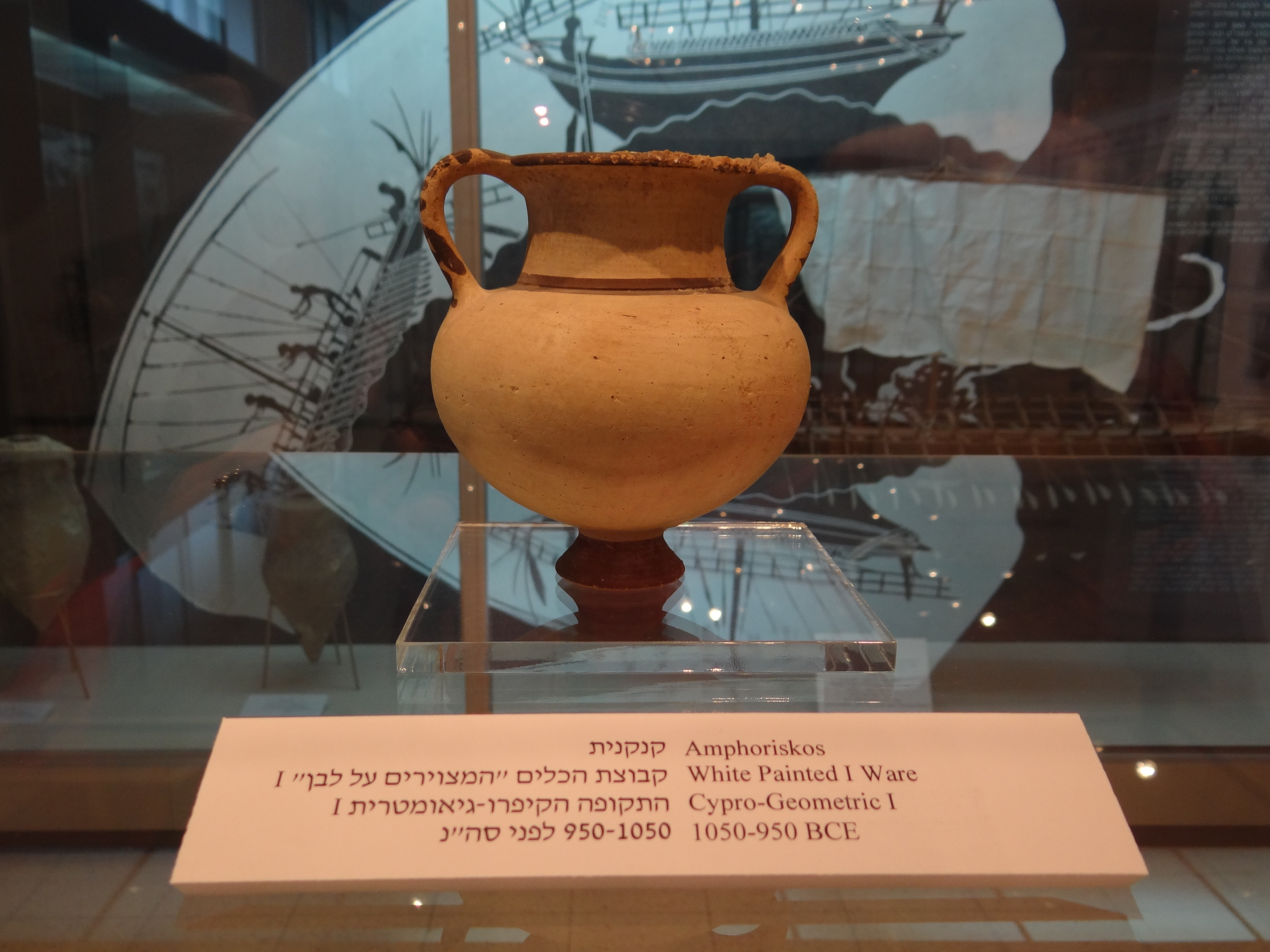
Iron-age Cypriot White Painted Ware displayed at Israeli National Maritime Museum, Haifa

With the initiative of Cyprus Ministry of Education a number of exchange programmes have been funded between Israeli and Cypriot students from years 12 to 18. The Israeli Yacht club and Famagusta District Sailing Club organised between 1–4 October 2012 the first "Cyprus-Israel Regatta" during which participants sailed from Larnaca to Tel Aviv. In August 2012 both countries signed a treaty to cooperate in forming a bank that will host the important amount of data which results from the numerous excavations that are conducted in both Israel and Cyprus. On 18 May 2013 Cypriot public was offered the opportunity to experience Israeli culture at the New Theatre Building of THOC in Nicosia through an exclusive series of cultural events and artistic happenings. Those who attended experienced some of Israel's best works of art, including theatre, children's puppet show, films and a photograph exhibition.

== Diplomacy ==
Republic of Cyprus

- Tel Aviv (Embassy)

State of Israel

- Nicosia (Embassy)

== High level visits ==
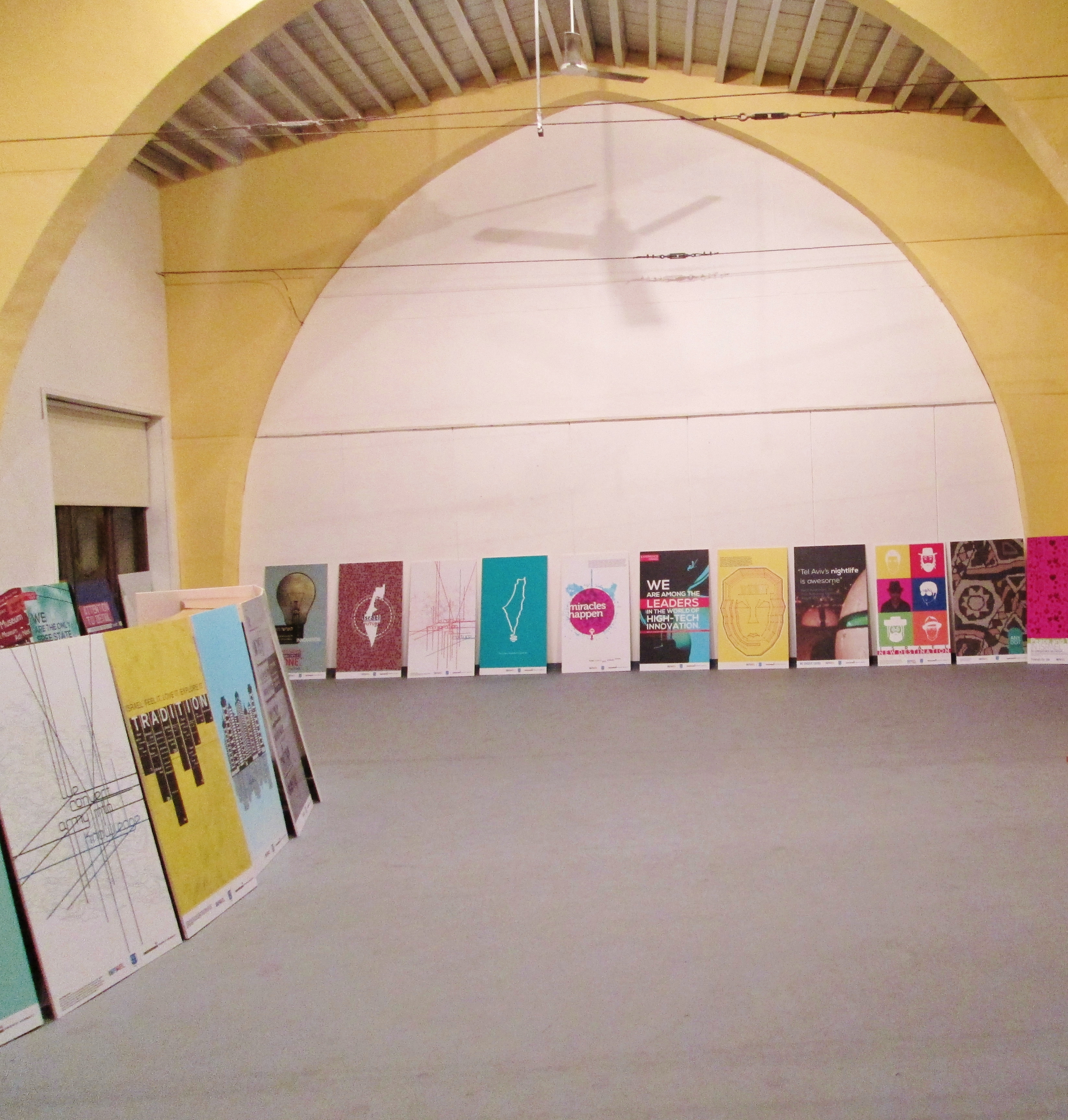
Poster exhibition about Israel in Onasagorou Street by students of Frederick University in English and Greek

Guest	Host	Place of visit	Date of visit
(Cyprus) President Demetris Christofias	(Israel) President Shimon Peres	Tel Aviv, Israel	March 2011
(Israel) President Shimon Peres	(Cyprus) President Demetris Christofias	Larnaca, Cyprus	November 2011
(Israel) Foreign Minister Avigdor Lieberman	(Cyprus) Foreign Minister Erato Kozakou-Marcoullis	Limassol, Cyprus	December 2011
Defence Minister of Cyprus Demetris Eliades	(Israel) Defence Minister Ehud Barak	Jerusalem	8 January 2012
(Cyprus) Leader of the Opposition Nicos Anastasiades	(Israel) President Shimon Peres	Jerusalem	9–12 January 2012
(Israel) Prime Minister Benjamin Netanyahu	(Cyprus) President Demetris Christofias	Nicosia, Cyprus	February 2012
(Cyprus) Foreign Minister Ioannis Kasoulidis	(Israel) Prime Minister Benjamin Netanyahu	Jerusalem	April 2013
(Cyprus) Energy Minister George Lakkotrypis	(Israel) Energy Minister Uzi Landau	Jerusalem	April 2013
(Cyprus) Defense Minister Fotis Fotiou	(Israel) Defense Minister Moshe Ya'alon	Tel Aviv, Israel	2 May 2013
(Cyprus) President Nicos Anastasiades	(Israel) Prime Minister Benjamin Netanyahu	Jerusalem	5–7 May 2013
(Israel) Minister of Energy and Water Resources Silvan Shalom	(Cyprus) Energy and Trade Minister George Lakkotrypis	Nicosia, Cyprus	8 August 2013
(Cyprus) Minister of Agriculture Nicos Kouyialis	(Israel) Minister of Energy and Water Resources Silvan Shalom	Tel Aviv, Israel	24–27 August 2013
(Israel) Knesset Speaker Yuli-Yoel Edelstein	(Cyprus) President of Parliament Yiannakis Omirou	Nicosia, Cyprus	1–3 September 2013
(Israel) Minister of Tourism Uzi Landau	(Cyprus) President Nicos Anastasiades	Nicosia, Cyprus	November 2013
(Cyprus) Minister of Defence Fotis Fotiou	(Israel) Prime Minister Benjamin Netanyahu	Jerusalem	12–13 January 2014
(Israel) Minister of Defence Moshe Ya'alon	(Cyprus) Minister of Defence Fotis Fotiou	Paphos, Cyprus	February 2014
(Cyprus) Minister of Foreign Affairs Ioannis Kasoulidis	(Israel) President Shimon Peres	Jerusalem	19–20 February 2014
(Israel) Minister of Foreign Affairs Avigdor Lieberman	(Cyprus) President Nicos Anastasiades	Nicosia, Cyprus	5–6 November 2014
(Cyprus) President Nicos Anastasiades	(Israel) Prime Minister Benjamin Netanyahu	Jerusalem	June 2015
(Israel) Prime Minister Benjamin Netanyahu	(Cyprus) President Nicos Anastasiades	Nicosia, Cyprus	28 July 2015
(Cyprus) Minister of Health Giorgos Pamporidis	(Israel) Minister of Health Yaakov Litzman	Tel Aviv, Israel	January 2016
(Israel) Minister of Defence Moshe Ya'alon	(Cyprus) Minister of Defence Christoforos Fokaides	Nicosia, Cyprus	24 February 2016
(Cyprus) Minister of Education and Culture Costas Kadis	(Israel) Minister of Education Naftali Bennett	Jerusalem	22–23 June 2016
(Cyprus) Minister of Transportation Marios Demetriadis	(Israel) Minister of Transportation Yisrael Katz	Tel Aviv, Israel	14 July 2016
(Cyprus) President Nicos Anastasiades	(Israel) Prime minister Benjamin Netanyahu	Jerusalem	24 July 2016
(Israel) President Reuven Rivlin	(Cyprus) President Nicos Anastasiades	Nicosia, Cyprus	12 February 2019
(Cyprus) President Nicos Anastasiades	(Israel) Prime minister Benjamin Netanyahu	Jerusalem, Israel	14 February 2021
(Israel) Foreign Minister Gabi Ashkenazi	(Cyprus) Foreign Minister Nikos Christodoulides	Pafos, Cyprus	April 2021
(Cyprus) Foreign Minister Nikos Christodoulides	(Israel) Foreign Minister Yair Lapid	Israel	July 2021
(Cyprus) Defense Minister Charalambos Petrides	(Israel) Defense Minister Benny Gantz	Israel	August 11 2022
(Israel) Minister of Defense Benny Gantz	(Cyprus) Lieutenant General Demokritos Zervakis	Cyprus	May-June 2022
(Israel) Defense Minister Yoav Gallant	(Cyprus) Defense Minister Michalis Giorgallas	Nicosia, Cyprus	May 5 2023
(Cyprus) President Nikos Christodoulides	(Israel) President Isaac Herzog	Israel	May 11 2023
(Cyprus) President Nikos Christodoulides	(Israel) President Isaac Herzog (Israel) Prime Minister Benjamin Netanyahu	Israel	October 21 2023
(Cyprus) Foreign Minister Constantinos Kombos	(Israel) Foreign Minister Eli Cohen (Israel) President Isaac Herzog	Israel	November 17 2023

== See also ==
- Energy Triangle
- International recognition of Israel
- Foreign relations of Cyprus
- Foreign relations of Israel
- Kindness in Cyprus
- Cyprus–Palestine relations
- Greece–Israel relations
- Israel–Turkey relations
- Lebanon-Cyprus maritime border agreement
