= Energy in Europe =

Overview of energy production, consumption, and policy in Europe

Energy in Europe encompasses the production, supply, consumption and trade of energy across the continent. European countries have diverse energy systems, reflecting differences in natural resources, infrastructure and national policies. Energy sources include oil, natural gas, coal, nuclear power, hydropower, wind power, solar power and bioenergy. Many European countries depend heavily on imported energy. In the European Union (EU), imports supplied 57% of available energy in 2024. Oil and petroleum products accounted for 38% of the EU energy mix, followed by natural gas at 21%, renewable energy at 20%, nuclear energy at 12% and solid fossil fuels at 10%.

Europe's energy system is changing as renewable energy expands, energy efficiency improves and more uses of energy are electrified. In the EU, renewables accounted for 26.2% of gross final energy consumption in 2025 and 47.3% of electricity generation. Energy security has also become a major focus since the Russian invasion of Ukraine. Under the REPowerEU plan, launched in 2022, the EU has sought to diversify energy supplies, reduce energy demand, accelerate renewable deployment and reduce its dependence on Russian energy. Russia's share of EU natural-gas imports fell from 45% in 2021 to 12% in 2025.

== Primary energy consumption by country ==
Total energy supply by country (TWh)
Country	2020	2021	2022	2023	2024	2025
Austria	315.8	327.4	307.7	306.4	309.9	304.7
Azerbaijan	182.9	195.2	207.5	214.4	202.4	198.0
Belarus	285.4	314.7	304.9	308.9	319.1	314.5
Belgium	651.2	734.5	685.5	629.8	627.2	611.7
Bulgaria	194.2	217.6	225.8	192.5	189.5	193.4
Czechia	448.8	473.2	463.2	424.5	409.2	420.9
Denmark	146.2	160.0	157.4	148.6	152.8	143.4
Finland	285.9	295.7	291.2	301.3	298.0	296.8
France	2,436	2,613	2,296	2,382	2,501	2,507
Germany	3,207	3,343	3,143	2,816	2,795	2,790
Greece	249.2	267.5	279.0	265.8	283.7	285.2
Hungary	272.8	284.4	266.2	251.3	252.1	253.6
Ireland	155.8	162.3	166.8	158.7	159.8	158.2
Italy	1,537	1,658	1,645	1,543	1,548	1,537
Kazakhstan	716.5	801.9	797.9	823.1	857.9	910.4
Lithuania	67.0	66.9	61.2	62.6	65.7	62.8
Netherlands	950.8	968.0	888.8	860.0	875.4	879.0
Norway	313.8	317.7	305.1	311.0	305.2	312.8
Poland	1,106	1,187	1,139	1,071	1,059	1,090
Portugal	223.8	222.9	225.9	218.4	214.5	218.1
Romania	336.5	354.6	329.3	321.0	322.4	316.8
Slovakia	180.3	195.1	181.1	185.5	178.2	179.9
Spain	1,277	1,368	1,435	1,378	1,413	1,444
Sweden	462.3	495.1	481.1	461.4	468.7	459.6
Switzerland	254.6	234.6	254.3	261.8	267.3	243.9
Turkey	1,711	1,867	1,860	1,851	1,946	2,033
Turkmenistan	414.4	429.4	456.2	430.0	384.4	427.8
Ukraine	948.7	976.2	656.1	627.9	631.8	661.9
United Kingdom	1,848	1,874	1,865	1,781	1,771	1,748
Uzbekistan	530.0	581.0	562.1	576.9	574.0	591.0

Source: Energy Institute

=== Primary energy consumption per capita ===
Country	Year	Total energy supply (TWh)	Population (million)	MWh/person
Germany	2025	2,790	84.08	33.2
France	2025	2,507	66.65	37.6
Turkey	2025	2,033	87.67	23.2
United Kingdom	2025	1,748	69.56	25.1
Italy	2025	1,537	59.14	26.0
Spain	2025	1,444	47.90	30.1
Poland	2025	1,090	38.15	28.6
Kazakhstan	2025	910	20.84	43.7
Netherlands	2025	879	18.35	47.9
Ukraine	2025	662	38.98	17.0
Belgium	2025	612	11.76	52.0
Sweden	2025	460	10.66	43.1
Czechia	2025	421	10.61	39.7
Romania	2025	317	18.91	16.8
Belarus	2025	315	9.00	35.0
Norway	2025	313	5.62	55.6
Austria	2025	305	9.11	33.4
Finland	2025	297	5.62	52.8
Greece	2025	285	9.94	28.7
Switzerland	2025	244	8.97	27.2
Portugal	2025	218	10.41	20.9
Azerbaijan	2025	198	10.40	19.0
Bulgaria	2025	193	6.71	28.8
Ireland	2025	158	5.31	29.8
Denmark	2025	143	6.00	23.9
Croatia	2025	90.6	3.85	23.5
Iceland	2025	82.4	0.40	206.9
Estonia	2025	50.0	1.34	37.2
Armenia	2024	49.8	2.97	16.7
Malta	2024	36.3	0.54	67.3
Moldova	2024	36.0	3.03	11.8
Luxembourg	2025	34.1	0.68	50.1
Cyprus	2025	32.5	1.37	23.7

Mtoe = 11.63 TWh primary energy, includes energy losses

== Oil ==
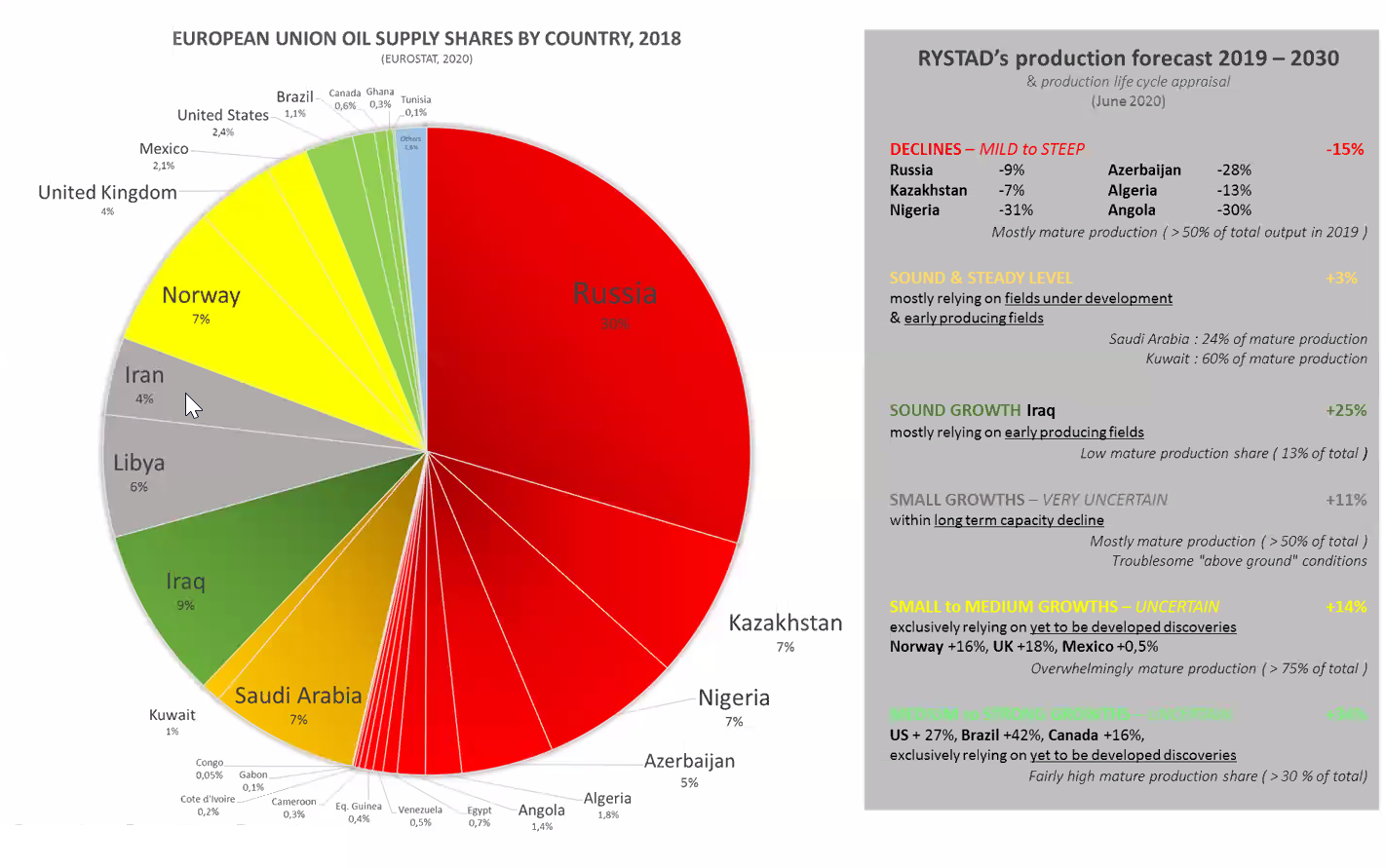
Oil sources for the European Union with tendency forecast.

Oil is one of the largest primary energy sources in Europe. It is mostly used for transportation and heating. Oil production is relatively low in Europe, with significant production only in the North Sea. Most of Europe's oil comes from imports (about 90% for the EU28).

== Fossil gas ==
Fossil gas tends to be supplied from north and south Europe.

== Electricity ==
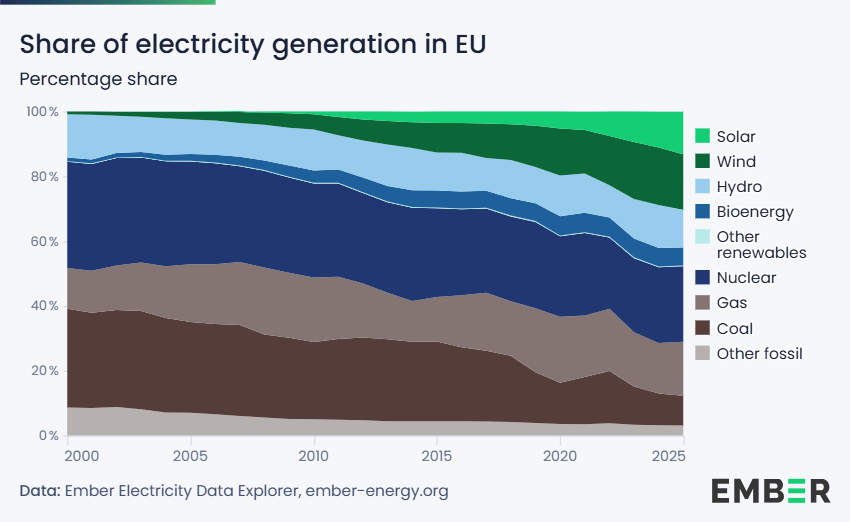
Electricity generation in the EU by source - percentage share

=== Renewable energy ===
The twelve newer EU Member States in Central and Eastern Europe planned to increase wind power capacity from the 6.4 gigawatts installed at the end of 2012 to 16 gigawatts by 2020.

If renewable electricity production in the EU continued to grow at the same rate as it did from 2005 to 2010, it would account for 36.4% of electricity in 2020 and 51.6% in 2030, following:

Renewable energy as a percentage of total electricity
2005	2006	2007	2008	2009	2010	2020	2030
13.6	14.2	15	16.4	18.2	21	36	52

In March 2022, the European Commission released its comprehensive "REPowerEU" plan to promote renewable energy in Europe.

=== Generation and consumption ===
2021 Electricity in Europe – Generation and Consumption (GWh)
Country	Generation											Consumption	Imports	Exports	Distribution losses
Country	Total	Nuclear	Fossil fuels	Renewable							Hydro- electric pumped storage	Consumption	Imports	Exports	Distribution losses
Country	Total	Nuclear	Fossil fuels	Total	Hydro- electricity	Geo- thermal	Tide and wave	Solar	Wind	Biomass and waste	Hydro- electric pumped storage	Consumption	Imports	Exports	Distribution losses
European Union	2,753,320	696,341	1,002,188	1,064,830	343,436	6,177	503	163,321	383,203	168,191	-10,039	2,585,288	399,051	391,828	175,256
Austria	64,227	0	13,752	52,135	38,751	0	0	2,722	6,460	4,202	-1,660	68,534	26,436	18,893	3,236
Belgium	94,864	47,892	24,521	22,749	393	0	0	5,568	11,692	5,096	-298	83,413	15,194	23,070	3,574
Bulgaria	41,529	16,487	16,935	8,327	4,819	0	0	1,497	1,421	590	-220	30,321	1,857	10,635	2
Croatia	14,603	0	4,243	10,421	7,128	75	0	149	2,058	1,012	-60	15,932	11	7,545	2
Cyprus	4,878	0	4,100	777	0	0	0	477	244	57	0	4,659	0	0	0
Czechia	76,641	29,042	37,831	10,130	2,409	0	0	2,184	594	4,943	-362	61,915	15,153	26,228	3,651
Denmark	32,793	0	7,169	25,624	16	0	0	1,278	16,034	8,295	0	38,183	19,445	12,979	1,076
Estonia	6,653	0	3,498	3,155	25	0	0	305	741	2,084	0	8,842	7,333	4,704	440
Finland	69,653	22,630	9,534	37,489	15,766	0	0	305	8,186	13,232	0	83,725	23,999	6,713	3,215
France	530,418	360,704	48,048	123,210	58,857	133	484	15,095	36,908	11,733	-1,543	447,447	24,532	69,369	38,134
Germany	557,144	65,441	260,790	233,000	19,252	249	0	49,992	113,624	49,883	-2,087	511,660	51,336	70,237	26,582
Greece	52,474	0	30,839	21,660	5,909	0	0	5,106	10,471	174	-25	52,140	7,583	3,898	4,020
Hungary	34,191	15,110	12,093	6,988	202	12	0	3,896	645	2,233	0	43,914	19,967	7,213	3,031
Ireland	33,596	0	22,346	11,472	750	0	0	79	9,712	930	-222	32,645	2,309	863	2,397
Italy	274,179	0	159,842	115,192	44,739	5,530	0	25,039	20,687	19,198	-856	299,922	46,564	3,770	17,051
Latvia	5,538	0	1,958	3,581	2,689	0	0	7	137	748	0	6,917	4,667	2,895	394
Lithuania	3,704	0	1,341	2,624	384	0	0	191	1,354	695	-261	11,822	12,479	3,435	926
Luxembourg	921	0	261	1,044	107	0	0	223	335	379	-384	6,496	6,758	1,037	147
Malta	2,112	0	1,848	264	0	0	0	256	1	7	0	2,495	547	36	0
Netherlands	117,440	3,618	74,901	38,921	84	0	0	12,655	18,004	8,177	0	113,278	20,885	20,632	4,414
Poland	166,557	0	136,021	30,898	2,339	0	0	3,831	16,181	8,547	-363	158,194	15,100	14,212	9,250
Portugal	47,469	0	16,745	31,146	11,846	178	0	2,192	13,055	3,874	-422	47,743	9,545	4,792	4,480
Romania	55,019	10,377	18,547	26,195	17,377	0	0	1,703	6,508	608	-100	50,527	8,697	6,499	7
Slovakia	27,194	14,590	6,010	6,702	4,170	0	0	672	6	1,854	-108	26,103	13,886	13,098	1,879
Slovenia	14,852	5,419	4,114	5,419	4,712	0	0	453	6	248	-100	13,727	8,387	8,658	854
Spain	259,404	54,040	83,365	122,944	29,626	0	19	25,938	60,833	6,528	-946	233,977	17,388	16,506	26,309
Sweden	165,267	50,992	1,534	112,762	71,086	0	0	1,507	27,306	12,863	-21	130,756	8,341	33,910	8,942

== See also ==
- Energy efficiency in Europe (study)
- European countries by fossil fuel use (% of total energy)
- European countries by electricity consumption per person
