= Embassy of Cyprus, Washington, D.C. =

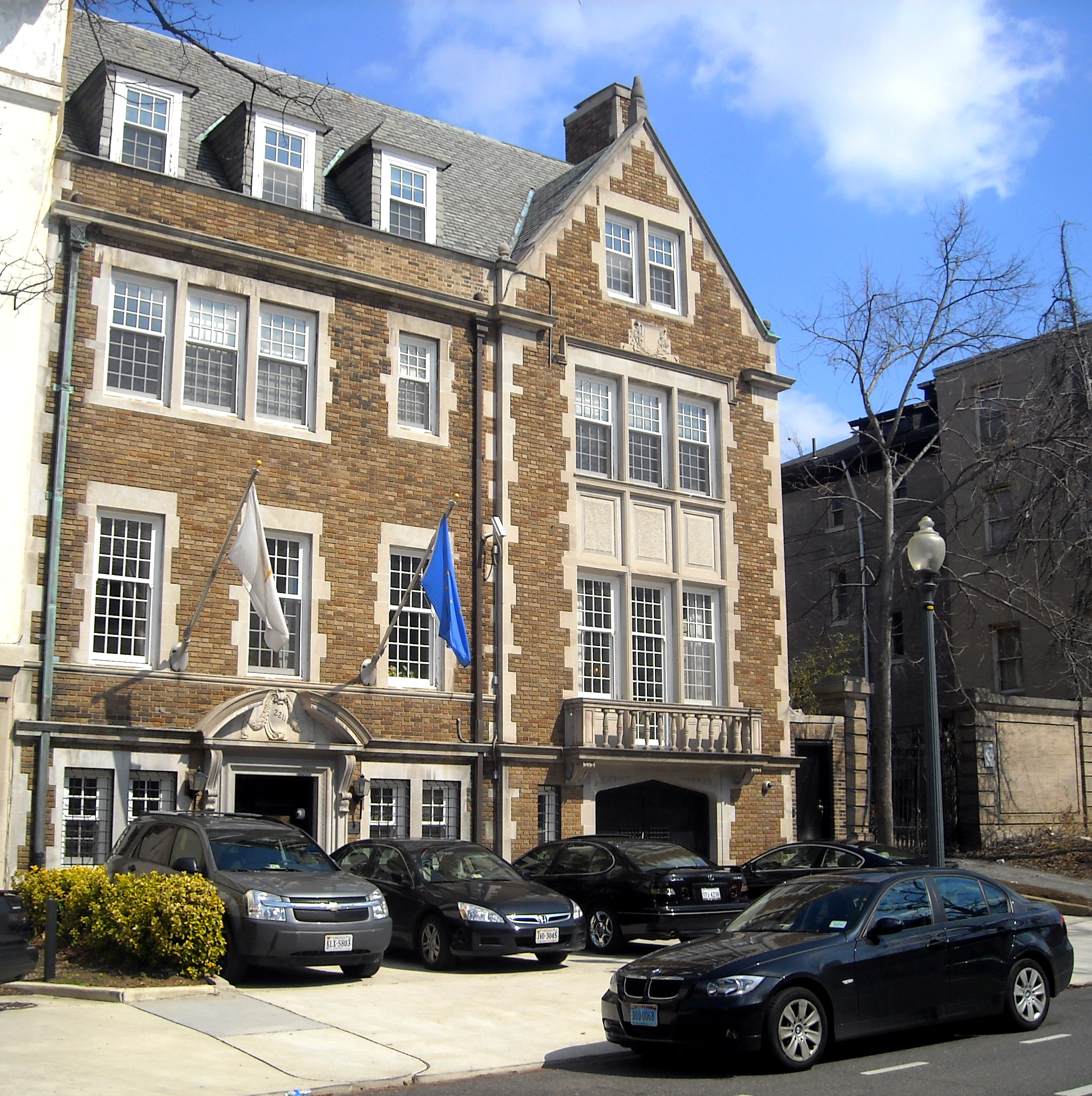
- Location: Washington, D.C.
- Address: 2211 R Street, N.W.
- Coordinates: 38°54′46.1″N 77°2′57.8″W
- Ambassador: Evangelos Savva

The Embassy of Cyprus in Washington, D.C. is the Republic of Cyprus's diplomatic mission to the United States. It is located at 2211 R Street N.W. in Washington, D.C.'s Kalorama neighborhood.

The Ambassador is Evangelos Savva, who is concurrently the non-resident ambassador to the nation of Barbados.

== Building ==
The building, a combination of Tudorbethan and Jacobean architecture, is a contributing property to the Sheridan-Kalorama Historic District and valued at $5,273,190.
