= Alexis Michaelides =

Cypriot politician

Alexis Michaelides (Greek: Άλεξις Μιχαηλίδης) served as the deputy mayor of Larnaca, Cyprus between 2001 and 2012.

== Profile ==
Alexis Michaelides was born in Larnaca in 1950. He holds a B.A and a M.A. in Public Administration, and a M.A. in Business Administration. Since 1976 he is the director of a family company in Larnaca in which he is also a partner. He is the writer or co-writer of several books and editions about Larnaca and an article writer in the local press since 1983. A member of several societies with notable intellectual and cultural activities.

He is a member of the Democratic Party (Cyprus) central committee since 1987 and a member of Youth and Local Larnaca Committees since 1976, as well as member of the study committees of the same party.

In 1991 and 1996 he was elected Municipal Councilor of Larnaca and in 2001 and 2006 he was elected deputy Mayor of Larnaca. He represents the Municipality of Larnaca in numerous European Union programs financed by the European Commission since 1993, and in several networks of European and Mediterranean cities since 2002. An .

He is a member of the governing board of the Pierides Foundation, which operates more than 10 Museums in Greece and Cyprus, and the Sewerage Board of Larnaca. Between 2002 and 2007 he was a member of the governing board of the Larnaca Water Board. Further, he is a founding member of the Peripheral and Municipal Theatre Co. SKALA of Larnaca Ltd, and a member of its Board since 1998.

A member of athletic clubs like AEK Larnaca and the Larnaca Tennis Club. He also served on the Board of the Cyprus Tennis Federation between the years 1981-1992. The vice president of the Board Tsinikola Philanthropic Foundation since 2002, the president of the Larnaca branch of the Committee for the Wellbeing of the Elderly (ESEIL) and vice president of the all Cyprus Committee since 2007 (POSEI).

His position in the Larnaca Municipal Council since 1992, gave him the opportunity to notably contribute in the promotion of civilization and culture. He is a donor of collections in the Historical City Archives Museum of Larnaca, the Byzantine Museum of Saint Lazarus and the Municipal Museum of Natural History.

He enjoys playing tennis and he has been a champion in several doubles all island events during 1980-1985, and later in several veteran international events held in Cyprus between 1995 till today. He is married to Elena Antoniades with three children.

As per his personal website, Michaelides is fluent in English and has some knowledge of He has excellent knowledge of French.
