= Ministry of Foreign Affairs (Cyprus) =

Ministry of Foreign Affairs Cyprus
- Υπουργείο Εξωτερικών
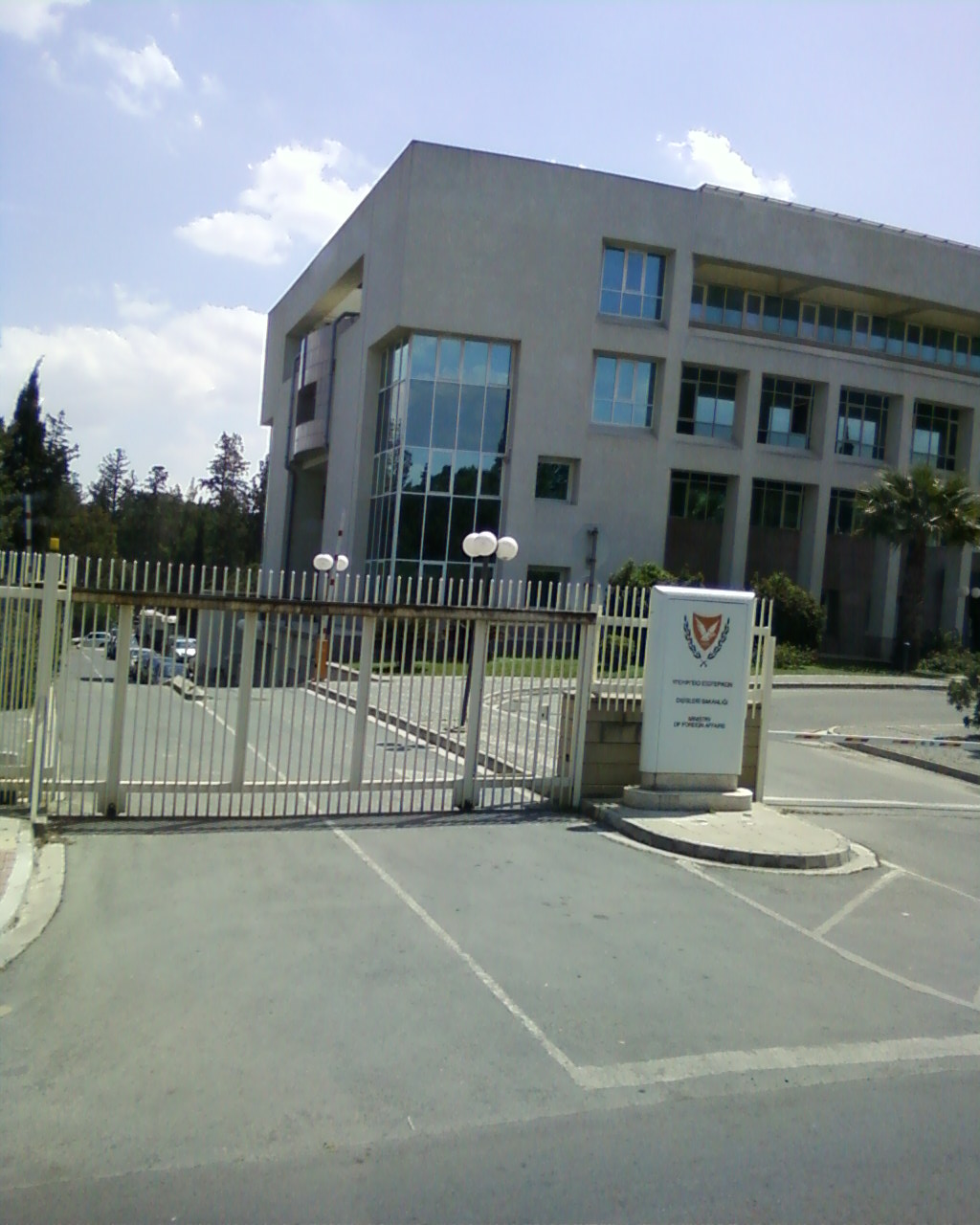

Agency overview
- Formed: November 25, 1960; 65 years ago (Officially established)
- Jurisdiction: Government of Cyprus
- Headquarters: Foreign Ministry, Nicosia, Cyprus; 35.1564°N 33.3507°E
- Annual budget: €102.789.084
- Minister responsible: Kostantinos Kombos
- Permanent Secretary responsible: Andreas Kakouris
- Website: mfa.gov.cy

The Cypriot Ministry of Foreign Affairs (Greek: Υπουργείο Εξωτερικών της Κυπριακής Δημοκρατίας), is a ministry in the Republic of Cyprus. The primary mission of the Ministry is to exercise the foreign policy of Cyprus and to advance its interests alongside protection of its citizens abroad.

== History ==
On 7 September 1960, upon the founding of the Republic of Cyprus, Spyros Kyprianou was designated as the first Minister of Foreign Affairs. The Ministry was established by law on November 25, 1961, and has been at the forefront of Cypriot foreign policy and more specifically active in increasing awareness of the Turkish invasion of Cyprus.

== Diplomatic missions ==
Cyprus maintains diplomatic relations with multiple countries and currently has 42 Embassies/High Commissions, 6 Consulates General, 1 Representation Office and 4 Permanent Missions/Representations to various International Organisations.

== Ministers of foreign affairs ==
Minister	Began	Ended
Spyros Kyprianou	16 August 1960	15 June 1972
Ioannis Christophides	16 June 1972	8 March 1978
Nicos A. Rolandis	3 March 1978	21 September 1983
Georgios Iacovou	22 September 1983	27 February 1993
Alekos Michaelides	28 February 1993	8 April 1997
Ioannis Kasoulidis	9 April 1997	28 February 2003
Georgios Iacovou	1 March 2003	12 June 2006
Giorgos Lillikas	13 June 2006	16 July 2007
Erato Kozakou-Marcoullis	16 July 2007	2 March 2008
Markos Kyprianou	3 March 2008	5 August 2011
Erato Kozakou-Marcoullis	5 August 2011	1 March 2013
Ioannis Kasoulides	1 March 2013	1 March 2018
Nikos Christodoulides	1 March 2018	11 January 2022
Ioannis Kasoulides	11 January 2022	28 February 2023
Constantinos Kombos	1 March 2023	Incumbent

== See also ==
- Foreign relations of Cyprus
- List of ministers of foreign affairs of Cyprus
