= List of foreign ministers in 1989 =

This is a list of foreign ministers in 1989.

== Africa ==
Flag	Country	Foreign minister	Term
(Algeria)	Algeria	Boualem Bessaïh; Sid Ahmed Ghozali	1988-1989; 1989-1991
(Angola)	Angola	Afonso Van-Dunem; Pedro de Castro van Dúnem	1985-1989; 1989-1992
(Benin)	Benin	Guy Landry Hazoumé; Daniel Tawéma	1987-1989; 1989-1990
(Botswana)	Botswana	Gaositwe K.T. Chiepe	1985-1994
(Burkina Faso)	Burkina Faso	Jean-Marc Palm; Issou Go; Prosper Vokouma	1987-1989; 1989; 1989-1992
(Burundi)	Burundi	Cyprien Mbonimpa	1987-1992
(Cameroon)	Cameroon	Jacques-Roger Booh-Booh	1988-1992
(Cape Verde)	Cape Verde	Silvino Manuel da Luz	1981-1991
(Central African Republic)	Central African Republic	Michel Gbezera-Bria	1988-1990
(Chad)	Chad	Gouara Lassou; Acheikh ibn Oumar	1984-1989; 1989-1990
(Comoros)	Comoros	Said Kafe	1982-1990
(Republic of the Congo)	Congo	Antoine Ndinga Oba	1985-1991
(Ivory Coast)	Côte d'Ivoire	Siméon Aké	1977-1990
(Djibouti)	Djibouti	Moumin Bahdon Farah	1978-1993
(Egypt)	Egypt	Ahmed Asmat Abdel-Meguid	1984-1991
(Equatorial Guinea)	Equatorial Guinea	Marcelino Nguema Onguene	1983-1990
(Ethiopia)	Ethiopia	Berhanu Bayeh; Tesfaye Dinka	1986-1989; 1989-1991
(Gabon)	Gabon	Martin Bongo; Ali Bongo Ondimba	1976-1989; 1989-1991
(The Gambia)	The Gambia	Omar Sey	1987-1994
(Ghana)	Ghana	Obed Asamoah	1981-1997
(Guinea)	Guinea	Jean Traoré	1985-1993
(Guinea-Bissau)	Guinea-Bissau	Júlio Semedo	1984-1992
(Kenya)	Kenya	Robert Ouko	1988-1990
(Lesotho)	Lesotho	Thaabe Letsie	1988-1990
(Liberia)	Liberia	J. Rudolph Johnson	1987-1990
(Libya)	Libya	Jadallah Azzuz at-Talhi	1987-1990
(Madagascar)	Madagascar	Jean Bemananjara	1983-1991
(Malawi)	Malawi	Hastings Banda	1964-1993
(Mali)	Mali	Modibo Keita; N'Golo Traoré	1986-1989; 1989-1991
(Mauritania)	Mauritania	Mohamed Sidina Ould Sidiya; Sid Ahmed Ould Baba	1988-1989; 1989-1990
(Mauritius)	Mauritius	Sir Satcam Boolell	1986-1990
(Morocco)	Morocco	Abdellatif Filali	1985-1999
(Mozambique)	Mozambique	Pascoal Mocumbi	1987-1994
(Niger)	Niger	Allélé Habibou; Mahamane Sani Bako	1988-1989; 1989-1991
(Nigeria)	Nigeria	Ike Nwachukwu; Rilwanu Lukman	1987-1989; 1989-1990
(Rwanda)	Rwanda	François Ngarukiyintwali; Casimir Bizimungu	1979-1989; 1989-1992
(São Tomé and Príncipe)	São Tomé and Príncipe	Carlos Graça	1988-1990
(Senegal)	Senegal	Ibrahima Fall	1984-1990
(Seychelles)	Seychelles	France-Albert René; Danielle de St. Jorre	1984-1989; 1989-1997
(Sierra Leone)	Sierra Leone	Abdul Karim Koroma	1985-1992
(Somalia)	Somalia	Siad Barre; Abdirahman Jama Barre	1988-1989; 1989-1990
(South Africa)	South Africa	Pik Botha	1977-1994
(Sudan)	Sudan	Hussein Suleiman Abu Saleh; Hassan al-Turabi; Ali Sahloul	1988-1989; 1989; 1989-1993
(Eswatini)	Swaziland	Sir George Mbikwakhe Mamba	1987-1993
(Tanzania)	Tanzania	Benjamin Mkapa	1984-1990
(Togo)	Togo	Yaovi Adodo	1987-1991
(Tunisia)	Tunisia	Abdelhamid Escheikh; Ismail Khelil	1988-1990
(Uganda)	Uganda	Paul Ssemogerere	1988-1994
(Western Sahara)	Western Sahara	Mohamed Salem Ould Salek	1988-1995
(Zaire)	Zaire	Jean Nguza Karl-i-Bond	1988-1990
(Zambia)	Zambia	Luke Mwananshiku	1986-1990
(Zimbabwe)	Zimbabwe	Nathan Shamuyarira	1987-1995

== Asia ==
Flag	Country	Foreign minister	Term
(Afghanistan)	Afghanistan	Abdul Wakil	1986-1992
(Bahrain)	Bahrain	Sheikh Muhammad ibn Mubarak ibn Hamad Al Khalifah	1971-2005
(Bangladesh)	Bangladesh	Anisul Islam Mahmud	1988-1990
(Bhutan)	Bhutan	Dawa Tsering	1972-1998
(Brunei)	Brunei	Pengiran Muda Mohamed Bolkiah	1984–2015
(Cambodia)	Cambodia	Hun Sen	1987-1990
(China)	China (People's Republic)	Qian Qichen	1988-1998
(India)	India	P. V. Narasimha Rao; V. P. Singh; I. K. Gujral	1988-1989; 1989; 1989-1990
(Indonesia)	Indonesia	Ali Alatas	1988-1999
(Iran)	Iran	Ali Akbar Velayati	1981-1997
(Iraq)	Iraq	Tariq Aziz	1983-1991
(Israel)	Israel	Moshe Arens	1988-1990
(Japan)	Japan	Sōsuke Uno; Hiroshi Mitsuzuka; Taro Nakayama	1987-1989; 1989; 1989-1991
(Jordan)	Jordan	Marwan al-Qasim	1988-1991
(North Korea)	North Korea	Kim Yong-nam	1983-1998
(South Korea)	South Korea	Choe Ho-jung	1988-1990
(Kuwait)	Kuwait	Sheikh Sabah Al-Ahmad Al-Jaber Al-Sabah	1978-2003
(Laos)	Laos	Phoune Sipraseuth	1975-1993
(Lebanon)	Lebanon	Selim Hoss	1987-1990
(Malaysia)	Malaysia	Abu Hassan Omar	1987-1991
(Maldives)	Maldives	Fathulla Jameel	1978-2005
(Mongolia)	Mongolia	Tserenpiliin Gombosüren	1988-1996
(Myanmar)	Myanmar	Saw Maung	1988-1991
(Nepal)	Nepal	Shailendra Kumar Upadhyaya	1986-1990
(Oman)	Oman	Yusuf bin Alawi bin Abdullah	1982–2020
(Pakistan)	Pakistan	Sahabzada Yaqub Khan	1988-1991
(Philippines)	Philippines	Raul Manglapus	1987-1992
(Qatar)	Qatar	Sheikh Ahmad ibn Sayf Al Thani; Abdullah ibn Khalifa al-Attiyah	1985-1989; 1989-1990
(Saudi Arabia)	Saudi Arabia	Prince Saud bin Faisal bin Abdulaziz Al Saud	1975–2015
(Singapore)	Singapore	Wong Kan Seng	1988-1994
(Sri Lanka)	Sri Lanka	Abdul Cader Shahul Hameed; Ranjan Wijeratne	1978-1989; 1989-1990
(Syria)	Syria	Farouk al-Sharaa	1984-2006
(Taiwan)	Taiwan (Republic of China)	Lien Chan	1988-1990
(Thailand)	Thailand	Siddhi Savetsila	1980-1990
(Turkey)	Turkey	Mesut Yılmaz	1987-1990
(United Arab Emirates)	United Arab Emirates	Rashid Abdullah Al Nuaimi	1980-2006
(Vietnam)	Vietnam	Nguyễn Cơ Thạch	1980-1991
(Yemen Arab Republic)	North Yemen	Abd al-Karim al-Iryani	1984-1990
(South Yemen)	South Yemen	Abdul Aziz al-Dali	1982-1990

== Australia and Oceania ==
Flag	Country	Foreign minister	Term
(Australia)	Australia	Gareth Evans	1988-1996
(Fiji)	Fiji	Ratu Sir Kamisese Mara	1988-1992
(Kiribati)	Kiribati	Ieremia Tabai	1983-1991
(Marshall Islands)	Marshall Islands	Tom Kijiner	1988-1994
(Federated States of Micronesia)	Micronesia	Andon Amaraich	1979-1991
(Nauru)	Nauru	Hammer DeRoburt; Kenas Aroi; Bernard Dowiyogo	1986-1989; 1989; 1989-1995
(New Zealand) (Cook Islands)	New Zealand Cook Islands	Russell Marshall Norman George; Inatio Akaruru	1987-1990 1983-1989; 1989-1999
(Papua New Guinea)	Papua New Guinea	Sir Michael Somare	1988-1992
(Solomon Islands)	Solomon Islands	Sir Peter Kenilorea; Sir Baddeley Devesi	1988-1989; 1989-1990
(Tonga)	Tonga	Prince Tupouto'a Tungi	1979-1998
(Tuvalu)	Tuvalu	Tomasi Puapua; Bikenibeu Paeniu	1981-1989; 1989-1993
(Vanuatu)	Vanuatu	Donald Kalpokas	1987-1991
(Samoa)	Western Samoa	Tofilau Eti Alesana	1988-1998

== Europe ==
Flag	Country	Foreign minister	Term
(Albania)	Albania	Reiz Malile	1982-1991
(Austria)	Austria	Alois Mock	1987-1995
(Belgium) (Brussels) (Wallonia)	Belgium Brussels-Capital Region Wallonia	Leo Tindemans; Mark Eyskens Jos Chabert Albert Liénard	1981-1989; 1989-1992 1989-1999 1988-1992
(Bulgaria)	Bulgaria	Petar Mladenov; Boiko Dimitrov	1971-1989; 1989-1990
(Cyprus) (Northern Cyprus)	Cyprus Northern Cyprus	Georgios Iacovou Kenan Atakol	1983-1993 1985-1993
(Czechoslovakia)	Czechoslovakia	Jaromír Johanes; Jiří Dienstbier	1988-1989; 1989-1992
(Denmark)	Denmark	Uffe Ellemann-Jensen	1982-1993
(Finland)	Finland	Kalevi Sorsa; Pertti Paasio	1987-1989; 1989-1991
(France)	France	Roland Dumas	1988-1993
(East Germany)	East Germany	Oskar Fischer	1975-1990
(West Germany)	West Germany	Hans-Dietrich Genscher	1982-1992
(Greece)	Greece	Karolos Papoulias; Tzannis Tzannetakis; Georgios Papoulias; Antonis Samaras	1985-1989; 1989; 1989; 1989-1990
(Hungary)	Hungary	Péter Várkonyi; Gyula Horn	1983-1989; 1989-1990
(Iceland)	Iceland	Jón Baldvin Hannibalsson	1988-1995
(Republic of Ireland)	Ireland	Brian Lenihan; Gerry Collins	1987-1989; 1989-1992
(Italy)	Italy	Giulio Andreotti; Gianni De Michelis	1983-1989; 1989-1992
(Liechtenstein)	Liechtenstein	Hans Brunhart	1978-1993
(Luxembourg)	Luxembourg	Jacques Poos	1984-1999
(Malta)	Malta	Ċensu Tabone; Guido de Marco	1987-1989; 1989-1996
(Netherlands)	Netherlands	Hans van den Broek	1982-1993
(Norway)	Norway	Thorvald Stoltenberg; Kjell Magne Bondevik	1987-1989; 1989-1990
(Poland)	Poland	Tadeusz Olechowski; Krzysztof Skubiszewski	1988-1989; 1989-1993
(Portugal)	Portugal	João de Deus Pinheiro	1987-1992
(Romania) (Romania)	Romania	Ioan Totu; Ion Stoian; Sergiu Celac	1986-1989; 1989; 1989-1990
(San Marino)	San Marino	Gabriele Gatti	1986-2002
(Soviet Union) (Russian Soviet Federative Socialist Republic) (Ukrainian Soviet Socialist Republic) (Byelorussian Soviet Socialist Republic) (Moldavian Soviet Socialist Republic) (Estonian Soviet Socialist Republic) (Latvian Soviet Socialist Republic) (Lithuanian Soviet Socialist Republic) (Georgian Soviet Socialist Republic) (Armenian Soviet Socialist Republic) (Azerbaijan Soviet Socialist Republic) (Kazakh Soviet Socialist Republic) (Uzbek Soviet Socialist Republic) (Turkmen Soviet Socialist Republic) (Tajik Soviet Socialist Republic) (Kirghiz Soviet Socialist Republic)	Soviet Union Russian SFSR Ukrainian SSR Byelorussian SSR Moldavian SSR Estonian SSR Latvian SSR Lithuanian SSR Georgian SSR Armenian SSR Azerbaijan SSR Kazakh SSR Uzbek SSR Turkmen SSR Tajik SSR Kirghiz SSR	Eduard Shevardnadze Vladimir Vinogradov Volodymyr Kravets Anatoly Gurinovich Pyotr Komendant Petru Comendant Leonards Bartkēvičs Vladislovas Mikučiauskas Georgy Dzhavakhishvili Anatoly Mkrtchyan Huseynagha Sadigov Mikhail Isinaliyev; Akmaral Arystanbekova Sarvar Azimov Tuvakbibi Amangeldyeva Usman Usmanov; Lakim Kayumov Roza Otunbayeva; Zhanyl Tumenbayeva	1985-1991 1982-1990 1984-1990 1966-1990 1981-1990 1981-1990 1985-1990 1988-1990 1985-1990 1986-1991 1988-1992 1981-1989; 1989-1991 1988-1991 1988-1990 1984-1989; 1989-1992 1986-1989; 1989-1991
(Spain)	Spain	Francisco Fernández Ordóñez	1985-1992
(Sweden)	Sweden	Sten Andersson	1985-1991
(Switzerland)	Switzerland	René Felber	1988-1993
(United Kingdom)	United Kingdom	Sir Geoffrey Howe; John Major; Douglas Hurd	1983-1989; 1989; 1989-1995
(Vatican City)	Vatican City	Archbishop Angelo Sodano	1988-1990
(Socialist Federal Republic of Yugoslavia) (Socialist Republic of Montenegro) (Socialist Republic of Serbia)	Yugoslavia Montenegro Serbia	Budimir Lončar Igor Jovović Božo Jovanović; Aleksandar Prlja	1987-1991 1985-1990 1986-1989; 1989-1991

== North America and the Caribbean ==
Flag	Country	Foreign minister	Term
(Antigua and Barbuda)	Antigua and Barbuda	Lester Bird	1982-1991
(The Bahamas)	The Bahamas	Clement T. Maynard	1984-1992
(Barbados)	Barbados	Sir James Cameron Tudor; Maurice King	1986-1989; 1989-1993
(Belize)	Belize	Dean Barrow; Said Musa	1985-1989; 1989-1993
(Canada) (Quebec)	Canada Quebec	Joe Clark Paul Gobeil; John Ciaccia	1984-1991 1988-1989; 1989-1994
(Costa Rica)	Costa Rica	Rodrigo Madrigal Nieto	1986-1990
(Cuba)	Cuba	Isidoro Malmierca Peoli	1976-1992
(Dominica)	Dominica	Eugenia Charles	1980-1990
(Dominican Republic)	Dominican Republic	Joaquín Ricardo García	1988-1991
(El Salvador)	El Salvador	Ricardo Acevedo Peralta; José Manuel Pacas Castro	1986-1989; 1989-1994
(Grenada)	Grenada	Ben Jones	1984-1990
(Guatemala)	Guatemala	Alfonso Cabrera Hidalgo; Mario Palencia Lainfiesta; Ariel Rivera Irias	1986-1989; 1989; 1989-1991
(Haiti)	Haiti	Serge Élie Charles; Yvon Perrier	1988-1989; 1989-1990
(Honduras)	Honduras	Carlos López Contreras	1986-1990
(Jamaica)	Jamaica	Hugh Shearer; David Coore	1980-1989; 1989-1993
(Mexico)	Mexico	Fernando Solana	1988-1993
(Nicaragua)	Nicaragua	Miguel d'Escoto Brockmann	1979-1990
(Panama)	Panama	Jorge Eduardo Ritter; Gustavo R. González; Leonardo Kam; Julio Linares	1988-1989; 1989; 1989; 1989-1993
(Puerto Rico)	Puerto Rico	Sila M. Calderon	1988–1990
(Saint Kitts and Nevis)	Saint Kitts and Nevis	Kennedy Simmonds	1983-1995
(Saint Lucia)	Saint Lucia	Neville Cenac	1987-1992
(Saint Vincent and the Grenadines)	Saint Vincent and the Grenadines	James Fitz-Allen Mitchell	1984-1992
(Trinidad and Tobago)	Trinidad and Tobago	Sahadeo Basdeo	1988-1991
(United States)	United States	George P. Shultz; Michael Armacost (acting); James Baker	1982-1989; 1989; 1989-1992

== South America ==
Flag	Country	Foreign minister	Term
(Argentina)	Argentina	Dante Caputo; Susana Ruiz Cerutti; Domingo Cavallo	1983-1989; 1989; 1989-1991
(Bolivia)	Bolivia	Guillermo Bedregal Gutiérrez; Valentín Abecia Baldivieso; Carlos Iturralde Ballivián	1986-1989; 1989; 1989-1992
(Brazil)	Brazil	Roberto Costa de Abreu Sodré	1986-1990
(Chile)	Chile	Hernán Felipe Errázuriz	1988-1990
(Colombia)	Colombia	Julio Londoño Paredes	1986-1990
(Ecuador)	Ecuador	Diego Cordovez Zegers	1988-1992
(Guyana)	Guyana	Rashleigh E. Jackson	1978-1990
(Paraguay)	Paraguay	Rodney Elpidio Acevedo; Luis María Argaña	1988-1989; 1989-1990
(Peru)	Peru	Luis González Posada; Guillermo Larco Cox	1988-1989; 1989-1990
(Suriname)	Suriname	E.J. Sedoc	1988-1990
(Uruguay)	Uruguay	Luis Barrios Tassano	1988-1990
(Venezuela)	Venezuela	Germán Nava Carrillo; Enrique Tejera París; Reinaldo Figueredo	1988-1989; 1989; 1989-1992
