= List of ministers of foreign affairs of Cyprus =

This is a list of ministers of foreign affairs of the Republic of Cyprus since the independence in 1960:

Image	Minister	Began	Ended
	Spyros Kyprianou	16 August 1960	15 June 1972
	Ioannis Christophides	16 June 1972	8 March 1978
	Nicos A. Rolandis	3 March 1978	21 September 1983
	Georgios Iacovou	22 September 1983	27 February 1993
	Alekos Michaelides	28 February 1993	8 April 1997
	Ioannis Kasoulidis	9 April 1997	28 February 2003
	Georgios Iacovou	1 March 2003	12 June 2006
	Giorgos Lillikas	13 June 2006	16 July 2007
	Erato Kozakou-Marcoullis	16 July 2007	2 March 2008
	Markos Kyprianou	3 March 2008	5 August 2011
	Erato Kozakou-Marcoullis	5 August 2011	1 March 2013
	Ioannis Kasoulides	1 March 2013	1 March 2018
	Nikos Christodoulides	1 March 2018	11 January 2022
	Ioannis Kasoulides	11 January 2022	28 February 2023
	Constantinos Kombos	1 March 2023	Incumbent

== See also ==
- Ministry of Foreign Affairs (Cyprus)
