= Minister of Construction and Public Works (Angola) =

Angola government cabinet ministry

Minister of Construction and Public Works of Angola is a cabinet level position in the national government. The position was established in 1975 with Manuel Resende de Oliveira.

== Name changes ==
- 1975–1980: Minister of Construction and Housing

== Ministers of Construction and Public Works ==
- 1975–1978: Manuel Resende de Oliveira
- 1978–1980: Horacio Pereira Brás da Silva
- 1980–1983: Manuel Alves dos Passos Barroso Mangueira
- 1983–1986: Jorge Henrique Varela de Melo Dias Flora
- 1986–1991: João Henriques Garcia Cabelo Branco
- 1992–1996: Mateus Morais de Brito Júnior
- 1996–1997: Pedro de Castro Van Dúnem
- 1998–2001: António Henriques da Silva
- 2001–2010: Francisco Higino Lopes Carneiro
- 2010: José dos Santos da Silva Ferreira
- 2010–2013: Fernando Alberto Soares da Fonseca
- 2013–2016: Waldemar Pires Alexandre
- 2016–2017: Artur Carlos Andrade Fortunato
- 2017–present: Manuel Tavares de Almeida
