= Michael Damianos =

Cypriot lawyer and politician

- Μιχάλης Δαμιανός

Minister of Energy, Commerce and Industry
- Incumbent
- Assumed office 8 December 2025
- President: Nikos Christodoulides
- Preceded by: George Papanastasiou

Minister of Health
- In office 10 January 2024 – 8 December 2025
- President: Nikos Christodoulides
- Preceded by: Popi Kanari
- Succeeded by: Neophytos Charalambides

Personal details
- Party: Democratic Party
- Education: University of Southampton; University of Cambridge
- Profession: Lawyer

Michael Damianos is a Cypriot lawyer and politician who has served as Minister of Energy, Commerce and Industry of the Republic of Cyprus since 8 December 2025. He previously served as Minister of Health from 10 January 2024 to December 2025.

== Education ==
Damianos holds a law degree from the University of Southampton and a master's degree in law from the University of Cambridge, specialising in international law.

== Legal career ==
Before returning to Cyprus, Damianos worked at international law firms in London on corporate, commercial and energy matters. In 2010, he founded his own law firm.

== Political career ==
Damianos served as a municipal councillor in Strovolos from 2011 to 2016. He became vice-president of the Democratic Party (DIKO) in 2018.

=== Minister of Health ===
Damianos took office as Minister of Health on 10 January 2024, following a cabinet reshuffle by President Nikos Christodoulides. He succeeded Popi Kanari.

He served until 8 December 2025, when Neophytos Charalambides succeeded him as Minister of Health.

=== Minister of Energy, Commerce and Industry ===
On 8 December 2025, Damianos took office as Minister of Energy, Commerce and Industry following a cabinet reshuffle, succeeding George Papanastasiou.
