= Higino Carneiro =

Angolan politician (born 1962)

Governor of Cuanza Sul
- In office 1999–2002
- Preceded by: Ramos da Cruz
- Succeeded by: Serafim do Prado

Minister of Public Works
- In office 2002–2012
- Preceded by: Castro Van-Dúnem Loy
- Succeeded by: Fernando da Fonseca

Governor of Cuando Cubango
- In office 2012–2016
- Preceded by: Eusébio de Brito Teixeira
- Succeeded by: Pedro Mutindi

Governor of Luanda
- In office 2016–2017
- Preceded by: Graciano Domingos
- Succeeded by: Adriano Mendes de Carvalho

Personal details
- Born: July 8, 1962 (age 63) Libolo, Cuanza Sul
- Party: Popular Movement for the Liberation of Angola

General Francisco Higino Lopes Carneiro (born July 8, 1962) is currently a member of parliament for the MPLA in Angola. He is, along with fellow "top generals" João Maria de Sousa, Hélder Vieira Dias, Roberto Leal Monteiro, and Kundi Paihama, one of the military leaders holding top ministerial posts for the Popular Movement for the Liberation of Angola, the political party that has ruled Angola since it gained its independence from Portugal in 1975.

== Political life ==
He was a key figure in the successful peace negotiations between the Angolan government and the National Union for the Total Independence of Angola (UNITA), including that of Alto Cauango in 1991, which allowed for the gradual pacification of the country.

Carneiro was included on the MPLA's national list in the September 2008 parliamentary election. The MPLA won an overwhelming majority in the National Assembly. Previously, he had been the vice-president of the National Assembly, governor of the provinces of Luanda, Cuando-Cubango and Kwanza Sul. He was also the Minister of Public Works for ten years, from 2002 to 2012.

In February 2019, Carneiro was indicted for financial crimes committed during his tenure as governor of Luanda. These include allegations of corruption, money laundering and breach of trust. Along with another lawmaker, Manuel Rabelais, he is the first former member of government to be prosecuted since Joao Lourenco became Angola’s president in 2017. The General Attorney's Office on 13 February 2020 prohibited Carneiro from leaving the country as long as investigations are ongoing.

Carneiro is also accused of having run a money-laundering scheme through a front company called Agro 88, owned by Swiss art dealer Yves Bouvier. It was reported by local media that Agro 88 was "a front company designed to suck Angola's money".

Political offices
Preceded by Francisco José Ramos da Cruz	Governor of Cuanza Sul; 1999–2002	Succeeded by Serafim Maria do Prado
Preceded by António Henriques da Silva	Minister of Construction and Public Works; 2002–2012	Succeeded by Fernando Lemos da Fonseca
Preceded by Eusébio de Brito Teixeira	Governor of Cuando Cubango; 2012–2016	Succeeded by Pedro Mutindi
Preceded by Graciano Francisco Domingos	Governor of Luanda; 2016–2017	Succeeded by Adriano Mendes de Carvalho
