= Ioannis Kasoulidis =

Cypriot politician

Ioannis Kasoulides
- Ιωάννης Κασουλίδης
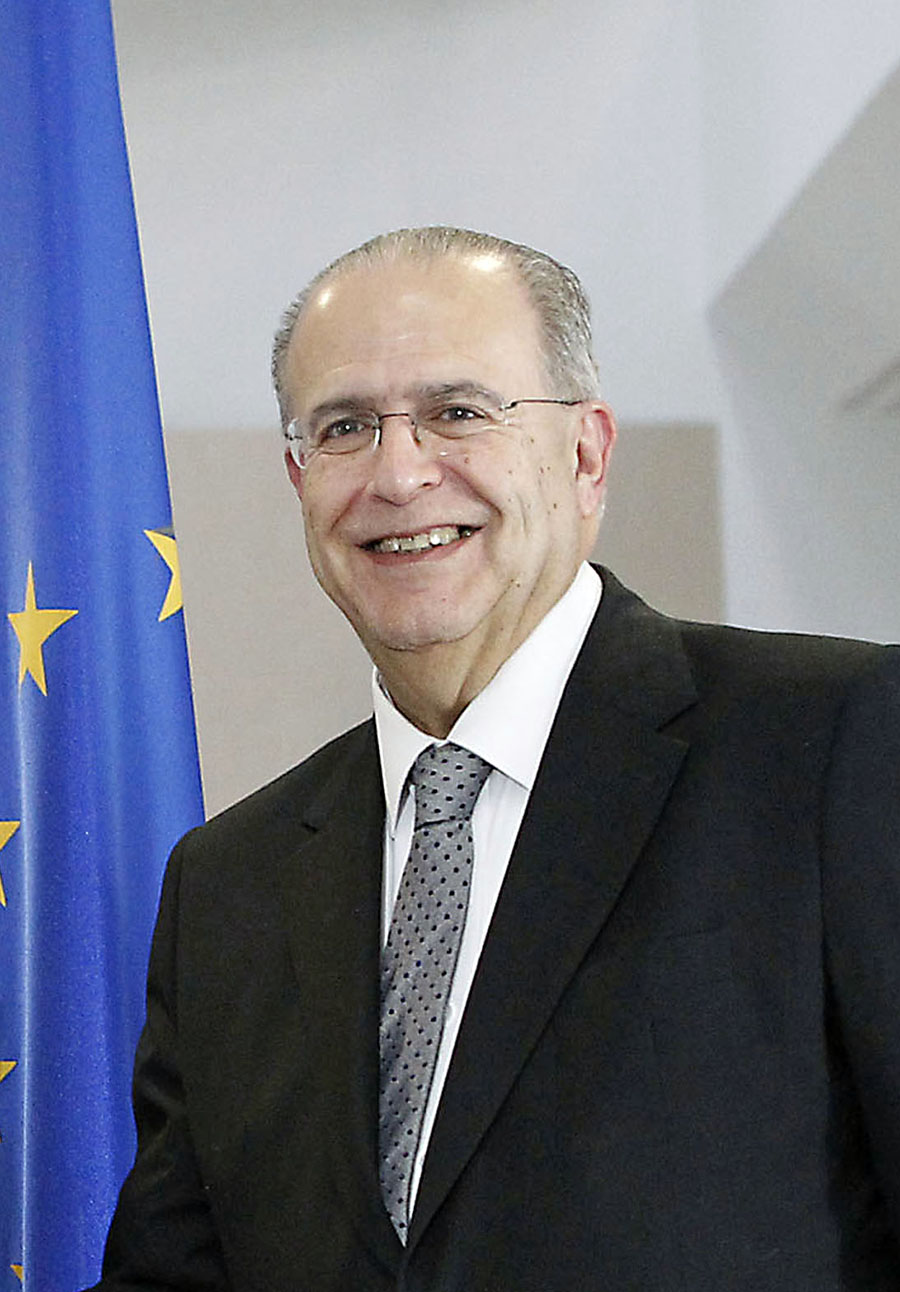

Minister of Foreign Affairs
- In office 11 January 2022 – 28 February 2023
- President: Nicos Anastasiades
- Preceded by: Nikos Christodoulides
- Succeeded by: Constantinos Kombos
- In office 28 February 2013 – 1 March 2018
- President: Nicos Anastasiades
- Preceded by: Erato Kozakou-Marcoullis
- Succeeded by: Nikos Christodoulides
- In office 9 April 1997 – 28 February 2003
- President: Glafcos Clerides
- Preceded by: Alekos Michaelides
- Succeeded by: Georgios Iacovou

Member of the European Parliament
- In office 2004–2013

Personal details
- Born: 10 August 1948 (age 78) Nicosia, Cyprus
- Party: Democratic Rally
- Education: University of Lyon

Ioannis Kasoulides (Greek: Ιωάννης Κασουλίδης; born 10 August 1948 in Nicosia, Cyprus) is a Cypriot politician, party member of DISY and Minister of Foreign Affairs of Cyprus. He has served in the same position from 1997 until 2003, and again from 2013 to 2018. He was member of the European Parliament from 2004 until 2013. He has held a number of political posts in Cyprus, including member of the House of Representatives of Cyprus from 1991 until 1993, and government spokesman from 1993 until 1997.

== Education and career ==
Kasoulides studied medicine at the University of Lyon, and founded and served as the chairman of the Federation of Cypriot Students Unions in France. He graduated in 1974 with MD. From 1975 until 1981, he was a hospital doctor and lecturer in London. He specialised in geriatrics in London, at the London Hospital, in 1981. From 1981 until 1993, he practised medicine in Nicosia.

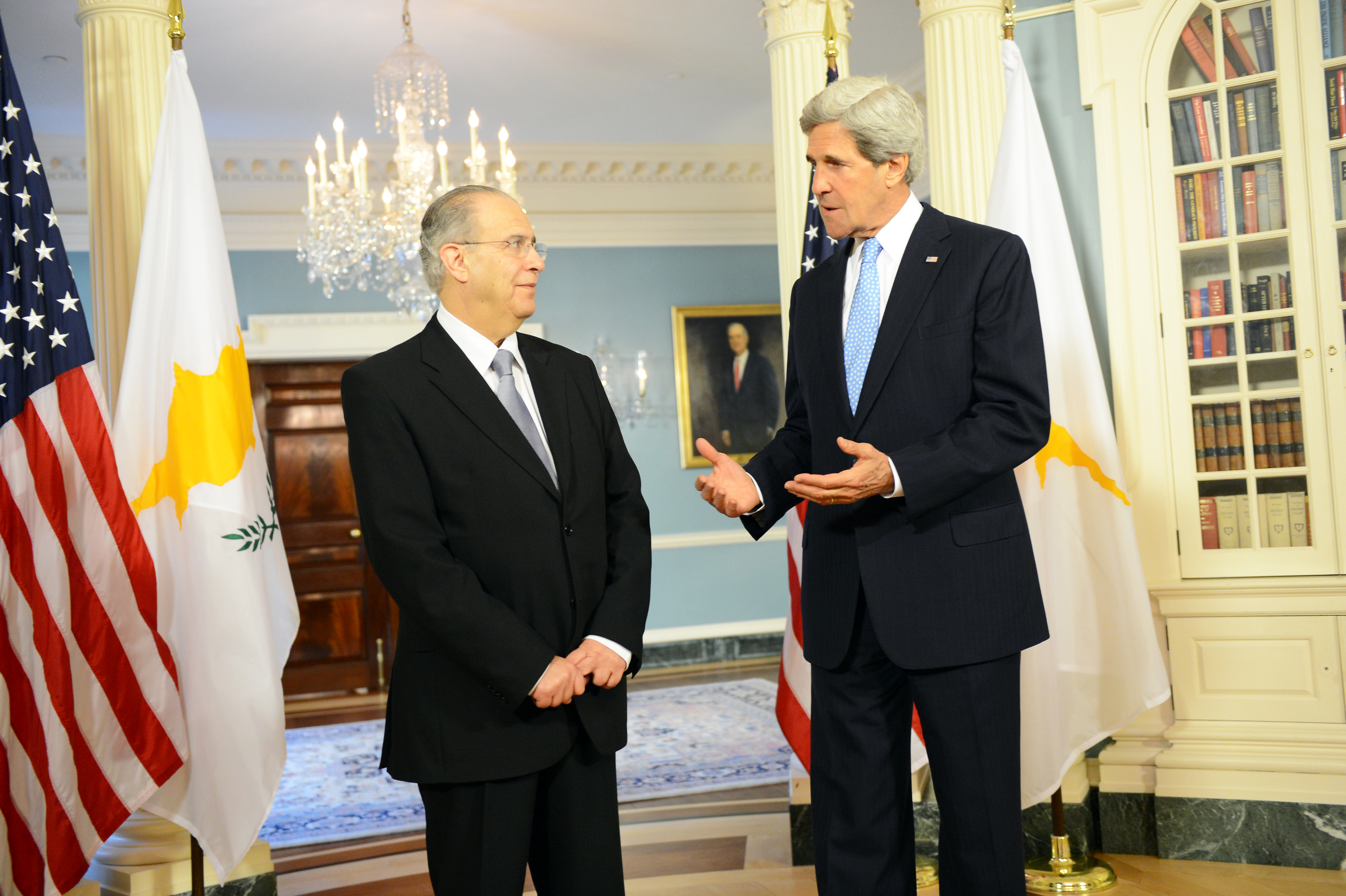
Kasoulides meets with United States Secretary of State John Kerry at the U.S. Department of State in Washington, D.C., on May 10, 2013.

Ioannis Kasoulides served the Democratic Rally in various roles, including that of Chair of the party's Youth Organization. In 1991, he was elected as a member of the House of Representatives of Cyprus and in March 1993 he was appointed by then President Glafkos Clerides as the Government Spokesman, a position he held until April 1997 when he was appointed Minister of Foreign Affairs. He remained Foreign Minister until the end of term of the Clerides administration in 2003. As Minister of Foreign Affairs, Kasoulides oversaw Cyprus' EU integration process.

He founded consulting firm "DDK Strategy and Public Affairs" in 2003.

In June 2004, Ioannis Kasoulides was elected to be a member of the European Parliament. He sat on the Foreign Affairs Committee and was as a substitute on the Transport and Tourism Committee. He held various other European Parliament committee positions, including the Presidency of the ad hoc Delegation for the Human Rights in Western Sahara. Ioannis Kasoulides sat as a Member of the Bureau of the European's People Party until November 2007, when he stood as candidate for the Presidency of Cyprus.

Ioannis Kasoulides ran for President in the Cypriot presidential election of 2008. He won the first round, but lost in the second to Demetris Christofias. Kasoulides received just under 47% of the vote.

In June 2009, Ioannis Kasoulides was re-elected Member of the European Parliament, achieving a new personal record regarding number of votes. He was elected Vice-Chairman of the Presidency of the EPP group in the European Parliament, where he was appointed as the head of the Foreign Affairs Working group.

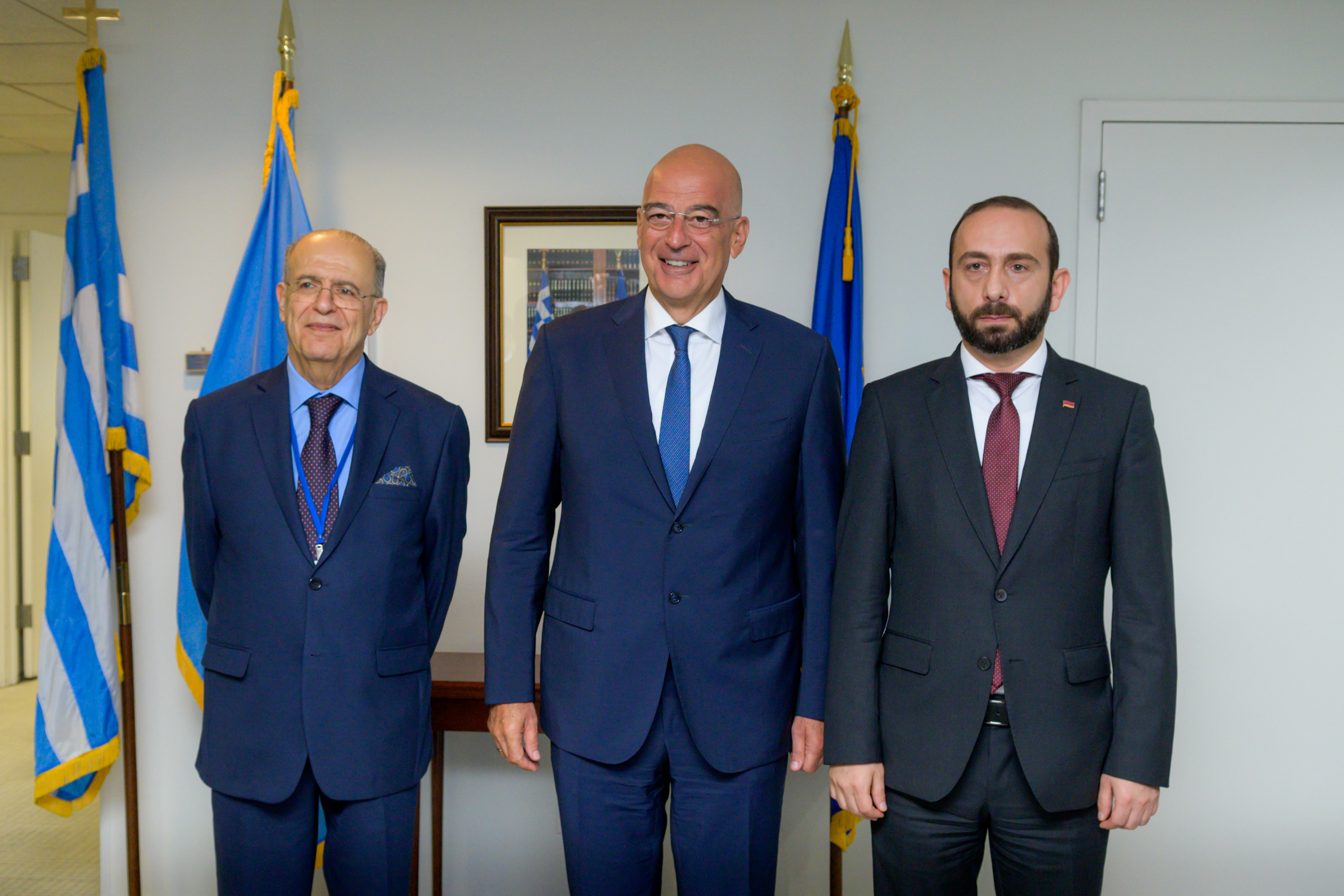
Kasoulidis with Greek Foreign Minister Nikos Dendias and Armenian Foreign Minister Ararat Mirzoyan on 19 September 2022

Ioannis Kasoulides has joined the EuroAsia Interconnector on March 30, 2018 as Chairman of the Strategic Council.

After the resignation of Nikos Christodoulides as Foreign Minister on January 9, 2022, Kasoulides was chosen again by President Anastasiades to be the Minister after 4 years of absence from active political life. He was sworn in on January 11.

== Personal life ==
Kasoulides was married to anaesthetist Emi Kasoulidou until her death in September 2026 from cancer; they have one daughter, Joanna. He is fluent in English and French. He co-authored the book Cyprus – EU: the Accession as I Witnessed It.

== Awards and decorations ==
Ioannis Kasoulides has been awarded with the following honours:

- Officer of the Order of the Legion of Honour.
- Commander of the Order of the Phoenix of the Hellenic Republic
- Commander of the Order of Merit of the Hellenic Republic
- Commander of the Order of Xirka of Malta
- Commander of the National Order of the Cedar of Lebanon
- Commander of the Order of the Knights of the Holy Sepulchre
- Palestinian Bethlehem 2000 Award
- Athens Municipality Highest Distinction Award

== See also ==
- List of foreign ministers in 2017
- List of current foreign ministers

Political offices
Preceded by Alekos Michaelides	Minister of Foreign Affairs; 1997–2003	Succeeded by Georgios Iacovou
Preceded by Erato Kozakou-Marcoullis	Minister of Foreign Affairs; 2013–2018	Succeeded by Nikos Christodoulides
Preceded by Nikos Christodoulides	Minister of Foreign Affairs; 2022–2023	Succeeded by Constantinos Kombos
