= Pedro Mutinde =

Angolan politician

Pedro Mutindi
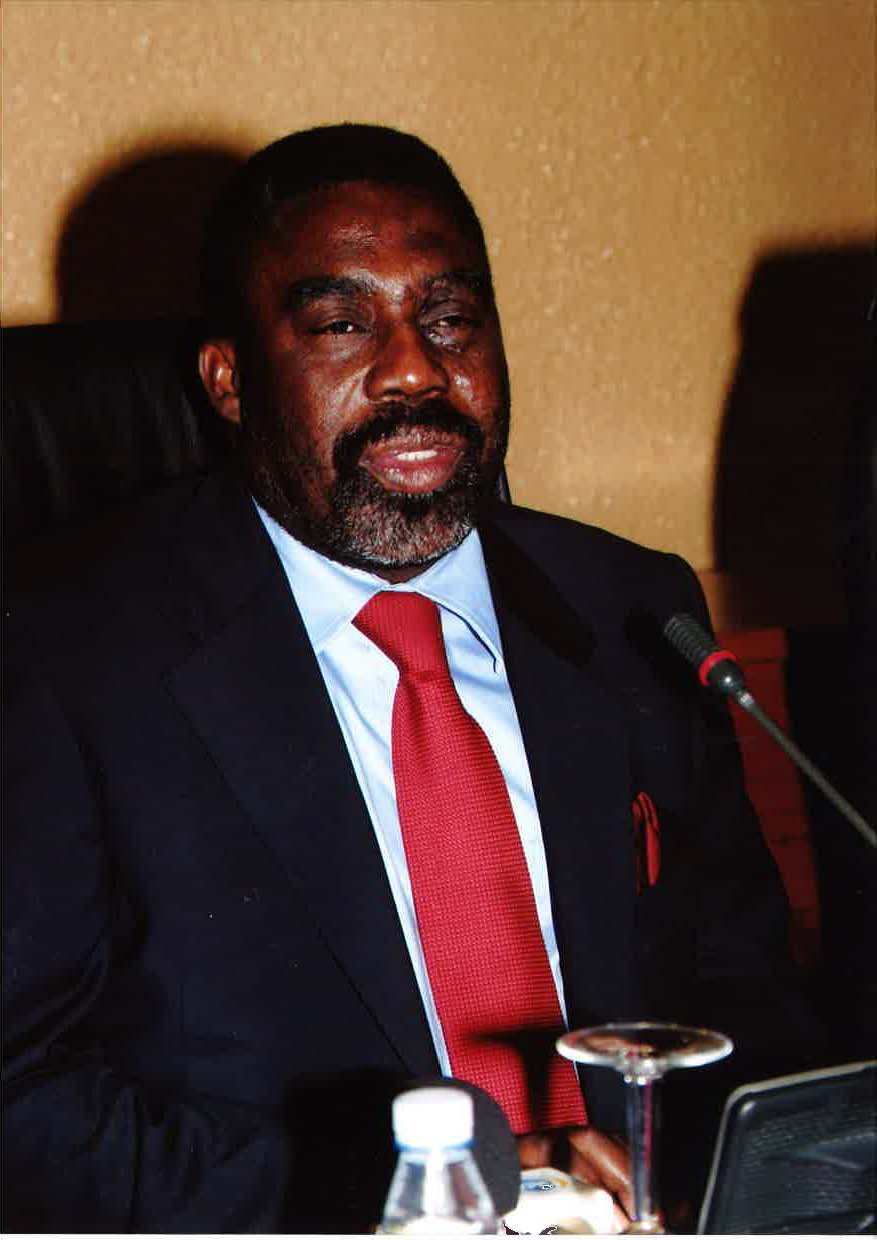

Governor of Cuando Cubango
- Incumbent
- Assumed office 2016
- Preceded by: Higino Carneiro

Commissioner/Governor of Cunene
- In office 1983–2008
- Preceded by: Major Ary da Costa
- Succeeded by: António Didalelwa

Minister of Hotel and Tourism
- In office 2010–2016
- Preceded by: Jorge Alicerces Valentim
- Succeeded by: Paulino Domingos Baptista

Personal details
- Born: June 30, 1954 (age 72) Mutano, Humbe, Cunene Province, Angola
- Party: MPLA
- Spouse: Maria da Natividade

Pedro Mutinde (born June 30, 1954) is an Angolan politician. He is the current Minister of Hotels and Tourism of Angola, as well as a member of parliament. He is a member of MPLA. Mutindi was born in Mutano, municipality of Ombadija, province of Cunene, in southern Angola.

In 1974, at the age of twenty-two, he began his political career in the cell of the Popular Movement for the Liberation of Angola (MPLA) in Humbe, of which he learned through the Angola Combatante program. For two years he lived as a refugee in Mucope due to the conflict with the National Union for the Total Independence of Angola (UNITA).

In 2018, Mutinde was appointed governor of the province of Cuando Cubango.

Political offices
Preceded by Major Ary da Costa	Commissioner/Governor of Cunene; 1983–2008	Succeeded by António Didalelwa
Preceded by Jorge Alicerces Valentim	Minister of Hotel and Tourism; 2010–2016	Succeeded by Paulino Domingos Baptista
Preceded by Higino Carneiro	Governor of Cuando Cubango; 2016–	Succeeded by
