= Afonso Van-Dúnem =

Angolan politician

Afonso Van-Dúnem "Mbinda"

Provincial Commissioner of Luanda
- In office 1977–1978
- Preceded by: Pedro F. Luís Manuel
- Succeeded by: A. Mendes de Carvalho

Foreign Minister of Angola
- In office 1985–1989
- Preceded by: José Eduardo dos Santos
- Succeeded by: P. Castro Van-Dúnem Loy

Ambassador of Angola to the UN
- In office 1991–1999
- Preceded by: Manuel Pedro Pacavira
- Succeeded by: José Patrício

Personal details
- Born: 7 September 1941 Luanda, Angola
- Died: 14 November 2014 (aged 73) Luanda, Angola
- Spouse: Luzia Inglês Van-Dúnem

Afonso Van-Dúnem aka M'Binda (7 September 1941 – 14 November 2014) was an Angolan politician. Van-Dúnem worked as the MPLA-Workers' Party representative in Zambia and Tanzania from 1970 to 1972, as well as being elected to the Central Committee of the MPLA from 1976 onwards. He was also Minister of External Relations from 1985 to 1989 and Permanent Representative to the United Nations from 1991 to 2000.

== Career ==
While Van-Dúnem was Minister of External Relations, he helped to negotiate the agreement that led to the Cuban withdrawal from Angola and the South African withdrawal from Namibia, paving the way for Namibia's independence.

== Personal life ==
Van-Dúnem married Luzia Inglês Van-Dúnem, an MPLA politician and women's rights activist; they had four children.

== See also ==
- List of foreign ministers in 1989
- Foreign relations of Angola

Political offices
Preceded by Pedro Fortunato Luís Manuel	Provincial Commissioner of Luanda; 1977-1978	Succeeded by Agostinho A. Mendes de Carvalho
Preceded by José Eduardo dos Santos	Foreign Minister of Angola; 1985–1989	Succeeded by Pedro de Castro Van-Dúnem
Preceded by Manuel Pedro Pacavira	Ambassador of Angola to the United Nations; 1991-1999	Succeeded by José Gonçalves Martins Patrício
