= Georgios Iacovou =

Cypriot diplomat and politician (born 1938)

- Γεώργιος Ιακώβου
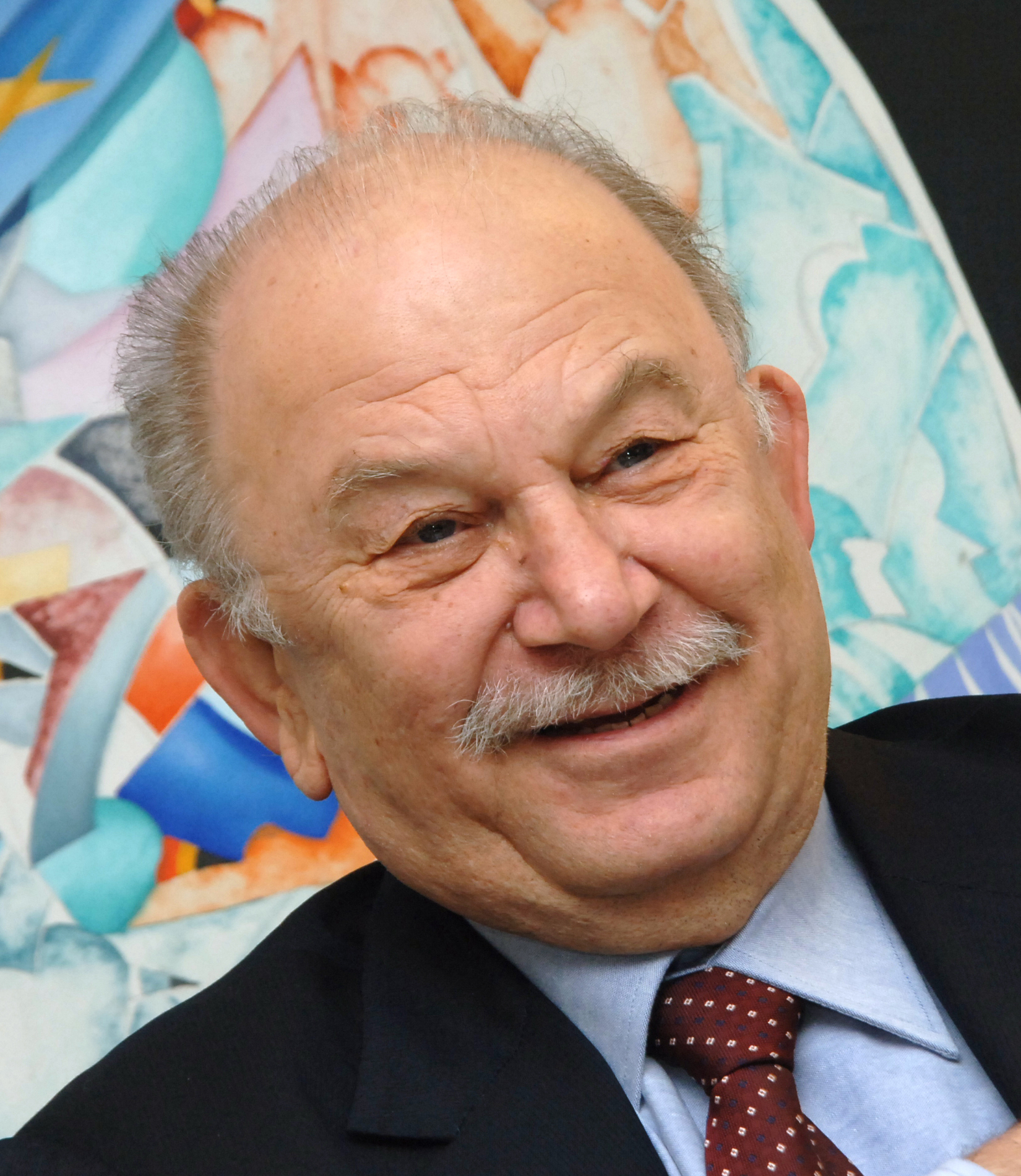
- Iacovou in 2006

Cypriot High Commissioner to the United Kingdom
- In office 20 October 2006 – 2007

Minister of Foreign Affairs
- In office 1 March 2003 – 12 June 2006
- President: Tassos Papadopoulos
- Preceded by: Ioannis Kasoulidis
- Succeeded by: Giorgos Lillikas
- In office 22 September 1983 – 28 February 1993
- President: Spyros Kyprianou; George Vassiliou
- Preceded by: Nicos A. Rolandis
- Succeeded by: Alekos Michaelides

Cypriot Ambassador to Germany
- In office January 1979 – January 1983

Personal details
- Born: 19 July 1938 (age 87) Peristeronopigi, Cyprus
- Profession: Diplomat, politician

Georgios Kyriakou Iacovou (born 19 July 1938) is a Cypriot diplomat and politician. Iacovou served as Foreign Minister of Cyprus for two consecutive terms from 1983 to 1993 and for a third term from 2003 to 2006, which makes him Cyprus's longest serving Foreign Minister. Between 2006 and 2007, he served as High Commissioner of Cyprus to the United Kingdom. He is also known for his work on the rehabilitation of Greek Cypriot refugees and on persons of Greek origin living in the former Soviet Union. Between 2008 and 2013, Iacovou was Minister of Presidency.

== Early life ==
Iacovou was born in the village of Peristeronopigi, in Famagusta District. He graduated from the Famagusta Gymnasium. From 1955 to 1960, Iacovou was a student in the United Kingdom and was active in student politics and Greek Cypriot community affairs.

== Career ==
From 1960 until 1964, Iacovou worked in the private sector in Cyprus. He worked as a Senior Consultant at the international enterprise Price Waterhouse in London, as Principal Officer for Operational Research and later on as Senior Finance Officer of the board of directors for British Rail. In 1972, he returned to Cyprus from the United Kingdom, and was appointed Director of the Cyprus Productivity Centre, where he introduced new management methods in industry and commerce, pioneering programmes for continuing education of business executives, such as a post-graduate management course that has been running for over thirty years. He also turned his attention to the upgrading of skills of artisans and technicians in many fields. Concurrently, Iacovou was Chairman of the board of directors of the Hotel and Catering Institute of Cyprus ("HCI"), and under his stewardship, the HCI became internationally known, being acknowledged accordingly on the island.

== Political career ==
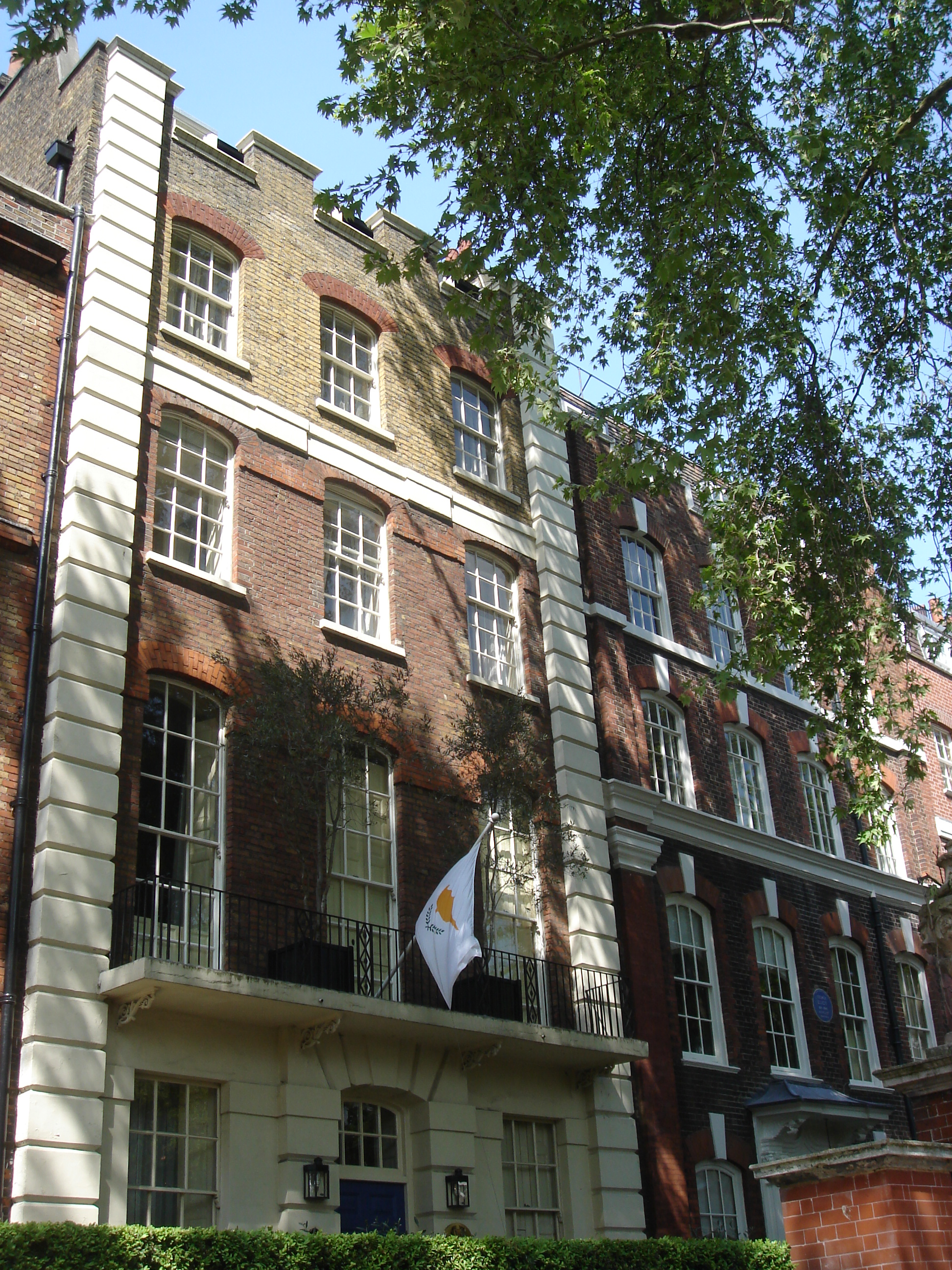
Residence of Cyprus High Commissioner in London, 5 Cheyne Walk

Following the Turkish invasion of 1974, he established and directed the "Service for the Relief and Rehabilitation of Displaced Persons" on directions from the Council of Ministers of the Republic of Cyprus. He later also established the "Service for the Reintegration of Displaced Persons". Iacovou's work for refugees has had an important impact on subsequent developments in Cyprus, including what has been dubbed the Cypriot "economic miracle". In this capacity, Iacovou became a close associate of Archbishop Makarios, the first President of the Republic of Cyprus. He also became one of the most articulate advocates of the rights of displaced persons in Cyprus, who form a core issue of the wider Cyprus problem. His work in the field has been nationally and internationally acknowledged, with his exposure to these people's problems influencing his subsequent career. Iacovou is considered one of the ablest administrators of Cyprus and is often referred to as the technocrat with the big heart. From April 1976 until January 1979, he served as Head of the Africa Department of the UN High Commission for Refugees in Geneva.

From January 1979 until January 1983, he was Ambassador of the Cyprus Republic to the Federal Republic of Germany, with parallel accreditation to Austria and Switzerland; later on, he served as Permanent Secretary in the Ministry of Foreign Affairs.

On 22 September 1983, he was appointed Foreign Minister and remained in this post until February 1993. His first appointment to this office came just before the illegal and unilateral declaration of "independence" by the Turkish Cypriot leadership in 1983. Nevertheless, he successfully pursued the condemnation of this action in the United Nations Security Council through the adoption of SC Resolutions 541 and 550. As Minister of Foreign Affairs, he negotiated Cyprus's Customs Union Agreement with the then European Economic Community (EEC) in 1987, and in 1990, he submitted the application of Cyprus to join the EEC. In 2003, Iacovou signed the Treaty of Accession of Cyprus to the European Union ("EU").

Later on, he was appointed by the Greek government as President of the National Foundation for the Reception and Resettlement of Repatriated Greeks. His programme for the integration of several hundred thousand persons of Greek origin returning to Greece from the former Soviet Union was met with great success. Iacovou masterminded operation Golden Fleece, the liberation of fifteen hundred men, women and children of Greek origin from the besieged city of Sukhumi in Abkhazia; he later participated in a similar operation in the city of Groznyy, Chechnya. He also founded several university departments for the teaching of the Greek language in countries of the former Soviet Union.

== Presidential election ==
Following his return to Cyprus in 1997, he ran for office in the February 1998 presidential election as an independent candidate supported by the political parties AKEL and DIKO. He lost, by a narrow margin, to the incumbent President of the Republic, Glafcos Clerides. On 1 March 2003, he was appointed Foreign Minister in the new government of President Tassos Papadopoulos, serving until June 2006. In October that year, he was appointed as High Commissioner to the United Kingdom.

== Awards and affiliations ==
Iacovou has been awarded several honours, distinctions and medals from numerous countries, universities and organisations, amongst which are:

- The Grand Cross of Merit, Federal Republic of Germany
- The Grand Cross of the Order of Phoenix, Hellenic Republic
- The Grand Decoration of Honour in Gold with Sash for Services to the Republic of Austria (1983)
- The Grand Cross of the Order of Isavel La Catolica, Kingdom of Spain
- The Grand Cross of the Order of Honour, Hellenic Republic
- The Grand Cross of the Order of Infante D. Henrique, Republic of Portugal
- The Decoration of the Battalion of the Yugoslav Flag
- The Decoration of the Arab Republic of Egypt
- The Decoration of the Cross of St. Mark of the 1st order of the Patriarchate of Alexandria and all Africa
- Decoration of St. Catherine's Monastery of Sinai
- Honorary Doctorate of the Athens Panteion University, of Political and Social Sciences

Preceded by Nicos A. Rolandis	Foreign Minister of Cyprus; 1983–1993	Succeeded by Alekos Michaelides
Preceded by Ioannis Kasoulidis	Foreign Minister of Cyprus; 2003–2006	Succeeded by Yiorgos Lillikas
