= Elísio de Figueiredo =

Angolan politician

Ambassador of Angola to the UN
- Succeeded by: Manuel Pedro Pacavira

Ambassador of Angola to the UK
- In office 1988–1989
- Succeeded by: Luís Neto Kiambata

Ambassador of Angola to France
- In office 1989–1992
- Preceded by: Luís José de Almeida
- Succeeded by: Boaventura Cardoso

Ambassador of Angola to Singapore and Indonesia
- In office 2002–2006
- Preceded by: Position established
- Succeeded by: Flávio S.C. Fonseca

Personal details
- Party: MPLA

Elísio de Figueiredo served as the first ambassador of Angola to the United Nations from 1976 to 1988 as well as the Minister of Industry.

On 16 March 1979, de Figueiredo, in his letter to the United Nations, requested an urgent meeting of the United Nations Security Council on the question of South Africa's continuous acts of aggression in Angola.
