= Manuel Pedro Pacavira =

Angolan politician (1939–2016)

Minister of Agriculture
- In office 1976–1981
- President: Agostinho Neto
- Preceded by: Position established
- Succeeded by: Artur Vidal Gomes

Ambassador of Angola to Cuba
- In office 1985–1988
- Preceded by: Mawete João Baptista
- Succeeded by: Luís Doukui de Castro

Ambassador of Angola to the UN
- In office 1988–1991
- Preceded by: Elísio de Figueiredo
- Succeeded by: Afonso Van-Dunem Mbinda

Governor of Cuanza Norte
- In office 1991–2004
- Preceded by: Francisco Vieira Dias
- Succeeded by: Henrique André Júnior

Ambassador of Angola to Italy
- In office 2005–2011
- Preceded by: Pedro Sebastião
- Succeeded by: Florêncio Mariano de Almeida

Personal details
- Born: 14 October 1939 Golungo Alto, Cuanza Norte, Angola
- Died: 12 September 2016 (aged 76) Lisbon, Portugal
- Party: MPLA

Manuel Pedro Pacavira (14 October 1939 – 12 September 2016) was an Angolan writer and diplomat who served as the ambassador of Angola to Italy, the United Nations Food and Agriculture Organization (FAO), the International Fund for Agricultural Development (IFAD) and the World Food Programme. He previously served as Transportation Minister. He succeeded Elísio de Figueiredo as ambassador to the United Nations in 1988, serving until 1991.

Pacavira, born in Cuanza Norte, Angola, studied in Havana, Cuba. He published a book on President Jose Eduardo Dos Santos, Jose Eduardo dos Santos - A Life Devoted to the Homeland, in August 2006. Pacavira died on 12 September 2016, at the age of 76.

== See also ==
- Angolan Civil War
