= Ioannis Christophides =

Cypriot politician

Minister of Foreign Affairs (Cyprus)
- In office 16 June 1972 – 8 Μarch 1978
- President: Makarios III
- Preceded by: Spyros Kyprianou
- Succeeded by: Nicos A. Rolandis

Personal details
- Born: 21 January 1924 Nicosia Municipality
- Died: 9 December 2001 (aged 77)
- Citizenship: Cyprus
- Spouse: Marvel Christophide
- Children: 2 daughters
- Education: Jurisprudence
- Occupation: Lawyer

Ioannis Christophides (Greek: Ιωάννης Χριστοφίδης; 21 January 1924 – 9 December 2001) was a Cypriot politician who served as the Minister of Foreign Affairs of Cyprus from June 1972 to March 1978.
