= Manuel Tavares de Almeida =

Angolan politician

- Born: Angola
- Occupation: Politician

Manuel Tavares de Almeida is an Angolan politician. He is the current Minister of Construction and Public Works of Angola, as well as a member of parliament. He is the member of MPLA.
