= Giorgos Lillikas =

Cypriot politician (born 1960)

- Γιώργος Λιλλήκας
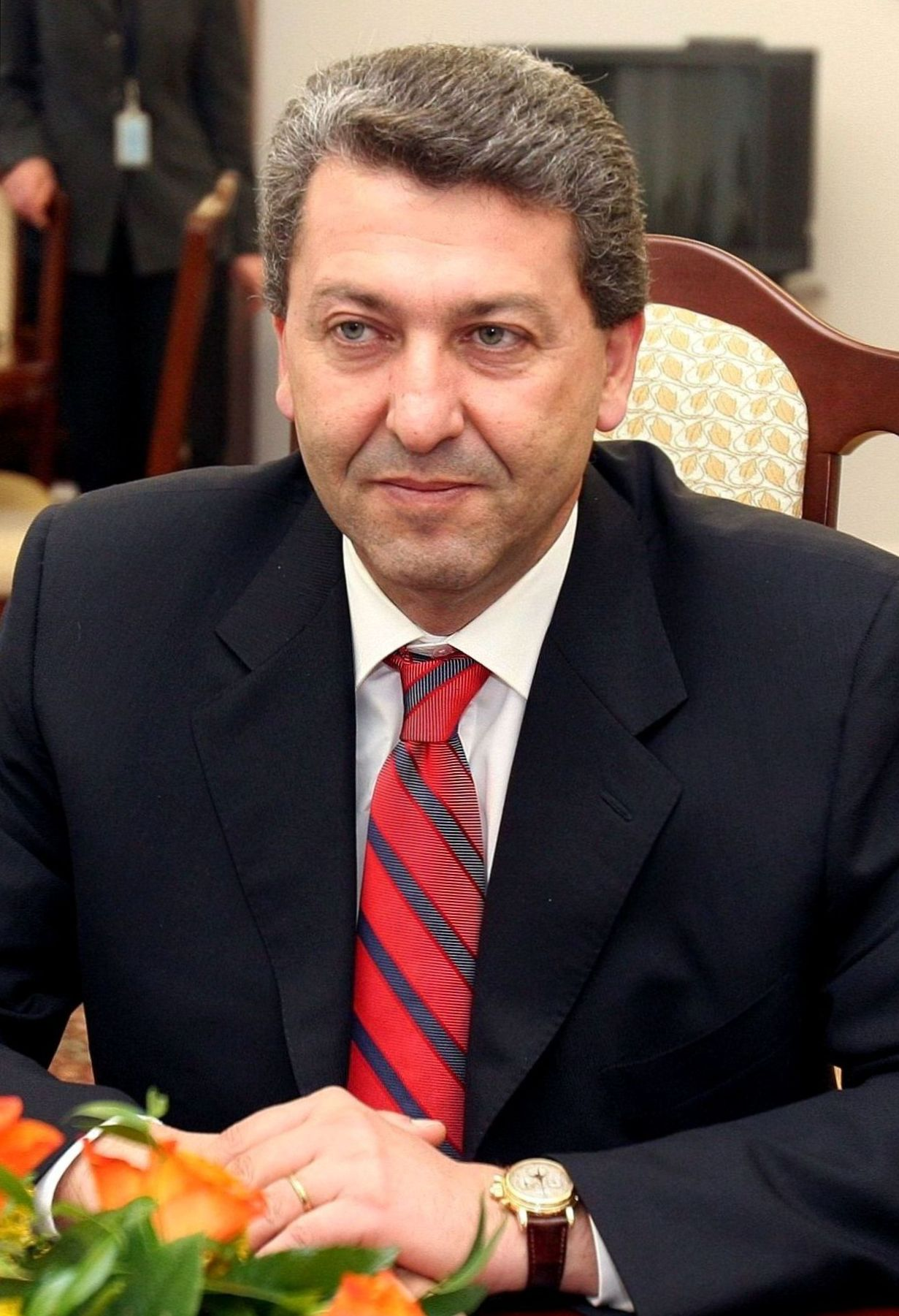

Minister of Foreign Affairs
- In office 13 June 2006 – 16 July 2007
- President: Tassos Papadopoulos
- Preceded by: Georgios Iacovou
- Succeeded by: Erato Kozakou-Marcoullis

Personal details
- Born: 1 June 1960 (age 65) Panayia, Cyprus
- Party: Citizens' Alliance
- Profession: Politician
- Website: www.yiorgoslillikas.com

Giorgos Lillikas (Greek: Γιώργος Λιλλήκας; born 1 June 1960) is a Cypriot politician. Following the election of Tassos Papadopoulos as president in 2003, Lillikas became minister of commerce and industry. He was subsequently the foreign minister from 2006 to 2007. He was an independent candidate at the 2013 Cypriot presidential election.

== Studies ==
He studied political science at the Institute of Political Science in Lyon, France, majoring in information and communications. He also holds a diploma in special studies on the Arab world from the Middle East Research Centre and the Institute of Political Science in Lyon. He continued his studies at the Institute of Political Science in Grenoble and was awarded a master's degree in political science.

During his studies in France he was actively involved in the student movement. Between 1985 and 1987 he was member of the Historic Politology Research Team of the National Scientific Research Centre of France. From 1988 until 1990 he served as special advisor to the president of the Republic of Cyprus George Vasiliou. He then served for three years as the general secretary of the secretariat for the New Generation. During those years, he has been very active in associations and organizations involved in the anti-drugs movement and in the social integration of children with special needs.

Also, he represented Cyprus in many international conferences and gave many lectures in Cyprus and abroad on the Cyprus problem and the problems of youth. He published many articles and studies, both in the Cypriot and the international press. From 1993 to 1996 he was Managing Director of a public relations, strategic marketing, and advertising company.

== Political career ==
In 1996, he was elected Member of the House of Representatives as a candidate of the left-wing party AKEL in the Nicosia electoral district and was re-elected in the parliamentary elections of 2001. He served on the Parliamentary Committees on Finance, Foreign and European Affairs, Education, and Trade and chaired the Parliamentary Committee on the Environment. He was head of the Cyprus Parliamentarian Delegation to the Parliamentary Assembly of the Organization for Security and Co-operation in Europe (OSCE), and was elected vice president of its Committee of Political Affairs and Security for the period 2001–2002.

Lillikas served as minister of commerce, industry, and tourism from March 2003 until his appointment as minister of foreign affairs on June 13, 2006. He has also served as acting government spokesman between January and June 2006.

== Personal life ==
He was married to Barbara Petropoulou until their divorce in 2018. They have one son together, Orpheas.

Preceded by Georgios Iacovou	Foreign Minister of Cyprus; 2006–2007	Succeeded by Erato Kozakou-Marcoullis
