= Erato Kozakou-Marcoullis =

Cypriot politician

- Ερατώ Κοζάκου-Μαρκουλλή
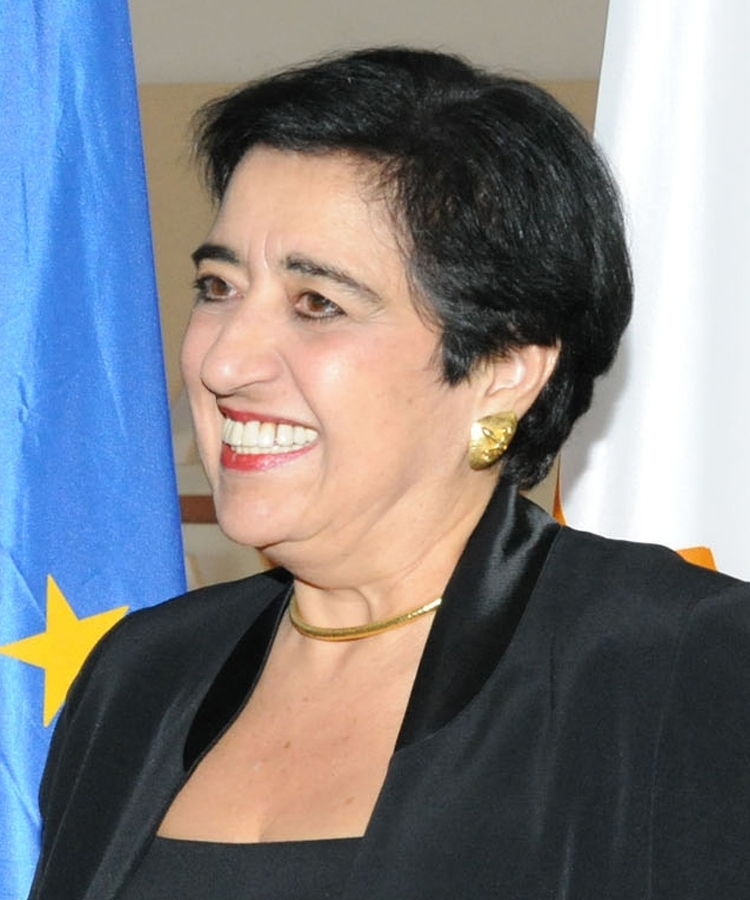
- Kozakou-Marcoullis in 2011
- Born: Erato Kozakou; 3 August 1949 (age 76); Limassol, Cyprus
- Education: University of Athens; University of Helsinki
- Occupation: Politician
- Known for: Minister of Foreign Affairs of Cyprus, 2007-2008, 2011-13; Minister of Communications and Works of Cyprus, 2010-2011
- Board member of: RCB Bank; Cyprus Institute; Institute for Cultural Diplomacy
- Spouse: George Marcoullis
- Children: 1

Erato Kozakou-Marcoullis (Greek: Ερατώ Κοζάκου-Μαρκουλλή; born 3 August 1949) is a Cypriot politician who served as the Minister of Foreign Affairs of Cyprus from July 2007 to March 2008 and from 5 August 2011 - 27 February 2013, as well as Minister of Communications and Works (Cyprus) from March 2010 to August 2011.

== Early life ==
Marcoullis was born in Limassol in 1949. She studied law and public law/political science at the University of Athens, graduating in 1972 and 1974, respectively. She obtained a PhD in sociology and political science from the University of Helsinki in 1979.

== Career ==
From 1980 to 2007, she served as a diplomat in the Diplomatic Service of the Foreign Affairs Ministry of the Republic of Cyprus. Specifically, she served as Ambassador of Cyprus to the United States (1998-2003) with parallel accreditation to the World Bank, the International Monetary Fund, Canada, Brazil, Jamaica, Guyana, the International Civil Aviation Organization and the Organization of American States, as Ambassador to Sweden (1996–98), with parallel accreditation in Finland, Norway, Denmark, Iceland, Lithuania, Latvia and Estonia, as well as Ambassador to Lebanon and Jordan (2005–07).

Marcoullis served as Minister of Foreign Affairs from July 2007 until March 2008. Then she became Minister of Communications and Works in March 2010 and her tenure lasted until August 2011, when she was appointed for the second time Minister of Foreign Affairs. She was succeeded by Ioannis Kasoulidis on 1 March 2013.

Dr. Erato Kozakou-Marcoullis serves as Vice President of the Advisory Board of the Institute for Cultural Diplomacy (ICD).

== Personal life ==
She is married to George Marcoullis, and they have one son, Panos Marcoullis.

Preceded by Giorgos Lillikas	Foreign Minister of Cyprus; 2007–2008	Succeeded by Markos Kyprianou
Preceded by Markos Kyprianou	Foreign Minister of Cyprus; 2011–2013	Succeeded by Ioannis Kasoulidis
