= Nikos Christodoulides =

President of Cyprus since 2023

His Excellency Nikos Christodoulides
- Νίκος Χριστοδουλίδης
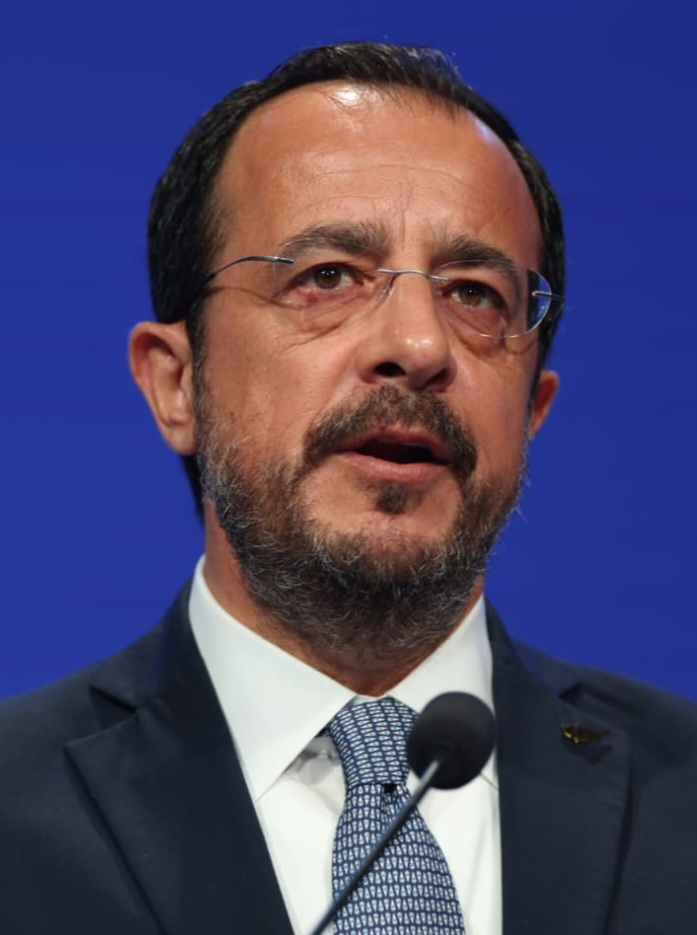
- Christodoulides in 2025

8th President of Cyprus
- Incumbent
- Assumed office 28 February 2023
- Preceded by: Nicos Anastasiades

Minister of Foreign Affairs
- In office 1 March 2018 – 11 January 2022
- President: Nicos Anastasiades
- Preceded by: Ioannis Kasoulidis
- Succeeded by: Ioannis Kasoulidis

Spokesperson of the Government
- In office 14 April 2014 – 28 February 2018
- Preceded by: Christos Stylianides
- Succeeded by: Prodromos Prodromou

Personal details
- Born: 6 December 1973 (age 52) Geroskipou, Paphos District, Cyprus
- Party: Democratic Rally (until 2023); Independent (2023–present)
- Spouse: Philippa Karsera (m. 2001)
- Children: 4
- Education: Queens College, CUNY; New York University; University of Malta; University of Athens
- Occupation: Politician; diplomat; academic
- Awards: Order of Makarios III (Grand Master); Order of Merit of the Republic of Cyprus
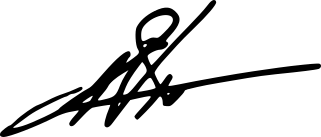
- Signature
- Nikos Christodoulides' voice On his meeting with Michel Barnier; Recorded February 2019

Nikos Christodoulides (Greek: Νίκος Χριστοδουλίδης; born 6 December 1973) is a Cypriot politician, diplomat, and academic who has served as the 8th President of Cyprus since 2023. He previously served as Government Spokesman from 2014 to 2018 and Minister of Foreign Affairs from 2018 to 2022, both under his predecessor Nicos Anastasiades. A former member of the Democratic Rally, he has been an independent since the party ejected him for entering the 2023 presidential race against their chosen candidate.

Christodoulides started his career as a diplomat in 1999, also working as a lecturer and researcher at the University of Cyprus from 2007 to 2010. He then served in the second Anastasiades government until resigning in January 2022 in order to run in the presidential election, where he defeated Andreas Mavroyiannis in the run-off and assumed office on 28 February 2023. He is the first Cypriot leader to be born in Cyprus after it gained independence from Britain. His tenure has been characterised by, domestically, a tougher stance on immigration and, internationally, closer relations with Israel and Egypt, as well as less engagement with Turkey.

== Early life ==
Nikos Christodoulides was born in Geroskipou on 6 December 1973, the son of a mother from Geroskipou and a father from Choulou. He graduated from the Lyceum A' of Ethnarch Makarios III in Paphos in 1991, and completed his compulsory two-year military service in the Cypriot National Guard in 1993. He majored in political science, economics, and Byzantine and Modern Greek studies at Queens College in New York City, graduating in 1997. He then pursued postgraduate studies in political science at New York University and diplomatic studies at the University of Malta's Mediterranean Academy of Diplomatic Studies. He earned a PhD in political science and public administration from the University of Athens in 2003.

== Pre-presidency work ==
=== Academia ===
Christodoulides lectured and worked as a non-tenure track research associate at the University of Cyprus' History and Archeology Department, teaching the history of the post-war world.

=== Diplomacy ===
Christodoulides entered diplomatic service in 1999. He held various posts, including Director of the Office of the Minister of Foreign Affairs, Spokesman of the Cyprus Presidency to the Council of the European Union in Brussels, Deputy Chief of Mission at the Embassy of Cyprus to Greece, Director of the Office of the Permanent Secretary of the Ministry of Foreign Affairs, and Consul-General of the High Commission of the Republic of Cyprus to the United Kingdom. Between 2013 and 2018, he served as Director of the Diplomatic Office of the President of Cyprus.

=== Government Spokesman ===
Christodoulides was appointed Government Spokesman on 14 April 2014, and stepped down upon the conclusion of Nicos Anastasiades' first term on 28 February 2018.

=== Minister of Foreign Affairs ===
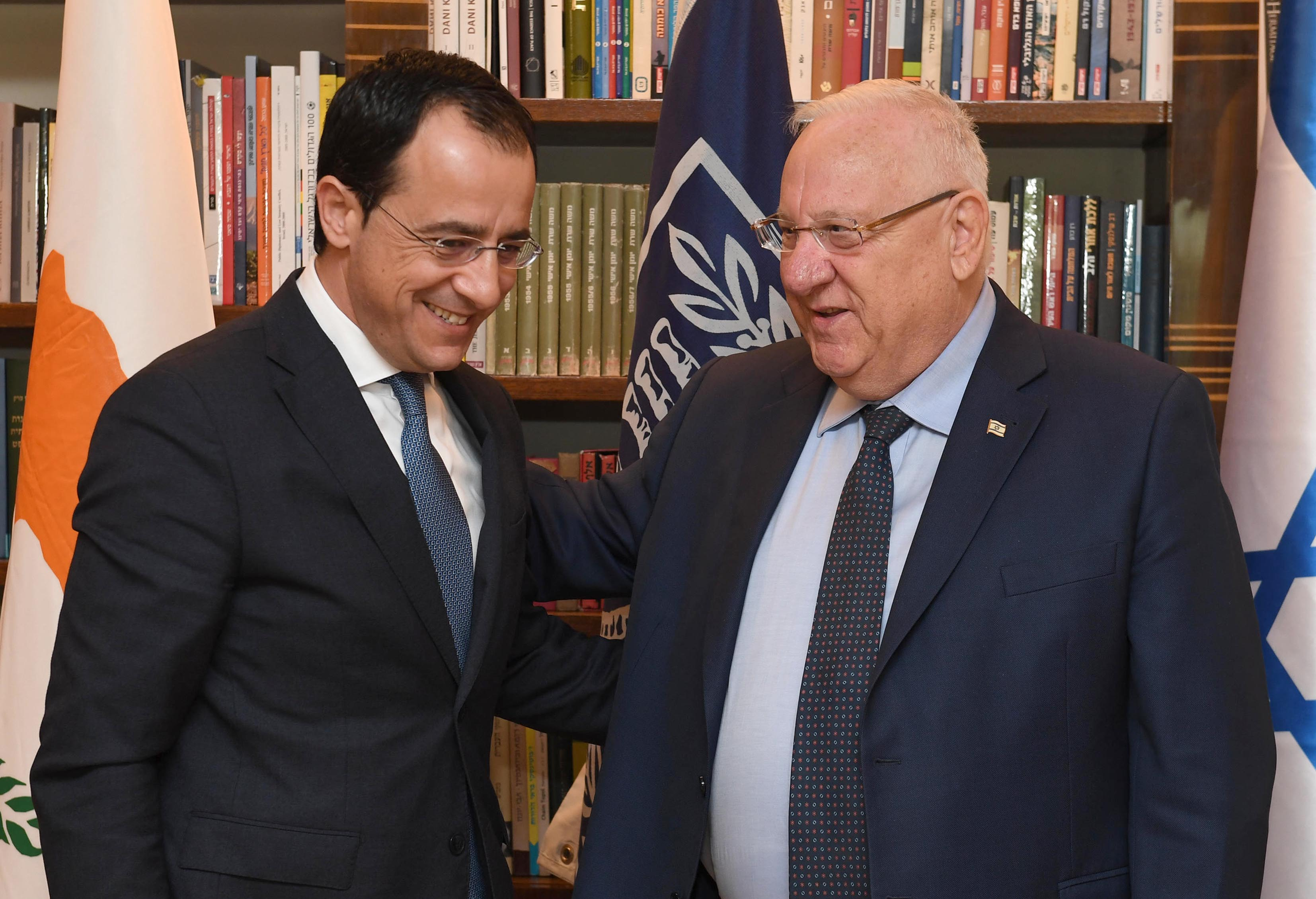
Christodoulides with Israeli president Reuven Rivlin in March 2018

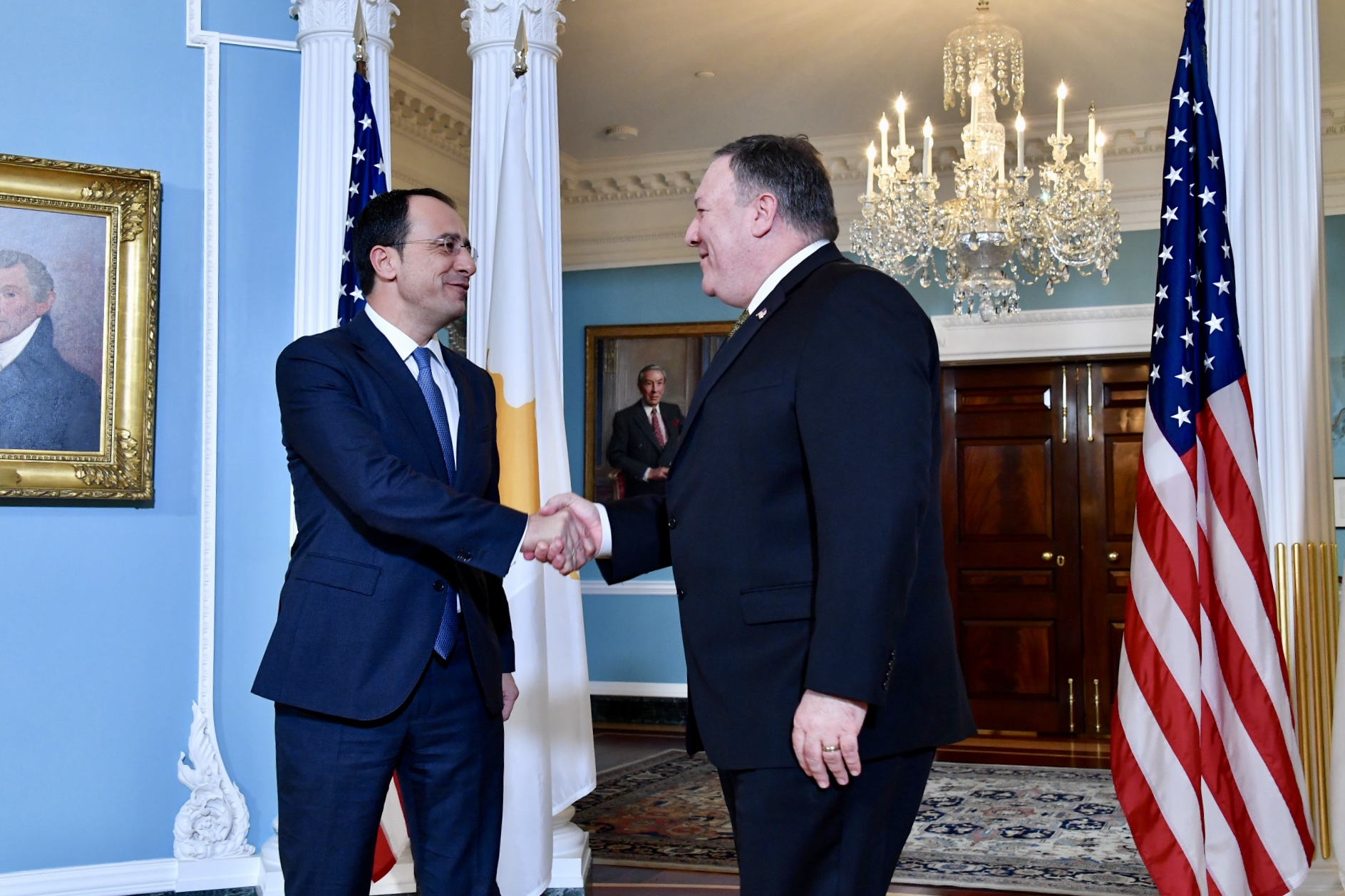
Christodoulides with U.S. Secretary of State Mike Pompeo in November 2018

On 1 March 2018, after Anastasiades' re-election, Christodoulides was appointed to Anastasiades' cabinet as Minister of Foreign Affairs. On 6 March 2018, he stated that Nicosia would not be swayed by Turkey's incursions into the Exclusive Economic Zone of Cyprus. During a meeting on Greek-Cypriot cooperation with Greek prime minister Alexis Tsipras, he said that the reunification of Cyprus was their primary goal.

In May 2018, Christodoulides officially asked the United Nations to prepare for a speedy resumption of the reunification process. After meeting Greek Foreign Minister Nikos Kotzias on 7 May 2018, he praised United Nations Secretary-General António Guterres for despatching a UN Special Representative to sound out the atmosphere for resuming talks.

In June 2018, Christodoulides visited Israel and met with prime minister Benjamin Netanyahu and president Reuven Rivlin. They discussed regional developments and the strengthening of bilateral ties in energy and emergency situations. They also discussed Turkish incursions and strategic cooperation on the planned EastMed pipeline. In June 2018, Christodoulides welcomed an announcement by ExxonMobil executives to speed up their schedule to begin drilling operations in Block 10 of the Exclusive Economic Zone. Operations were planned to begin in the fourth quarter of 2018 but did not begin until 2021.

On 17 July 2018, Christodoulides met EU High Representative Federica Mogherini in Brussels. They discussed the potential role of the EU in resuming stalled peace talks with Turkey. During his visit, he stated that Cyprus does "not have the luxury of a new talks' failure" and that "Turkey has to comply with European standards and international law".

On 15 July 2020, Christodoulides commented on the 2020 Armenian–Azerbaijani clashes, condemning the "ceasefire violation by Azerbaijan" and calling for "restraint of the parties to de-escalate the tension in the region".

Christodoulides was made a Knight of the Holy Sepulchre in 2018 and was awarded the Order of the Serbian Flag on 5 April 2021 by president Aleksandar Vučić.

== 2023 presidential election ==
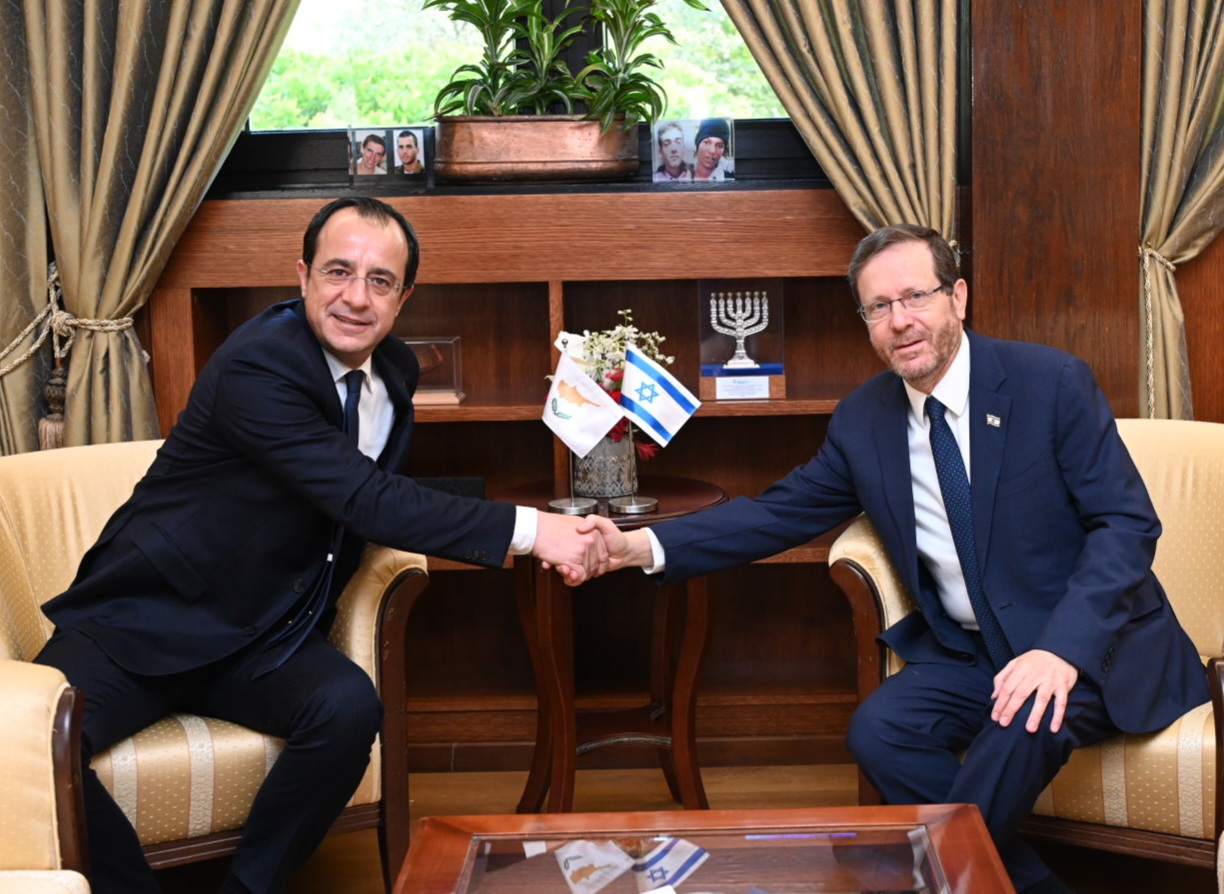
Christodoulides with Israeli president Isaac Herzog in May 2023

After months of speculation on whether he would run for president in the 2023 election, Christodoulides expressed his interest at a press conference held at the Ministry of Foreign Affairs on 9 January. The next day, he resigned as Minister and was replaced by Ioannis Kasoulides soon after.

In June 2022, Christodoulides formally announced his candidacy as an independent candidate despite being a member of the Democratic Rally, which fielded Averof Neofytou as its presidential nominee. On 5 January 2023, following the official filing of his candidacy, he was formally ejected from the party. He gathered support from smaller parties, including the Democratic Party, the Movement for Social Democracy, and the Democratic Alignment, while also managing to sway a large portion of his former party's supporters.

Christodoulides won the first round of the election with 32.04% of the vote, and was thereafter backed by incumbent president Anastasiades. After winning the second round with 51.92% of the vote (against the 48.08% of fellow independent candidate Andreas Mavroyiannis, who was backed by the Progressive Party of Working People) Christodoulides was declared the winner and became president-elect.

== Presidency ==
=== Cyprus problem ===
Christodoulides was inaugurated as president on 28 February 2023. He declared that his primary focus was finding a solution to the Cyprus problem. In order to restart the negotiations between the two sides, he requested the appointment of a UN special envoy. His proposal was accepted by António Guterres, who appointed Colombian diplomat María Ángela Holguín Cuéllar with the aim of facilitating the diplomatic process. Cuéllar arrived in Cyprus in January 2024, having already met with Colin Stewart (Cyprus' permanent UN representative in New York) and is planning visits to the guarantor power countries Greece, Turkey, and the United Kingdom.

=== Amalthea Initiative ===
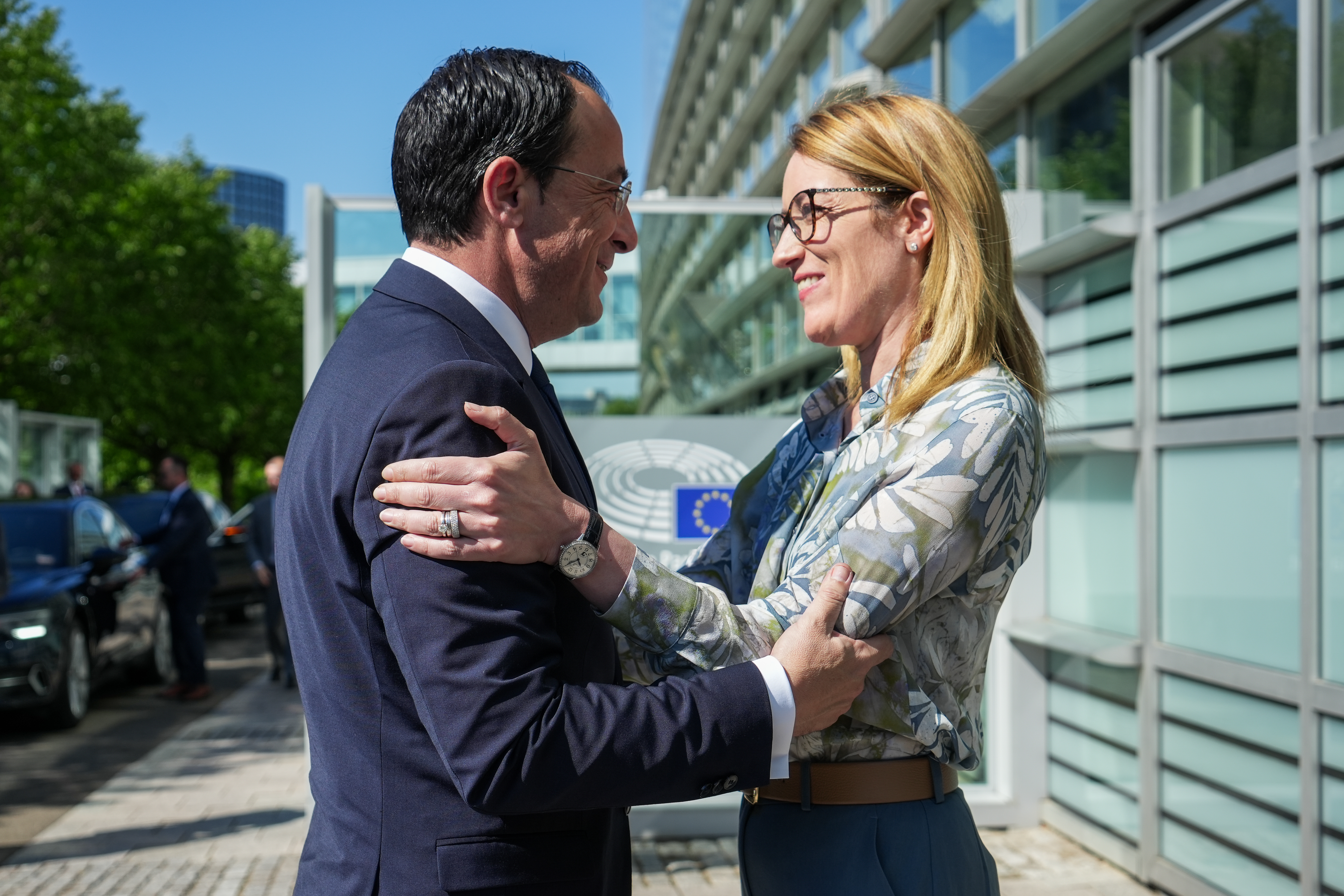
Christodoulides with European Parliament president Roberta Metsola in June 2023

At a European Council summit on 26 October 2023 and at the 2023 Paris Peace Forum, organized by French president Emmanuel Macron, Christodoulides presented his initiative to open a maritime corridor between Cyprus and Gaza, intending to deliver aid to Gaza during the Gaza war. Due to the small distance between Cyprus and the conflict zone, Christodoulides suggested utilizing Larnaca's port for shipping significant amounts of humanitarian relief to Gaza by sea. The aid would be collected, inspected, and stored in Cyprus; after daily checks by a joint committee, including Israel, the aid would be sent to Gaza. The vessels would be accompanied by warships and would arrive at a designated neutral area on the coast of Gaza. Cypriot media have credited retired rear admiral Costas Fitiris with volunteering as one of the principal drafters and operational designers of the Amalthea plan, before his later appointment as Minister of Justice and Public Order.

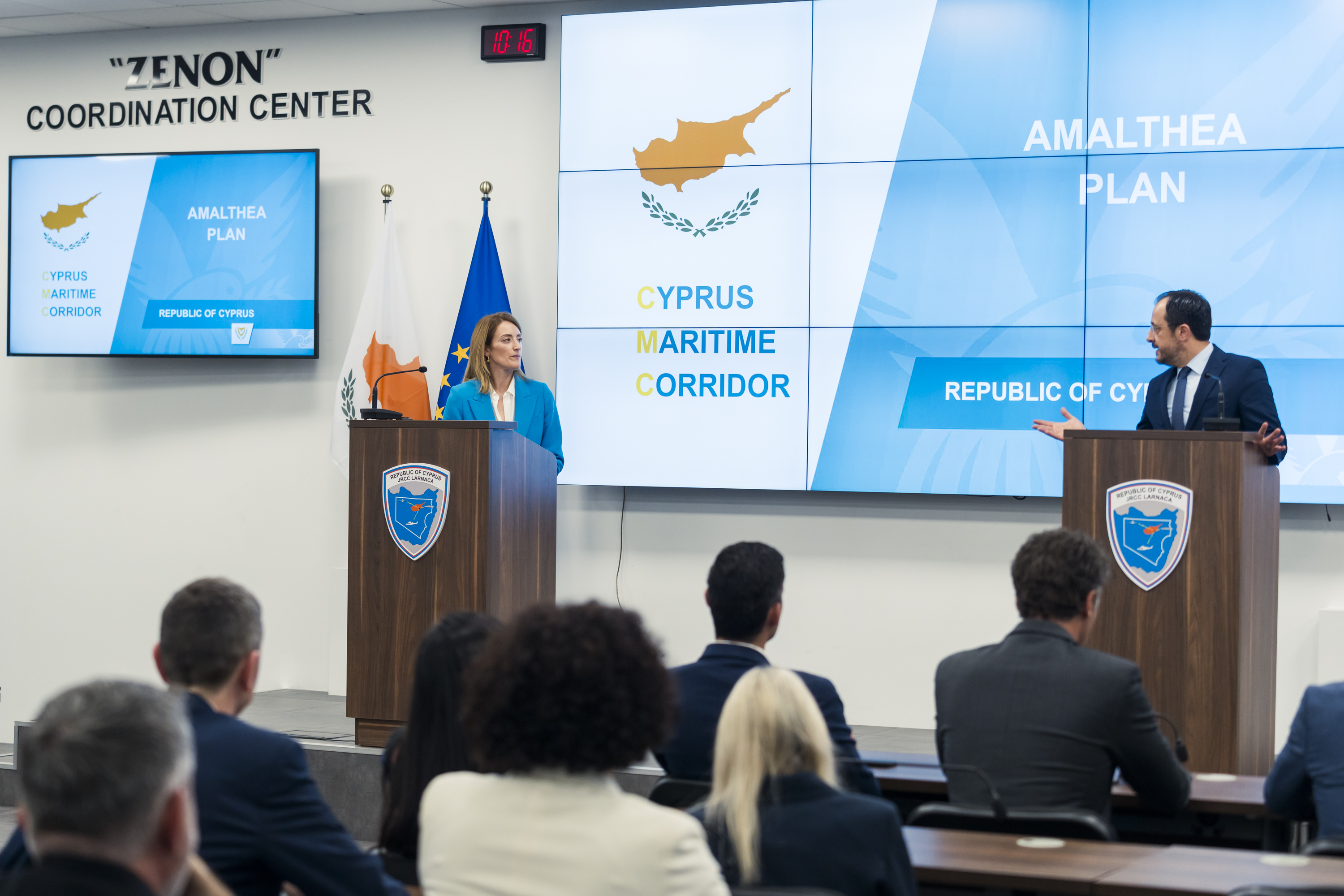
Christodoulides with European Parliament president Roberta Metsola in April 2024

Christodoulides visited Egyptian president Abdel Fattah el-Sisi and King Abdullah of Jordan to inform them about his proposed humanitarian corridor, while also discussing it with German Chancellor Olaf Scholz over the phone. The initiative received positive recognition from the international community and gained approval from the Israeli government. The first step was completed on 1 January 2024, when Cyprus and the United Kingdom collaborated to successfully send 87 tonnes of aid to Gaza through Port Said in Egypt. The aid was then transferred through the Rafah border without security checks in Israel.

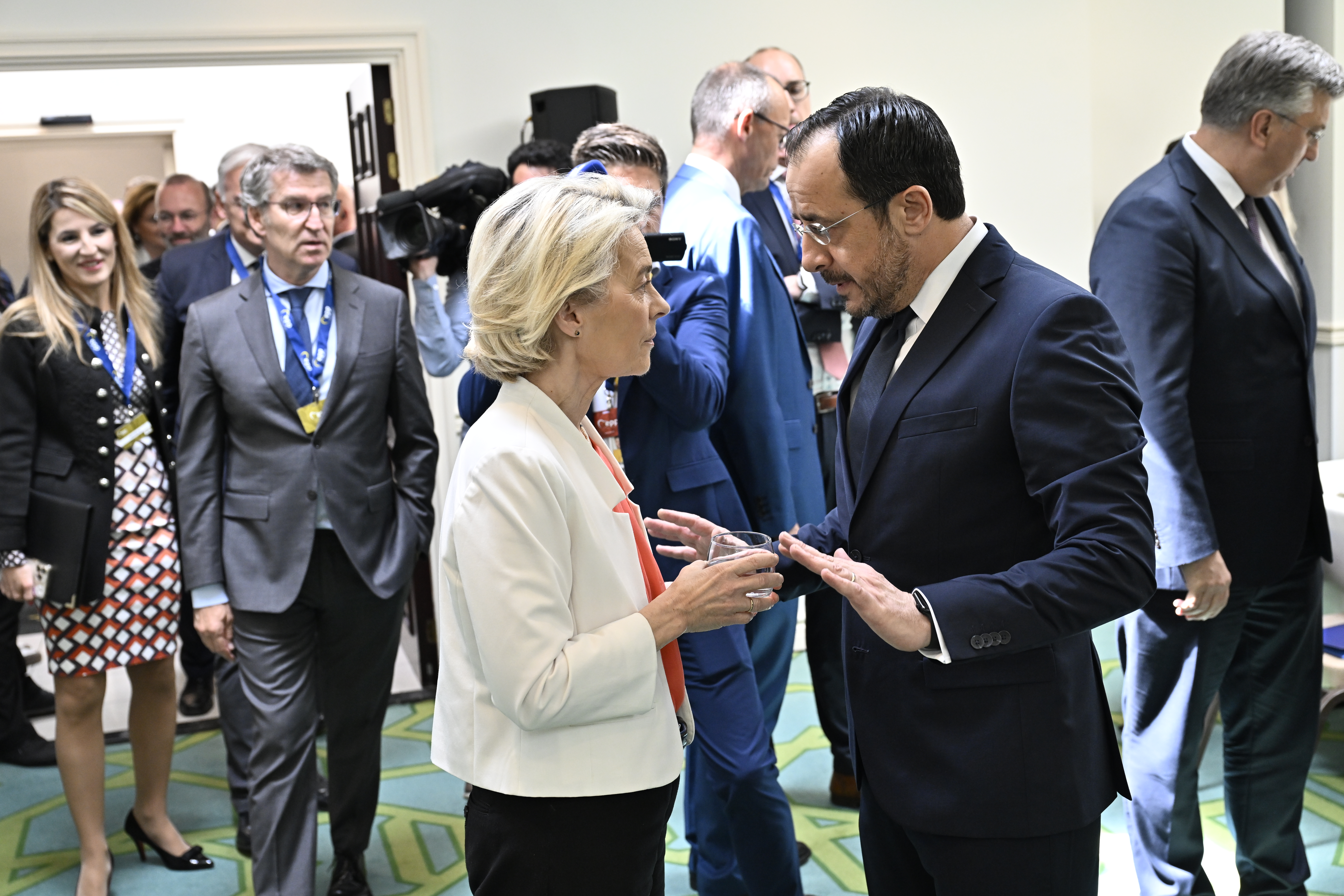
Christodoulides with European Commission president Ursula von der Leyen in June 2024

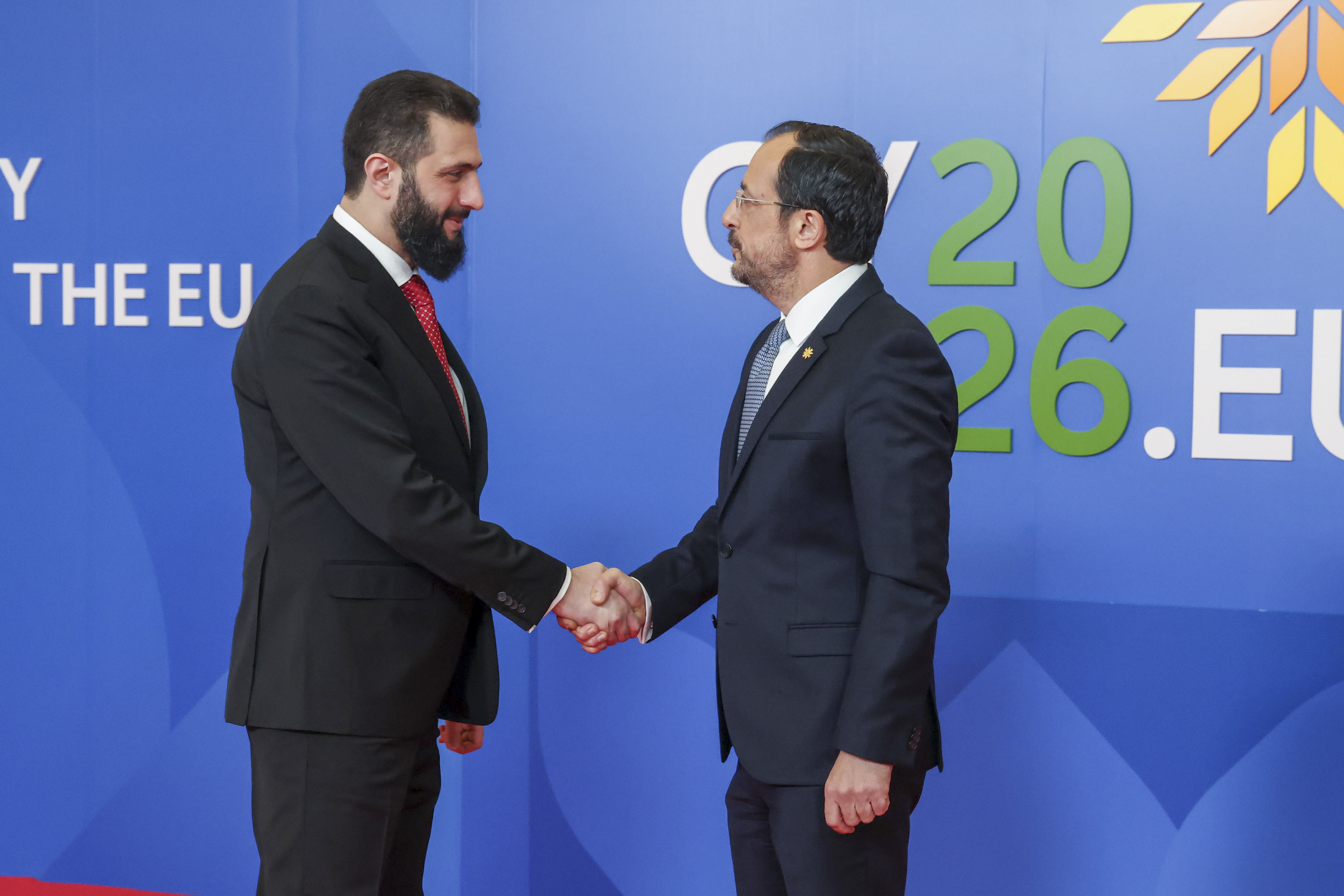
Christodoulides with Syrian President Ahmed al-Sharaa, 24 April 2026

On 4 March 2024, Ursula von der Leyen declared the European Commission's support for Cyprus' humanitarian corridor initiative, scheduling a visit to Cyprus on 8 March to assess the infrastructure. The initiative also gained support by the United States, with president Joe Biden announcing on 8 March that the United States Armed Forces will establish a temporary port in Gaza to enhance sea-based humanitarian aid delivery. The port will handle large vessels carrying food, medicine, and water, with initial shipments arriving via Cyprus. The United States will collaborate on security and coordinate with UN agencies and humanitarian operations on the ground. The corridor is backed by aid from the United Arab Emirates.

On 12 March 2024, the Spanish NGO's salvage vessel Open Arms departed from the port of Larnaca to deliver humanitarian aid to Gaza. The ship towed a barge loaded with supplies provided by the American charity World Central Kitchen and funded by the United Arab Emirates. The aid included 200 tonnes of food staples such as rice, flour, and cans of tuna. The ship reached an undisclosed location off the coast of Gaza, navigating a newly opened shipping route. The mission faced several technical challenges, including capacity and weather concerns. Construction of a makeshift jetty in Gaza facilitated unloading, overcoming Israel's restrictions on contact with Gaza's population.

On 21 March 2024, technocrats from 36 countries convened at the Zenon Coordination Center in Larnaca to discuss bolstering the plan, coinciding with the imminent departure of a second ship from Larnaca to transport 500 tons of aid to Gaza. Efforts are underway to secure funding for the long-term operation of the Amalthea Plan, with Dutch Prime Minister Mark Rutte announcing a €10 million contribution and the EU pledging €70 million in funding.

=== Economy ===
On 20 December 2023, Labor Minister Yiannis Panayiotou announced a minimum wage increase from €940 to €1,000 per month. Employers initially opposed the raise and then proposed an increase to €970, while unions sought €1,020. The government's decision to increase the minimum wage to €1,000 was met with varying reactions from stakeholders.

In June 2024, the credit rating agencies Fitch and S&P upgraded Cyprus' long-term rating from "BBB" to "BBB+". The budget surplus of 3.1% is among the highest in the EU and the national debt is expected to fall to 65.1% of GDP by 2025, down from 115% in 2020, reflecting one of the highest debt reduction rates in the EU. The agencies also predict strong annual growth of around 3% for the period from 2024 to 2027, despite challenges posed by the Russian invasion of Ukraine and the Gaza war.

In November 2024, the credit rating agency Moody's Ratings upgraded Cyprus' credit rating by two notches from Baa2 to A3, citing the country's sustained fiscal improvements, significant debt reduction, and stable economic growth.

=== Immigration ===
Upon taking office in early 2023, Christodoulides faced a significant migrant crisis that was further exacerbated by the outbreak of the Gaza war later that year. He declared that Cyprus was in "a state of serious crisis" and called for EU intervention to manage the flow of irregular migrants from nearby Lebanon. In June 2024, he established the Deputy Ministry of Immigration with Nikolas Ioannides as its first Deputy Minister. During Christodoulides' first year in office, Cyprus saw a substantial increase in the deportation of illegal migrants and a 50% decrease in new arrivals, earning praise from European officials. According to the Interior Ministry, new arrivals had dropped to 220 by May 2024, down from 21,565 in May 2022; the number of individuals at the Pournara Emergency Reception Centre decreased to 254 by May 2024, down from 3,145 in April 2022.

=== Digital transformation ===
In October 2023, Christodoulides' government unveiled its ambitious plans for digital transformation, securing €282 million in EU funding for the realisation of the "Strategic Plan 2024–2026". This comprehensive plan encompasses diverse initiatives, including the integration of artificial intelligence, the promotion of ultra-high-speed network connectivity, the intensification of digital skills through education, support for research and innovation, encouragement of start-up entrepreneurship, and the reinforcement of defense mechanisms against cyber threats. The Deputy Ministry of Innovation plays a pivotal role in implementing these initiatives, focusing on three key pillars: the digital transformation of Cyprus, the development of a sustainable innovative economy, and the protection of the country's infrastructure. The transformation aims to enhance efficiency in services, automate processes, increase governance transparency, and stimulate innovation, ultimately fostering economic development and job creation. In his role as Christodoulides' Deputy Minister of Research, Innovation and Digital Policy, Philippos Hadjizacharias highlighted the government's goal of turning Cyprus into a leading technology hub.

=== Foreign policy ===
On 28 April 2025, Christodoulides was meeting with King Felipe VI of Spain in Madrid's Palacio de la Zarzuela when the Iberian Peninsula suffered a major blackout, although the meeting was not severely affected.

==== Relations with the United States ====
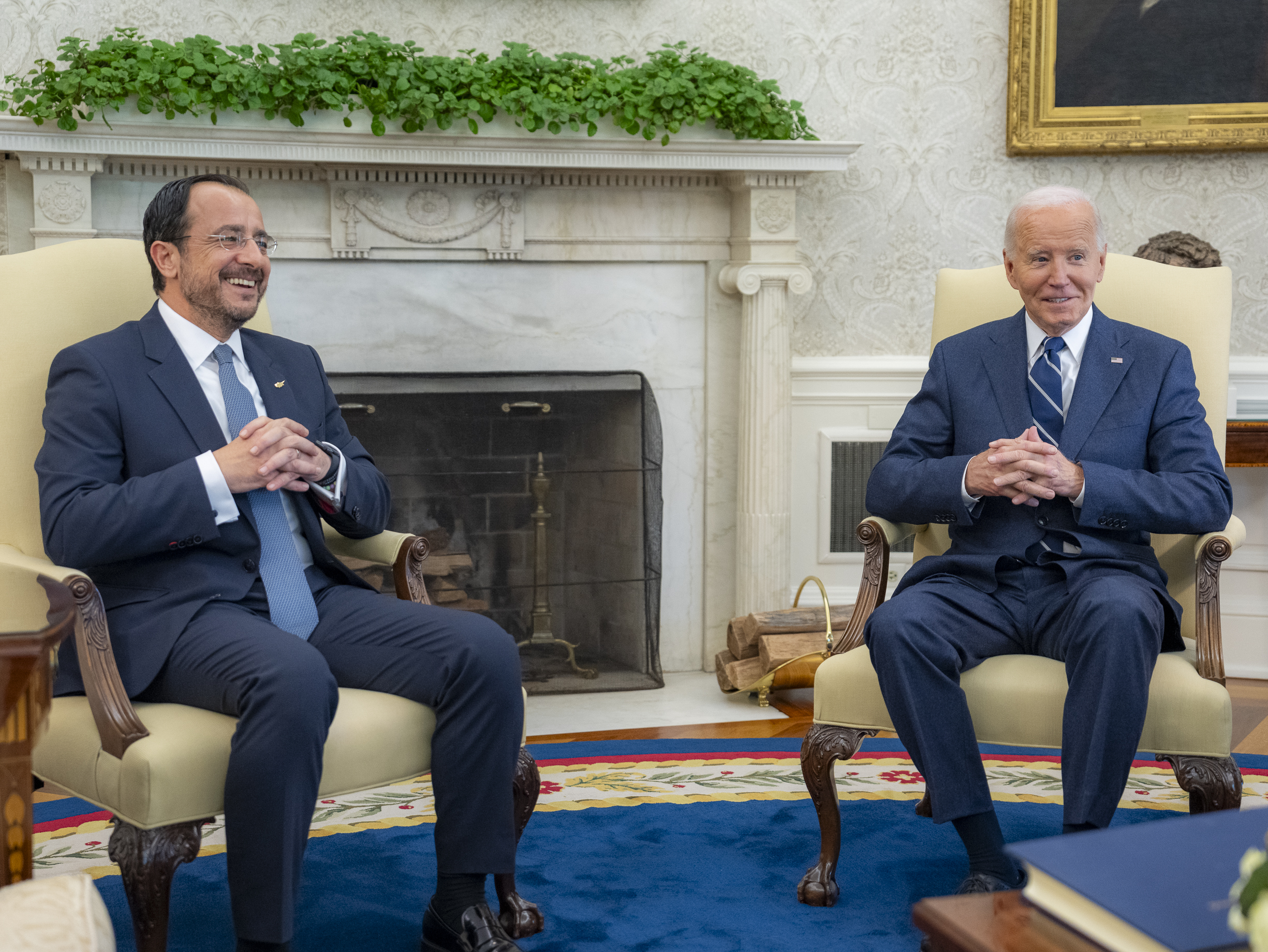
Christodoulides with U.S. president Joe Biden in the Oval Office on 30 October 2024

Cyprus and the United States have initiated a strategic dialogue during Christodoulides' presidency, significantly deepening the two countries' relations in areas such as security, energy, and investment. The dialogue placed Cyprus among a select group of nations engaged in high-level talks with the U.S. twice a year, and advanced Cyprus' goal of joining the U.S. Visa Waiver Program.

Christodoulides accepted U.S. President Joe Biden's invitation to visit the White House on 30 October 2024, marking the first time a Cypriot president visited the White House since Glafcos Clerides was received by Bill Clinton in June 1996. The two held official discussions on topics including bilateral relations, energy diversification, and regional and international stability. Biden also expressed optimism for the reunification of Cyprus on the basis of a bizonal, bicommunal federation.

On January 15, 2024, U.S. President Joe Biden signed a deal integrating Cyprus into three U.S. defense programs: Foreign Military Sales, Excess Defense Articles, and Title 10 for training and equipping foreign security forces.

== Controversies ==
Christodoulides came under scrutiny by the public and media in both Cyprus and Greece in January 2024 for firing his Minister of Defense, Michalis Giorgallas, reportedly after the Greek government disagreed with Giorgallas' stance on a joint defense doctrine.

== Personal life ==
Christodoulides has four children with his wife, Philippa Karsera, a diplomat from Dora. They met in 1999 as newly appointed diplomatic attachés in the Ministry of Foreign Affairs. She served at the Cypriot High Commission to the United Kingdom in London and then at the Cypriot Embassy in Athens and the Permanent Representation of Cyprus to the European Union in Brussels. She was then promoted to deputy director of the President's Diplomatic Office at Cyprus' Presidential Palace. In February 2022, she began leading the crisis management directorate in the Ministry of Foreign Affairs.

In February 2025, Christoudoulides was sent a list of demands by an anonymous social media account which said that he and his family would be in immediate danger if he did not comply. The Presidential Guard thus increased his protection, whilst the country's police forces and intelligence service began a joint investigation into the threat.

== Writing ==
Christodoulides has contributed to domestic and international academic journals, and is the author of the books Plans for Solution of the Cyprus Problem 1948–1978 (2009) and Relations between Athens and Nicosia and the Cyprus Problem 1977–1988 (2013).

== Honours and awards ==
=== National honours ===
- Cyprus: Grand Master and Grand Collar of the Order of Makarios III (28 February 2023)
- Cyprus: Grand Master of the Order of Merit of the Republic of Cyprus (28 February 2023)

=== Foreign Honours ===
- Germany: Grand Cross Special Class of the Order of Merit of the Federal Republic of Germany (12 February 2024)
- Greek Orthodox Patriarchate of Jerusalem: Knight Grand Cross of the Order of the Orthodox Crusaders of the Holy Sepulchre (22 March 2018)
- Greece: Grand Cross of the Order of the Redeemer (13 March 2023)
- Italy: Knight Grand Cross with Collar of the Order of Merit of the Italian Republic (26 February 2024)
- Netherlands: Knight Grand Cross of the Order of the Netherlands Lion (4 March 2025)
- Poland: Grand Cross of the Order of Merit of the Republic of Poland (4 October 2021)
- Serbia: Order of the Serbian Flag, First Class (4 May 2021)
- Kazakhstan: Order of Friendship, First class (3 June 2026)

== See also ==
- List of current heads of state and government
- List of heads of the executive by approval rating
- List of Queens College people

Political offices
Preceded by Ioannis Kasoulidis	Minister of Foreign Affairs; 2018–2022	Succeeded by Ioannis Kasoulidis
Preceded by Nicos Anastasiades	President of Cyprus; 2023–present	Incumbent
