= Constantinos Kombos =

Cypriot jurist, academic and politician

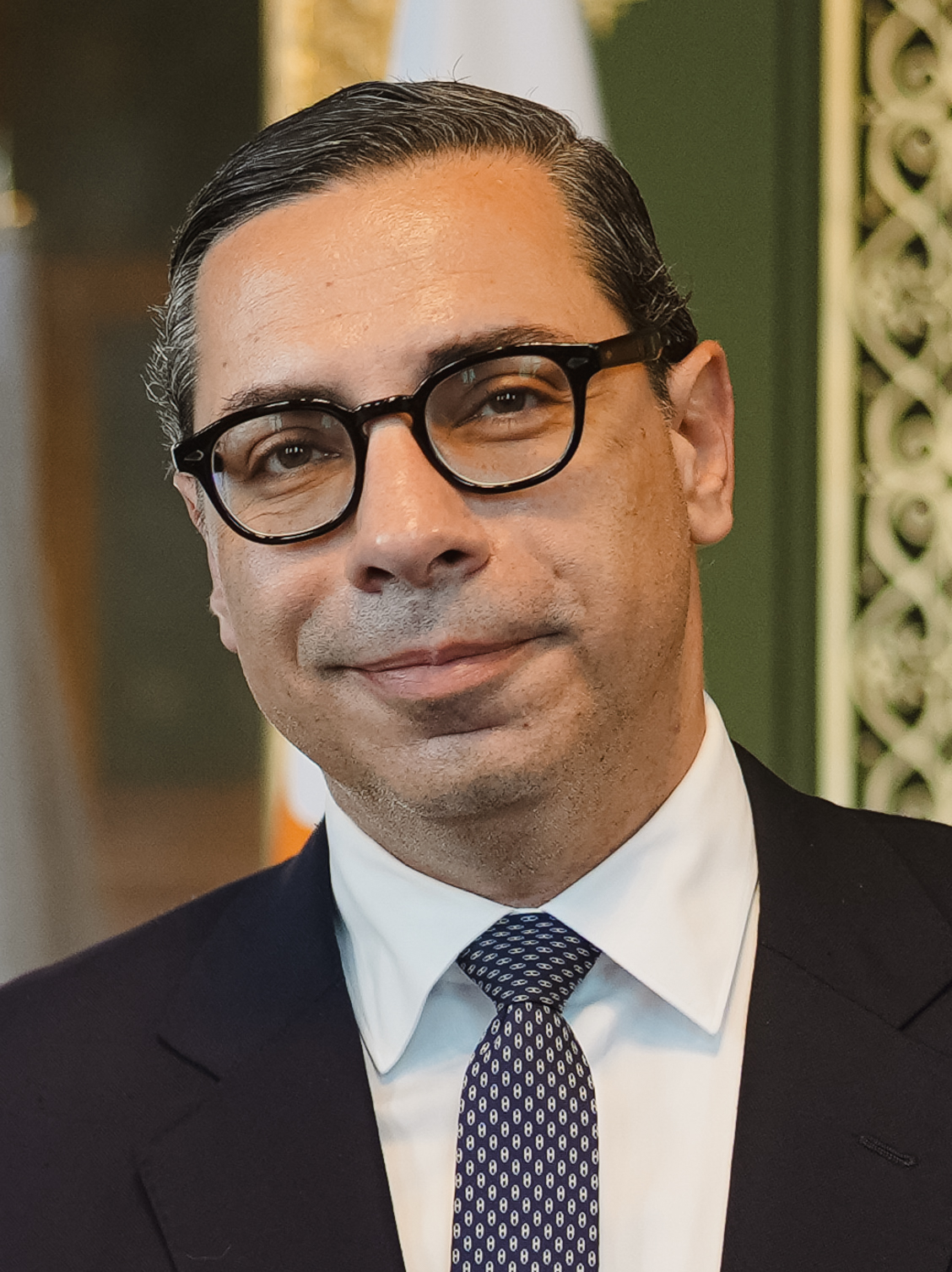
Kombos in 2026

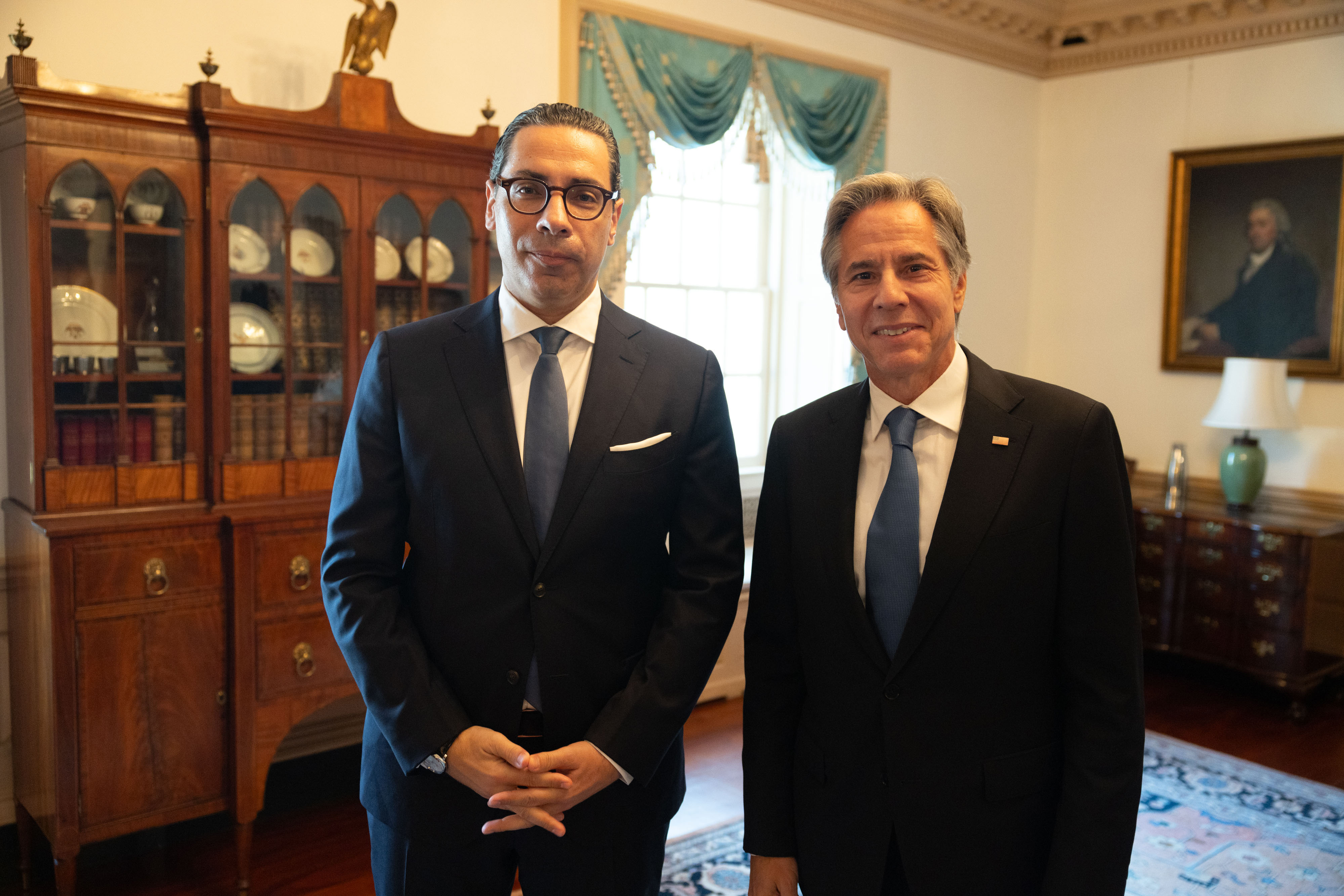
Kombos with U.S. Secretary of State Antony Blinken in Washington, D.C., 17 June 2024

Constantinos Kombos (Greek: Κωνσταντίνος Κόμπος; born 17 October 1976) is a Cypriot jurist, academic, and politician who has served as Minister of Foreign Affairs since 1 March 2023. He was born in Limassol.

Kombos has been described as the most "protected" member of the Cypriot government by writer Stavros Christodoulou. Kombos has come under suspicion by Turkish foreign minister Hakan Fidan suggesting that Cyprus has become a center of operations to support Israel, which Kombos has denied. In 2025, a visit by Kombos to Syria sparked concerns from Turkish media.

At the start of the Twelve-Day War, Kombos handled requests to evacuate Cypriot and European citizens from the Middle East affected by the conflict. As the conflict unfolded, Kombos expressed Cyprus's role as a "purely humanitarian" one.
