= Pedro de Castro Van Dúnem =

Angolan politician

Pedro de Castro van Dúnem "Loy"

Minister of Energy of Angola
- In office 1980–1984

Minister of Energy and Petroleum of Angola
- In office 1980–1989
- Succeeded by: Zeferino Cassa Yombo

Minister of State for Production of Angola
- In office 1986–1989

Personal details
- Born: 9 February 1942 Luanda, Angola
- Died: 23 September 1997 (aged 55) Luanda, Angola

Pedro de Castro van Dúnem, also known as Comandante Loy (9 February 1942 – 23 September 1997), was an Angolan politician. He served in various leading functions within the MPLA during the Angolan liberation struggle against Portuguese colonial rule and within the country's government after achieving independence.

== Political life ==
At the end of 1962, he fled Portuguese rule and arrived in January 1963 in Leopoldville, Congo, where he took refuge and, in June 1963, he was elected into the leadership of the Youth of MPLA (JMPLA).

From September 1963 to 1970 he studied electrical engineering in Moscow and underwent military training in the Soviet Union. In 1970 he took over logistical tasks for the military struggle against the Portuguese colonial rule in Angola for the MPLA's Eastern Front, based at the rear base in Dar es Salaam, Tanzania.

In 1975, he was one of the members of the revolutionary council, and then served as Director of the Cabinet of the Minister of Defense. In 1976, he was named Third Deputy Prime Minister of the Angolan government. In 1978 he was assigned the post of Minister for Coordination of the Provinces.

In 1980, he became Minister of Energy, and in the next year he also took over as head of the Ministry of Petroleum. When in 1986 the ministries of energy and petroleum were merged, he continued as minister of the combined ministry.

He served as the Minister of External Relations of Angola from 1989 to 1992. In 1993 he was named administrator of the Central Bank of Angola.

He then served as Minister of Public Works and Urban Affairs from 1996 to 1997, resigning shortly before his death.

== Remembering Comandante Loy ==
In November 2011, the Banco Angolano de Investimentos opened a branch office named "Comandante Loy" in their banking school in Luanda barrio Morro Bento, Belas municipality.

There is a "Comandande Loy" Consortium which is building housing for veterans of the liberation war in Viana and Icolo e Bengo.

Political offices
Preceded by	Minister of Energy; 1980-1984	Succeeded by
Preceded by	Minister of Energy and Petroleum; 1984-1989	Succeeded by Zeferino Cassa Yombo
Preceded by	Minister of State for Production; 1986-1989	Succeeded by
Preceded by Afonso Van-Dúnem M'Binda	Foreign Minister of Angola; 1989–1992	Succeeded by Venâncio da Silva Moura
Preceded by Mateus Morais de Brito Júnior	Minister of Construction and Public Works; 1996–1997	Succeeded by António Henriques da Silva
