= Alekos Michaelides =

Cypriot politician

- Αλέκος Μιχαηλίδης

4th President of the House of Representatives
- In office 22 September 1977 – 4 June 1981
- Preceded by: Spyros Kyprianou
- Succeeded by: Georgios Ladas

Personal details
- Born: 13 August 1933 Mylikouri, Cyprus
- Died: 6 January 2008 (aged 74) Paphos, Cyprus

Alekos Michaelides (13 August 1933 – 6 January 2008) was a Cypriot politician. He served as Foreign Minister, and as President of the House of Representatives from 1977 to 1981.

== Biography ==
Alekos Michaelides was born on August 13, 1933, in Milikouri in the district of the capital Nicosia.

In 1977, he was elected President of the House of Representatives, a post he held until 1981.

He later served as Minister of Foreign Affairs from 1993 until 1997. In 1994, he established stronger diplomatic ties with Israel, opening an embassy there.

Alongside his political career, he was active in the tourism sector. In 1971 he entered the hotel industry, initially through the management of hotel units. He was later associated with the establishment of Thanos Hotels & Resorts, a hospitality group operating in Cyprus.

He studied Economics at the Georgia Tech in the United States.

Michaelides died on 6 January 2008 at the age of 74.
