= Nicos A. Rolandis =

Cypriot politician (1934–2021)

Nicos A. Rolandis (10 December 1934 – 27 May 2021) was a Cypriot politician. He variously served as a Member of parliament, the Minister for Foreign Affairs, and the Minister of Trade, Industry, and Tourism.

== Biography ==
Rolandis was born in Limassol on 10 December 1934. He studied law at the Middle Temple in London, and practiced industrial law before entering politics. He was married and had three children.

== Political career ==
In 1976, Rolandis was one of the founding members of the Democratic Party in Cyprus. In March 1978, he was appointed the Minister of Foreign Affairs by Spyros Kyprianou. He maintained the position until a disagreement with Kyprianou over the Cyprus dispute led to his resignation in 1983.

In September 1986, he founded the Liberal Party and led the party until 1998 when it merged with the Democratic Rally. He was elected as a Member of Parliament from Nicosia in 1991 and stayed in that role until 1996.

He was a candidate in the 1998 Cypriot presidential election. In the first round, he won 0.78% of the vote, and in the second round he supported Glafcos Clerides, who was eventually elected. Subsequently, Rolandis was appointed to the Minister of Trade, Industry, and Tourism post, in which he remained until the end of Clerides' term.
