= Malta–Yugoslavia relations =

Malta-Yugoslavia relations
- Malta: Yugoslavia

Malta and Yugoslavia

Cold War division of Europe before the independence of Cyprus and Malta.

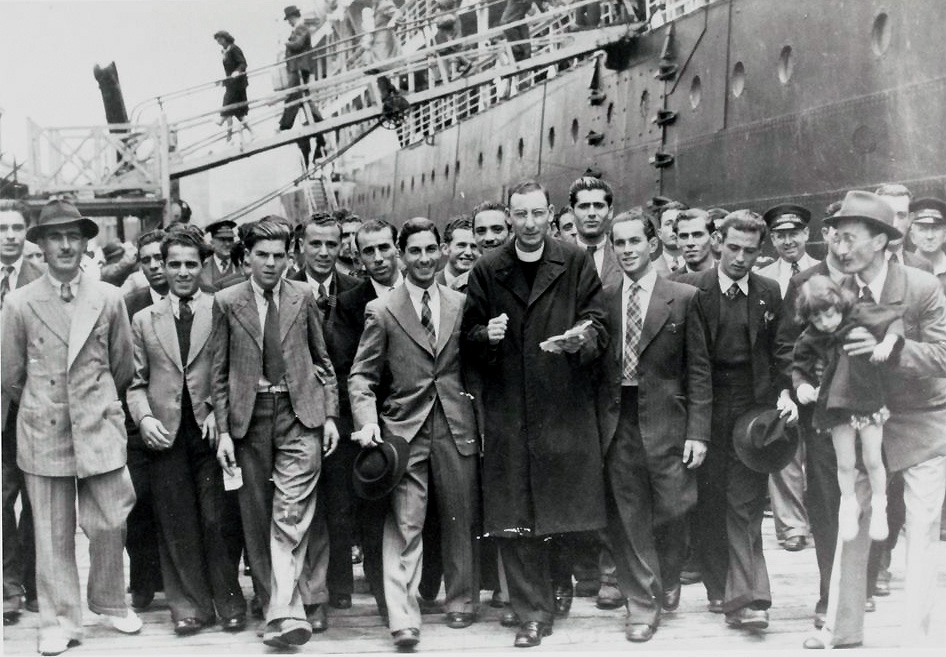
Maltese immigrants land in Sydney from the Yugoslav SS Partizanka, 1948

Malta–Yugoslavia relations (Serbian: Односи Малта-Југославија; Croatian: Odnosi Malte i Jugoslavije; Slovene: Odnosi med Malto in Jugoslavijo; Macedonian: Односите Малта-Југославија) were historical foreign relations between Malta and now split-up Socialist Federal Republic of Yugoslavia. Together with Cyprus, both countries belonged to the small group of European and Mediterranean member states of the Non-Aligned Movement during the Cold War, group which itself part of the larger group of neutral and non-aligned European countries. The Non-aligned countries in Europe advocated for relaxation of divisions, rejection of superpowers' spheres of influence and for cooperation of diverse countries on the continent. During the Cold War period all three Non-Aligned Euro-Mediterranean countries developed close economic cooperation with the European Economic Community.

The first informal contacts between socialist Yugoslavia and Malta occurred in the final stage of the World War II when in 1944 group of Yugoslav Partisans was in Malta for hospital treatment and further military training. Partisans left some of German weapons they took in fight which was subsequently exposed at the National War Museum at Fort Saint Elmo. Due to its commitment to Non-alignment Maltese diplomacy played more prominent role in Belgrade than the country's size or bilateral trade would imply. Malta and Yugoslavia, together with Cyprus, advocated for recognition of European and Mediterranean aspect of Non-alignment. This was perceived as an insistence on the universalist interpretation of the movement and as opposed to exclusively tri-continental proposals (Asia-Africa-Latin America).

During Mintoff's rule in Malta, marked by relations with Qaddafi's Libya, Yugoslavia remained warm ally of Malta, probably the main one in Europe. President Mintoff was invited by the Prime Minister of Yugoslavia Džemal Bijedić to visit Yugoslavia between 9 and 15 October 1971 where he met president Tito, Edvard Kardelj and Mirko Tepavac. Future foreign minister Michael Frendo wrote his graduate thesis in 1977 on "Workers' self-management: A new concept of the legal structure of the enterprise in Malta and Yugoslavia".

== See also ==
- Malta–Serbia relations
- Yugoslavia and the Non-Aligned Movement
- Malta and the Non-Aligned Movement
- 1979 Mediterranean Games
- Death and state funeral of Josip Broz Tito
- 1984 Mediterranean Non-Aligned Countries Ministerial Meeting
- Neutral and Non-Aligned European States
