= Cyprus–Malta relations =

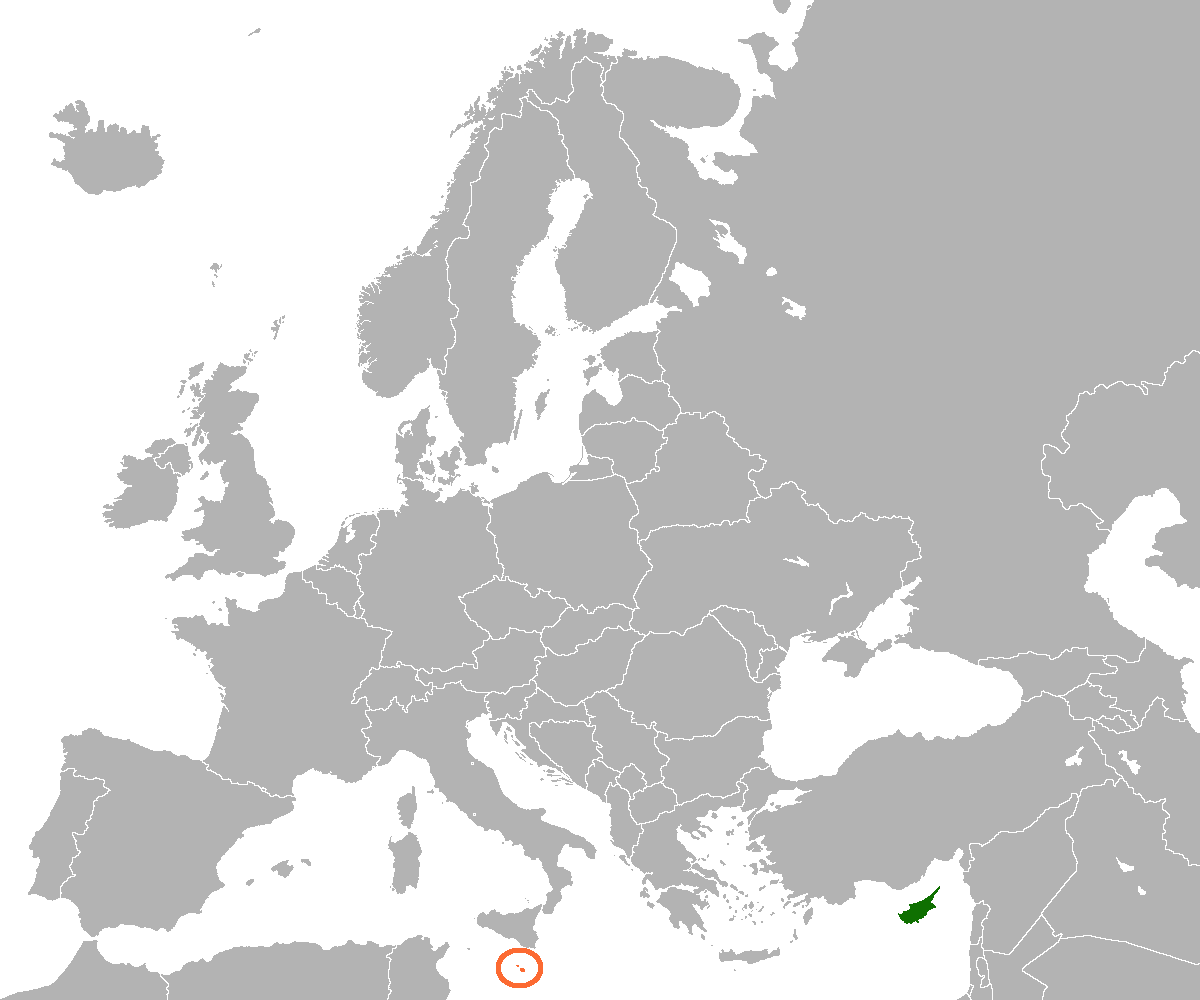
- Cyprus: Malta

Cyprus–Malta relations are foreign relations between Cyprus and Malta. The two countries are members of the European Union, Commonwealth of Nations and Union for the Mediterranean. Cyprus is represented to Malta through its accredited embassy in Rome (Italy). Malta is represented to Cyprus through its accredited embassy in Athens (Greece). The High Commissioner of Malta to Cyprus is H.E. Mr Joseph Cuschieri.

The political relations are close due to similarities between the 2 countries (historical, economical and regional). They are the two island countries of the Mediterranean Sea. By May 2004, the two island countries entered the European Union.

== History ==
Cyprus and Malta established diplomatic relations on 13 September 1972. During the Cold War era both countries cooperated within the framework of the Non-Aligned Movement and the Neutral and Non-Aligned European States. In 1984 discussion at the United Nations Security Council (Meeting 2535) Maltese ambassador Victor Gauci described Cyprus as a "sister island Republic in the Mediterranean". In 2005, Malta's High Commissioner for Cyprus Saviour John Balzan pledged support for the reunification of Cyprus to Cypriot President Tassos Papadopoulos.

Part of the territory of the Republic of Malta & all the territory of the Republic of Cyprus under its control are both part of the Euroregion Euromed. Both countries are members of the Mediterranean Sea Basin Programme & the EU Med Group.

== The European Union and NATO ==
Both countries became members of the European Union on 1 May 2004. Cyprus and Malta are not members of NATO, Cyprus is not a member of NATO's Partnership for Peace, and Malta is also a member.

== See also ==
- Foreign relations of Cyprus
- Foreign relations of Malta
- 2004 enlargement of the European Union
- Cyprus–NATO relations
- Cyprus and the Non-Aligned Movement
  - 1988 Non-Aligned Foreign Ministers Conference
- Malta–NATO relations
- Malta and the Non-Aligned Movement
  - 1984 Mediterranean Non-Aligned Countries Ministerial Meeting
- Neutral and Non-Aligned European States
