= Cyprus–Yugoslavia relations =

- Cyprus: Yugoslavia

Cyprus and Yugoslavia

Cyprus–Yugoslavia relations were historical foreign relations between Cyprus and now split-up Socialist Federal Republic of Yugoslavia. Together with Malta, both countries belonged to the small group of European and Mediterranean member states of the Non-Aligned Movement during the Cold War, group which itself part of the larger group of neutral and non-aligned European countries. Two countries shared similar or identical views on many international issues and cooperated closely in the United Nations and at various gatherings of the non-aligned countries. Makarios III participated in the 1961 Summit Conference of Heads of State or Government of the Non-Aligned Movement in Belgrade which was the first official conference of the Non-Aligned Movement.

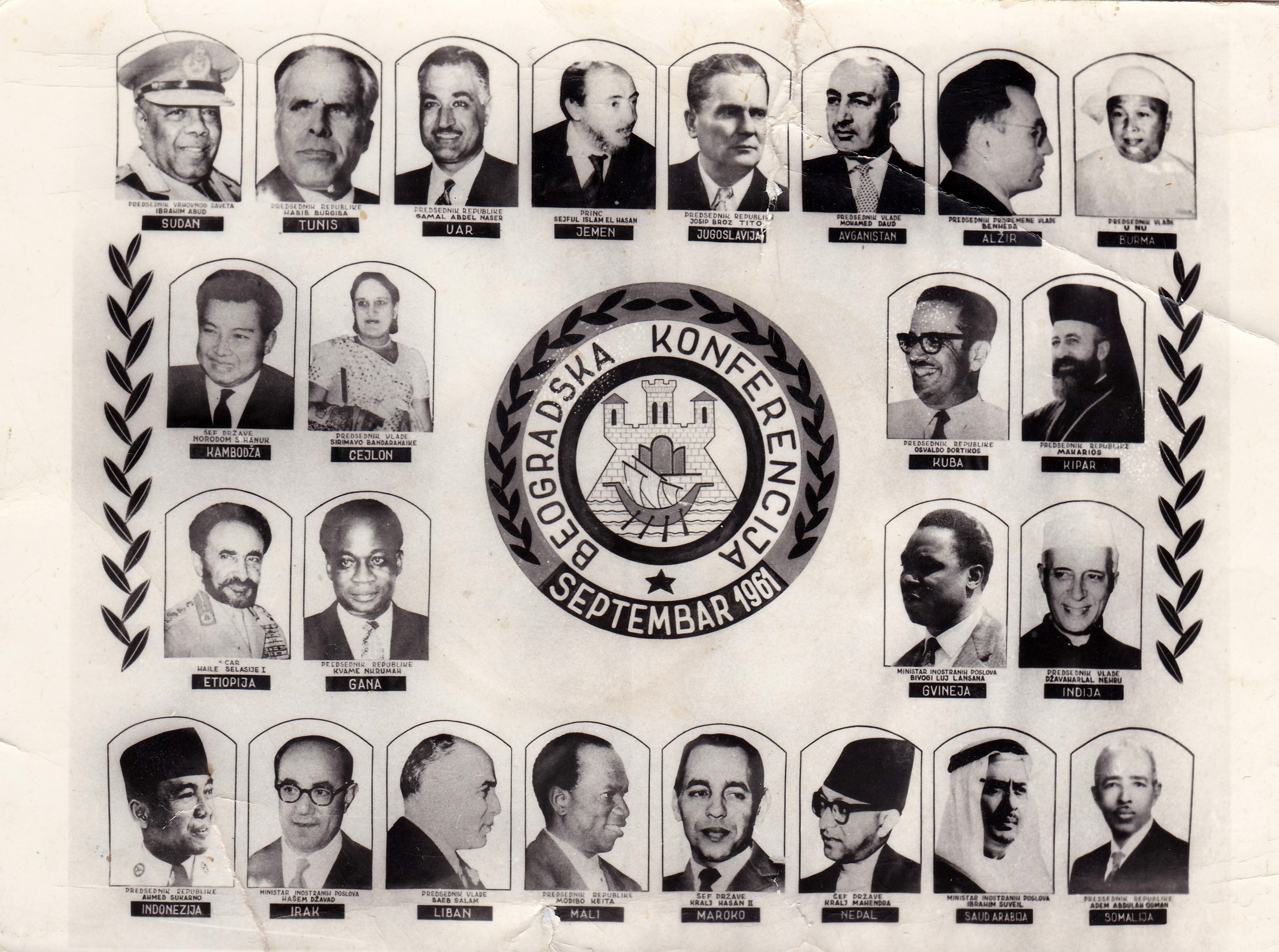
1961 Belgrade Conference participants

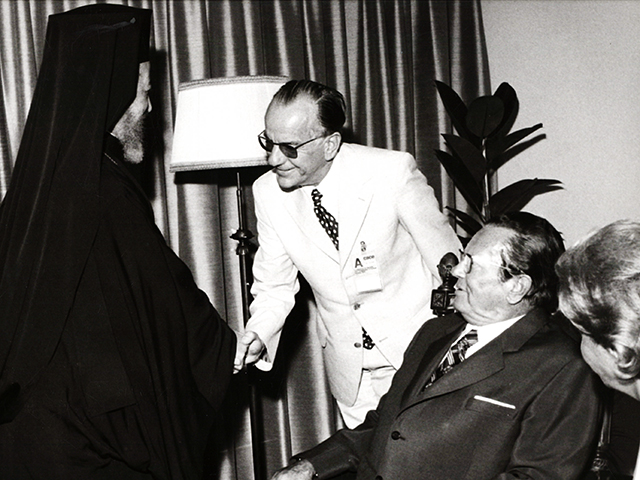
Makarios III and Josip Broz Tito at the Conference on Security and Co-operation in Europe in Helsinki.

Cold War division of Europe before the independence of Cyprus and Malta.

The agreement establishing diplomatic relations between the Republic of Cyprus and the Socialist Federal Republic of Yugoslavia was signed on 10 July 1960. Formal trade between two sides started already during the British Cyprus with Yugoslav export starting in 1945 and Cypriot in 1948. Two countries signed formal trade and economic cooperation agreement in 1962. In 1963 Yugoslavia export amounted for 378 million Yugoslav dinar while import from Cyprus was 90 million dinar. In addition, Cyprus tours were among popular options provided by the Yugoslav tourist agencies.

On August 9, 1964, the Government of Yugoslavia expressed its “greatest concern” over the Cypriot intercommunal violence and underlined that "nothing can justify outside aggression as a method for settling an internal Cypriote problem".

== See also ==
- Yugoslavia and the Non-Aligned Movement
- Cyprus and the Non-Aligned Movement
- Croatia–Cyprus relations
- Cyprus–Serbia relations
- Mediterranean Games
- Death and state funeral of Josip Broz Tito
- Cyprus at the 1984 Winter Olympics
- 1988 Non-Aligned Foreign Ministers Conference
- Neutral and Non-Aligned European States
