= Cyprus–Kosovo relations =

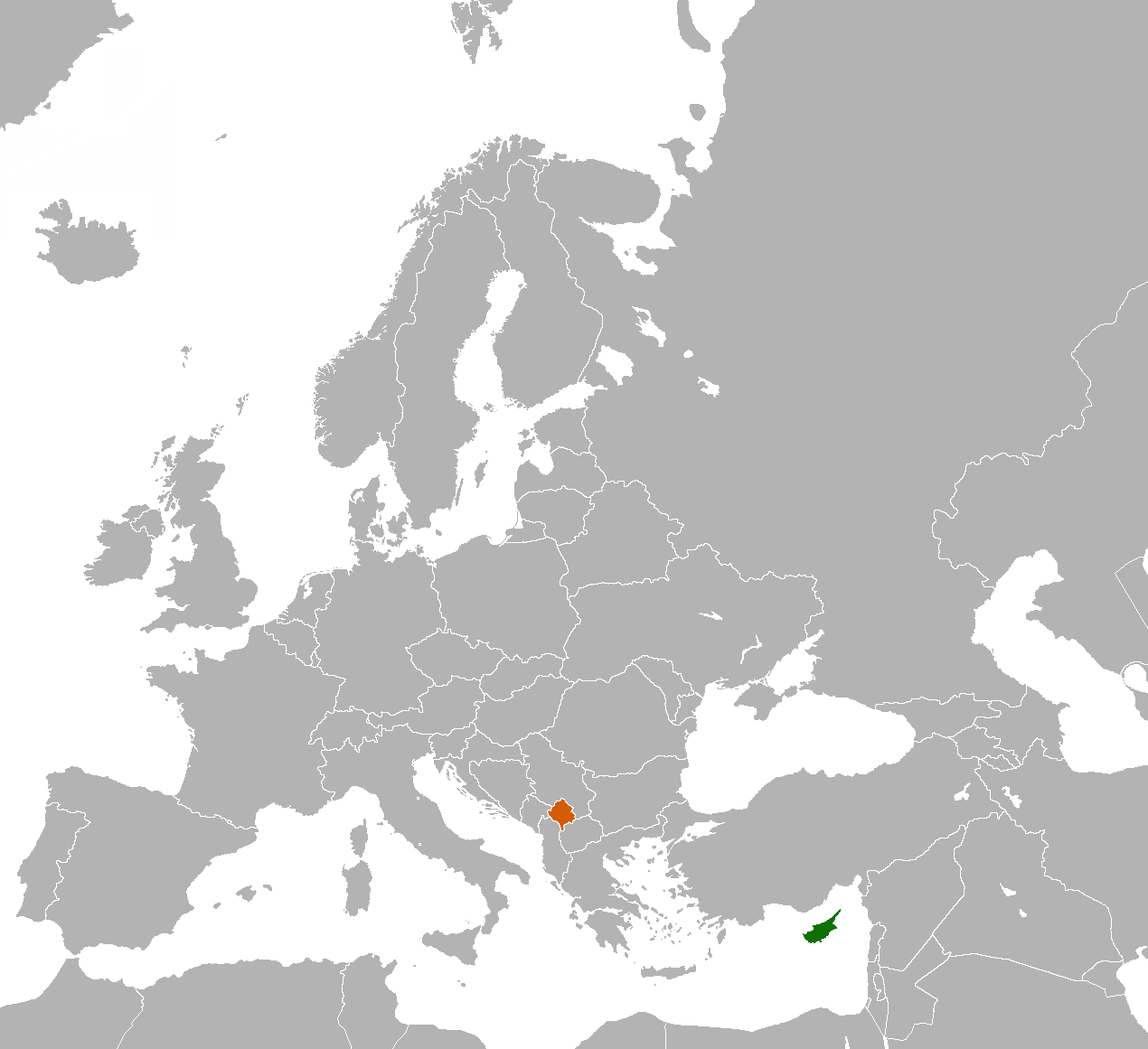
- Cyprus: Kosovo

There are no formal diplomatic relations between Cyprus and Kosovo as Cyprus has not formally recognized Kosovo as a sovereign state.

== History ==
Cyprus is one of the five European Union countries that have not recognized Kosovo's independence. During its EU presidency, Cyprus has not changed its policy towards Kosovo and continues to support Serbia on its European integration course. The Cypriot Minister of Commerce assessed that Serbia should be given more time to fulfill the European Council and Commission's conditions set for the commencement of the accession negotiations. If those conditions are fulfilled, Cyprus will continue to support Serbia.

On 11 February 2008, the Cypriot Foreign Minister Erato Kozakou-Marcoullis, stated that "Cyprus will never recognize a unilateral declaration of independence outside the U.N. framework, and in particular by side-stepping the role of the Security Council". The President of Cyprus Dimitris Christofias, confirmed in March 2008 that Cyprus would not recognize Kosovo as an independent country, out of respect for the territorial integrity and sovereignty of Serbia. Christofias reiterated his opposition to recognition in an interview with a Russian newspaper, saying, "The one thing that Kosovo and Cyprus have in common, as far as the situation in these regions is concerned, is that in both cases, the basic principles of international law and legality, as well as UN decisions, are constantly being violated". The Cypriot president argued that the territorial integrity, sovereignty and independence of both Serbia and Cyprus were being violated.

On 23 February 2009, in a meeting with Serbian president Boris Tadić, Christofias said that "Cyprus has not recognized the unilaterally declared independence of Kosovo and we will not recognize it in the future. We are on your side, not only because your case is similar to ours, but because it is a matter of principles". On 16 June 2009, Minister of Defence of Cyprus Costas Papacostas said that Cyprus will never recognise the independence of Kosovo. In October 2009 this stance was reiterated by Christofias who said Cyprus would not recognize Kosovo, even if all other European Union members did so.

On 28 June 2012, the Cypriot Foreign Ministry stated that while they have not recognized the independence of Kosovo, they were fully committed to further advancing the European perspective of the region. They pledged that during their European Union Council Presidency, Cyprus would exercise its duties in a neutral and credible manner, taking into consideration the positions of all EU member states, but that any actions undertaken during the Presidency should not in any way be interpreted as suggesting any change in their position in relation to non-recognition and to the status of Kosovo under international law.

== See also ==
- Foreign relations of Cyprus
- Foreign relations of Kosovo
- Accession of Kosovo to the EU
- Cyprus–Serbia relations
