= Malta–Serbia relations =

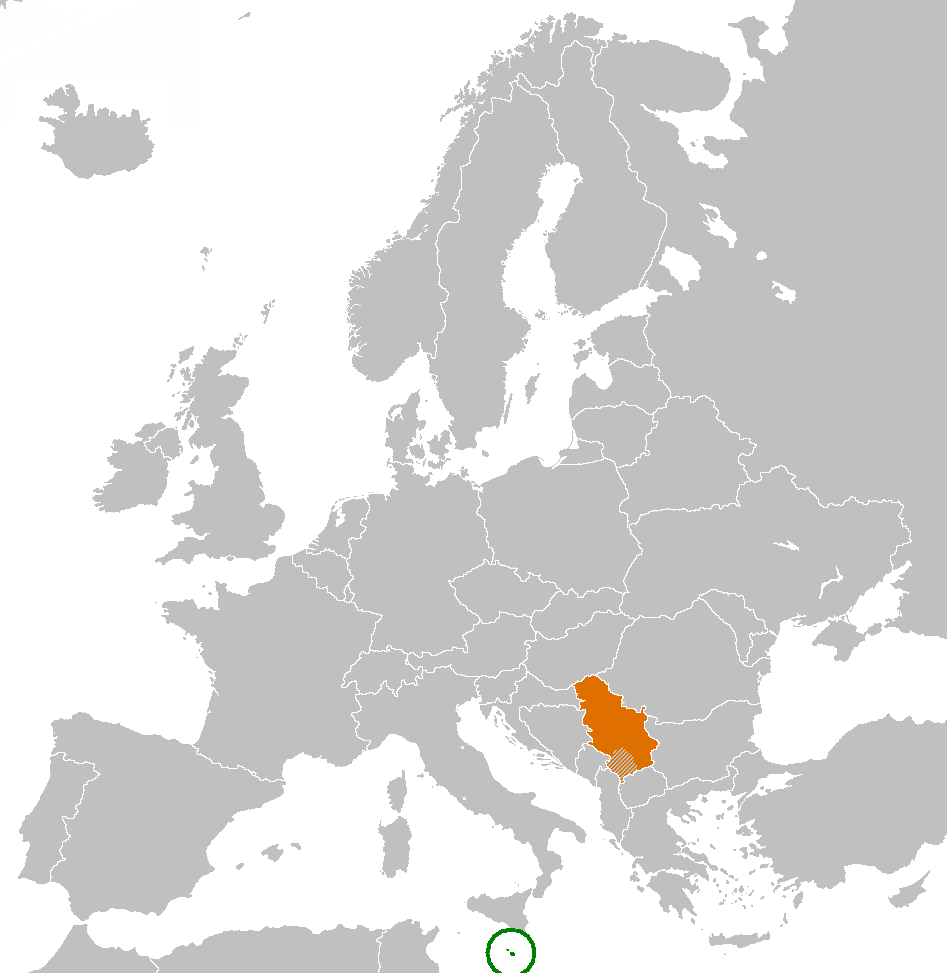
- Malta: Serbia

Malta and Serbia maintain diplomatic relations established between Malta and SFR Yugoslavia in 1969. From 1969 to 2006, Malta maintained relations with the Socialist Federal Republic of Yugoslavia (SFRY) and the Federal Republic of Yugoslavia (FRY) (later Serbia and Montenegro), of which Serbia is considered shared (SFRY) or sole (FRY) legal successor.

== History ==
Relations between Maltese and Serbs took place in early history in the framework of the relations between their masters, the British and the Ottoman Empire.

In 1670, various Serbian Orthodox clergymen from the Eparchy of Marča were exiled and sentenced to life imprisonment in Malta after the eparchy (diocese) became a uniate Eastern Catholic vicariate and their refusal to enter into full communion with the Roman Catholic Church.

One of the first Maltese public figures of Serbian/Montenegrin descent was Giorgio Mitrovich (1795–1885), patriot and politician known for his role in the struggle for freedom of the press in Malta, whose homonym grandfather was a successful privateer originally from Venice-ruled Kotor who moved to Malta around 1770.

In 1918, a group of cadets and personnel of the Royal Serbian Army, on board of the SS Polynesien, was rescued to Malta and healed at Cottonera Hospital after the ship was sunk by a German torpedo.

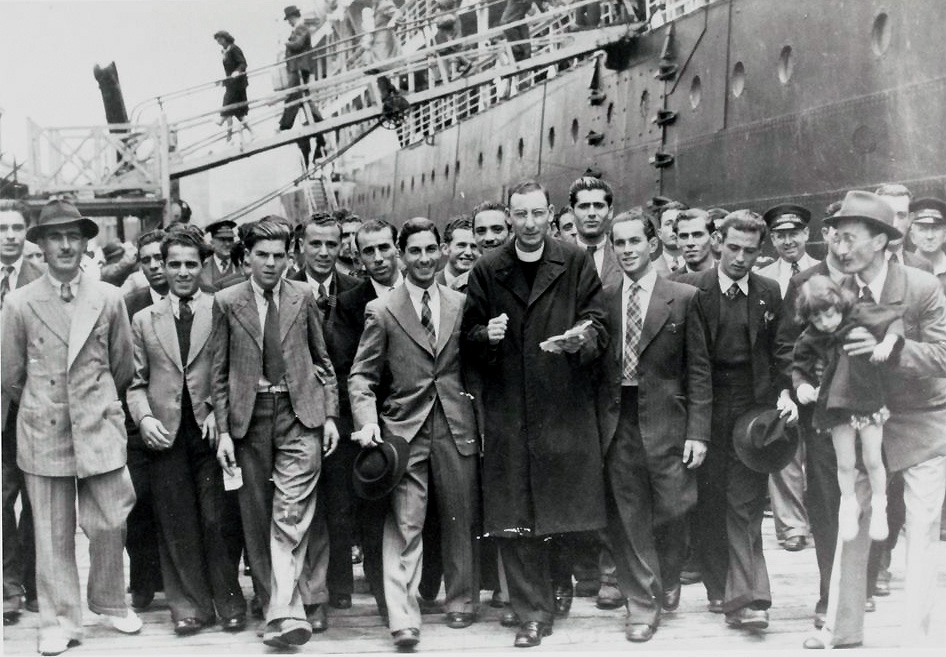
Maltese immigrants land in Sydney from the SS Partizanka, 1948

During the Second World War, as during the first, Malta provided a rest and recuperation setting for British allies - in this case, Tito's Yugoslav partisans, led by major Jerko Juričić, who set up a camp at Binġemma. While in Malta, the partisans (both male and female) could be trained by British experts in the use of both Ally as well as Axis weapons. At least one Yugoslav partisan died of his wounds in Malta, and was buried at the Military Cemetery.

In the late 1940s, Maltese emigrants left to Australia on board of the Yugoslav steamers SS Partizanka and SS Radnik.

Relations between newly independent Malta and socialist Yugoslavia during the Cold War were shaped by the Cold War context. Malta under socialist PM Dom Mintoff joined the Non-Aligned Movement, which had been launched by Yugoslav dictator Tito. Economic cooperation was marked by the construction of a small factory on the island with Yugoslav capitals. In the early 1980s, Yugoslavia donated a ship to Malta, upon the request of Mintoff.

During Mintoff's rule, marked by relations with Qaddafi's Libya, Yugoslavia was a rather warm ally of Malta, probably the primary one in Europe. Future foreign minister Michael Frendo wrote his graduate thesis in 1977 on "Workers' self-management: A new concept of the legal structure of the enterprise in Malta and Yugoslavia".

Malta signed its 12th bilateral double taxation agreement with Serbia in 2009. Foreign Affairs Minister of Malta, Tonio Borg signed two agreements with Serbia during a two-day visit in 2010 about readmission of people residing without authorisation.

== Immigration from Serbia ==
Serb immigration to Malta is a very recent phenomenon. Their number has steadily grown throughout the 2010s, driven by Malta's European Union membership expansion, economic opportunities in tourism and construction, and Malta's appeal as a Mediterranean hub. According to the 2021 census, there were 5,935 Serbia-born people living in Malta, forming fifth-largest foreign-born group in the country.

== Resident diplomatic missions ==
- Malta is accredited to Serbia through a non-resident ambassador based in Valletta (at the Foreign Ministry).
- Serbia has an embassy in Valletta.

== See also ==
- Foreign relations of Malta
- Foreign relations of Serbia
- Malta–Yugoslavia relations
