= Malta and the Non-Aligned Movement =

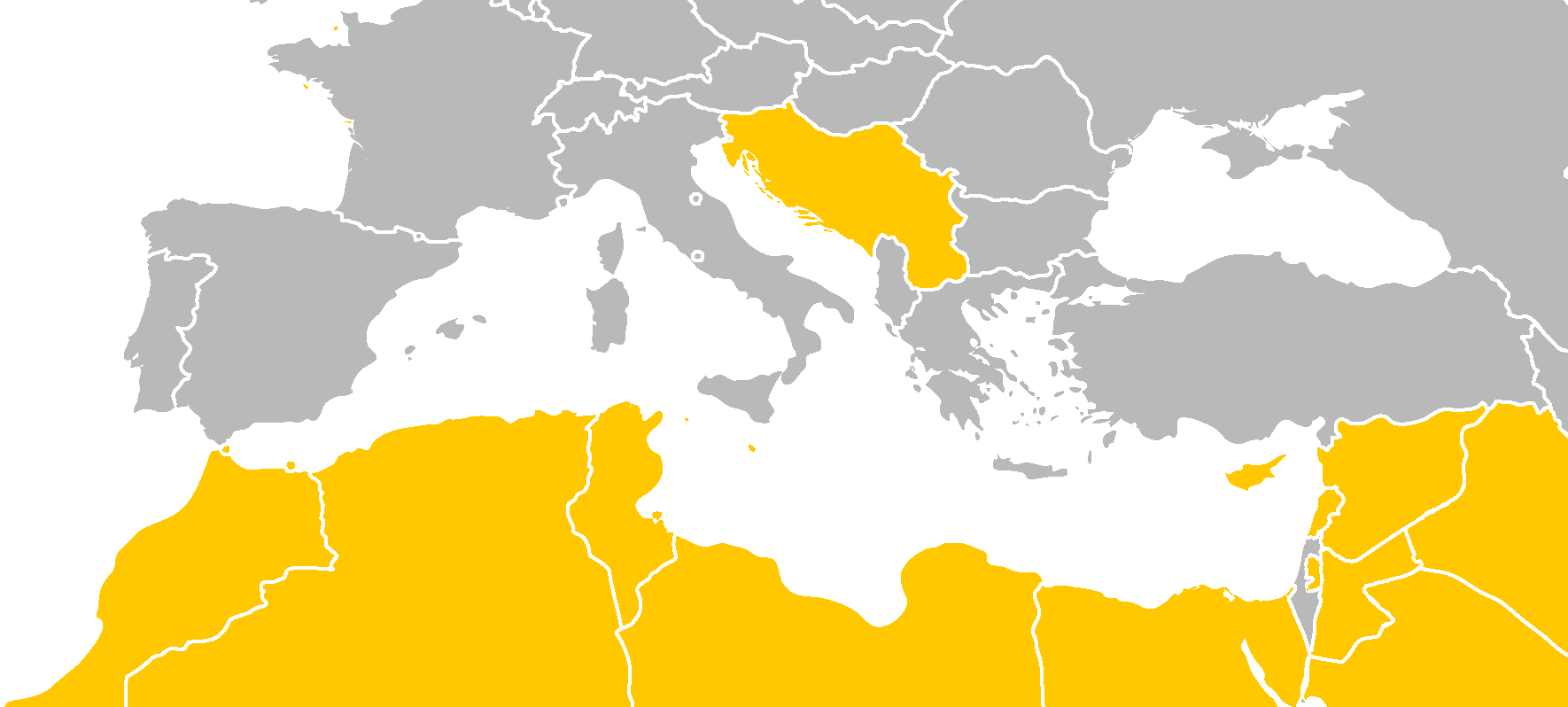
Cold War Mediterranean (Middle East, North African and European) member states of the Non-Aligned Movement.

Malta was the third European member state of the Non-Aligned Movement (after charter members of Cyprus and SFR Yugoslavia) joining it in 1973. The country remained a part of the movement until 2004 when one of the requirements of the 2004 enlargement of the European Union was for Malta to leave the Non-Aligned Movement. European integration process therefore affected and limited further Maltese integration and engagement with its Non-Aligned neighbouring states.

Maltese participation in the movement was motivated by advocacy of peace and development in the Mediterranean and was intensified in the aftermath of the departure of the remaining British troops from the island in 1979. Maltese association with the Non-Aligned countries during the Cold War was promoted by South European (Greek, Portuguese and Maltese) left wing parties closer association with the ideas of the NAM group than with the ideas of the Western European social democracy. In 1984 the country hosted the first in a series of the Mediterranean Non-Aligned Countries Ministerial Meetings.

Principles of neutrality and non-alignment were included into the Constitution of Malta in 1986 as a part of a compromise deal between the ruling Malta Labour Party the major oppositional Nationalist Party.

== See also ==
- Foreign relations of Malta
- EU Med Group
- Cyprus–Malta relations
- Malta–Yugoslavia relations
- Malta–NATO relations
- Libya–Malta relations
- Neutral and Non-Aligned European States
