= 1984 Mediterranean Non-Aligned Countries Ministerial Meeting =

Ministerial Meeting

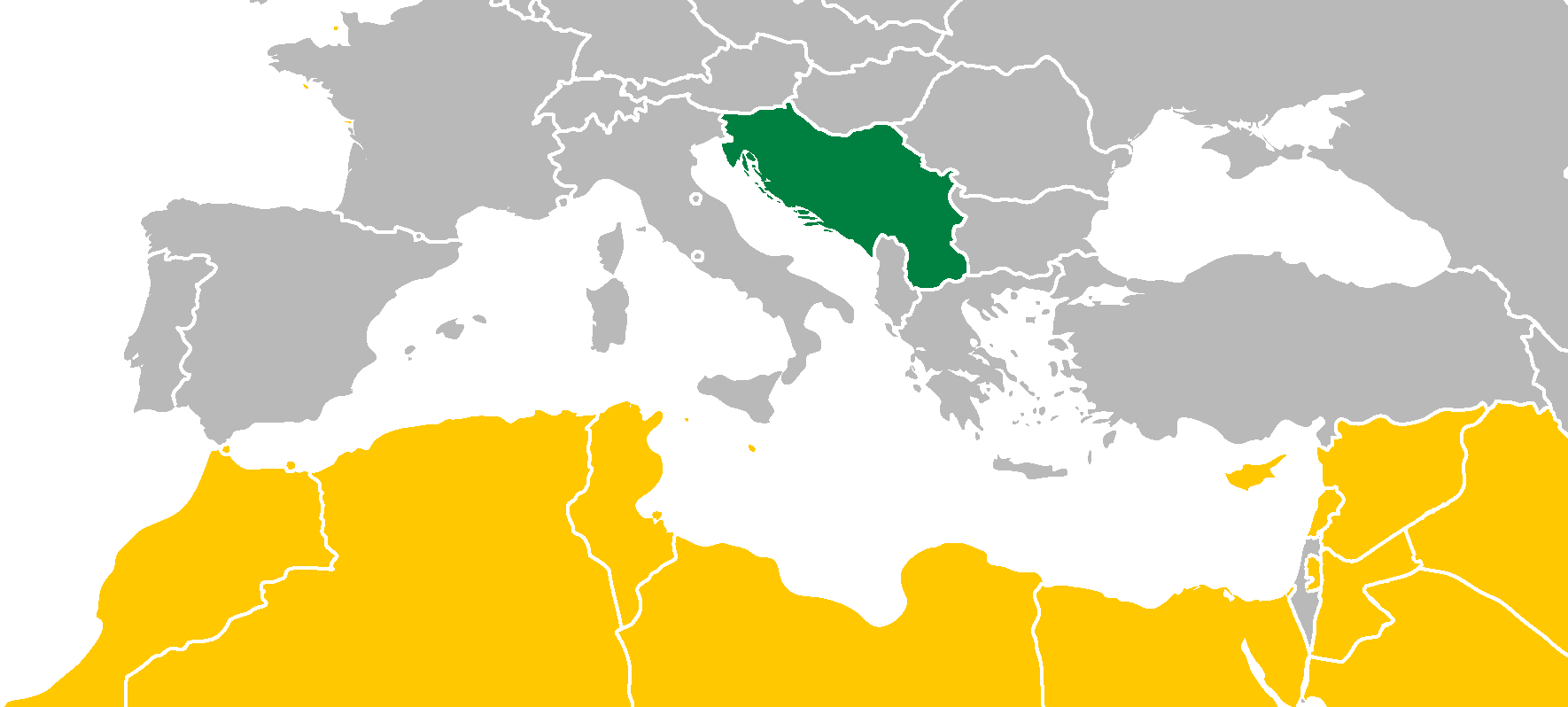
- Mediterranean member states of the NAM in yellow and dark green (Yugoslavia)
- Host country: Malta
- Date: 10-11 September 1984
- Cities: Valletta
- Chair: Agatha Barbara (President of Malta)

The 1984 Mediterranean Non-Aligned Countries Ministerial Meeting (Maltese: Laqgħa Ministerjali tal-Pajjiżi Mediterranji Mhux Allinjati) held in Valletta, Malta on 10 and 11 September 1984 was the first ever ministerial meeting of the Non-Aligned countries from the Mediterranean region. The idea was to host an event with a restricted number of participants from the Mediterranean basin, where common concerns would be addressed. At the time, the group included Southern Mediterranean and Levantine Arab countries and only three European non-aligned countries of Malta, Cyprus and SFR Yugoslavia. The meeting concluded that freedom of the seas in a closed sea, such as the Mediterranean, should be exercised for peaceful purposes without military naval deployment, especially with non-Mediterranean countries. The event was envisaged as a preliminary collective effort to achieving peace in the region.

The following meeting of the group was organized in 1987 on the Brijuni Islands in the Yugoslav constituent Socialist Republic of Croatia. The final document of the meeting was reaffirmed by the whole movement at the 1985 Luanda foreign ministers meeting, which concluded with a call for countries to respect the 1984 Valletta Declaration.

== See also ==
- Foreign relations of Malta
- EU Med Group
- Cyprus–Malta relations
- Malta–Yugoslavia relations
- Libya–Malta relations
