= Cyprus–Serbia relations =

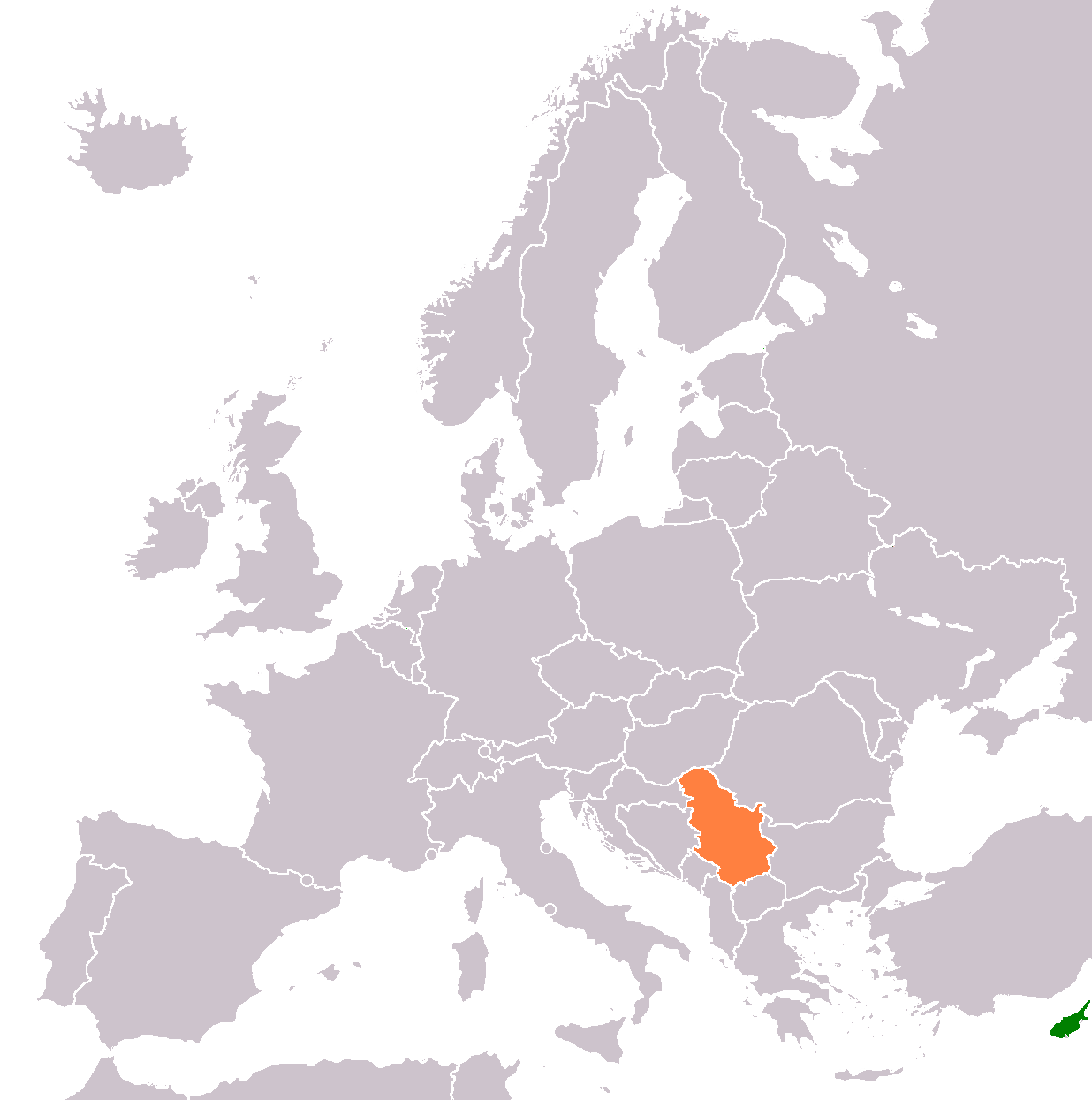
- Cyprus: Serbia

Cyprus and Serbia maintain diplomatic relations established between Cyprus and SFR Yugoslavia in 1960. From 1960 to 2006, Cyprus maintained relations with the Socialist Federal Republic of Yugoslavia (SFRY) and the Federal Republic of Yugoslavia (FRY) (later Serbia and Montenegro), of which Serbia is considered shared (SFRY) or sole (FRY) legal successor.

Relations between two countries are considered strong, due to common European policies and the sharing of Orthodoxy as a common religion, cooperating in finance, military matters and culture.

== Political relations ==
Cyprus has been a supporter of Serbia in its efforts to join the EU. Likewise, Serbia has been advocating a stable Cyprus after the Turkish invasion in 1974 and supporting a lasting solution to the Cyprus dispute. The Foreign Minister of Cyprus Erato Kozakou-Marcoullis underlined the Cyprus Presidency's priority on enlargement in a state visit in Belgrade in 2012, including the Western Balkans region and Serbia. The Cypriot Orthodox Church has had excellent relations with the Serbian Orthodox Church, including acquiring and giving humanitarian aid to Serbia during the wars.

=== Cypriot stance on Kosovo ===
Cyprus is one of the five European Union countries that does not recognise Kosovo's independence. During its EU presidency, Cyprus has not changed its policy towards Kosovo and continues to support Serbia on its European integration course. The Cypriot Minister of Commerce assessed that Serbia should be given more time to fulfil the European Council and Commission's conditions set for commencement of the accession negotiations. If those conditions are fulfilled, Cyprus will continue to support Serbia.

== Economic relations ==
Trade between two countries amounted to $47 million in 2023; Serbia's merchandise exports to Cyprus were about $39 million; Cypriot exports were standing at roughly $8 million.

== Serbs in Cyprus ==
The Serb diaspora in Cyprus is a small expatriate group, with roots tracing to post-Yugoslav migration waves in the 1990s and 2000s and numbering around 1,000–2,000.

== Resident diplomatic missions ==
- Cyprus has an embassy in Belgrade.
- Serbia has an embassy in Nicosia.

== See also ==
- Foreign relations of Cyprus
- Foreign relations of Serbia
- Cyprus–Yugoslavia relations
