= Libya–Malta relations =

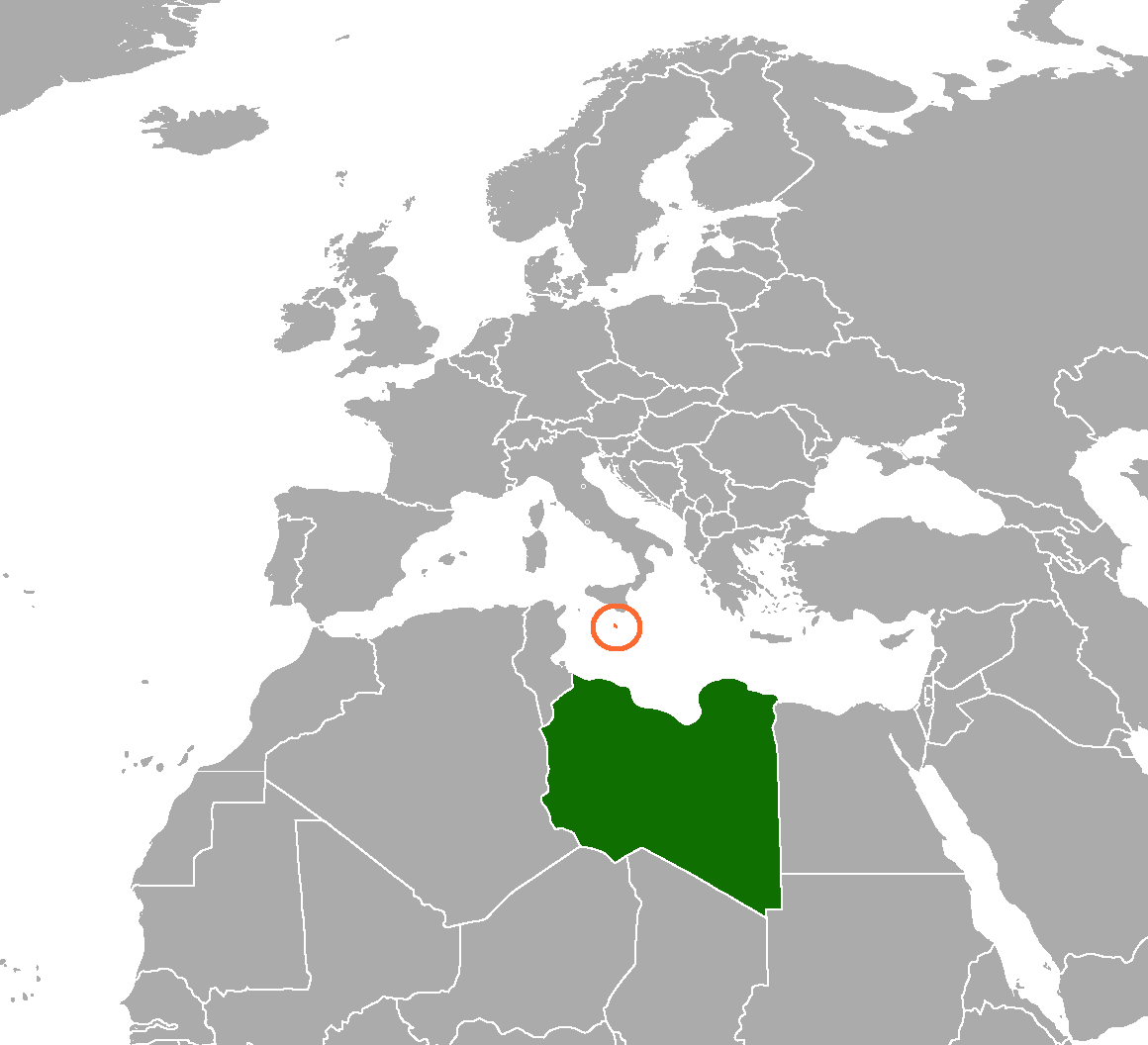

- Libya: Malta

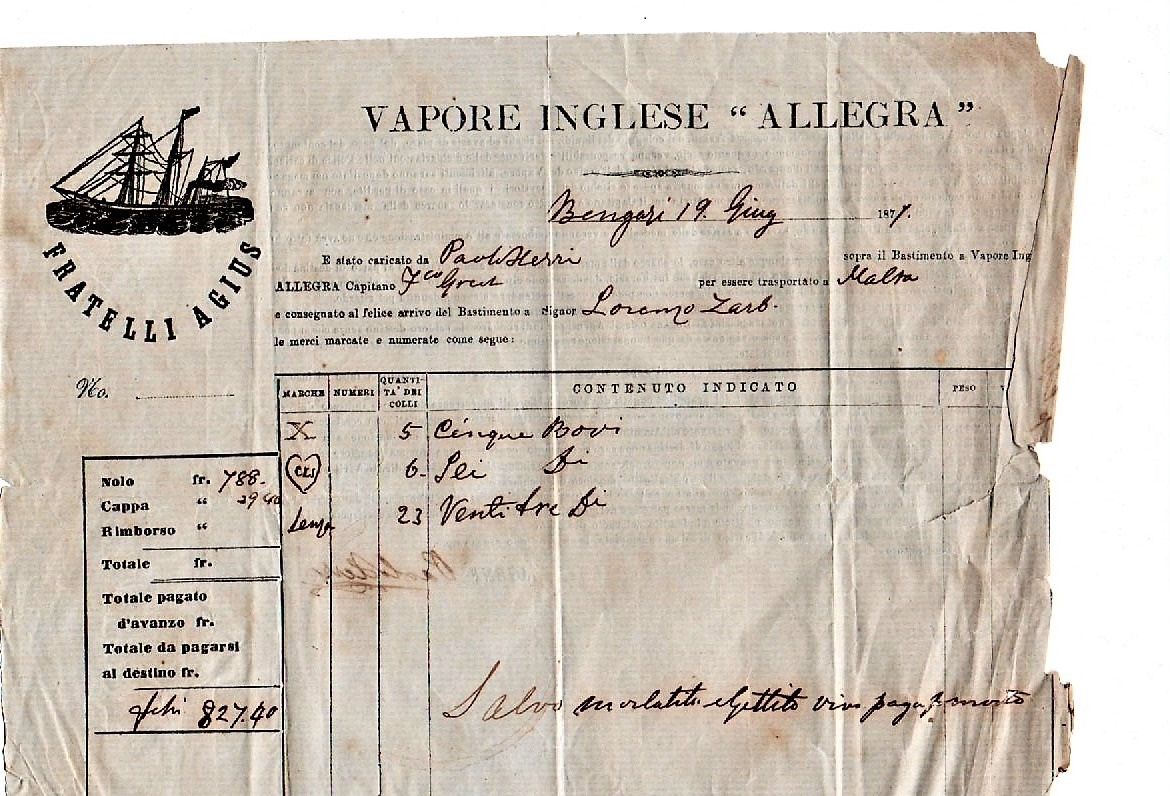
Italian-language loading bill of the English steamship "Allegra", 1871 owned by Fratelli Agius, transporting cattle from Benghazi, Libya to Malta

Libya–Malta relations are foreign relations between the State of Libya and the Republic of Malta. Both countries established diplomatic relations on 11 June 1965, soon after Malta's independence. Both countries had very close ties and cooperation during Dom Mintoff's governments. Libya has an embassy in Attard and Malta has an embassy in Tripoli. In 2013, Libyan Prime Minister Ali Zeidan said that the relationship between the two countries is "excellent".

== History ==
=== Early relations (1964–1980) ===
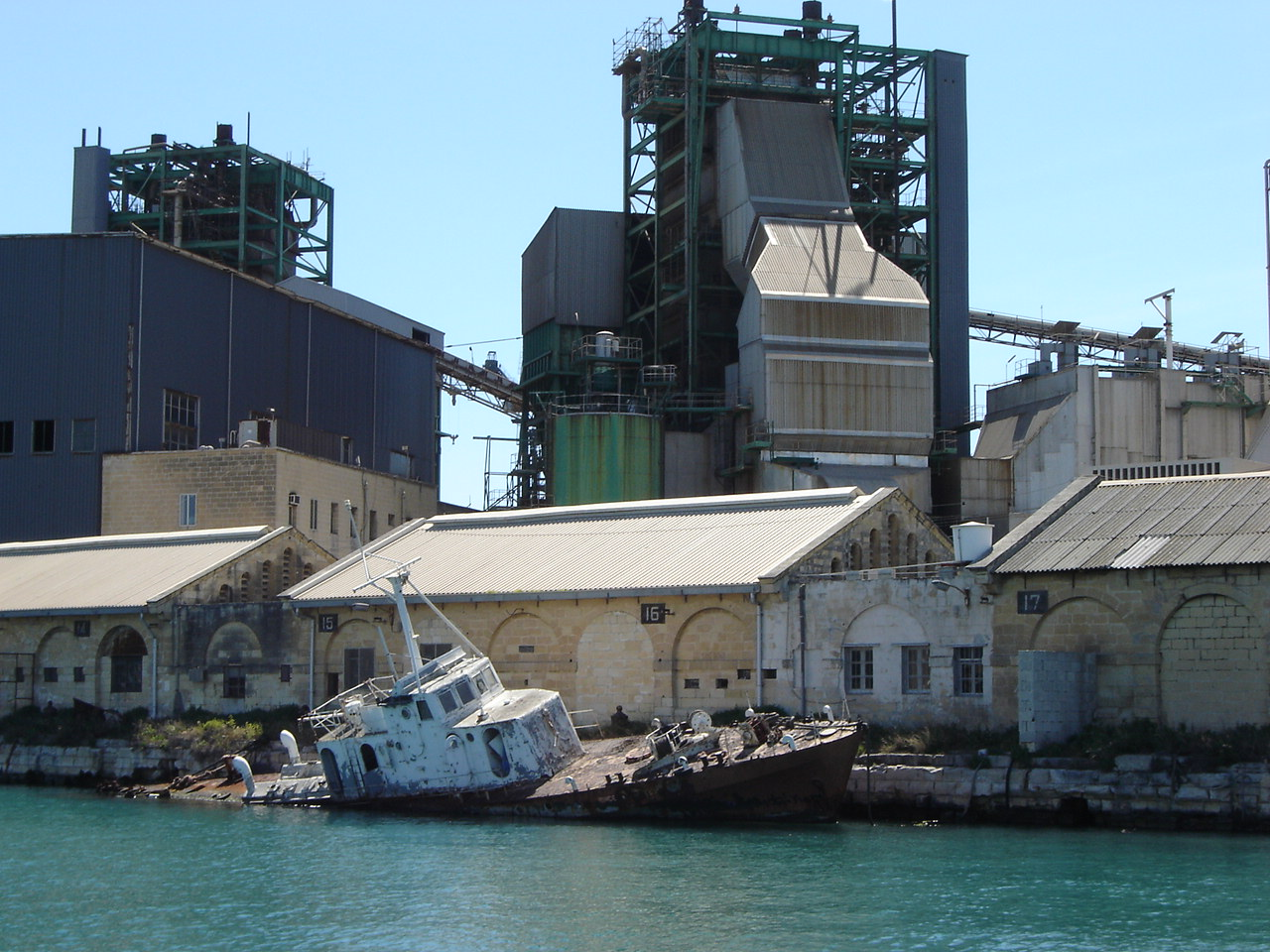
A decommissioned Maltese patrol boat laid up at Marsa in 2006. This was one of four boats donated by Libya to Malta in 1975–76.

During the Mintoff years following the independence of Malta, Libya had loaned several million dollars to Malta to make up for the loss of rental income which followed the closure of British military bases in Malta. These closer ties with Libya meant a dramatic new development in Maltese foreign policy: Western media reported that Malta appeared to be turning its back on NATO, the UK, and Europe generally. By at least the 1970s Libya already had a permanent embassy in Malta located at the prominent Villa Drago, in Sliema. The villa is also known as Dar Tarak or Dar Tarek, and is now a Grade 1 scheduled building.

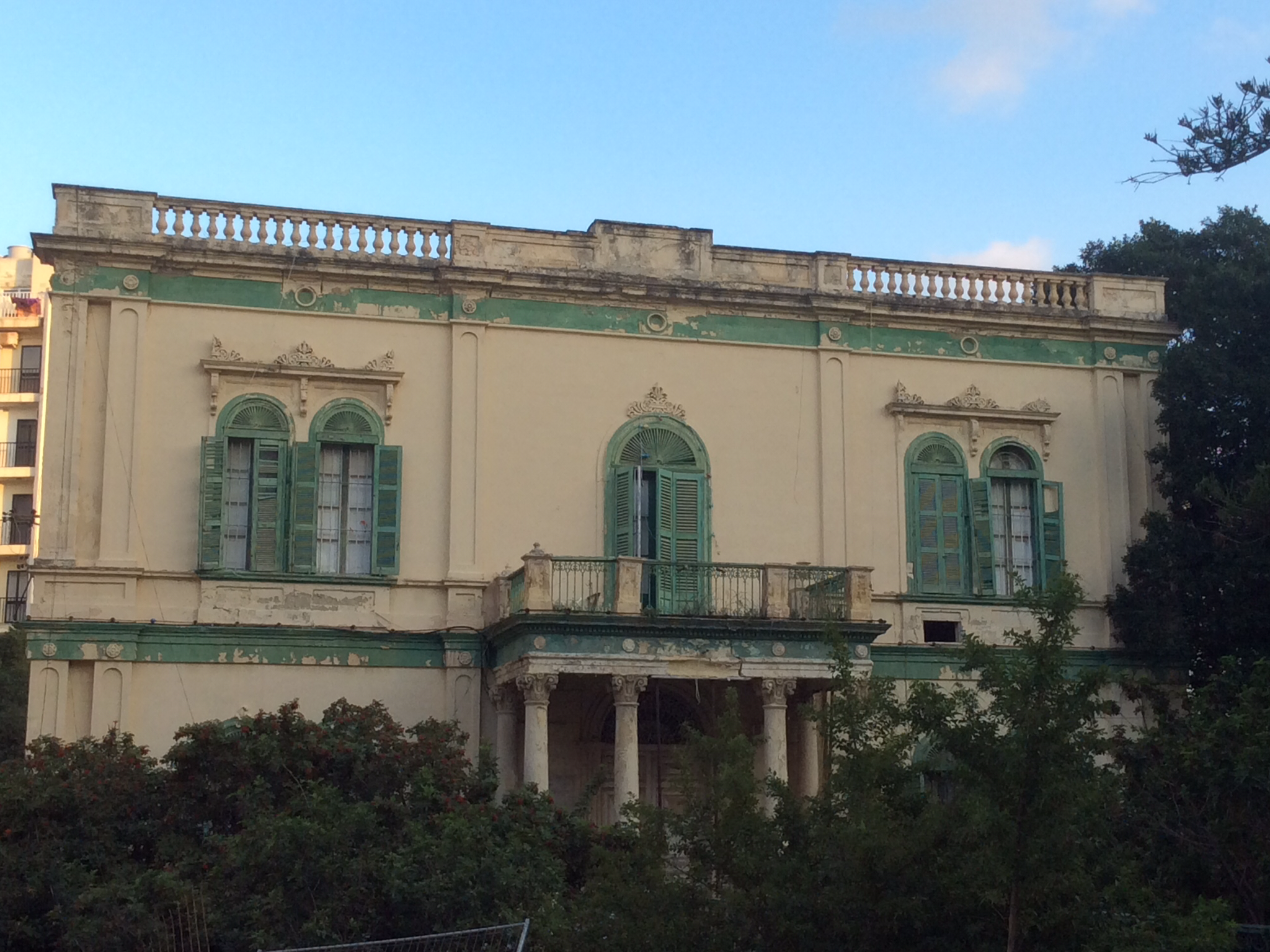
Villa Drago, in Sliema, housed the first Libyan embassy in Malta

History books were published that began to spread the idea of a disconnection between the Italian and Catholic populations, and instead tried to promote the theory of closer cultural and ethnic ties with North Africa. This new development was noted by Boissevain in 1991:

...the Labour government broke off relations with NATO and sought links with the Arab world. After 900 years of being linked to Europe, Malta began to look southward. Muslims, still remembered in folklore for savage pirate attacks, were redefined as blood brothers.

Gaddafi even claimed that the Maltese people were of Arab origin, through Phoenician descent.

Between 1975 and 1976, the Libyan government gave Malta's 1st (Maritime) Battery of the Malta Land Force (now the Maritime Squadron of the AFM) four patrol boats.

=== Saipem incident (1980) ===
In 1980, an oil rig of the Italian company Saipem commissioned by Texaco to drill on behalf of the Maltese government 68 nautical miles south-east of Malta had to stop operations after being threatened by a Libyan gunboat. Both Malta and Libya claimed economic rights to the area and this incident raised tensions. The matter was referred to the International Court of Justice in 1982 but the court's ruling in 1985 dealt only with the delineation of a small part of the contested territory.

=== Improving relations (1982–1987) ===
Malta and Libya had entered into a Friendship and Cooperation Treaty, in response to repeated overtures by Gaddafi for a closer, more formal union between the two countries; and, for a brief period, Arabic had become a compulsory subject in Maltese secondary schools. In 1984 the Mariam Al-Batool Mosque was officially opened by Muammar Gaddafi in Malta, two years after its completion.

=== Nationalist governments to Libyan Civil War (1987–2011) ===
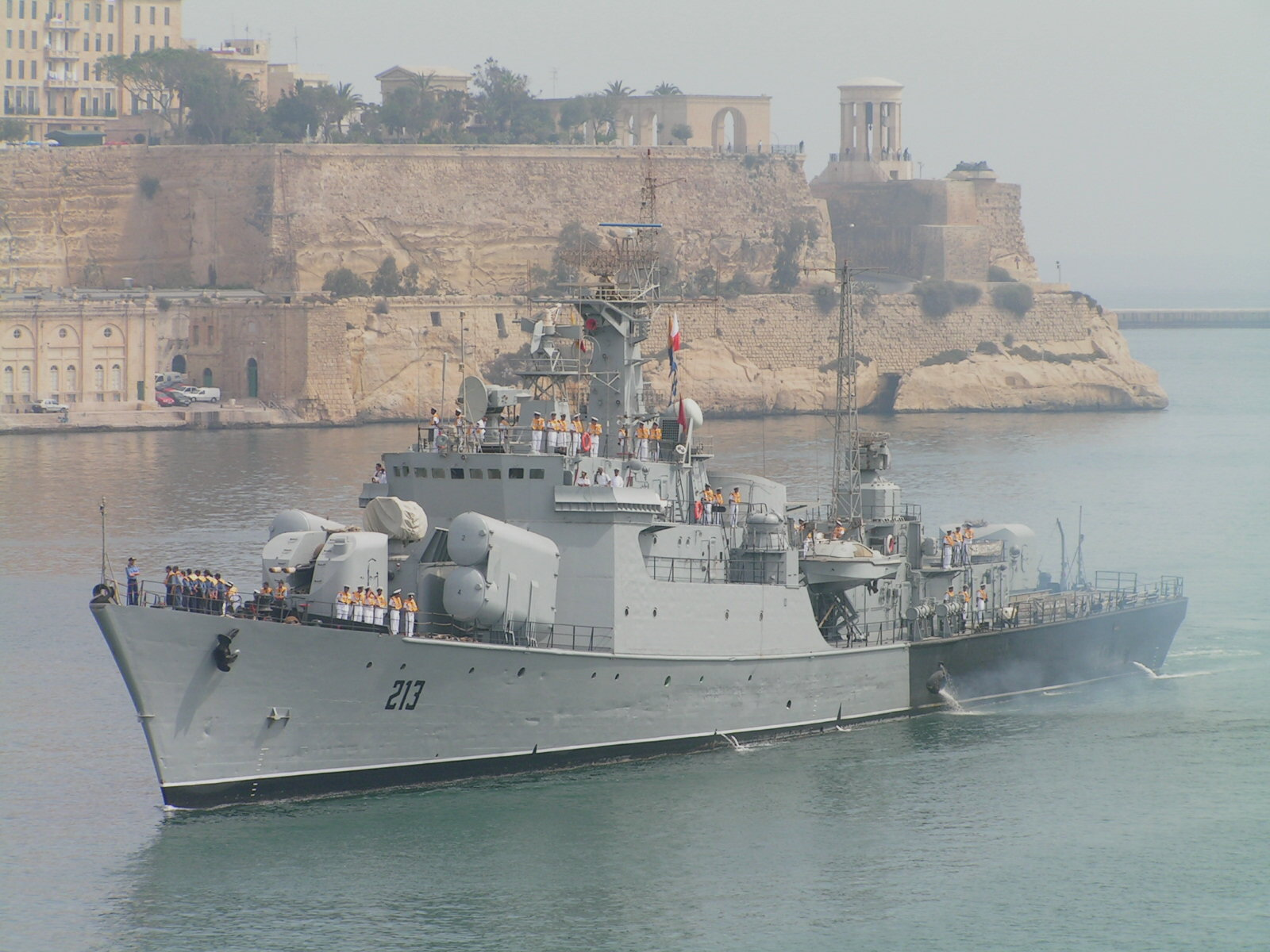
Libyan frigate Al Ghardabia at Grand Harbour, Malta in 2005

Following the termination of the Mintoff and Mifsud-Bonnici governments, Malta retained its excellent relations with Libya. Relations cooled in 2005 following the assassination in Malta of Fathi Shaqaqi, presumably by the Mossad, but relations were later normalised.

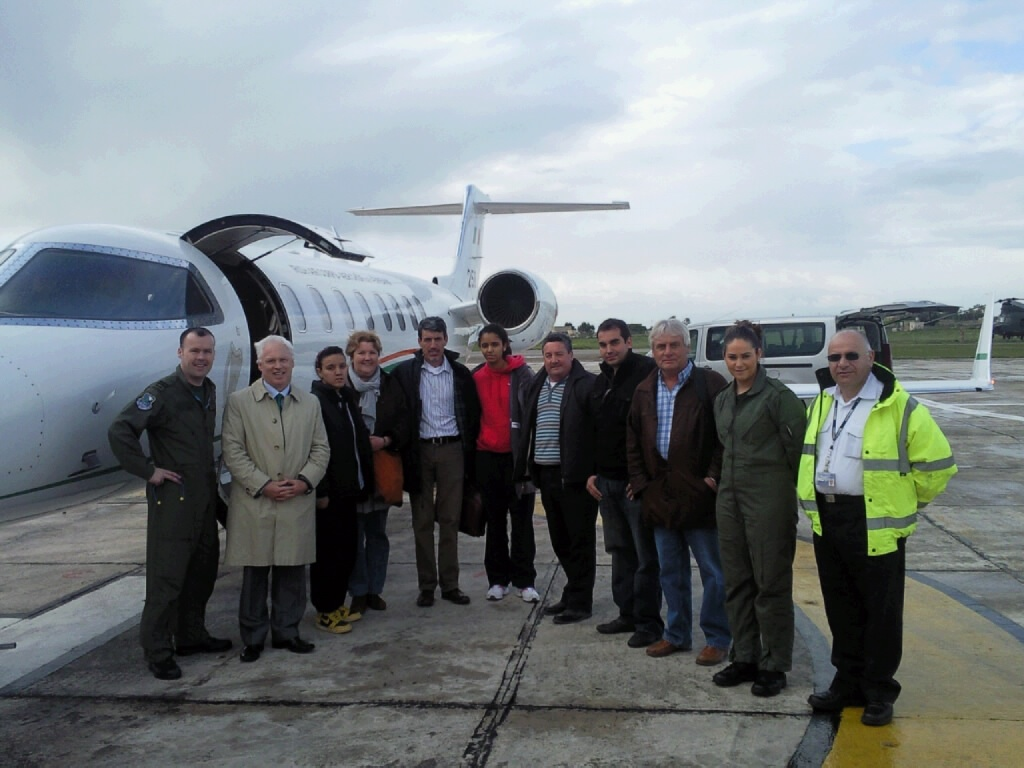
Irish citizens at Malta International Airport after being evacuated from Libya on 26 February 2011

On 21 February 2011, in the beginning of the first Libyan Civil War, two Libyan Air Force fighter jets defected to Malta instead of bombing protesters in Benghazi. The Maltese government's refusal to extradite the pilots or return the aircraft to Libya swiftly established the island state as an unfriendly neighbour of the Gaddafi government amidst the Libyan uprising. Malta also coordinated the evacuation of tens of thousands of foreign workers who got caught up in the conflict; and played a lesser role in the later international intervention in the conflict.

On 11 March, one of Gaddafi's cousins attempted to bribe Maltese Air Force officials in order to purchase jet fuel.

=== Post-Gaddafi era (2011–present) ===
Following the overthrow of Libya's Muammar Gaddafi, relations have continued to strengthen from both parts. The Maltese Government in collaboration with MCAST has offered scholarships to Libyan students. Discussions on Illegal Migrations also have been undergoing. In September 2013, a deal was struck for Malta to procure crude oil, refined oil, jet fuel and LPG at a fixed price. Some issue on and oil exploration area, claimed by both countries, have been discussed by both parties, agreeing for joint oil exploration by both countries. Malta will also help Libya in transport and civil aviation. The Libyan government was keen on improving links between the two countries including oil and gas, education, including a rehabilitation of the Ta' Giorni Institute, and other aspects.

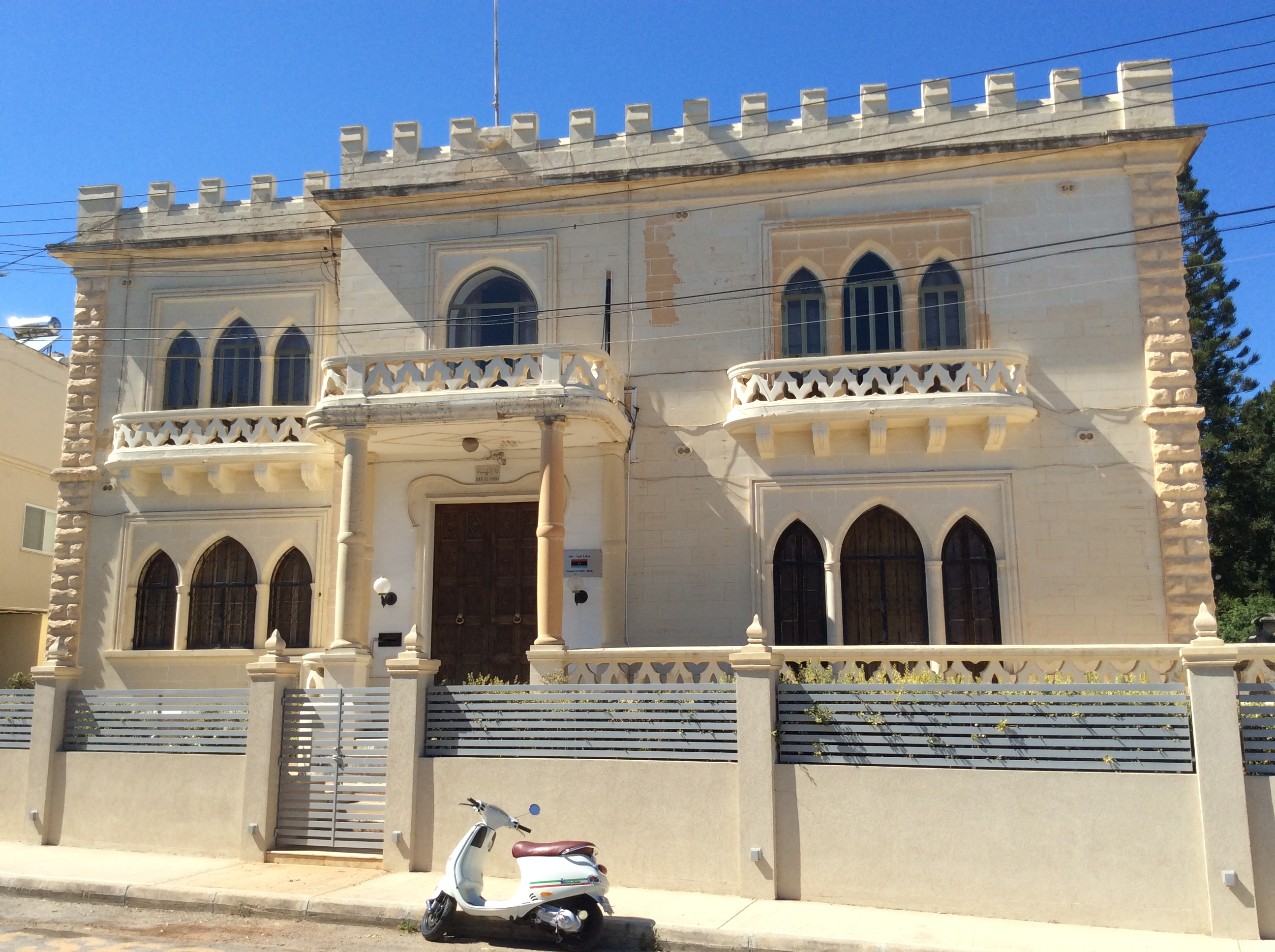
Dar El-Hana; Embassy of Libya in Balzan, Malta

During the second Libyan civil war, Malta (along with most of the international community) continued to recognize the Government of National Accord after it was declared unconstitutional by the Supreme Court of Libya. Libyan chargé d'affaires Hussin Musrati insisted that by doing so, Malta was "interfering in Libyan affairs". Due to the conflict, there are currently two Libyan embassies in Malta. The recognized General National Congress now controls the official Libyan Embassy in Balzan, while the unrecognized House of Representatives has opened a consulate in Ta' Xbiex. Each of the two embassies say that visas issued by the other entity are not valid.

On 27 January 2015, Islamic State militants attacked the Maltese-run Corinthia Hotel in Tripoli. Following further expansion of the Islamic State in Libya (particularly the fall of Nawfaliya), Prime Minister Joseph Muscat and Leader of the Opposition Simon Busuttil called for the United Nations and European Union to intervene in Libya to prevent the country from becoming a failed state.

A meeting between the leaders of the two rival governments of Libya was held at Auberge de Castille in Valletta, Malta on 16 December 2015. The meeting was delayed for a few days after the representatives from the Tobruk government initially failed to show up.

== See also ==
- Foreign relations of Libya
- Foreign relations of Malta
- Malta and the Non-Aligned Movement
  - 1984 Mediterranean Non-Aligned Countries Ministerial Meeting
