= Cyprus and the Non-Aligned Movement =

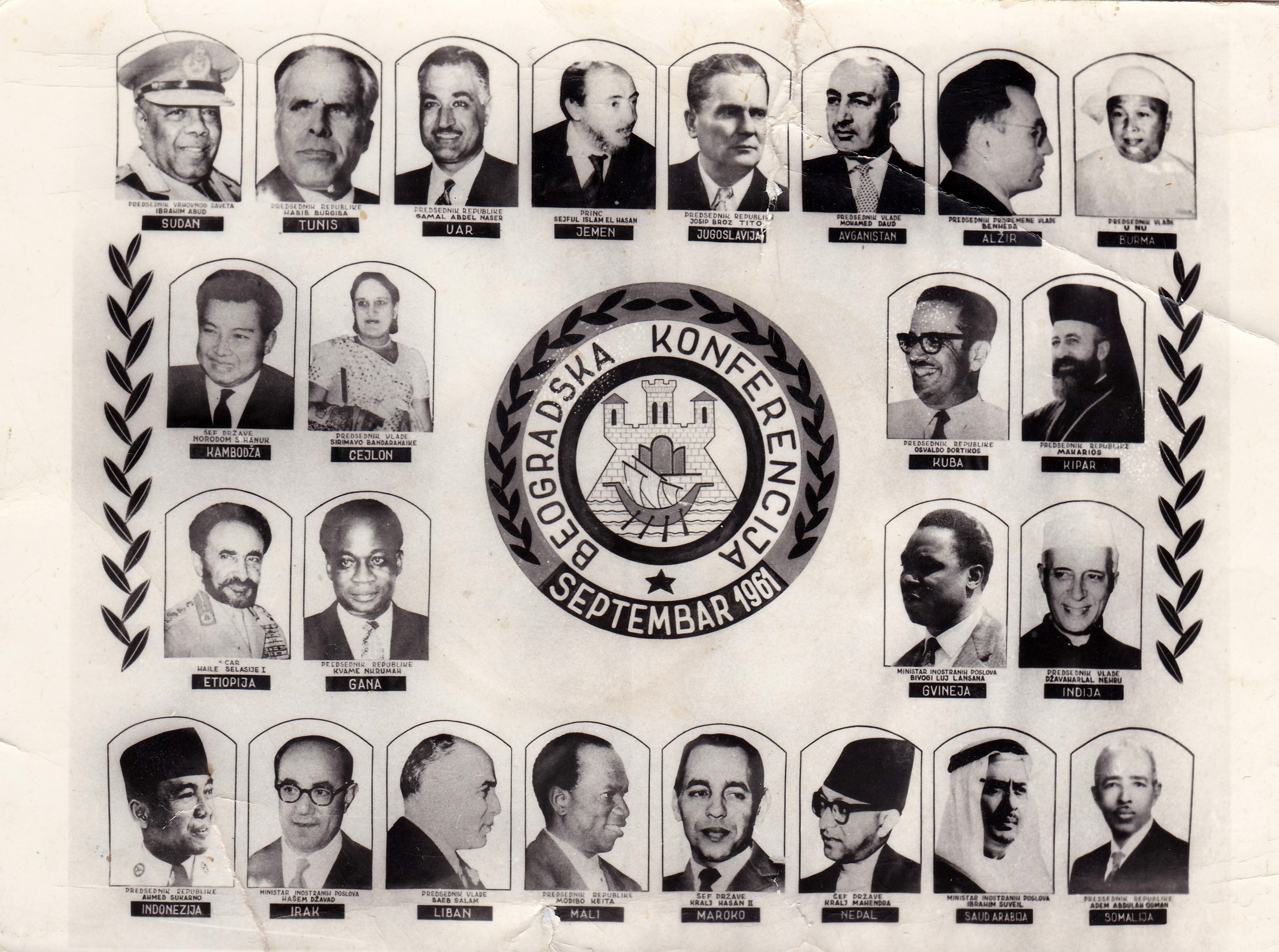
Image of Makarios III among participants of the 1st Summit of the Non-Aligned Movement

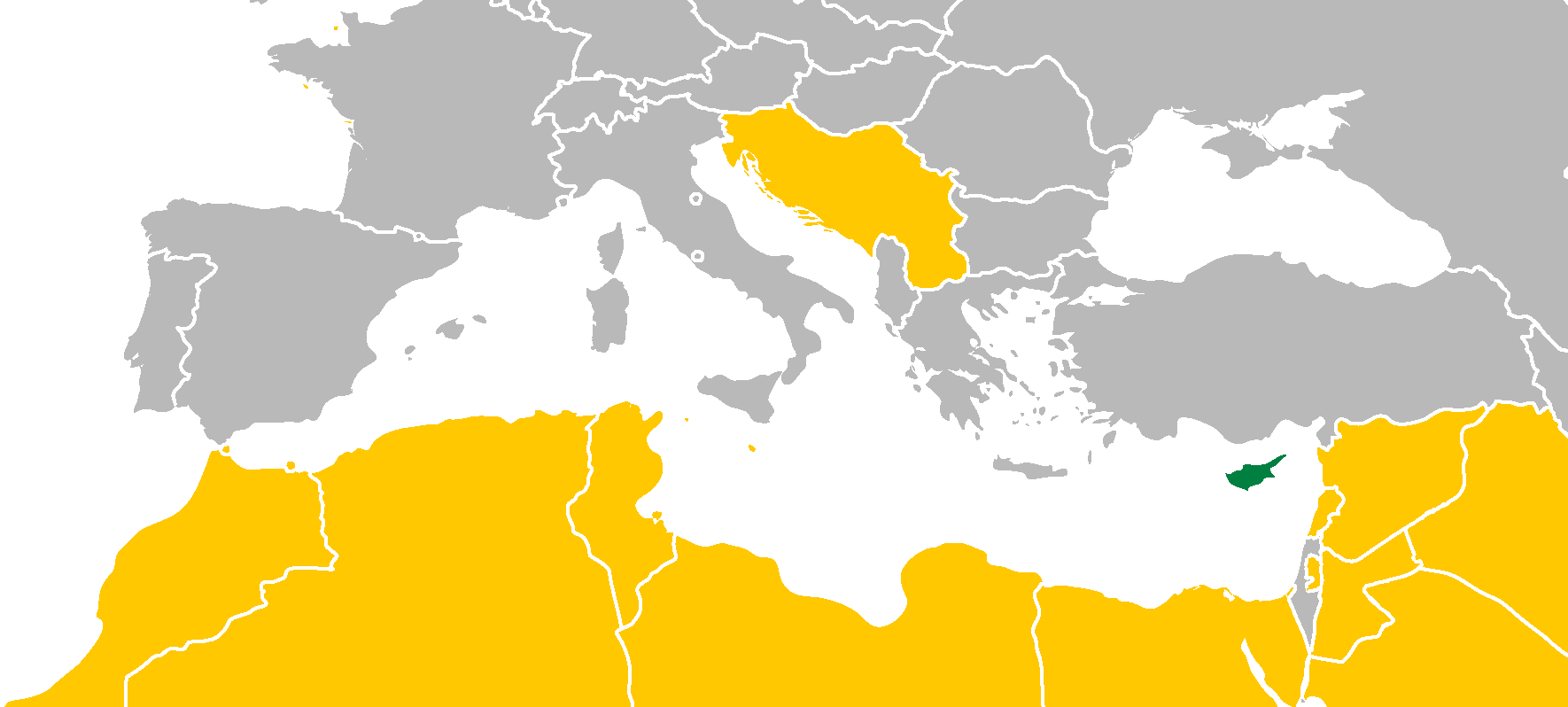
Mediterranean (Middle East, North African and European) member states of the Non-Aligned Movement (1983) with Cyprus in dark green.

The Mediterranean island country of Cyprus was one of the founding members of the Non-Aligned Movement with Makarios III attending the 1st Summit of the Non-Aligned Movement in Belgrade, SFR Yugoslavia in 1961, just one year after the Cypriot independence. Membership in the movement was perceived as one of two major foreign-policy alternatives with the first one being formal membership in NATO at least nominally supported by both Greece and Turkey in the initial period after the London and Zürich Agreements, and the second one being pro-Western participation in the Non-Aligned Movement. The United Kingdom and the United States preferred this second option at least until 1963.

Nicosia believed that the participation in the movement will help the country to convince numerous predominantly Muslim members of the NAM not to recognize or to establish relations with the Northern Cyprus. Membership in the movement helped the island in development of its relations with neighboring Middle East countries. In 1964 Makarios reassured Prime Minister of Greece Georgios Papandreou of Cypriot historical and cultural links to the west but stressed that the country will continue to pursue Non-Aligned foreign policy. On 18 December 1965 member states of the Non-Aligned Movement prepared a draft resolution at the UN General Assembly which called upon all the states "to respect the sovereignty, unity, independence and territorial integrity of the Republic of Cyprus". While Non-Aligned countries voted for the resolution, 54 states abstained and Turkey, United States, Iran, Pakistan and Albania voted against it. Greek Cypriot authorities believed that the Non-Aligned Movement may provide them with additional international support for constitutional changes and in their response to Cypriot intercommunal violence.

The country hosted the 1988 Non-Aligned Foreign Ministers Conference and was one of the members considered to host the 9th Summit of the Non-Aligned Movement.

One of the requirements of the 2004 enlargement of the European Union was for Cyprus to leave the Non-Aligned Movement yet the Government of Cyprus insisted that the country will nevertheless maintain close ties with the NAM.

== See also ==
- Yugoslavia and the Non-Aligned Movement
- Malta and the Non-Aligned Movement
- Egypt and the Non-Aligned Movement
- Cyprus–NATO relations
- Neutral and Non-Aligned European States
