= Neutral and Non-Aligned European States =

Political history of Austria

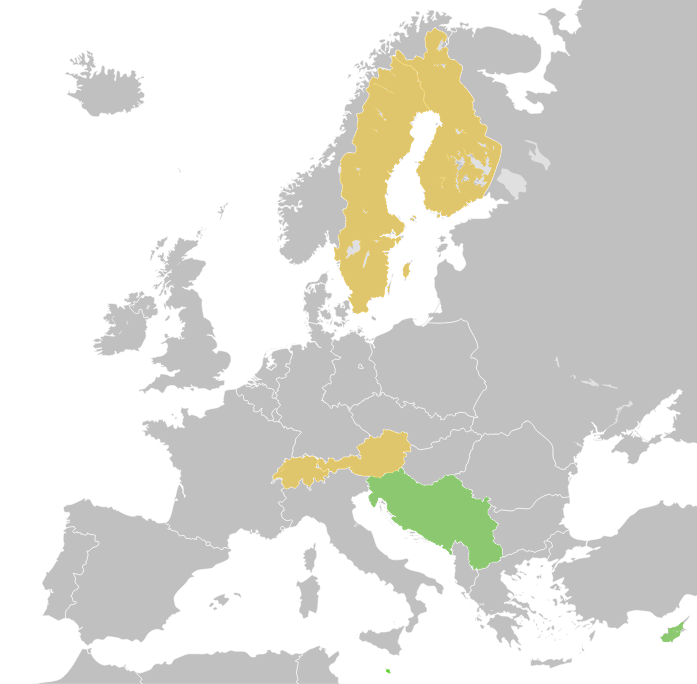
- Neutral and Non-Aligned European States
- Membership: Austria; Cyprus; Finland; Malta; Sweden; Switzerland; Yugoslavia

Area
  - Total: 1,176,407 km^{2} (454,213 sq mi)

Population
  - 1971 estimate: ~ 47,800,000

Neutral and Non-Aligned European States, sometimes known by abbreviation NN states, was a Cold War era informal grouping of states in Europe which were neither part of NATO nor Warsaw Pact but were either neutral or members of the Non-Aligned Movement. The group brought together neutral countries of Austria, Finland, Sweden and Switzerland on one, and non-aligned SFR Yugoslavia, Cyprus and Malta on the other hand, all of which together shared interest in preservation of their independent non-bloc position with regard to NATO, European Community, Warsaw Pact and the Council for Mutual Economic Assistance. Established and comparatively highly developed European neutral countries perceived cooperation with non-aligned countries (particularly with SFR Yugoslavia as one of the leaders of the group) as a way to advocate for peace, disarmament and superpowers' restraint more forcefully than their limited earlier cooperation would permit.

The group cooperated within the Conference on Security and Co-operation in Europe (CSCE) in trying to preserve the results of the Helsinki Accords. In this framework, Yugoslavia cooperated with Austria and Finland on mediation between blocs, organized a second CSCE summit in 1977 in Belgrade and proposed drafts on national minorities protection which are still valid and integral parts of OSCE provisions on minority rights.

== See also ==
- Declaration of Neutrality
  - Austria–NATO relations
- Finlandization
  - Finland–NATO relations
- Swedish neutrality
  - Sweden–NATO relations
- Swiss neutrality
  - Switzerland–NATO relations
- Yugoslavia and the Non-Aligned Movement
  - Balkan Pact
- Cyprus and the Non-Aligned Movement
  - Cyprus–NATO relations
- Malta and the Non-Aligned Movement
  - Malta–NATO relations
- European Union–NATO relations
- 1995 enlargement of the European Union
- 2004 enlargement of the European Union
- Neutral member states in the European Union
- Partnership for Peace
- European microstates
- Operation Gladio
