= Chris Pavlou (banker) =

Vice Chairman
- In office 2012–2013
- Preceded by: Neoclis Lysandrou

Personal details
- Born: Chris Pavlou; May 30, 1945 (age 81) Famagusta, Cyprus
- Party: No affiliation
- Profession: Banker

Chris Pavlou (born May 30, 1945) is an International banker and a business executive. He was the Vice-Chairman of Cyprus Popular Bank. He was in this position since September 17, 2012. On 28 March 2013 he resigned as Vice Chairman of Laiki Bank (Cyprus Popular Bank) but in April 2015 until December 2016 was appointed by the Central Bank of Cyprus in its capacity as resolution authority as Special Administrator of the legacy entity of Laiki Bank.

== Banking career ==
Pavlou joined Barclays, London, in 1966 where he gradually moved up to the position of Deputy Chief Manager. He later spent five years in New York City as Senior Vice President running Barclays Foreign Exchange and Money Markets in North America.

In February 1987 he joined the Hong Kong and Shanghai Banking Corporation Ltd. (HSBC) as Chief Treasury Manager responsible for all Treasury activities. Within five years the business was transformed into a market leader and profits increases tenfold.

In August 1992, he was appointed Treasurer of HSBC with responsibility for all treasury operations of Asia and Hang Seng Bank. He was a frequent visitor to the bank´s 20 treasury operations in Asia. By 1995, HSBC was recognized as the leading treasury Bank in Asia with the exception of Japan. In September 1995, he was posted to Tokyo as treasurer HSBC Midland in order to develop the Bank´s underperforming business there. Within three years the goals were achieved.

In 1998, he joined Laiki Bank (23% owned by HSBC) as a consultant and then as a member of its board.

In 2006, he joined TFI Markets, and under a successful three-year term he retired in October 2009. He remained as non-executive chairman until 2011.

== In the media ==
Chris Pavlou has been featured in BBC’s foreign exchange documentary Billion Dollar Day The currency trading documentary was created by the British Broadcasting Corporation on June, 4th 1985 and it features Pavlou as Head of Treasury at Barclays Bank in London. He has also been interviewed several times regarding the 2012–13 Cypriot financial crisis by Reuters, Cyprus Mail, Channel 4 and other media.

== Freedom of the City of London ==
He was awarded the famous Freedom of the City of London and thus enrolled in the usual ceremony in Guildhall, where he received a guide to conducting his life in an honourable fashion along with the sealed certificate.

== Affiliations ==
- Honorary member of the International Foreign Exchange Association
- Member of the Worshipful Company of International Bankers
- Non-Executive Director & member of the audit committee of National Bank of Greece
- Non-Executive Director & member of the audit committee of Temenos
- Non-Executive Director of Prosafe

Business positions
Preceded by Neoclis Lysandrou	Vice Chairman, Cyprus Popular Bank; 2012–2013	Succeeded by none
