= Panicos =

Panicos is a given name. Notable people with the given name include:

- Panicos Chrysanthou (born 1951), Cypriot filmmaker and documentarian
- Panicos O. Demetriades (born 1959), Cypriot economist
- Panicos Nicolaou, Cypriot banker
- Panicos Orphanides (born 1961), Cypriot footballer and manager
- Panicos Pounas (born 1969), Cypriot footballer
