= Sotos (surname) =

Sotos is both a surname and a given name. Notable people with the name include:

- Jim Sotos (fl. 1970s–1980s), American film director
- Peter Sotos (born 1960), American writer and musician
- Sotos Zackheos (born 1950/51), Cypriot diplomat
