= Currency of Cyprus =

The currency of Cyprus can refer to:

- Euro in the republic of Cyprus
- Cypriot Pound used until 2008
- Turkish lira in Turkish controlled Northern Cyprus
