= Hourican =

Hourican is an Irish surname. Notable people with the surname include:

- John Hourican (born 1970), Irish banker
- Liam Hourican, Irish actor
