= 2012 Malta Open darts =

Malta Open

Tournament information
- Dates: 13 November 2012
- Location: Buġibba
- Country: Malta
- Organisation(s): BDO, WDF, MDA
- Winner's share: €1,200

Champion(s)
- (Greece) John Michael

2012 Malta Open was a darts tournament part of the annual, Malta Open, which took place in Buġibba, Malta in 2012.

== Results ==
Round	Player
Winner	(Greece) John Michael
Final	(Germany) Klaus Rohlederer
Semi-finals	(Malta) Norbert Attard
Semi-finals	(England) Davy Dodds
Quarter-finals	(Sweden) Peter Sajwani
Quarter-finals	(England) Greg Upton
Quarter-finals	(England) Andy Keen
Quarter-finals	(England) Kelly Corcoran
Last 16	(Malta) Gordon Stanmore
Last 16	(England) Dave Irwin
Last 16	(Malta) John Ciantar
Last 16	(England) Surjan Kalyan
Last 16	(Scotland) David Burt
Last 16	(Italy) Danilo Vigato
Last 16	(England) Eddie Simmonds
Last 16	(Malta) Twanny Roberts
Last 32	(Germany) Andreas Krockel
Last 32	(Germany) Karsten Kornath
Last 32	(Germany) Colin Rice
Last 32	(Sweden) Johan Engstrom
Last 32	(Scotland) George McKendrick
Last 32	(Malta) Darren Camilleri
Last 32	(England) Mark Davis
Last 32	(Malta) Mario Camilleri
Last 32	(Malta) Godfrey Abela
Last 32	(England) Bob Foster
Last 32	(England) Jack Tweddell
Last 32	(Sweden) Dennis Nilsson
Last 32	(England) Mark Haggerty
Last 32	(Cyprus) Petros Christodoulou
Last 32	(England) Tony Keane
Last 32	(England) Charlie Johnstone
