= Central Bank of Cyprus =

Monetary Authority of Cyprus

Coordinates: 35°09′20″N 33°22′14″E

Central Bank of Cyprus Kεντρική Τράπεζα Κύπρου (in Greek) Kıbrıs Merkez Bankası (in Turkish)

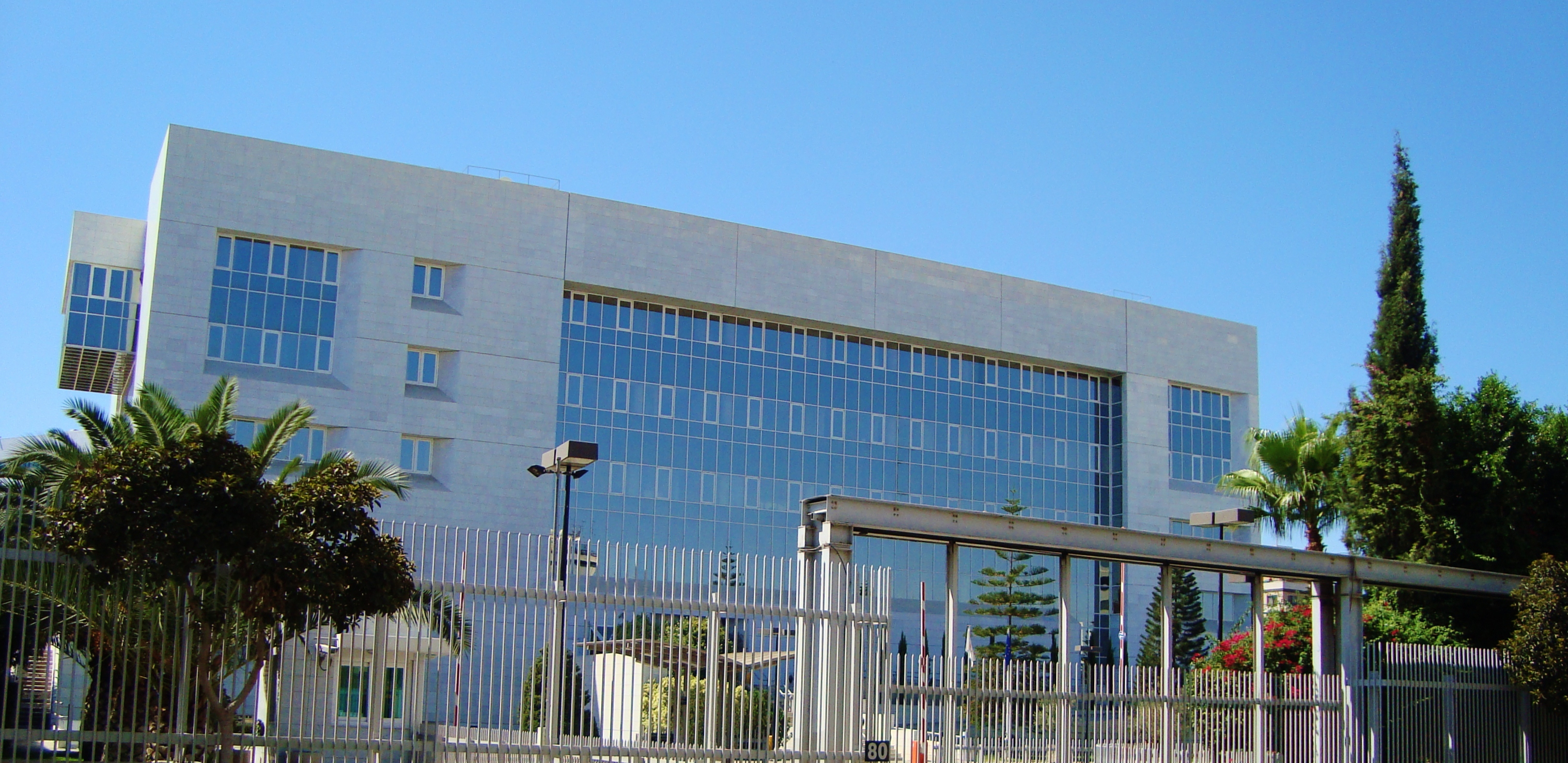
- Central bank of: Cyprus
- Headquarters: Nicosia
- Established: 14 December 1963
- Ownership: 100% state ownership
- Governor: Christodoulos Patsalides
- Reserves: 80 million USD
- Succeeded by: European Central Bank (2008)^{1}
- Website: centralbank.cy
- ^{1} The Central Bank of Cyprus still exists but many functions have been taken over by the ECB.

The Central Bank of Cyprus (Greek: Kεντρική Τράπεζα της Κύπρου Turkish: Kıbrıs Merkez Bankası) is the national central bank for the Republic of Cyprus within the Eurosystem. It was the Cypriot central bank from 1963 to 2007, issuing the Cypriot pound.

In addition to its monetary role, the CBC is also a financial supervisory authority. In that capacity, it increasingly implements policies set at the European Union level. It is the national competent authority for Cyprus within European Banking Supervision. It is a voting member of the Board of Supervisors of the European Banking Authority (EBA). It is the designated Cypriot National Resolution Authority and plenary session member of the Single Resolution Board (SRB). It provides the permanent single common representative for Cyprus in the Supervisory composition of the General Board of the Anti-Money Laundering Authority (AMLA). It is also a member of the European Systemic Risk Board (ESRB).

== History ==
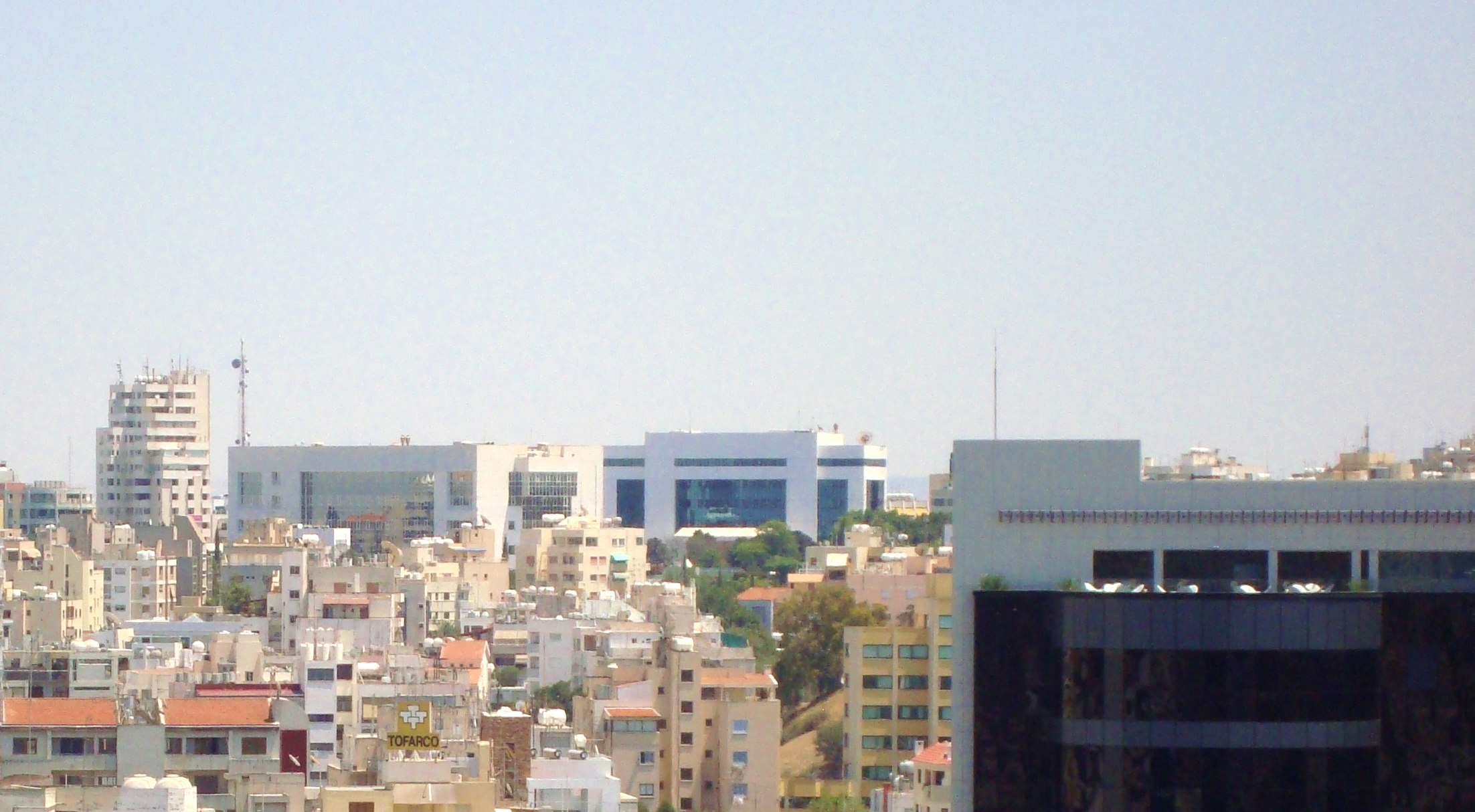
Central bank with Nicosia skyline

The Central Bank of Cyprus has its origins in the British Colonial Government of Cyprus, which established a Cyprus Currency Board in 1927. This followed on from the unilateral annexation of Cyprus by the British Empire in 1914, the Treaty of Lausanne, establishing the legality in international law of this British takeover, in 1923, and the full establishment of a colonial system of government in Cyprus, with the creation of a Legislative Council, in 1926.

The role of the Chairman of the Currency Board was held by the Accountant General, also known as the Auditor General, of the Government of Cyprus. The Board could issue notes and coins, initially denominated in the Cypriot pound, shillings and piastres, and later, following decimalization, in Cyprus pounds and mils. However, the local currency was pegged at one Cyprus pound to one pound sterling meaning ultimate fiscal control still rested with the Bank of England in London and the Government of the United Kingdom. This link was maintained by the requirement that for every Cyprus pound issued by the Currency Board in Cyprus, one pound sterling issued by the Bank of England had to be deposited by the Government of Cyprus with the Crown Agents in London.

With independence from Britain in 1960, Article 118 of the Constitution of the Republic of Cyprus, which came into force on the island on 1 April 1960, gave the President and Vice-President of Cyprus the right to establish a new central bank, called in the Constitution the 'Issuing Bank' and appoint its Governor. Article 119 sets out the responsibilities of the Governor and the Issuing Bank, Article 120 states that the Governor of the Issuing Bank shall abide by future relevant laws enacted by the Republic of Cyprus, and Article 121 gives the Government of the Republic of Cyprus the right to convert the Issuing Bank into a Central Bank if it wishes. In effect, the Issuing Bank was a continuation of the former colonial Currency Board within the framework of the Constitution of the new Republic, but the Constitution gave the right to the Republic to convert it into a Central Bank if it chose to do so. A decision to do this was taken in 1963, and the Issuing Bank was replaced that year by the Central Bank of Cyprus.

Following the accession of the Republic of Cyprus to the European Union in 2004, the Central Bank of Cyprus became a member of the Eurozone group of central banks in 2008, when the island converted from using the Cyprus pound to the euro currency.

The Central Bank of Cyprus is responsible for supervising financial institutions in Cyprus, with the exception of significant supervised entities which are supervised by the European Central Bank. As of April 2022 there were three banks deemed significant, Bank of Cyprus Holdings PCL, Hellenic Bank PCL and RCB Bank. RCB Bank had its licence withdrawn in December 2022.

== Role of the Governor of the Central Bank of Cyprus ==
The Governor of the Central Bank of Cyprus is the highest official in the Central Bank of Cyprus and is appointed by the President of the Republic. The position was established in 1963 when the Central Bank of Cyprus was established. The convention is for the Governor to serve a term of five years, but this is renewable.

The Governor has the responsibility of chairing the meetings of the Central Bank's Governing Council and Board of Directors and is a member of the Governing Board of the European Central Bank. The Governor had the responsibility for setting the Central Bank's policy in relation to the Cypriot economy, but this responsibility passed to the President of the European Central Bank on 1 January 2008, which is also the date that Cyprus changed over to the euro from the Cypriot pound.

== List of the Central Bank of Cyprus Governors ==
N.º	Name	Mandat
1	Charis Gavrielides	July 1963 – October 1965
2	Christakis Stephani	October 1965 – April 1982
3	Afxentis Afxentiou	May 1982 – April 2002
4	Christodoulos Christodoulou	May 2002 – May 2007
5	Athanasios Orphanides	May 2007 – May 2012
6	Panicos O. Demetriades	May 2012 – April 2014
7	Chrystalla Georghadji	April 2014 – April 2019
8	Constantinos Herodotou	April 2019 – April 2024
9	Christodoulos Patsalides	Since April 2024

== See also ==
- Cypriot pound
- Economy of Cyprus
- List of banks in Cyprus
- List of central banks
- List of financial supervisory authorities by country
