= Hellenic Bank =

Cypriot bank

Hellenic Bank Public Company Ltd
- Native name: Ελληνική Τράπεζα Δημόσια Εταιρεία Λτδ
- Type: Public
- Traded as: CSE: HB
- Industry: Banking, financial services
- Founded: 1976; 50 years ago
- Headquarters: Nicosia, Cyprus
- Number of locations: 53 branches (Q4 2023)
- Area served: Republic of Cyprus
- Key people: Petros Christodoulou (Chairman); Michalis Louis (CEO)
- Revenue: €680.3 million (2023)
- Operating income: €405.2 million (2023)
- Net income: €365.4 million (2023)
- Total assets: €20.1 billion (2023)
- Total equity: €1.506 billion (2023)
- Owner: Eurobank (100%)
- Number of employees: 2,255 (Q1 2024)
- Subsidiaries: Pancyprian Insurance, Hellenic Life, CNP Asfalistiki
- Capital ratio: Capital Ratio: 22.8% fully loaded CET1 (2023)
- Website: www.hellenicbank.com

Hellenic Bank Public Company Ltd (Greek: Ελληνική Τράπεζα Δημόσια Εταιρία Λτδ; CSE: HB) was a bank in Cyprus. It has been designated as a Significant Institution since the entry into force of European Banking Supervision in late 2014, and as a consequence is directly supervised by the European Central Bank.

== History ==
The bank was founded in 1976 with technical assistance from Bank of America and in 1996 it bought the local operations of Barclays Bank. A major shareholder (29%) was traditionally and for many years, the Church of Cyprus. Between November 2013 and December 2014, the Church's shareholding shrank to 0.3% making it a small shareholder, after Greek bank Eurobank Ergasias holding 68.81% and Cyprus based Demetra Holdings Plc with 21%, (Logicom Plc the owner of Demetra Holdings Plc also holds c 4% direct shareholding in the bank). The board is composed of representatives of the top two shareholders.

In January 2011, Hellenic Bank started operating in Russia but later, in 2014, sold the Russian operation The bank also had representative offices in Kyiv (Ukraine), St Petersburg and Moscow (Russia) as well as South Africa but later shut them down. It was also opening a representative office in Athens, Greece in 2017.

On 25 March 2013 Hellenic Bank sold its Greek branches to Piraeus Bank. As of 27 March 2013, former Hellenic Bank customers could use the ATMs of all Piraeus Bank Group banks (Piraeus Bank & ATEbank, Geniki Bank and former Bank of Cyprus and CPB Bank networks) free of charge. The process of merging the operations of the former Hellenic Bank network in Greece into Piraeus Bank was completed in mid-July 2013. This was followed by the closure of the vast majority of the former Hellenic Bank branches and the dismissal of its personnel.

In 2015 EBRD acquired a 5.4% share in Hellenic Bank.

In 2016, Hellenic Bank received a Global Finance Magazine award for the third consecutive year as the Best Digital Bank in Cyprus and was upgraded to B rating by Fitch.

In July 2017, Hellenic Bank sold 51% of its Arrears Management Division (2.3bn Euro in Non Performing Exposures and 150mn Euro in property), including its Debt Recovery Unit and Property Management Unit to Czech specialised firm APS Holdings a.s and created a new company in which it is a minority 49% shareholder: APS Debt Servicing Cyprus Ltd. 129 Hellenic Bank employees will move to the new company.

In July 2018, Hellenic Bank purchased the performing loans and deposits of the Cyprus Cooperative Bank, including 75 branches and 1,100 staff, raising €150mn in new capital and making it the second largest Cypriot Bank with a 31% share of the Cypriot deposit market and 20% of the loans market. Youssef Nasr became chairman of the board of Directors.

In August 2019, Evripides Polycarpou became chairman of the board of Directors. In July 2021 German Oliver Gatzke became CEO.

On the 30th of November 2022, Wargaming Group Limited announced that it reached an agreement to sell a holding of 13.41% (55,337,721 Shares) of Hellenic Bank Public Company Ltd to Eurobank for a consideration of €70 million. If the agreement goes through by the supervisory authorities in Frankfurt, Eurobank will be the major shareholder of the bank with a 26.1% ownership.

Early in January 2023, Eurobank announced the acquisition of a 3.2% holding (13,230,000 shares) in Hellenic Bank Public Company Limited from funds managed by Senvest Management LLC, for a consideration of €16.74m, therefore increasing the total holding to 29.2%.

The Bank's NPLs dropped after the completion of Starlight Project. The project was a transaction package that included the securitization of NPLs amounting to approximately €1.4 billion (Starlight Portfolio) on December 31, 2022, and the sale of the Bank's platform, APS Debt Servicer. APS was sold to Themis Portfolio Management Ltd, an indirect subsidiary of Oxalis Holding S.A.R.L., which is managed and advised by PIMCO. The Bank's NPL Ratio, excluding NPLs covered by the Asset Protection Program (APP) dropped to 3.6% from 13.5%. In June 2023 Christos Themistocleous became interim chairman. In August 2023 Antonis Rouvas became interim CEO. In January 2024 Greek banker Petros Christodoulou was approved by the European Central Bank as Chairman. Christos Themistocleous returned to the Vice Chairman role. In September 2024 Michalis Louis became CEO.

In September 2024, Eurobank acquired a 26.1% stake in Hellenic Bank, thus increasing its share in Hellenic Bank to 55.9%. On 7 November 2024, Eurobank further increased its stake in Hellenic Bank to 68.81% of the shares and launched a full bid on Hellenic. On 11 February 2025, Eurobank'stake in Hellenic Bank reached 93.47% of the shares and Eurobank launched a mandatory public offer to acquire the remaining shares of Hellenic Bank. After obtaining the full ownership of Hellenic Bank, Eurobank Ergasias initiated a merger of Hellenic Bank with its Cypriot subsidiary (Eurobank Cyprus), that was finalised on 1 September 2025 and discontinued the 'Hellenic Bank' brand.

== See also ==
- 2012–2013 Cypriot financial crisis
- List of banks in Cyprus
