= List of banks in Cyprus =

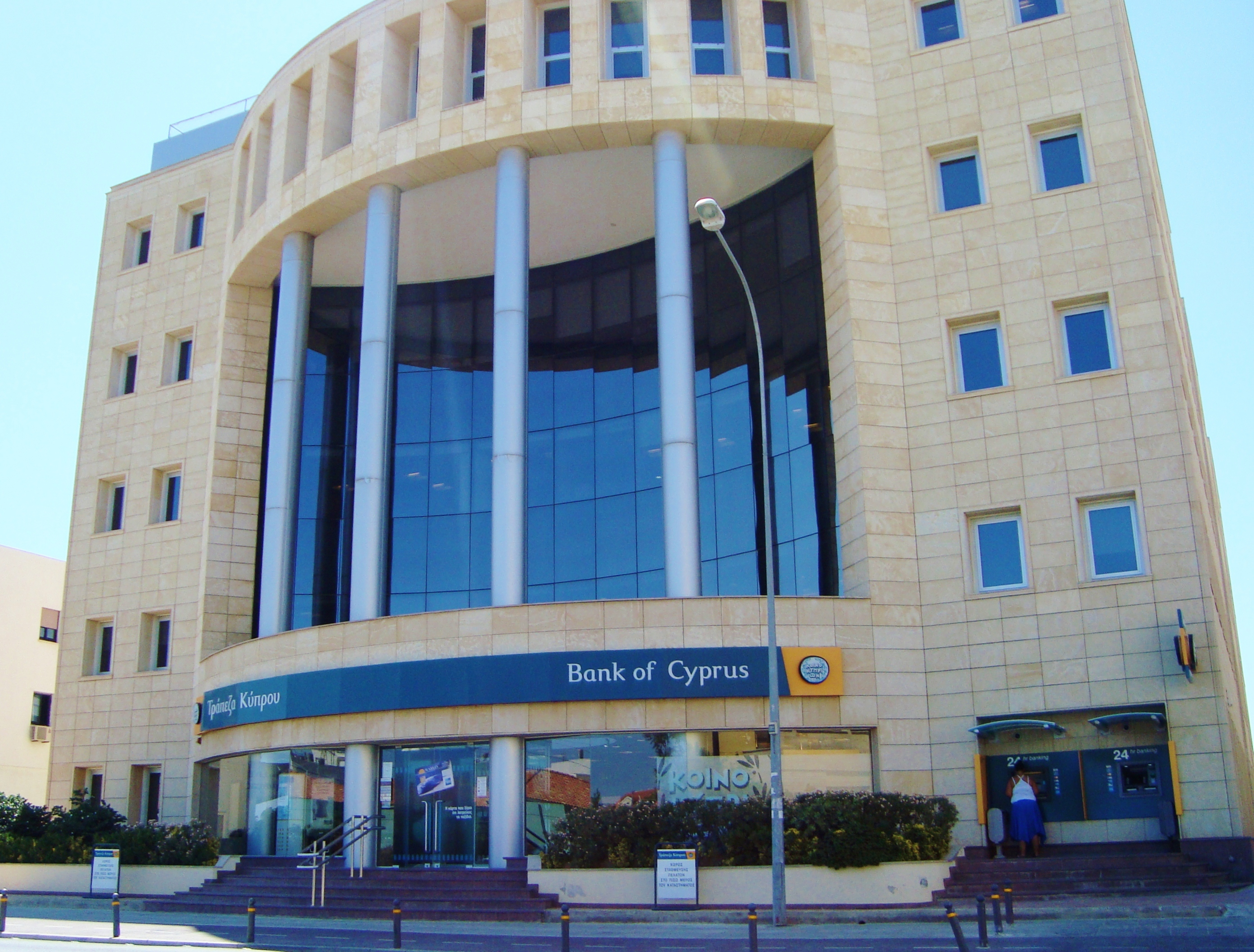
Office building of Bank of Cyprus in Nicosia

The following list of banks in Cyprus is to be understood within the framework of the European single market and European banking union, which means that the banking system of the Republic of Cyprus is more open to cross-border banking operations than peers outside of the EU. The list leaves aside the country's National Central Bank, the Central Bank of Cyprus, within the Eurosystem.

== Policy framework ==
European banking supervision distinguishes between significant institutions (SIs) and less significant institutions (LSIs), with SI/LSI designations updated regularly by the European Central Bank (ECB). Significant institutions are directly supervised by the ECB using joint supervisory teams that involve the national competent authorities (NCAs) of individual participating countries. Less significant institutions are supervised by the relevant NCA on a day-to-day basis, under the supervisory oversight of the ECB. In the case of Cyprus, the NCA is the Central Bank of Cyprus.

== Significant institutions ==
As of 1 September 2025, Bank of Cyprus was the only Cypriot banking group included in the list of significant institutions maintained by the ECB.

Three Greek SI banking groups also have operations in Cyprus: Alpha Bank, Eurobank Ergasias, and National Bank of Greece. A study published in 2024 estimated that, following its acquisition of Hellenic Bank, Eurobank Ergasias had Cypriot assets of the same order of magnitude as Bank of Cyprus.

Separately, AikGroup (Cyprus) Ltd, a Cypriot-based holding entity, is designated by the ECB as the consolidated entity of a Slovene SI that also includes Gorenjska Banka.

== Less significant institutions ==
As of 1 September 2025, the ECB's list of supervised institutions included six Cypriot LSIs, three of which were designated by the ECB as "high-impact" on the basis of several criteria including size:

- Ancoria Investments, a financial holding company
- Astrobank, subsequently acquired by Greece's Alpha Bank
- Housing Finance Corporation, a state-owned bank

The three other Cypriot LSIs were:

- Ancoria Bank, subsidiary of Ancoria Investments
- Société Générale Bank Cyprus Ltd, subsidiary of Société Générale de Banque au Liban
- Cyprus Development Bank, a public development bank

== Third-country branches ==
As of 13 October 2025, the following banking groups established outside the European Economic Area had branches in Cyprus:

- Arab Jordan Investment Bank
- Jordan Ahli Bank
- Jordan Kuwait Bank
- (Ukraine) PrivatBank

== Defunct banks ==
A number of former Cypriot banks, defined as having been headquartered in the present-day territory of Cyprus, are documented on Wikipedia. They are listed below in chronological order of Cypriot establishment.

- Cyprus Popular Bank (1901-2013)
- Cyprus Cooperative Central Bank (1937-2018)
- Hellenic Bank (1976-2025)
- RCB Bank (1995-2022)

The Ottoman Bank deserves mention as having been the first modern bank established on the island, present there for nearly a century from 1864 to 1963.

== See also ==
- List of banks in the Turkish Republic of Northern Cyprus
- List of banks in the euro area
- List of banks in Europe
