= List of banks in the Turkish Republic of Northern Cyprus =

This is a list of banks operating in Turkish Republic of Northern Cyprus.

All banks, including branches of foreign banks, private banks and International Banking Units are governed by the established Central Bank of Turkish Republic of Northern Cyprus. This organization audits and controls all these banks under international banking laws. All banks are compliant to strictly follow KYC and AML laws, are regulated by Ministry of Economy and Energy, and are supervised by the Central Bank.

== International Banking Units (I.B.U.) ==
- Fortress Bank

- Fortress Bank license has been revoked in 2021

You can reach the official website of TRNC Central Bank

http://www.mb.gov.ct.tr/sites/default/files/fortress%20Bank%20IBU%20Ltd.pdf

== Public banks ==
- Cyprus Vakiflar Bank

== Private banks ==
- Akfinans Bank
- Artam Bank
- Asbank
- Creditwest Bank
- Cyprus Turkish Cooperative Central Bank
- Denizbank Ltd.
- Kıbrıs Continental Bank
- Kıbrıs İktisat Bankası
- Limassol Turkish Cooperative Bank
- Near East Bank
- Şekerbank (Kıbrıs)
- Turkish Bank
- Universal Bank (TRNC)
- Viyabank
- Yeşilada Bank
- Nova Bank

== Branches of foreign banks ==
- Garanti Bankası
- Halkbank
- Oyak Bank
- Türk Ekonomi Bankası
- Türkiye İş Bankası
- Ziraat Bankası

== Development and investment banks ==
- Development Bank of the TRNC

== Banks under Savings Deposit Insurance Fund (S.D.I.F.) ==
- Asia Bank
- Cyprus Commercial Bank
- Erbank
- Industrial Bank of Kıbrıs
- Rumeli Bank
- Tilmo Bank
- Yasa Bank

== Defunct banks ==
- Cyprus Commercial Bank – transferred to the SDIF in 2001
- Cyprus Credit Bank – closed in 2000

Cyprus Eurobank

- Cyprus Liberal Bank – closed in 2000
- Everest Bank – closed in 2000
- Finba Financial Bank – renamed Artam Bank in 2001
- Hamza Bank – takeover by Seker Bank in 2002
- Industrial Bank – transferred to the SDIF in 2002
- Kıbrıs Finance Bank – closed in 2000
- Kıbrıs Yurt Bank – closed in 2000
- Med Bank – renamed Seker Bank in 2001
- Mediterranean Guarantee Bank – transferred to Cyprus Vakıflar Bank on July 28, 2005

== See also ==
- Central Bank of the Turkish Republic of Northern Cyprus
- List of banks in Cyprus
- List of banks in Europe
