= Panicos Nicolaou =

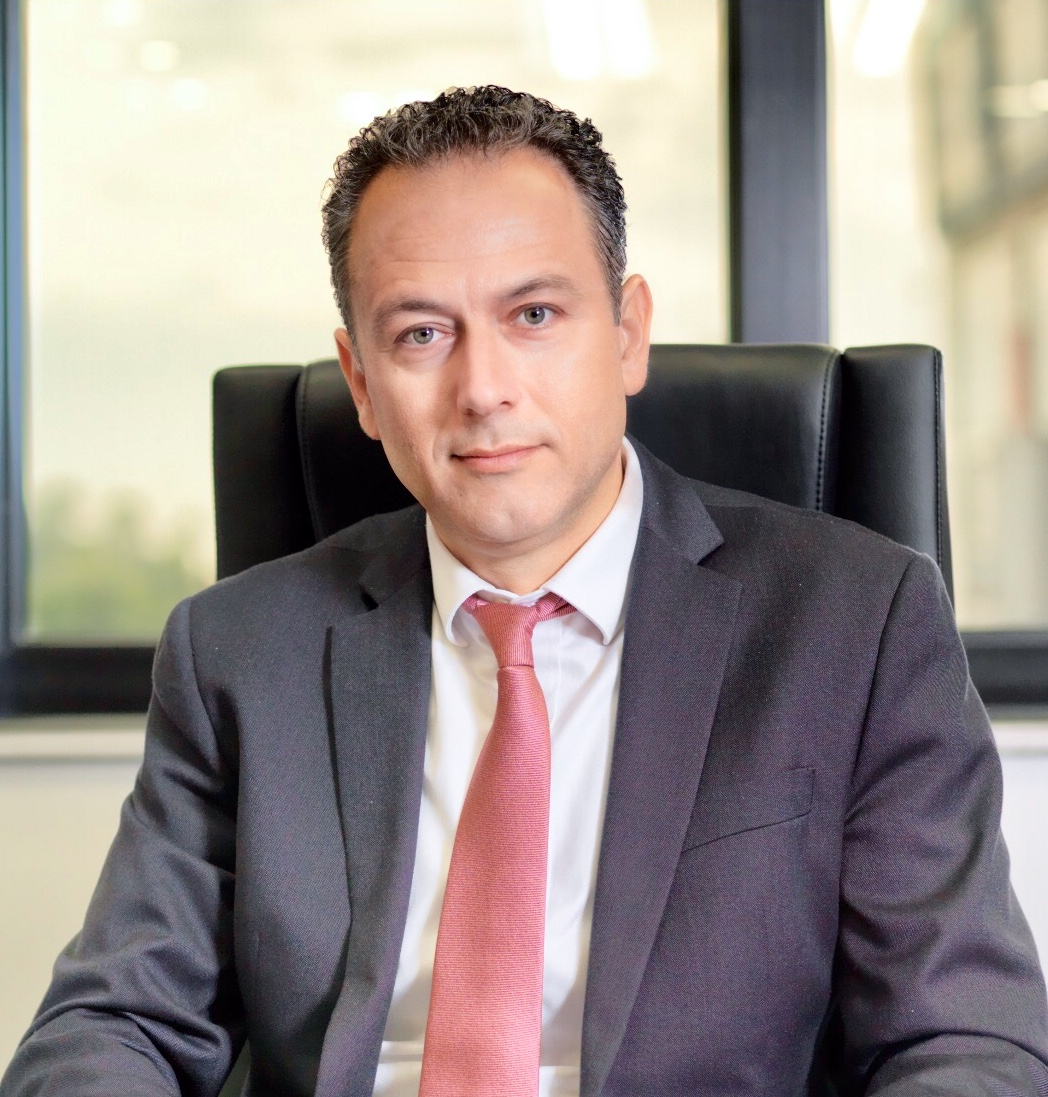
- Education: School of Management, UMIST; National Technical University of Athens; University of Illinois at Urbana–Champaign
- Occupation: Banker
- Title: CEO, Bank of Cyprus
- Term: September 2019-
- Predecessor: John Hourican

Panicos Nicolaou is a Cypriot banker, who has been the chief executive officer (CEO) of Cyprus’ biggest bank, the Bank of Cyprus, since 2019.

== Background ==
He holds an MSc in Mechanical & Industrial engineering from the University of Illinois at Urbana-Champaign, US, and a BSc in mechanical engineering from the National Technical University of Athens (Metsovio). He also holds a BSc in financial services from the School of Management of The University of Manchester Institute of Science and Technology (UMIST), UK.

== Career ==
Nicolaou joined the bank in 2001, mainly holding positions within the corporate banking division. He served as client relations officer and then as manager of the restructuring and recoveries division. In June 2016, he was promoted to director of corporate banking, and was also appointed as a member of the bank's board of directors.

He was responsible for the supervision of the bank's corporate banking centres throughout Cyprus, the international corporate banking centre, and international operations, as well as the bank's factoring unit. Under his supervision, the bank's corporate banking division served over 2,500 corporate clients across key sectors of the economy.

He has been Bank Cyprus’ CEO since 2019, succeeding John Patrick Hourican, while he is an executive member of the bank's board of directors. Thanks to the bank's positive performance during his time as CEO, the board of directors decided to extend his term until December 2028, ensuring continued leadership stability for the bank. The decision followed the announcement of the bank's strong financial results, with a profit of €401 million for the first nine months of 2024, marking one of the institution's most successful periods in recent years. At the same time, the bank return to meaningful dividend payments to its shareholders. For 2024, the bank has announced its intention for a 50% payout ratio. Additionally, the bank expects to achieve mid-teens ROTE over the medium term on normalized rates at 2%-2.5%. These results underscore Nicolaou's effective strategic direction, including cost optimization and risk management efforts.

== Bank of Cyprus term ==
Bank of Cyprus achieved positive results with Panicos Nicolaou at its helm. Most importantly, during his term, the quality of the bank's balance sheet improved due to several NPL portfolio sales, while its operating costs were reduced via a number of Voluntary Departure Schemes. Moreover, the bank managed to effectively handle the impact of the pandemic and completed its transition into the digital era.

In September 2024, under Nicolaou's stewardship, the Bank of Cyprus marked its triumphant return to the Athens Stock Exchange after a significant hiatus. This milestone reflects the bank's robust recovery and increased investor confidence, further solidifying its reputation as a leading financial institution in the region. In November 2024, Wellington Management Group LLP, a long-term investor, acquired 4,75% of the bank’s shared capital.

== Other capacities ==
Nicolaou is a member of the Board of Directors of the Association of Cyprus Banks (ACB), member of the Board of Directors of the Employers’ Association of Cyprus Banks, and Board member and member of the Executive Committee of the Cyprus Employers & Industrialists Federation (OEB).
