= Chrystalla Georghadji =

Cypriot economist

Chrystalla Georghadji (Greek: Χρυστάλλα Γιωρκάτζη; Famagusta, Cyprus, 13 July 1956) is a Cypriot economist who served as governor of the Central Bank of Cyprus (CBC) from 2014 until 2019 and as a member of the Governing Council of the European Central Bank. She is the first female governor of the CBC.

She was Auditor General of the Republic of Cyprus for sixteen years, from 1998 to 2014./

== Career ==
=== Ministry of Finance ===
Georghadji joined the Cyprus Ministry of Finance in 1981 as an Economic Officer. She was promoted to Economic Officer A and later to Senior Economic Officer, and remained at the Ministry until 1998.

During this period she also served as Deputy Chairperson of the Cyprus Securities and Exchange Commission (1993 to 1998), and as Head of the Service for the Supervision of Insurance Companies (1996 to 1998).

=== Auditor General ===
In 1998 Georghadji was appointed Auditor General of the Republic, the independent office responsible for auditing public spending. She held the post until 2014. She became known for audit reports on the misuse of public funds, which brought her into conflict with successive governments.

=== Governor of the Central Bank of Cyprus ===
On 11 April 2014 Georghadji took office as Governor of the Central Bank of Cyprus, succeeding Panicos Demetriades. As Governor she was also a member of the Governing Council of the European Central Bank. Her five year term ended in April 2019, and she was succeeded by Constantinos Herodotou.

== Honours ==
In 2000 the Association of Chartered Certified Accountants (ACCA) made Georghadji an honorary member. According to Kathimerini, this was the first time the Association had given the distinction to anyone who was not already a member.

== Early life and education ==
Chrystalla Georghadji was born in Famagusta on 13 July 1956. She studied economics at the University of Athens from 1974 to 1978. She then completed postgraduate studies in economics and econometrics at the University of Southampton (1979 to 1980), and obtained a master's degree from the University of Chicago (1982 to 1983).

She was Auditor General of the Republic from 1998 to 2014, an independent position which monitors public spending. On 11 April 2014, she was appointed governor of the Central Bank of Cyprus.
