= Coins of the Cypriot pound =

The coins of the Cypriot pound are part of the physical form of former Cypriot currency, the Cypriot pound. They have been issued since coming under British rule in 1878, until Cyprus' adoption of Euro in 2008.

== Predecimal series ==
Before 1955, 1 pound was divided into 20 shillings (σελίνι / σελίνια, şilin), and each shilling was divided into 9 piastres (γρόσι / γρόσια, kuruş).

The first coinage was issued by the British in 1879, comprising bronze piastres depicting the head of Queen Victoria on one side and the word 'Cyprus' on the verso. This was subject to some controversy at the time, with questions being asked in the British House of Commons as to the legality of the British government issuing coinage in territory which was still, legally, part of the Ottoman Empire.

- Coins of Queen Victoria (1879–1901): Queen Victoria
- Coins of King Edward VII (1902–08): King Edward VII
- Coins of King George V: King George V
- Coins of King George VI as King and Emperor (1938-1947): King George VI
- Coins of King George VI as King only (1949)

== Decimal mils ==
In 1955, Cyprus decimalized with 1000 mils (μιλς, mil) to the pound. The system was based on a proposal, presented to the British parliament in 1881, to introduce a decimal currency system into the United Kingdom. The political debate on decimalising British coinage had been going on since 1824, but the 1881 motion failed to gain parliamentary approval and so the mil-system was never introduced into the United Kingdom itself. Instead it was used in various British colonial and protectorate territories, including Palestine from 1927, and Cyprus from 1955.

=== Coins under Queen Elizabeth II (1955–1957) ===
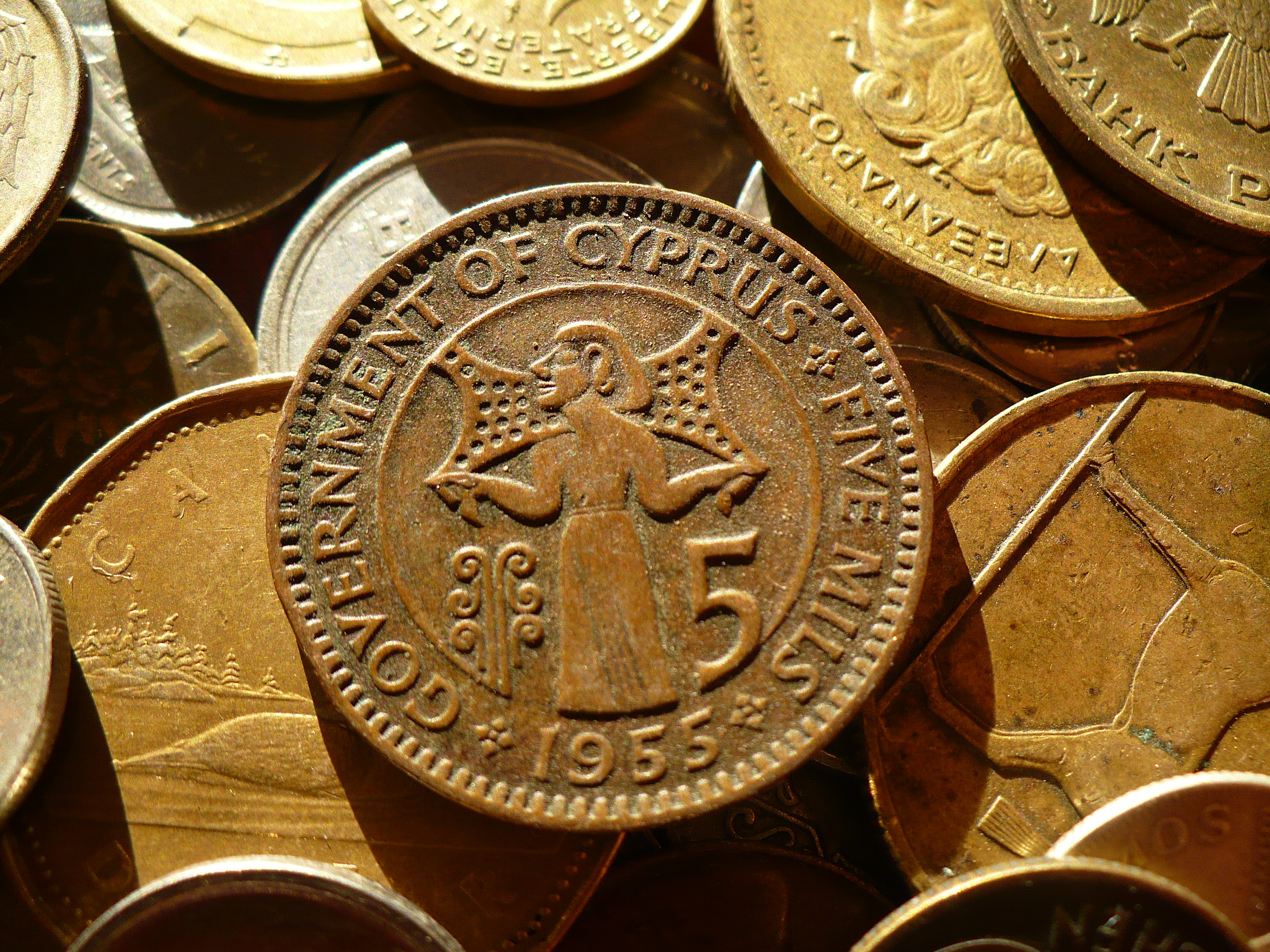
5 mils 1955

In 1955, the coins of the King George VI issues were withdrawn from circulation. These were replaced by coins with Queen Elizabeth II, denominated in mils. The coins that were issued are the following:

3 mils, 5 mils (also issued in 1956), 25 mils, 50 mils, and 100 mils (also issued in 1957).

The 50 mil coin became known as a 'shilling', because it was the same size as the 1 shilling and 9 piastre coins. The 100 mil coin became known as '2 shillings', because it was the same size as the 2 shilling and 18 piastre coins. The 5 mil coin and 100 mil coin of 1956 are very sought after by collectors of Commonwealth coins. The 100 mils is very rare.

=== Coins under the Republic (1963–1982) ===
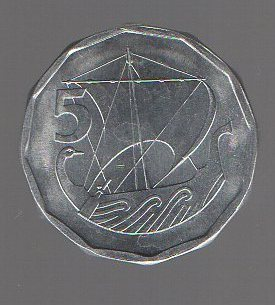
5 mils 1982

In 1960, when Cyprus became independent under the terms of the 1959 Independence Agreement, the Queen Elizabeth II coinage was allowed to stay in circulation.

In 1963, the Republic of Cyprus began to issue its first coins. These were struck at the Royal Mint in London. The coins in the 1963 issue consisted of the following: 1 mil, 5 mils, 25 mils, 50 mils, and 100 mils.

From 1970, the issue of 500 mil coins began to be issued. The 1970 500 mil coin was issued to commemorate the F.A.O. and the 25th Anniversary of the United Nations. Other 500 mil coins were issued.

In 1976, a 1-pound coin was issued to commemorate refugees of the 1974 Turkish invasion.

In 1977, a gold 50 pounds was struck as a commemorative at the Royal Mint, Llantrisant. This coin commemorates Archbishop Makarios III, who remained in office as President of Cyprus until his death.

In 1981 and 1982, 5 mil coins were struck with the name 'Cyprus' trilingually inscribed—'Kypros' in Greek, 'Cyprus' in English and 'Kıbrıs' in Turkish.

=== Archbishop Makarios III Medal-Coins ===
There were two issues of these pieces. The first issue was struck in 1966 and the second issue was struck in 1974. The obverse of these medal-coins depict the portrait of President-Archbishop Makarios III.

The reverses of these pieces depict the Palaeologus Byzantine double-headed eagle. These coins are listed in the 2005 edition of the Krause Unusual World Coins catalogue.

== Decimal cents ==
The subdivision was changed to 100 cents (σεντ, sent) to the pound on 3 October 1983. Coins were introduced for ½, 1, 2, 5, 10 and 20 cents, with the ½ cent the same size and composition as the earlier 5 mil coins. The other coins were struck in nickel-brass. The ½ cent was only struck in 1983. In 1991, cupronickel, seven-sided (reuleaux heptagon) 50 cent coins were introduced.

Decimal cent series (1983–1991)
Image	Value	Technical parameters			Description			Issued from	Withdrawn	Lapse	Cypriot terms
Image	Value	Diameter (mm)	Mass (g)	Composition	Edge	Obverse	Reverse	Issued from	Withdrawn	Lapse	Cypriot terms
	½ cent	20.00 (dodecagonal)	1.20	Aluminium	Smooth	Coat of arms; year of issue; Lettering: CYPRUS • ΚΥΠΡΟΣ • KIBRIS	Cyclamen; value	1983	1 October 1992	1 December 2001	μισούι
	1 cent	16.50	2.00	Nickel silver: Cu: 70% Zn: 24.5% Ni: 5.5%	Smooth	Coat of arms; year of issue; Lettering: CYPRUS • ΚΥΠΡΟΣ • KIBRIS	Bird and tree branch; value	1983; 1985–1990; 1991–2004	31 January 2008	31 December 2009	μονό μονόσεντο
	2 cents	19.00	2.50	Nickel silver: Cu: 70% Zn: 24.5% Ni: 5.5%	Smooth	Coat of arms; year of issue; Lettering: CYPRUS • ΚΥΠΡΟΣ • KIBRIS	Two goats from a bowl (13th century BC); value	1983; 1985–1990; 1991–2004	31 January 2008	31 December 2009	διάρι δίσεντο
	5 cents	22.00	3.75	Nickel silver: Cu: 70% Zn: 24.5% Ni: 5.5%	Smooth	Coat of arms; year of issue; Lettering: CYPRUS • ΚΥΠΡΟΣ • KIBRIS	Bull's head from a silver bowl (14th century BC); value	1983; 1985–1990; 1991–2004	31 January 2008	31 December 2009	πεντάρι πεντάρικο σελίνι
	10 cents	24.50	5.50	Nickel silver: Cu: 70% Zn: 24.5% Ni: 5.5%	Reeded	Coat of arms; year of issue; Lettering: CYPRUS • ΚΥΠΡΟΣ • KIBRIS	Clay vase from Phini; value	1983; 1985–1990; 1991–2004	31 January 2008	31 December 2009	δεκάρικο διπλοσέλινο τσιφτές
	20 cents	27.25	7.75	Nickel silver: Cu: 70% Zn: 24.5% Ni: 5.5%	Reeded	Coat of arms; year of issue; Lettering: CYPRUS • ΚΥΠΡΟΣ • KIBRIS	Cyprus pied wheatear; olive branch; value	1983; 1985–1988	31 January 2008	31 December 2009	εικοσάρικο τετρασέλινο
	20 cents	27.25	7.75	Nickel silver: Cu: 70% Zn: 24.5% Ni: 5.5%	Reeded	Coat of arms; year of issue; Lettering: CYPRUS • ΚΥΠΡΟΣ • KIBRIS	Zeno of Citium; value; Lettering: ΖΗΝΩΝ Ο ΚΙΤΙΕΥΣ	1989–1990; 1991–2004	31 January 2008	31 December 2009	εικοσάρικο τετρασέλινο
	50 cents	26.00 (heptagonal)	7.00	Cupronickel: Cu: 75% Ni: 25%	Smooth	Coat of arms; year of issue; Lettering: CYPRUS • ΚΥΠΡΟΣ • KIBRIS	Abduction of Europa by Zeus; (Marion coin (14th century BC)); Lettering: King Timocharis (Cypriot syllabary)	1991–2004	31 January 2008	31 December 2009	πενηντάρικο δεκασέλινο
For table standards, see the coin specification table.

The last 20 cent coin has a different reverse side than the one shown above. Specifically, it shows the head of Cypriot philosopher Zeno of Citium.

When brand new, the first five coins (1, 2, 5, 10, and 20 cent) have exactly the same bright golden colour and they do not differ as shown on the table above. The 50 cent coin has a rounded heptagonal shape and has a bright silver colour.

== See also ==
- Cypriot euro coins
