= Athanasios Orphanides =

Cypriot economist (born 1962)

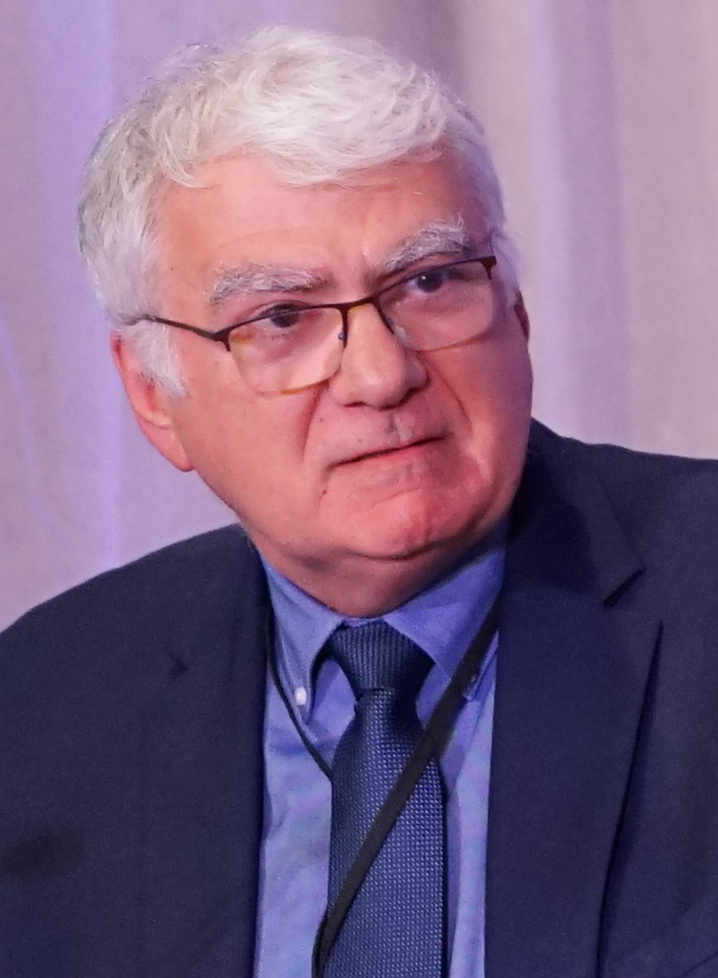
- Orphanides at ASSA 2026
- Born: 22 March 1962 (age 64); Brno, Czechoslovakia

Academic background
- Education: MIT
- Influences: Milton Friedman

Academic work
- Discipline: Monetary economics
- Institutions: MIT Sloan School of Management
- Website: Information at IDEAS / RePEc

Athanasios Orphanides (born 22 March 1962) is a Cypriot economist who served as Governor of the Central Bank of Cyprus between 3 May 2007 to 2 May 2012 and as a member of the Governing Council of the European Central Bank between 1 January 2008 and 2 May 2012.

Prior to his appointment as governor, he served as senior adviser at the board of governors of the Federal Reserve System in the US, where he started his professional career as an economist in 1999. While at the Federal Reserve, he taught undergraduate and graduate courses in macroeconomics and monetary economics at Georgetown University and Johns Hopkins University.

He holds undergraduate degrees in mathematics and economics as well as PhD in economics from the Massachusetts Institute of Technology.

On 29 April 2012, President Demetris Christofias announced that Panicos O. Demetriades would succeed Orphanides as governor of the Central Bank of Cyprus effective 3 May 2012. Orphanides is a professor at MIT Sloan School of Management.

After his mandate as governor of the ECB, Orphanides has repeatedly criticized the ECB's reliance on private credit ratings agencies for accepting assets as eligible for the ECB's monetary refinancing operations. In a September 2020 study co-authored with Yvan Lengwiler for the European Parliament's Committee on Economic and Monetary Affairs, Orphanides provided suggestions for the ECB's monetary policy strategy review.

== Research ==
A major theme of Orphanides' research on monetary economics has been the evaluation and design of monetary policy in real time. He argued that since the data available to policy makers at the time policy decisions are made are imperfect and subject to substantial revisions, the historical analysis of monetary policy decisions as well as the evaluation of alternative policy strategies must be based on the information available in real time (Orphanides, 2001, Orphanides, 2003). His work has documented significant problems arising from policy decisions drawing on unobservable concepts such as the output gap. Orphanides has argued against output-gap-based policy rules, such as the Taylor rule, and in favour of non-activist policy rules drawing on Milton Friedman and Knut Wicksell. He has stressed that overemphasizing the output gap as reflected, for example, in the Taylor rule or optimal control policy, is counterproductive for stabilizing the macroeconomy. He has also provided an explanation of the high inflation experience in the United States during the late 1960s and 1970s as resulting from policy focused too closely at stabilizing the real economy, by aiming to close the perceived output and unemployment gaps. According to this analysis, the high inflation resulted from the fact these gaps were badly mismeasured due to overoptimistic real time estimates of potential output and the natural rate of unemployment (Orphanides, 2003).

In related work, Orphanides and Simon van Norden, have explained that the unreliability of output gap measures in real time is of a more general nature than previously thought. They documented the unreliability of various statistical techniques for measuring the output gap in real-time and also the lack of predictive power of real-time output gap estimates for forecasting inflation, thus calling into question policy approaches that rely on the output for stabilization policy (Orphanides and Norden, 2002).

The role of imperfect knowledge and the formation of expectations in a learning environment has been a theme in the work by Orphanides and John C. Williams. They have argued that the central bank must ensure that inflation expectations remain well-anchored, in line with the central bank's price stability objective, in order to improve the stability of the macroeconomy. Their work documented the benefits associated with a central bank's numerical price stability objective and the pitfalls of optimal control policy design (Orphanides and Williams, 2008).

Working with Volker Wieland and others, Orphanides also contributed to research on the conduct of monetary policy near to zero lower bound for nominal interest rates. This work was motivated by the Japanese experience with near-zero rates in the late 1990s but became of immediate policy relevance during the 2008 financial crisis (Orphanides and Wieland, 2000).
