= Public Debt Management Agency (Greece) =

- Abbreviation: PDMA
- Formation: 1999
- Type: Government agency
- Region served: Greece
- Chairman: Athanasios Petralias
- Director General: Dimitris Tsakonas
- Parent organisation: Ministry of Finance
- Website: www.pdma.gr/index.php/en/

The Public Debt Management Agency (PDMA) is a government agency in Greece. Its stated purpose is the: "improvement of the cost of funding and the achievement of the best possible structure (composition and maturity) of the public debt according to the needs of the Hellenic State and the prevailing international economic conditions."

== Organisation ==
The PDMA was founded in 1999. It is headed by a Board of Directors, appointed by the Minister of Finance. This Board of Directors includes the Director General of the PDMA, who handles the day-to-day running of the agency. The current make-up is:

- Chairman of the Board: Athanasios Petralias, Secretary General of Fiscal Policy
- Deputy Chairman of the Board: Ioulia Armagou, General Director of Fiscal Policy and Budget
- Member of the Board: Theodoros Mitrakos, Deputy Governor of the Bank of Greece
- Member of the Board: Christos Triantopoulos, Secretary General of Economic Policy of the Hellenic Ministry of Finance
- Member of the Board: Dimitris Tsakonas, General Director of the PDMA

=== Director Generals of the PDMA ===
- Dimitris Tsakonas, 2018–present
- Stelios Papadopoulos, 2012–2018
- Petros Christodoulou, 2010–2012
- Spyros Papanicolaou, 2005–2010
- Christoforos Sardelis, 1999–2004

== See also ==
- Greek government-debt crisis
