= Black Eagle Litigation Fund =

Cayman distressed assets fund

- Type: Mutual fund
- Industry: Hedge fund
- Founded: Cayman Islands, (2001)
- Headquarters: Cayman Islands
- Key people: Arthur Lieber, Valery Tutykhin
- Website: blackeaglefund.org

The Black Eagle Litigation Fund is a distressed assets and special situations private fund specializing in ex-USSR based legally distressed assets and in offshore asset recovery. The main entity of the fund is based in the Cayman Islands, and rumored to be financially backed by Matvey Gorokhin, a Ukrainian born - Russian oligarch.

The fund is managed by Valery Tutykhin, one of the partners of John Tiner & Partners SA, a Geneva-based financial company.

== Activities ==
=== Early activities ===
In the early 2000s the fund invested into recovery rights and received recovery mandates for Russian and Ukrainian assets lost by original owners through illegal "raidering" schemes, often forcing the new owners to settle by taking investigation overseas and arresting their offshore assets.

=== Cyprus bank crisis ===
The fund is reported to have been speculating in rights to frozen deposits in Cyprus banks in 2013.

=== Ukrainian bank debt ===
Following the collapse of a large number of commercial banks in Ukraine during 2014 - 2015 Black Eagle Litigation Fund started purchasing selected distressed debt of such banks at the same time offering financial remuneration for information on offshore assets of major shareholders of failed banks.

=== Transaero litigation ===
It was reported that Kara Burkut Recovery Ltd., a Cyprus entity which in 2018 purchased a 1 billion Russian ruble defaulted debt of the Russian airline Transaero, and is engaged in asset tracing litigation in the US against the principals of Transaero, is associated with Black Eagle Litigation Fund. This was confirmed by the media center of the Black Eagle Litigation Fund group.

=== O1 Group bankruptcy ===
Kara Burkut Recovery Partners Ltd., a Cyprus entity supported by Black Eagle Litigation Fund, in 2020 acquired the largest portfolio of defaulted corporate bonds of O1 Group Finance LLC, an entity involved in refinancing US$1 billion debt of O1 Group Limited, and joined its bankruptcy administration as the largest creditor. O1 Group Limited was part of O1 Properties, one of the largest commercial property owners in Russia, formerly controlled by its original founder, Boris Mints. The nominal value of the O1 debt acquired by the fund was 27,516,481,435 Russian Rubles(371,6 million USD).

== See also ==
- Distressed securities fund
- Distressed securities
- Tracing in English law
- Asset Management
- Legal financing
- 2012-13 Cypriot financial crisis
