= Cypriot pound =

Currency of Cyprus from 1879 to 2007

κυπριακή λίρα (Greek); Kıbrıs lirası (Turkish)
- £20 note

ISO 4217
- Code: CYP

Unit
- Plural: pounds λίρες (Greek)
- Symbol: £

Denominations
- Subunit
- 1/100: cent σεντ (Greek) sent (Turkish)
- 1/1000: mil
- Plural
- cent σεντ (Greek) sent (Turkish): cents σεντ (Greek)
- Banknotes: £1, £5, £10, £20
- Coins
- Freq. used: 1c, 5c, 10c, 20c, 50c
- Rarely used: 2c

Demographics
- User(s): None, previously: Cyprus (except Northern Cyprus) (United Kingdom) Akrotiri and Dhekelia

Issuance
- Central bank: Cyprus Commissioner of Currency (1914-1963); Central Bank of Cyprus (1963-2007)
- Website: www.centralbank.cy

Valuation
- Inflation: 2.8%
- Source: The World Factbook, 2005 est.

EU Exchange Rate Mechanism (ERM)
- Since: 2 May 2005
- Fixed rate since: 7 December 2007
- Replaced by euro, non cash: 1 January 2008
- Replaced by euro, cash: 31 January 2008
- 1 € =: £C 0.585274
- Band: pegged in practice, 15% de jure
- This infobox shows the latest status before this currency was rendered obsolete.

The pound, or lira (Greek: λίρα, plural λίρες, and Turkish: lira, Ottoman Turkish: لیره, from the Latin libra via the Italian lira; sign: £, sometimes £C for distinction), was the currency of Cyprus, including the Sovereign Base Areas in Akrotiri and Dhekelia, from 1879 to 2007, when the Republic of Cyprus adopted the euro. However, the self-proclaimed Turkish Republic of Northern Cyprus uses the Turkish lira as its official currency.

The Cypriot pound was introduced in 1879 and was equal in value to one pound sterling. It remained at that value until 1972, some twelve years after Cyprus gained independence from the United Kingdom. The Cypriot pound was replaced by the euro as official currency of the Republic of Cyprus on 1 January 2008 at the irrevocable fixed exchange rate of £C 0.585274 = €1.00.

== History ==
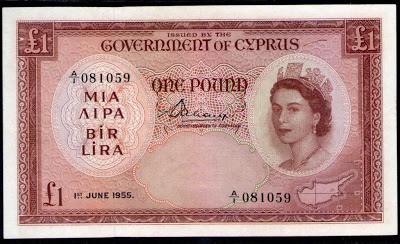
£1 note issued by the colonial government of Cyprus in 1955

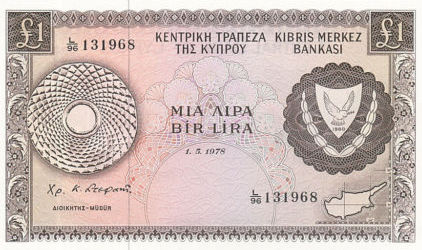
£1 note issued in 1978

The British introduced the Cypriot pound in 1879. It had the same value as the pound sterling, and replaced Turkish currency at a rate of £C 1 to 180 piastres. The Cypriot pound was initially divided into 20 shillings (σελίνι / σελίνια, şilin, شلن), in common with sterling. However, unlike the British shilling, the Cypriot shilling was divided into 9 piastres (γρόσι / γρόσια, kuruş, قروش, abbreviated cp. or p.), thus establishing a nomenclature link to earlier Ottoman currency. The piastre was itself divided into 40 para (like the kuruş). The para denomination did not appear on any coins or banknotes but was used on postage stamps. However, the 1/4-piastre coin was equal to 10 para (παράδες) and called δεκάρα in Greek and the 1/2-piastre coin was equal to 20 para and called εικοσάρα. The Cypriot pound remained equal in value to sterling until 1972, some twelve years after Cyprus gained independence from the United Kingdom.

The introduction of the Cypriot pound was controversial from its inception in 1879 as the island was technically a province of the Ottoman Empire and the right to issue currency within the Ottoman Empire rested solely with the Ottoman Sultan. A question on the legality of introducing the pound in Cyprus was raised by the British Member of Parliament, Thomson Hankey, in the United Kingdom parliament in 1879, but concerns were dismissed by the British government. This concern was rendered moot on the island following the annexation of Cyprus by Britain in 1914, in response to the Ottomans siding with the Central Powers in the First World War.

The British takeover of Cyprus in 1914 was not ratified by the Republic of Turkey until the Treaty of Lausanne in 1923, but that agreement led to the creation of a full British colonial government in Cyprus in 1926, with the establishment of a local legislative council. The Council in turn established a Cyprus Currency Board in 1927 to oversee the issue of Cypriot currency.

The Currency Board could issue notes and coins, initially denominated in pounds, shillings and piastres, and later, following decimalization in 1955, in pounds and mils. However, the Cypriot pound remained pegged at par with sterling, meaning ultimate fiscal control still rested with the Bank of England and the British government. This link was maintained by the requirement that for every pound issued by the Currency Board in Cyprus, one pound sterling issued by the Bank of England had to be deposited by the Government of Cyprus with the Crown Agents in London.

=== Decimalisation ===
In 1955, the British colonial authorities decimalised the Cypriot pound, using the "pound and mil" system proposed in 1855 by Sir William Brown MP, where the pound is divided into 1,000 parts, each called a mil (rather than 960 farthings). Although this system was never adopted in the United Kingdom, it was used in several British colonies, including Hong Kong from 1863 to 1866, and the British Mandate of Palestine from 1927 until 1948. This latter example may have been the impetus to use a pound-mil system in Cyprus as the Palestine pound was for a brief period accepted as legal tender in Cyprus.

The Cypriot pound was decimalised in 1955 at 1,000 mils (μιλς, mil) to the pound. Colloquially, the 5 mil coin was known as a piastre (not an exact equivalence; the piastre was equal to 5 5/9 mils) and the 50 mil coin as a shilling (an exact equivalence).

The subdivision was changed to 100 cents (σεντ, sent) to the pound on 3 October 1983. At that time, the smallest coin still in circulation was that of 5 mils. This was renamed as 1/2c, but soon was abolished. Mil-denominated coins are no longer legal tender.

Towards the end of the Cypriot pound's circulation, some cashiers omitted the 1c and 2c coins from the change they gave. Owner-operated businesses often rounded down the net amount to be paid to the nearest multiple of 5c.

=== Towards the euro ===
The cost of one euro in Cypriot pounds (from 1999 till 2007).

The Cypriot pound was replaced by the euro on 1 January 2008. The currency entered the Exchange Rate Mechanism II on 2 May 2005 and it was limited within the band of £C 0.585274 ±15% per euro. A formal application to adopt the euro was submitted on 13 February 2007. On May 16, 2007, Cyprus, along with Malta, received the European Commission's approval for this and was confirmed by the European Parliament on 20 June 2007 and the EU leaders on 21 June 2007. The permanent exchange rate, €1.00 = £C 0.585274, was decided by the EU Finance Ministers on 10 July 2007. From 12 July 2007 to 5 December 2007, the exchange rate remained at £C 0.5842. Since 7 December 2007, the rate has been fixed at the irrevocable rate, €1 = £C 0.585274.

In summer 2006, the Bank of Cyprus started including on its statements the indicative balance in euros. The Cyprus Telecommunications Authority followed suit with its bills two months later. A small number of shops also showed indicative euro totals on their receipts. By late autumn 2006, the number of banks and shops offering indicative euro equivalents on their statements and pricing had increased significantly.

=== Euro changeover ===
The Cypriot pound was replaced by the euro as official currency of the Republic of Cyprus on 1 January 2008 at the irrevocable fixed exchange rate of £C 0.585274 = €1. However, pound banknotes and coins continued to have legal tender status and were accepted for cash payments until 31 January 2008. Cypriot pounds were convertible free of charge at Cypriot credit institutions until 30 June 2008. Cypriot pound coins were convertible at the Central Bank of Cyprus until 31 December 2009 and banknotes were convertible until 31 December 2017.

For a wider history surrounding currency in the region, see British currency in the Middle East.

== Coins ==
=== Predecimal ===
In 1879, copper coins were introduced in denominations of 1/4, 1/2, and 1 piastre (p.). The Greek-Cypriots called the first of these coins the δεκάρα (dekara—from the Greek word deka that means ten), referring to its equivalence to 10 para. The Greek name for the 1/2p. coin was εικοσάρα (ikosara—from the Greek ikosi that means twenty). These coins were followed, in 1901, by silver 3p., 4 1/2p., 9p. and 18p., the last two being equal to 1 and 2 shillings, as the word "shilling" appeared only on banknotes and was not used on any coins until 1947. The 3p. was only issued that year. The 1/4pt was last struck in 1926. In 1934, scalloped-shaped 1/2p. and 1p. coins were introduced struck in cupro-nickel, changing to bronze in 1942. In 1947, cupro-nickel 1/– and 2/– replaced the silver coins. The last piastre and shilling coins were issued in 1949.

=== Decimal - mils ===
In 1955, 3, 5, 25, 50, and 100 mil coins were introduced, with the lowest two struck in bronze and the others in cupro-nickel. In 1963, dodecagonal, aluminium 1 mil coins were introduced, following the discontinuation of the 3 mil coin. Dodecagonal, aluminium 5 mil coins were introduced in 1981.

=== Decimal - cents ===
In 1983, coins were introduced for 1/2c, 1c, 2c, 5c, 10c and 20c, with the 1/2c the same size and composition as the earlier 5 mil coins. The other coins were struck in nickel-brass. The 1/2c was only struck in 1983. In 1991, cupronickel, Reuleaux heptagonal (curved-equilateral-heptagonal) 50c coins were introduced.

== Banknotes ==
=== Predecimal ===
In 1914, the government issued emergency notes in denominations of 10/–, and £1 and £5. Regular type notes were issued from 1917 and on. Notes for 5/– and 10/–, and £1 and £10 were introduced that year, followed by 1/- and 2/– shillings in 1920 and £5 in 1926. Denominations below 10/– were not issued after 1920 but were reintroduced in 1939, with 3p. notes issued between 1943 and 1944. The 1/– and 2/– notes were replaced by new coins in 1947.

=== Decimal mils ===
In 1955, the 5/– and 10/– notes were replaced by 250 mil and 500 mil notes. The Central Bank of Cyprus was established in 1963 as an autonomous institution in accordance with the Central Bank of Cyprus Law 1963 and the relevant articles of the constitution. It began issuing paper money in 1964, and introduced £10 notes in 1977. Notes for 250 mils ceased production in 1982, shortly before the cent was introduced.

1955–1960 Elizabeth II Issue
Image	Denomination	Obverse	Reverse
	250 mils	Queen Elizabeth II	
	500 mils	Queen Elizabeth II	
	£1	Queen Elizabeth II	
	£5	Queen Elizabeth II	

=== Decimal cents ===
On 3 October 1983, 50c notes replaced the 500 mil notes (though using the same basic design), with £20 notes added in 1992.

The 1992/1993 version of the £20 note was almost identical to the latest one in terms of design. However, it is often considered part of the 1987–1992 series despite the apparent look and feel difference. And like the rest of the 1987–1992 series, the 1992/1993 £20 note was officially withdrawn by the Central Bank a few years before the adoption of the euro.

Last series (1997)
Image		Value	Euro equivalent	Dimensions (mm)	Main colour	Description		Issue	Withdrawn	Lapse
Obverse	Reverse	Value	Euro equivalent	Dimensions (mm)	Main colour	Obverse	Reverse	Issue	Withdrawn	Lapse
		£1	€1.71	140 × 68	Brown	Cypriot girl	Kato Drys, handicraft, pottery, laces	1 February 1997	31 January 2008	31 December 2017
		£5	€8.54	148 × 72	Purple	Limestone head	Peristerona church and mosque	1 February 1997	31 January 2008	31 December 2017
		£10	€17.09	156 × 76	Green	Artemis	Cyprus warbler, green turtle, Glaucopsyche paphos, Mouflon, Tulipa cypria, Cyclamen	1 February 1997	31 January 2008	31 December 2017
		£20	€34.17	164 × 80	Blue	Aphrodite	Kyrenia boat, Petra Tou Romiou	1 October 1997	31 January 2008	31 December 2017
These images are to scale at 0.7 pixel per millimetre (18 pixel per inch). For table standards, see the banknote specification table.

== See also ==
- British currency in the Middle East
- Cypriot euro coins
- Economy of Cyprus
