= Kirill Zimarin =

- Кири́лл Зимáрин
- Born: 1971 (age 54–55)
- Occupation: banker
- Known for: Former CEO of RCB Bank

Kirill A. Zimarin (born in January 1971) is a Russian banker and businessman, and a former CEO of RCB Bank.

== Education ==
In 1993, Zimarin graduated with from the Lomonosov Moscow State University obtaining a bachelor's degree in economics of foreign countries and international relations, followed by a PhD in 1996 and a doctorate in economics in 2015.

== Career ==
=== Russia ===
Zimarin started his banking in 1993 and worked in some medium-sized banks as dealer in financial markets, head of international operation, and senior management positions.

In 2003 he joined VTB Group, where he served as head of department in Vneshtorgbank (now – Bank VTB) and deputy president-chairman of the executive board of CJSC Vneshtorgbank Retail Services (rebranded to VTB24 in 2006) and Head of Investment Banking Division.

=== Cyprus ===
In 2005, Zimarin joined RCB Bank (then Russian Commercial Bank) as a deputy CEO and a member of the board of directors. Since 2008 he has served as CEO and continues to be a director. RCB Bank is one of the largest financial institutions in Cyprus.

Since 2008, Zimarin has been president of the Association of International Banks in Cyprus. The Association was set up in Limassol in 2002 and represents the interests of international banks in Cyprus, currently bringing together 23 banks.

Since 2011, Zimarin has been a member of the International Affairs Steering Group of the European Banking Federation (EBF). The Steering Group monitors WTO/GATS/EU bilateral trade agreement issues, foreign legislation, in particular in the US, which affect European banks.

Since 2011, Zimarin has also been a director of the Association of Cyprus Banks.

In 2016, Zimarin was appointed a member of the International Presidential Business Advisory Council that plays an important role in forming business policy in Cyprus.

In December 2016, during the signing ceremony of the first EFSI agreement in Cyprus between the European Investment Fund and RCB Bank Ltd, Zimarin stated:

“The role of the banking system in Cyprus is to provide the much needed liquidity to healthy businesses that want to materialize their investment and growth plans. This is how we help the efforts of the government to achieve viable growth”.

In 2022, RCB Bank stopped its operations, following the orderly completion of its voluntary phasing out of its banking operations.

== Bibliography ==
- Voprosy teorii i praktiki formirovaniya evropeyskoy finansovoy sistemy, 2012, ISBN 978-5282032574
