= Robne kuće Beograd =

Department Stores chain

- Official logo
- Native name: Робне куће Београд
- Company type: d.o.o.
- Industry: Real Estate
- Founded: 19 June 1996; 29 years ago (Current form); 1965; 61 years ago (Founded)
- Headquarters: Makenzijeva 57, Belgrade, Serbia
- Area served: Serbia
- Key people: Krsta Sandić (Director)
- Products: Clothing, cosmetics, housewares
- Revenue: ▲€10.86 million (2019)
- Net income: ▲€104.23 million (2019)
- Total assets: ▲€266.71 million (2019)
- Total equity: €0 (2019)
- Owner: MIG Real Estate (83.11%); Verano d.o.o. (16.89%)
- Number of employees: 45 (2019)
- Website: rkbeograd.rs

Robne kuće Beograd (Serbian Cyrillic: Робне куће Београд; Anglicized: Department Stores Belgrade) is a chain of department stores across Serbia, with headquarters in Belgrade.

== History ==
Robne kuće Beograd company was founded in 1965 and soon became the largest supermarket chain in former SFR Yugoslavia, and third largest chain in Europe. In 1970, it opened a store in the capital city of Belgrade that opened 24 hours a day, the first such store in SFR Yugoslavia. During its golden times, it had 10,000 employees and more than 100,000 articles in stock. It has been briefly a member of the International Association of Department Stores, from 1980 to 1983. During the 1990s, Robne kuće Beograd faced huge problems in its operations, caused by breakup of SFR Yugoslavia and international sanctions on FR Yugoslavia.

Finally, in 2002, it went into bankruptcy procedure. The department stores were successfully auctioned off on 29 October 2007, to the Serbian Peugeot vehicle importer "Verano Motors" for 360 million euros. Most of that money, the Government of Serbia spent for other purposes and former shareholders left deprived; the company itself continued working with limited operations, mostly leasing its properties to global brand chains. One of the biggest problems with its stores in Belgrade are legal proceedings that would determine status of ownership of these properties, as many of them are allegedly nationalized during the 1940s and 1950s, and are subject to the eventual restitution. As of 2008, Robne kuće Beograd managed with 34 department stores in Serbia, of which eight were located in Belgrade.

In 2008, Greek Marfin Investment Group took the majority of shares in Robne kuće Beograd from "Verano Motors".
