= NewDay (company) =

British financial services company

NewDay Ltd
- Formerly: Progressive Credit Limited (2010–2014)
- Type: Limited company
- Industry: Financial services
- Founded: September 2000
- Headquarters: London, England
- Key people: John Hourican (CEO)
- Products: Credit products
- Website: newday.co.uk

NewDay Ltd, formerly SAV Credit, is a financial services company specialising in providing credit products to consumers in the United Kingdom.

== History ==
The company was established in 2000.

On 13 May 2013 the company completed the purchase of Santander UK's store card business, including branded cards issued for retailers including Topshop, Dorothy Perkins, House of Fraser and Debenhams. Santander continued to operate the cards business until 1 April 2014, when SAV took full control and was renamed NewDay.

In March 2015, it was rumoured that NewDay was for sale, valuing the company at around $1.49 billion.

In May 2018, NewDay partnered with credit reporting agency TotallyMoney to relaunch the Fluid balance transfer credit card targeting the near-prime market.

In March 2019, John Hourican was named CEO of NewDay, succeeding James Corcoran to the position.

It was announced in May 2022 that John Lewis Partnership's white-label agreement with HSBC UK would end later that year, with new and existing Partnership Card accounts migrated to a reshaped service run by NewDay.

== Structure ==
NewDay is organised into two limited companies: NewDay Technology Ltd and NewDay Cards Ltd. Both are authorised and regulated by the Financial Conduct Authority, and subscribe to the Lending Code.

== Investors ==
Private equity firms Cinven and CVC Capital Partners are investors, both having representatives on its board of directors.
