= Bank of Cyprus =

Cypriot financial services company

- Native name: Τράπεζα Κύπρου Δημόσια Εταιρεία Λίμιτεδ
- Type: Public company
- Traded as: CSE: BOCY; ATHEX: BOCHGR
- Industry: Banking, financial services
- Founded: 1899
- Headquarters: Strovolos, Cyprus
- Number of locations: 56 branches (2025)
- Area served: Cyprus
- Key people: Takis Arapoglou (Chairman); Panicos Nicolaou (CEO)
- Products: Retail banking; business banking; credit cards; mortgage loans; corporate banking; factoring; insurance; brokerage; private banking; wealth management; investment management; investment banking
- Revenue: €1.096 billion (2024)
- Operating income: ▲€199 million (2024)
- Net income: ▲€71 million (2024)
- Total assets: €29.1 billion (Q2 2026)
- Total equity: €2.9 billion (2025)
- Number of employees: 2,850 (2025)
- Subsidiaries: Genikes Insurance; EuroLife (Cyprus)
- Capital ratio: Common equity Tier 1 capital (fully loaded basis) = 14.7%
- Website: bankofcyprus.com.cy

The Bank of Cyprus (BoC; Greek: Τράπεζα Κύπρου; Turkish: Kıbrıs Bankası) is a Cypriot financial services company established in 1899 with its headquarters in Strovolos.

Bank of Cyprus has been designated as a Significant Institution since the entry into force of European Banking Supervision in late 2014, and as a consequence is directly supervised by the European Central Bank.

== Operations ==
As of December 2025, the Bank of Cyprus operated 56 branches (two of which were cash offices not offering loans) or business offices across the Republic of Cyprus. The group also has representative offices in Romania (€33 million net exposure as of 2007), Greece (€309 million exposure as of 2007), Russia (€21 million net exposure as of 2007), Ukraine, and China. It is the largest bank in Cyprus by market penetration, with 83% of Cypriots having active Bank of Cyprus accounts, representing 60% of total corporate accounts and 40% of the overall banking sector.

=== Listing ===
The shares of the bank are listed on the Cyprus Stock Exchange (CSE). The bank is the largest listed company on the CSE in terms of market capitalization. Since 8 October 2007, it has been part of the Cyprus 10 Index, which comprises the 10 largest companies in Cyprus. It was listed on the Athens Exchange from 2000 to 9 January 2017 and was part of the FTSE/Athex Large Cap index from 9 October 2006 to March 2013. It was also listed on the London Stock Exchange from January 2017 until September 2024. In September 2024, Bank of Cyprus decided to end its listing on London Stock Exchange and relist on the Athens Stock Exchange.

== History ==
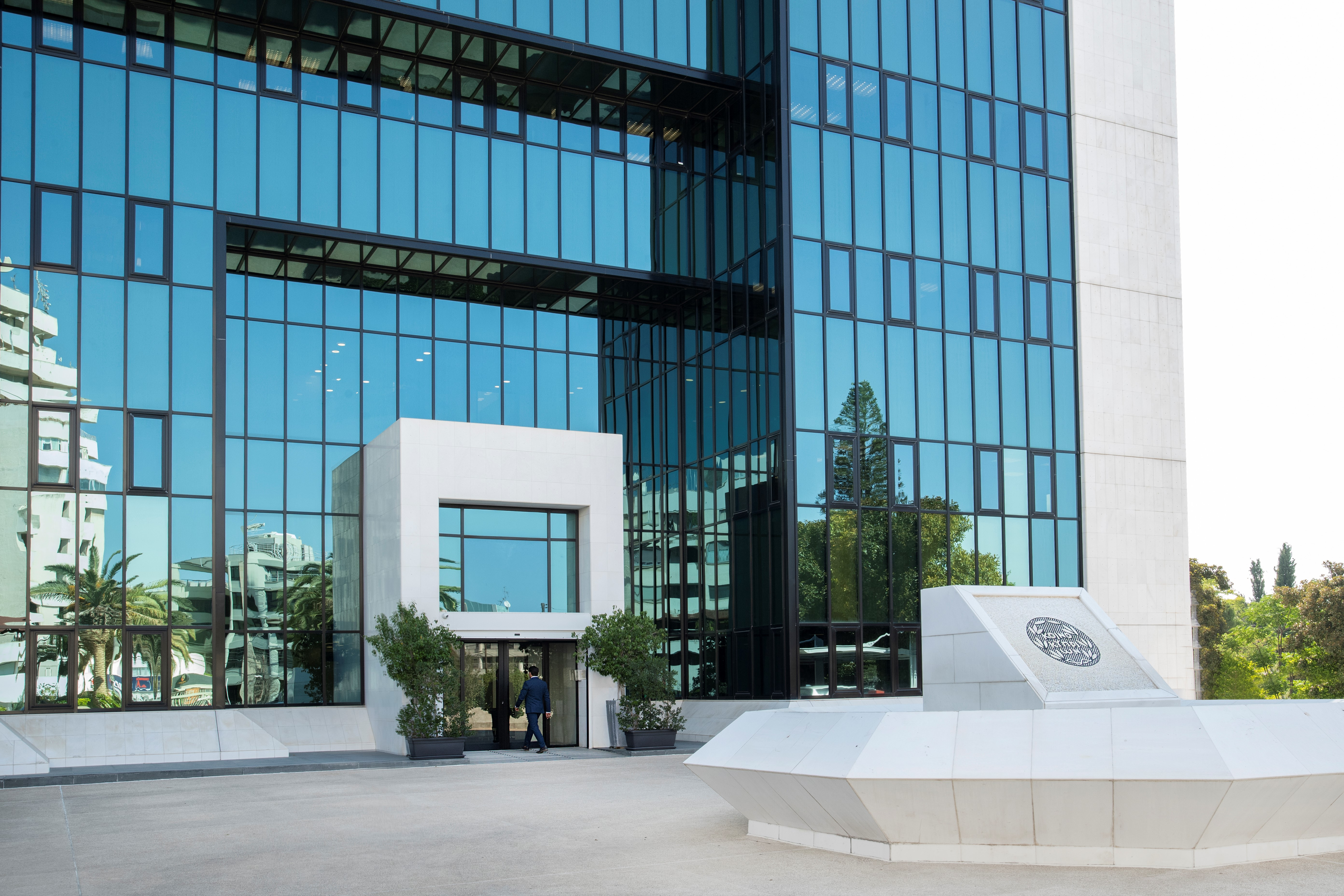
Bank of Cyprus headquarters next to Central Bank of Cyprus

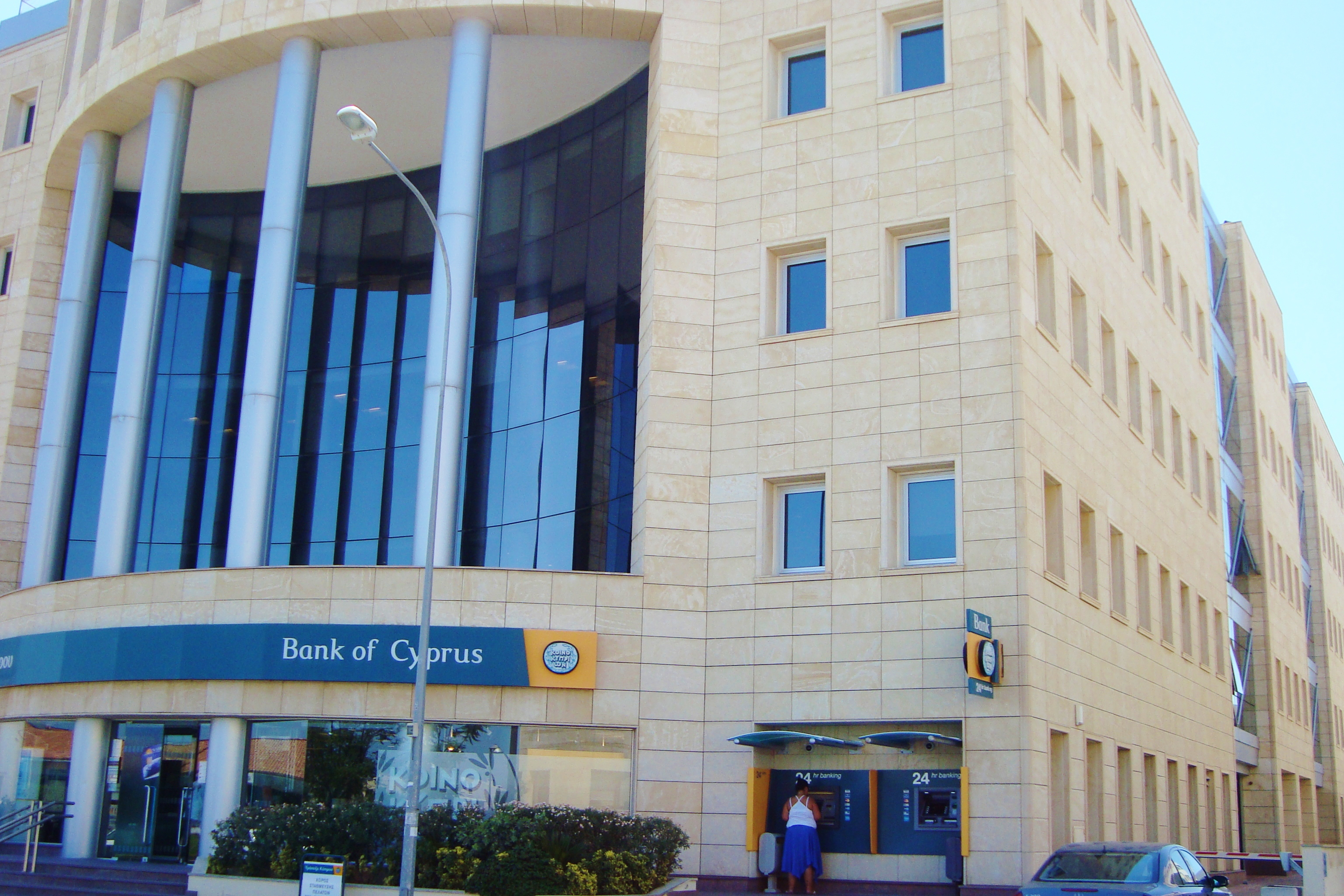
Bank of Cyprus new offices in Aglandjia

The Nicosia Savings Bank or Nicosia Depository (Ταμιευτήριο η Λευκωσία) was founded on 1 January 1899 by a group of Cypriots led by Ioannis Economides, a figure in financial and social circles. The bank was the first Cypriot bank, with all the other banks in Cyprus being foreign-owned. In 1912, it became a public company and changed its name to Bank of Cyprus (BoC). In 1930, BoC incorporated as a limited company and in 1943 it merged with Famagusta Bank and Larnaca Bank (est. 1926).

In 1944, BoC acquired the Melissa Bank, Paphos (est. 1924), and the Mortgage Bank of Cyprus was established. In 1945, BoC merged with the Cyprus Savings Bank (Kypriakon Tomieftiron) (est. 1908). In 1953, BoC merged with Paphos Popular Bank (Paphos Laiki Bank) (est. 1924).

In 1955, BoC opened the London branch, its first branch abroad, and in 1960 BoC established a subsidiary, Bank of Cyprus (London) Ltd.: Xeros, Morphou and Zodhia (Nicosia District), Golden Sands, Kato Varosha, Kennedy Avenue, Democratias Avenue, Evagoras Avenue and Oceania (Famagusta Town), Yialousa, Rizokarpaso and Lysi (Famagusta District), and Kyrenia, Karavas and Lapithos branches (Kyrenia District).

In 1982, BoC acquired Standard Chartered Bank's Cypriot operations. (The then Chartered Bank had bought the Ionian Bank's Cypriot operations in 1957.) BoC also opened a representative office in Greece. In 1986, BoC opened a representative office in Australia.

- 1991 BoC established its first branch in Greece.
- 1995 BoC opened a representative office in South Africa, and a branch in Heraklion, Crete.
- 1996 BoC established Bank of Cyprus (Channel Islands) in Guernsey, and a representative office in Toronto, Ontario, Canada, located in the heart of Greektown in Toronto to serve mainly the Greek-Cypriot community.
- A subsidiary company, Cyprus Leasing S.A., was established in Greece to deal with leasing activities. It is now the second largest of its kind in Greece. In Cyprus, leasing activities are carried out by a dedicated department of BoC itself rather than a focused subsidiary.
- 1998 BoC established representative offices in New York and Moscow.

=== 2000s ===
- 2000 BoC established a subsidiary in Australia, the country with the world's largest Greek and Cypriot community. BOC had long had a presence in the Australian market through its representative offices in Sydney, Melbourne, Adelaide and Brisbane. BoC also opened a representative office in Bucharest.

BoC bid for Interbank in New York for about $43 million. Interbank was 78% owned by Greek businessman Dimitris Kontominas, and the remaining equity was dispersed among three other shareholders. With four branches in New York, including the Astoria, Queens area where there is a strong Greek presence, the bank catered to the Greek American community. The U.S. Federal Reserve withheld its approval and the bid expired.

- 2004 BoC merged its UK branch with its subsidiary Bank of Cyprus (London) Ltd. to form "Bank of Cyprus UK".
- 2005 BoC opened its Pallini branch in eastern Athens, reaching 100 branches in Greece.
- 2007 On 8 October, BoC opened a branch in Moscow, the first Cypriot bank to have banking operations in Russia. In the same year, two branches were opened in Athens (Haidari and Spata).
- 2008 BoC purchased 80% of Uniastrum, the 9th largest bank in Russia, for US$576 million. Gagik Zakarian and George Piskov, founders of Uniastrum, retained a 10% stake each as president and chairman, respectively. Uniastrum Bank had over 220 branches throughout Russia and continued to operate under its own name, which however was linked with that of the Bank of Cyprus Group. Just at that time, funds under Uniastrum management went bankrupt. Investors lost US$100 million.
- 2008 BoC acquired 97% of AvtoZAZBank in Ukraine, which operated through 26 branches and 18 seasonal cash offices located in Ukraine's four main regions. The bank traded under the Bank of Cyprus name.
- 2009 BoC's Romanian office announced that it had purchased 9.7% of TLV's (Banca Transilvania) shares for 58 million euros, and in May 2010 expressed interest in acquiring 20% of TLV's stock. DIICOT, the Romanian body that investigates organized crime and terrorism, charged the head of TLV's administration council, Horia Ciorcila, and the head of BoC Romania, Georgios Christoforou, with stock market manipulation and money laundering in this transaction. BoC Romania denied any wrongdoing. The Bucharest Tribunal acquitted Ciorcila and Christoforou on 4 July 2011, as did the Bucharest Court of Appeal on 27 June 2012.

=== 2010s ===
- 2010 BoC established a banking unit in the Dubai International Financial Centre (DIFC), in the Emirate of Dubai, in the United Arab Emirates. It also established a representative office in India. In Cyprus, Ayios Lazaros branch in Larnaca closed, due to the forthcoming demolition of the building housing it. Despite the harsh economic downturn in Greece, the network there continued to grow, with the opening of 20 branches throughout Greece, with 10 located in Greater Athens, five in Salonica, and five in other areas. Russian oligarch Dmitriy Rybolovlev (through Odella Resources fund) acquired 9.7% of BoC.
- 2011 BoC sold Bank of Cyprus Australia to Bendigo and Adelaide Bank. The former Bank of Cyprus Australia is now known as Delphi Bank. In 2022 Bendigo and Adelaide Bank transitioned all Delphi Bank customers into their main brand Bendigo and branches were closed. The Delphi brand no longer is present in Australian banking.
- 2012 Bank of Cyprus UK became a subsidiary, regulated by the Financial Services Authority. Under pressure from the Central Bank of Cyprus, CEO Andreas Eliades and Deputy CEO Yiannis Pehlivanides resigned as BoC could not reach by private means the 9% Core Tier 1 capital by 30 June 2012 that the European Banking Authority had required. Eliades's replacement was Yiannis Kypri. Later Chairman Theodoros Aristodemou resigned and was replaced by Andreas Artemi. The bank was also forced to re-consider its strategy of rapid international expansion.
- 2012–2013 Due to the harsh economic downturn in both Cyprus and Greece, BoC began downsizing its network in Greece by closing branches, with the greater Athens area most affected (closures as at March 2013 were the branches at Omonia Square, Phidippides Street, America Square, Gyzi, Tavros, Petralona, Kessariani, Nea Ionia, Yerakas, Spata, Peania, Drapetsona, Ayios Ierotheos and Keratea). Three branches were closed in Salonica (Nikis Street, Stavros and Ionia), one in Patra (Acrotiriou Street, leaving the Corinth Street and Ayea branches in operation), one in Heraclion, Crete (62 Martyrs Avenue), Asklipiou Street in Trikala, which was merged with the town's other branch at 28 October Street, the Corfu Harbour branch was merged with the Corfu Town branch, Ialyssos branch on the island of Rhodes was absorbed by the Rhodes Town branch, while the towns of Alexandria in northern Greece and Loutraki became devoid of Bank of Cyprus branches altogether. In most cases, the ATMs of the branches were either retained on site or transferred to nearby premises to allow former customers some form of access to their accounts. In addition to downsizing the network, the bank reduced its staff by 300 by way of voluntary redundancy, but aimed to further reduce its number of branches first to 110 from 166, and then closing all of its smaller branches with up to five staff, maintaining only a small number of branches in key locations.
- On 26 March 2013 the Greek branches of the bank, along with those of CPB Bank (the Greek arm of the now defunct Laiki Bank) and Hellenic Bank, were sold to Piraeus Bank. Unlike other banks in the Piraeus Bank Group (e.g. Geniki Bank), which retained for a while its corporate identity, the "Bank of Cyprus" brand was replaced in the ex-Bank of Cyprus branches by the Piraeus Bank corporate identity.
- On 29 March 2013 the loan business (advances) of Cyprus Popular Bank Public Co Ltd (Laiki UK), pursuant to a legal decree put in place by the Cypriot authorities, was transferred to Bank of Cyprus Public Co Ltd (Bank of Cyprus.) Also the Romanian operations apart from Head Office and some loans were taken over by Marfin Romania.
- In 2013 Cyprus Popular Bank was absorbed into the Bank of Cyprus. On 27 March 2013 the board and CEO were replaced. A Special Administrator was put in place (Dinos Christophides) for 4 months to oversee the merger with the good parts of Cyprus Popular Bank. A new interim board (with Dr Sophocles Michaeilides as Chairman) and interim CEO (Christos Sorotos) were put in place for 3 months, to replace the Special Administrator to lead the bank to an Annual General Meeting on 10 September 2013 and to oversee the "bail in" of depositors and to restructure and downsize the new bank. Staff salaries were cut up to 30% and a voluntary retirement scheme was agreed with the bank workers' union. The branch network in Cyprus was also rationalised, as were the head office functions of the two merged banks. A new CEO John Hourican took the helm with Dr. Christis Hasapis as Chairman.
- Any depositor with over €100,000 in 2013 had 47.5% of their deposits taken and were given shares in the bank in exchange. This resulted in Russians owning a major portion of the bank and at the shareholders meeting 6 Russians were appointed to the board of directors out of a total of 16 board members.
- 2014 BoC sold off non-core assets including stakes in Romanian Banca Transilvania and Ukrainian AvtoZAZBank. After a 1 billion euro increase in capital led by CEO John Hourican, a new board and shareholders took the helm in November 2014 led by Josef Ackermann and Wilbur Ross. Ross represented funds that controlled about 19% of the bank, including Renova Group's affiliate Lamesa Investments Ltd 9.2% stake in 2018 (5.46% in 2014) and TD Asset Management with 5.23% in 2014. Ross brought with him as co-chair Vladimir Strzhalkovsky, who was a former KGB agent and one-time chairman of Norilsk Nickel from August 2008 to December 2012, as well as a long-time close associate of Vladimir Putin; however, Strzhalkovsky was replaced in 2015 with Maksim Goldman, who was a board member of Rusal until 11 April 2018 and directs the Viktor Vekselberg associated Renova Group's strategic projects.
- 2015 On the 26 January 2015 The bank authorised Bank of Cyprus UK to administer debt on their behalf for all ex Laiki UK (Cyprus Popular Bank Public Co Ltd) customers. The Russian subsidiary Uniastrum Bank was sold in July 2015. The last remaining Romanian Branch was wound down, with the bank focusing only on its two key markets: Cyprus and the United Kingdom.
- 2016 The Bank repaid its Emergency Liquidity Assistance and de-listed from the Athens Exchange in exchange for a listing in Dublin.
- 2017 On 19 January the bank was listed on the London Stock Exchange.
- 2018 In July the bank sold its UK subsidiary for S£103 million to Cynergy Capital Ltd., to focus on its home market. The branches of the bank's former UK subsidiary were rebranded as Cynergy Bank on 3 December 2018.
- 2019 Chairman Josef Ackermann announced his departure before the May Annual General Meeting and was replaced by Greek banker Takis Arapoglou who was chairman of the Titan Cement and formerly the governor of the National Bank of Greece (Greek: Εθνική Τράπεζα της Ελλάδος) from 2004 to 2009. CEO John Hourican will also step down in September 2019 and is being replaced by Panicos Nicolaou.

=== 2020s ===
- 2022 The largest shareholder of the Bank of Cyprus, Viktor Vekselberg with 9.27% of the bank shares, who was already under US sanctions, was sanctioned again by the U.S. and by the UK and the EU.
- 2023 Eight shareholders owned 50.38% of the 446.2 million shares in the bank.
- In January 2024 the bank left Russia when it closed its representative offices in Moscow and St. Petersburg.

In September 2025, the European Bank for Reconstruction and Development (EBRD) announced the sale of its 5.1% share in Bank of Cyprus that it acquired in 2014 during the banking crisis and subsequent restructuring.

In March 2026, Bank of Cyprus acquired Cyprus Development Bank (CDB Bank) but took over only the financially healthy assets of CDB Bank, including €500 million in deposits and €150 million in performing loans, while the non-performing loans remained with CDB Bank.

== Deposit tax and bail out or bail in ==
A decision was imposed by EU finance ministers to force depositors in Cyprus to take a loss (bail in), in order to help fund an International Monetary Fund and euro zone bailout (bail-in in the case of Bank of Cyprus: with 47.5% of uninsured depositors, above 100,000 Euro, contributing to the bank's recapitalization). The bail in converted €3.8 billion or around 25% of deposits to capital, with the bank receiving around 20,000 new shareholders.

== Shareholders ==
As of May 2026, Bank of Cyprus's main shareholders were:

Shareholder	Stake (% of ordinary shares)
Senvest Management LLC	9.32%
Lamesa Investments Limited	9.50%
Wellington Management Group LLP	4.94%
Provident Fund of the Cyprus Bank Employees	4.76%
Eaton Vance Management	3.75%
Osome Investments Limited	3.40%

== See also ==
- List of banks in Cyprus
- List of banks in the euro area
