= Cyprus Popular Bank =

Financial institution based in NIcosia, Cyprus

Cyprus Popular Bank Public Co. Ltd
- Type: Private company (Subsidiary)
- Industry: Financial services
- Founded: 1901
- Headquarters: Nicosia, Cyprus
- Area served: Cyprus, International
- Products: Private banking, investment management, wealth management
- Owner: Bank of Cyprus
- Website: www.laikibank.eu

Cyprus Popular Bank (CPB), widely known as Laiki Bank and between 2006 and 2011 operating under the name Marfin Popular Bank (MPB), is a prominent financial institution in Cyprus. Following a major corporate restructuring in 2013, it was transformed into a dedicated private banking and investment subsidiary within the Bank of Cyprus group, where it currently operates as an autonomous private investment bank.

Founded in 1901 in Limassol, the institution developed into one of the most important financial organisations in Cyprus, expanding its operations throughout Europe and maintaining a presence in Greece, the United Kingdom, Russia, Ukraine, Romania, Serbia and Malta.

During the 2012–2013 Cypriot financial crisis, Cyprus Popular Bank experienced severe financial difficulties arising from its exposure to the Greek financial crisis, non-performing loans and capital adequacy requirements. Following the restructuring programme agreed between the Republic of Cyprus, the European Union and international creditors, the bank entered a resolution process in March 2013.

Under the resolution framework, the domestic retail operations, performing assets and insured deposits of Cyprus Popular Bank were transferred to and absorbed by the Bank of Cyprus. Concurrently, the core brand and specialised wealth management structures were repositioned. Rather than facing total liquidation, the institution was structurally integrated into the Bank of Cyprus group in 2013, transitioning its operational model from a mass-market commercial bank to a dedicated, autonomous private banking and investment division.

As a result of this restructuring, the private-banking relationships and wealth-management units previously maintained by Cyprus Popular Bank continued to operate. Under its mandate within the Bank of Cyprus framework, it maintains operational autonomy, catering exclusively to high-net-worth individuals and institutional investment services as the private investment banking arm of the group.

Prior to its 2013 restructuring, Cyprus Popular Bank operated a network of more than 295 retail branches and was listed on both the Cyprus Stock Exchange and the Athens Stock Exchange. Following its transition into a private entity within Bank of Cyprus, it remains one of the most recognisable banking brands in Cyprus.

== History ==
=== Foundation and early growth (1901–1967) ===
In 1901, four leading citizens of Limassol established the Popular Savings Bank of Limassol with the objective of encouraging savings and providing financial services to local workers and businesses.

In 1924, the institution adopted the name Popular Bank of Limassol and became one of the first publicly traded companies in Cyprus.

=== Expansion throughout Cyprus (1967–2000) ===
In 1967, the bank adopted the name Cyprus Popular Bank to reflect its nationwide presence. During the following decades, branches were established across Cyprus, including in Nicosia, Famagusta, Paphos and Larnaca.

The bank continued to expand internationally, opening representative offices and subsidiaries in Europe, North America, Africa and Australia, while also strengthening its presence in Greece and the United Kingdom.

=== Marfin era (2006–2011) ===
In 2006, the Marfin Investment Group acquired a controlling interest in the bank and rebranded the institution as Marfin Popular Bank. During this period, the group expanded its regional banking operations and pursued acquisitions in Eastern Europe and Russia.

In 2011, the bank returned to its historic name, Cyprus Popular Bank, while continuing to use the Laiki Bank brand in Cyprus and several international markets.

=== Financial crisis and restructuring (2012–2013) ===
The bank was significantly affected by the Greek sovereign debt crisis and the deterioration of its loan portfolio. In June 2012, the Cypriot government recapitalised the institution and became its majority shareholder.

In March 2013, as part of the restructuring of the Cypriot banking sector, Cyprus Popular Bank was reorganized. The performing domestic retail operations were transferred to Bank of Cyprus, while its specialized asset management and private banking units were reorganized under a new corporate governance model, leading to its transformation into an autonomous investment banking subsidiary within the Bank of Cyprus group.

=== Integration and modern operations as an Investment Bank (2014–present) ===
Following the conclusion of the stabilization period under special administration, the entity completed its full transition into the Bank of Cyprus group structure. Instead of facing total dissolution, the brand was revitalized and restructured to leverage its institutional relationships.

The bank currently operates as a fully licensed, autonomous private investment bank within the group. In this capacity, it focuses on wealth management, corporate advisory, and private banking services, utilizing its legacy infrastructure while benefiting from the liquidity and capital backing of its parent organization, the Bank of Cyprus.

== Legacy and Corporate Status ==
Cyprus Popular Bank played a central role in the development of the Cypriot banking sector for more than a century. Although the institution ceased operating as an independent retail commercial bank in 2013, its institutional framework was successfully integrated into the operations of Bank of Cyprus, where it continues its operational history in the private investment sector.

Its shares were formerly listed on the Cyprus Stock Exchange and the Athens Stock Exchange. CPB had a network of more than 295 branches in Cyprus, Russia, Ukraine, Romania, Serbia, the UK and Malta. The bank had applied to open a representative office in Beijing, People's Republic of China.

Trading on the island as Laiki Bank (Laiki being the Greek word for Popular), as of September 2012 it held a 16% share of the market in loans and a 14.4% share of deposits. The Bank made a series of large loans, many to Greek companies prior to and during their financial crisis. What followed has been described as "billions handed out in bad loans created a financial time-bomb". After the bank faced financial distress, it was rescued by the Cypriot government, which took 84% ownership on 30 June 2012. Following the 2012–2013 Cypriot financial crisis, its retail network was merged into Bank of Cyprus, while its corporate identity and private banking arms were preserved for specialized investment financial services.

== Chronology ==
In 1901, four leading citizens of Limassol—Agathoclis Francoudis, Ioannis Kyriakides, Christodoulos Sozos and Neoklis Ioannides—established the Popular Savings Bank of Limassol to encourage saving among the workforce. More than two decades later, in 1924, the bank changed its name from the Popular Savings Bank of Limassol to the Popular Bank of Limassol. The bank also became the first company in Cyprus to register as a public-traded company.

Then in 1967, the Popular Bank of Limassol changed its name to Cyprus Popular Bank (CPB) to reflect the bank’s expansion beyond Limassol. Expansion beyond Limassol followed quickly, with the establishment of its first branches in Nicosia, Famagusta (1969), and Paphos and Larnaca (1970). Also in 1970, Midland Bank acquired 22% of the company's shares, making Midland a major shareholder in CPB. The next year CPB relocated its headquarters from Limassol to Nicosia.

- 1974 CPB established its first London branch.
- 1983 CPB acquired all the Cyprus operations of Grindlays Bank located in the area under government control.
- 1992 CPB opened the first branch of European Popular Bank in Athens. CPB owned 58% of the shares of the bank; other shareholders included HSBC (formerly Midland Bank) and Greek and Cypriot investors. CPB retained branches in Heraklion and Thessaloniki
- 1995 CPB opened its first representative offices in South Africa and in Toronto, Ontario, Canada.
- 1996 CPB opened its first representative offices in Australia.
- 1997 CPB opened its first representative offices in Serbia and in Russia ("Rosprombank")
- 1998 CPB establishes a representative office in New York. (NY State Banking Dept says State chartered).
- 2000 The Cyprus Popular Bank Group changed its name to Laiki Group.
- 2001 The Laiki Group established a subsidiary in Australia with five branches.
- 2005 The Group established Laiki Bank (Guernsey), and purchased Bank Centrobank in Serbia.
- 2006 The Greek Marfin Investment Group acquired HSBC's shares in Laiki Bank, establishing a strong minority share position. Subsequently, the Marfin Investment Group through more acquisitions managed to take control of Laiki Bank, which it re-branded as Marfin Popular Bank. In Greece, the Marfin Group consolidated Egnatia, Laiki and Marfin to form Marfin Egnatia Bank, which is the 95%-owned Greek subsidiary of Marfin Popular Bank.
- 2007 The bank announced the planned takeover of 50.12% of the share capital of AS SBM Pank, a bank in Estonia.

MPB also acquired 99.2% of the shares of Marine Transport Bank Ukraine for US$156 million. This bank was founded in 1993 as Marine Trade Bank and changed its name to Marine Transport Bank in 1996. It has its headquarters in the Odesa region and has 86 branches.
Lastly, MPB acquired 43% of the share capital of Lombard Bank Malta for €48 million from Banca della Svizzera Italiana (BSI) of Lugano. CPB now holds c. 49% of Lombard Bank Malta.

- In 2007, the bank announced a multi-million financial deal to sponsor the football First Division in Cyprus until 2010.
- 2008 Marfin Popular Bank completed its acquisition of 50.4% of the shares of CJSC RPB Holding, parent company of the Rossisysky Promishlenny Bank (Rosprombank), for €83 million. The acquisition makes Marfin the first Greek or Cypriot bank to acquire control of a bank in Russia.
- In 2010, they launched a new mobile banking and mobile trading service. In the same year, the company was selected as the bank of the year in Cyprus by the Banker.
- 2010 MPB sold 85% of Laiki Bank Australia to Bank of Beirut. The Australian bank received a new name, Beirut Hellenic Bank. At the time, the bank had a branch in Adelaide, four branches in Melbourne and five branches in Sydney.
- 2011 MPB sold the majority of its shareholding in its Estonian subsidiary and returned to its historic name of Cyprus Popular Bank (CPB).
- In 2012 CPB converted its Greek subsidiary into a branch of the parent bank.
- The 2012–2013 Cypriot financial crisis resulted in financial difficulties at CPB. The Cypriot state recapitalized CPB on 30 June 2012 with the result that the government acquired 84% of the bank's equity. This increased the bank's core tier 1 capital ratio towards 9%, the level mandated by the European Banking Authority.
- In early 2013 CPB renamed its Greek branches to CPB Bank and on 26 March the bank sold them to Piraeus Bank. Laiki underwent structural reorganization, where its main commercial network was merged with Bank of Cyprus, while its asset management and private banking divisions were transformed and preserved under special governance as an autonomous investment division within the group.
- In 2018 European Court dismisses compensation claim in Cyprus 2013 deposit-grab.

== See also ==
- List of banks in Cyprus
