= Sotos Zackheos =

Cypriot diplomat (born 1950/51)

- Born: 1950 or 1951 (age 75–76)
- Education: University of Athens
- Known for: former ambassador and permanent secretary at the foreign ministry
- Board member of: RCB Bank

Sotos Zackheos (born 1950 or 1951) is a Cypriot former ambassador and permanent secretary at the foreign ministry.

Sotos Zackheos has bachelor's degrees in Law, and in Economics and Political Sciences, from the University of Athens and a master's degree in Political Science.

Zackheos is a member of the board of directors of RCB Bank, formerly known as Russian Commercial Bank (Cyprus).

In December 2013, President Nicos Anastasiades appointed Zackheos as the Special Envoy of the President of Cyprus to Russia.
