= Panicos O. Demetriades =

Cypriot economist

Panicos Demetriades

Governor of the Central Bank of Cyprus
- In office 3 May 2012 – 10 April 2014
- Preceded by: Athanasios Orphanides
- Succeeded by: Chrystalla Georghadji

Personal details
- Born: 19 January 1959 (age 67) Limassol, Cyprus
- Education: University of Essex (B.A. 1981), (M.A. 1983); University of Cambridge (PhD 1987)
- Awards: Stevenson Prize in Economics
- Scientific career
- Fields: Financial economics

Panicos Onisiphorou Demetriades (Greek: Πανίκος Ονησιφόρου Δημητριάδης; born 19 January 1959 in Limassol, Cyprus) is a Cypriot economist and currently the Emeritus Professor of Financial Economics at the University of Leicester. From 3 May 2012 to 10 April 2014, Demetriades was a European Central Bank Governing Council member and the Governor of the Central Bank of Cyprus. According to RePEC he is in the top 2% of economic authors in Europe. He is the author of "A Diary of the Euro Crisis in Cyprus: Lessons for Bank Recovery and Resolution", a book describing his experience as governor of the central bank of Cyprus during the banking crisis that hit the country in 2011–2013.

== Biography ==
From 1978 to 1981, he studied economics at the University of Essex where he graduated with first-class honours. He continued his studies at Essex where in 1982 he completed his MA in economics, graduating with distinction. Between 1982 and 1987 he studied for a PhD at Cambridge University under the supervision of Frank Hahn and Hashem Pesaran. The title of his thesis was "Essays on the Costs of Inflation". During his studies at Cambridge Demetriades won the Stevenson Prize in Economics, awarded in recognition of his work on the relationship between the level and variability of inflation. In 2011, Demetriades was elected Fellow of the Academy of Social Sciences of the United Kingdom (FAcSS).

== Career ==
After obtaining his PhD he worked for 5 years in the Economic Research Department at the Central Bank of Cyprus. In 1990 he left the Central Bank and joined the Department of Economics at Keele University where in 1996 he became Reader in Economics. In 1997 he left Keele and joined South Bank University as Professor of Financial Economics and remained there for 3 years. In 2000 he was appointed to his current post as Professor of Financial Economics at the University of Leicester.

Demetriades was appointed to a five-year term as governor of the Central Bank of Cyprus on 3 May 2012. The post involves membership of the European Central Bank's Governing Council, the independent body responsible for monetary policy in the euro area. Demetriades, resigned from this post in April 2014, following tensions with the government of Nicos Anastasiades, which was elected to handle the country's bailout in March 2013. His early departure from office was viewed as a blow to central bank independence in Europe.

== Academic research ==
Demetriades's academic work focuses on the relationship between finance and growth as well as the interactions between public and private capital and productivity. His early work on finance and growth challenged the view that growth in the financial system is, by itself, sufficient to deliver more economic growth and emphasised the importance of good institutions. Moreover, he has shown that, where present, the contribution of the banking sector to growth is more significant than that of equity finance through the stock market. More recent work has challenged widely held views about government owned banks by showing that, far from acting as an obstacle to growth, such banks can actually enhance both financial and economic development. His work on public capital contradicts the 'crowding out' argument often used by mainstream economists to justify cuts in public spending and reduce the size of government. Specifically, he shows that public investment can actually promote the productivity of the private sector and stimulate trade, employment and long run growth. In this sense, his work has a distinctly Keynesian flavour, influenced by new Keynesians such as Joseph Stiglitz. Although his work can be classified as macroeconomics, he also utilises both micro-data and micro-econometrics. His academic work has been influential, as evidenced by over 8,000 citations in Google Scholar. According to the RePEc rankings, he is ranked among the top 1% of the world's most widely read economists as well as the top 5% of economic authors worldwide based on criteria like average rank score, number of works number of distinct works, number of citations etc.

== Selected academic articles ==
- "The Changing Face of Financial Development", with Peter L. Rousseau, Economics Letters, Elsevier, vol. 141(C), pages 87–90, 2015
- "Why Do African Banks Lend so Little?", with Svetlana Andrianova and Badi H. Baltagi and David Fielding, Oxford Bulletin of Economics and Statistics, Department of Economics, University of Oxford, vol. 77(3), pages 339–359, 06, 2015
- "Financial Restraints And Private Investment: Evidence From A Nonstationary Panel", with Mauro Costantini and Gregory A. James and Kevin C. Lee, Economic Inquiry, Western Economic Association International, vol. 51(1), pages 248–259, 01, 2013
- "Government ownership of banks, institutions and economic growth", with S Andrianova, Economica, London School of Economics and Political Science, vol. 79(315), pages 449–469, 07, 2012
- "Sources and legitimacy of financial liberalization", with Burgoon, Brian and Underhill, Geoffrey R.D., European Journal of Political Economy, Elsevier, vol. 28(2), pages 147–161, 2012
- "Political Economy Origins of Financial Development in Europe and Asia", with S.Andrianova and C.Xu, World Development doi:10.1016/j.worlddev.2010.10.001, 2010
- "Financial Development and Openness: Evidence from Panel Data", with B.Baltagi and S.H.Law, Journal of Development Economics, Vol 89, 2009
- "Government Ownership of Banks, Institutions and Financial Development", with S.Andrianova and A.Shortland, Journal of Development Economics, Vol 85, 2009
- "Monetary Policy and the Exchange Rate during the Asian Crisis: Identification through Heteroskedasticity", with A.Cipollini and G. Carpole, Journal of International Money and Finance, Vol 24, 2005
- "Finance and growth: what we know and what we need to know", with S Andrianova, Financial Development and Economic Growth, 38–65, 2004
- "International Aspects of Public Infrastructure Investment", with S.Bougheas and E.Morgenroth, Canadian Journal of Economics, Vol 36, No 4, 2003
- "Financial Restraints in the South Korean Miracle", with K.Luintel, Journal of Development Economics, Vol 64, No 2, April, 2001
- "Financial Development and Economic Growth: the Role of Stock Markets", with P.Arestis and K.Luintel, Journal of Money, Credit and Banking, Vol 33, No 1, 2001
- "Intertemporal Output and Employment Effects of Public Infrastructure Capital: Evidence from 12 OECD Economies", with T. Mamuneas, The Economic Journal, Vol 110, No 465, 2000
- "Infrastructure, Transport Costs and Trade", with S.Bougheas and E. Morgenroth, Journal of International Economics, Vol 47, No 1, 1999
- "The Direct Costs of Financial Repression: Evidence from India", with K.Luintel, The Review of Economics and Statistics, Vol 79, No 2, 1997
- "Financial Development and Economic Growth: Assessing the Evidence", with P.Arestis, The Economic Journal, Vol 107, 1997
- "Does Financial Development Cause Economic Growth: Time Series Evidence from 16 Countries", with K.Hussein, Journal of Development Economics, Vol 51, No2, 1996
