= RCB Bank =

Former bank in Cyprus

- Industry: Banking, financial services
- Founded: 1995
- Defunct: licence withdrawn December 2022
- Headquarters: Limassol, Cyprus
- Key people: Christakis Santis (chairman); Kirill Zimarin (CEO)

RCB Bank (formerly Russian Commercial Bank) was an international bank founded in 1995 and headquartered in Limassol, Cyprus.

== Background ==
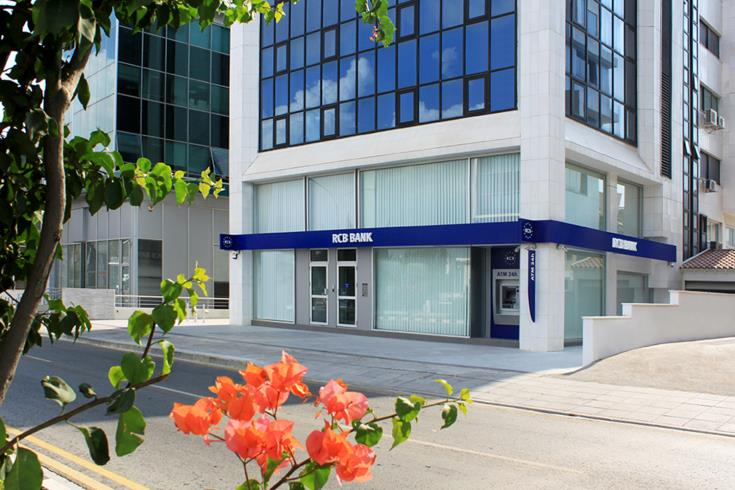
RCB branch in Nicosia

In 1963, the London-based Moscow Narodny Bank established a branch in Beirut for foreign trade and export support from the USSR to Middle Eastern countries. In 1985, during the height of the Libyan–U.S. crisis, the Beirut branch closed and some staff members and documents were transferred to Cyprus, where it received its papers from the State Bank of the USSR in 1989. It was later transferred to the Russian VTB Bank, becoming a full subsidiary of VTB in August 1995. In 2002, VTB owned the controlling stake in RCB Bank and also had controlling stakes in the Vienna-based Donau Bank and the Luxembourg-based East-West United Bank. By 2005, VTB controlled 100% of RCB Bank.

== History ==
RCB Bank was founded in 1995 under the name Russian Commercial Bank (Cyprus), which changed to simply RCB Bank in November 2013. The bank was based in Limassol, with branches in Nicosia and nine other locations across Cyprus. It also had branches in Luxembourg and representative offices in Moscow and London.

The bank's chairman was Greek-Cypriot banker Christakis Santis, while Russian banker Kirill Zimarin was its CEO. Other board of directors members included English-Cypriot economist Sir Christopher Pissarides, Greek-Cypriot former foreign minister Erato Kozakou-Marcoullis, Greek-Cypriot former attorney general Petros Clerides, Greek-Cypriot former permanent secretary at the ministries of finance and justice Andreas Tryfonides, and Greek-Cypriot former ambassador and permanent secretary at the foreign ministry Sotos Zackheos.

In November 2014, RCB Bank was categorized as a significant bank under European Banking Supervision. RCB Bank was a partner of the European Investment Bank and the European Investment Fund in financing investment projects implemented with the EU funds in Cyprus.

In August 2017, Zimarin increased his ownership of RCB to 49.9% by acquiring a 19.85% stake in the Russian Otkritie Financial Corporation Bank.

In February 2022, VTB Bank sold its shares in RCB to Cypriot shareholders in the midst of economic effects caused by Russia's invasion of Ukraine, thus making the bank entirely Cypriot-owned for the first time.

In line with the voluntary decision of the shareholders of RCB to wind down banking operations, the ECB/CBC approved the withdrawal of the banking license of RCB on 22 December 2022. The bank has ceased to trade.

== Controversies ==
=== The Cyprus Papers ===
In 2025, it was reported that leaked Cypriot government reports showed how RCB helped two of its Ukrainian clients obtain Cypriot passports, despite having close business partnerships with sanctioned Russian entities. According to media reports, RCB helped Makar Paseniuk and Konstantin Stetsenko, founders of Ukrainian firm Investment Capital Ukraine (ICU), obtain their Cypriot citizenship.

== See also ==
- Tomas Alibegov
- List of banks in Cyprus
