= Billion Dollar Day =

- Genre: Documentary
- Narrated by: Hugh Sykes
- Country of origin: United Kingdom
- Original language: English

Production
- Executive producer: Jonathan Crane
- Producer: Robert Thirkell
- Production locations: London, New York, Hong Kong
- Running time: 28 minutes
- Production company: BBC

Original release
- Network: BBC 2
- Release: 1986

Related
- Part of documentary series Commercial Breaks

Billion Dollar Day is a documentary about currency trading created by the British Broadcasting Corporation on 4 June 1985. The documentary focuses on three traders, each located in New York, London, and Hong Kong. The traders are followed throughout a typical day in order to demonstrate the challenges and dedication of each trader.

More than a Billion is exchanged during the course of 24 hours while trading GBP, USD, and German Marks. The documentary is considered a landmark in International Business Schools and currency trading circles.
