= CPB Bank =

Greek branch of Cyprus Popular Bank

- Company type: Anonymi Etairia
- Industry: Financial services
- Defunct: March 2013
- Area served: Greece
- Number of employees: 2,700 (2009)
- Website: www.cpb.gr

CPB Bank was the Greek branch of Cyprus Popular Bank. The bank was founded under the name Marfin Egnatia Bank. It was formed by the consolidation of Marfin Investment Group's Egnatia, Laiki and Marfin Banks and was a 95%-owned subsidiary of Marfin Popular Bank (later renamed to Cyprus Popular Bank). In 2011 it was converted to a branch of Cyprus Popular Bank. In early 2013, the bank was renamed Laiki Bank only to change its name once again in March of the same year to CPB Bank. On 26 March 2013 its liabilities and assets were bought by Piraeus Bank.

== See also ==
- List of banks in Greece
