= 2012–2013 Cypriot financial crisis =

Economic crisis in the Republic of Cyprus

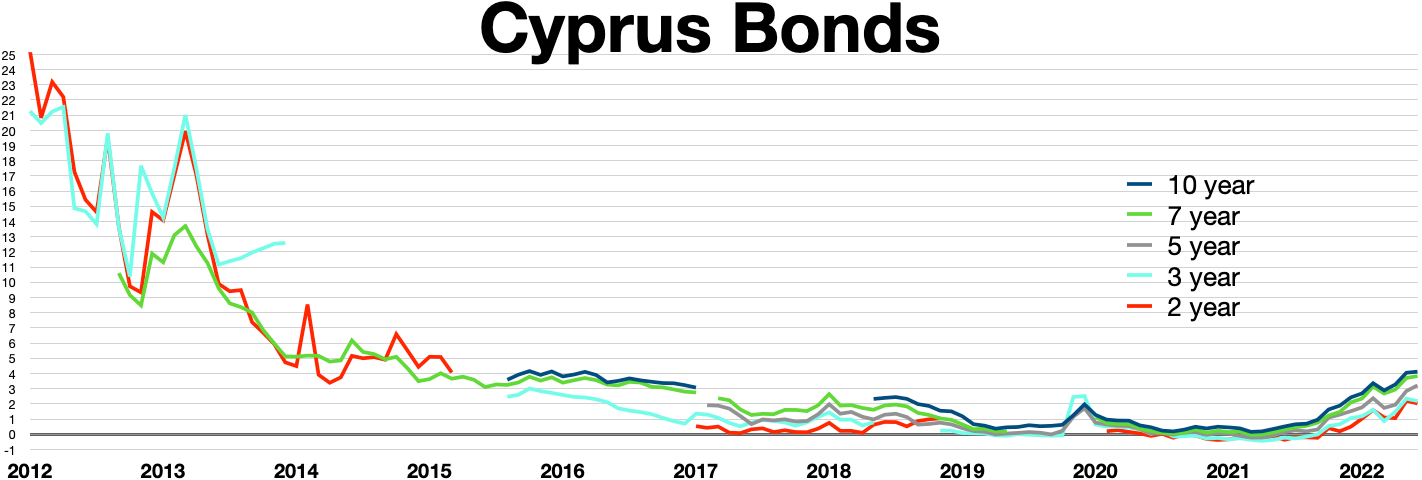
Cyprus bonds yield 10 year 7 year 5 year 3 year 2 year

The 2012–2013 Cypriot financial crisis was an economic crisis in the Republic of Cyprus that involved the exposure of Cypriot banks to overleveraged local property companies, the Greek government-debt crisis, the downgrading of the Cypriot government's bond credit rating to junk status by international credit rating agencies, the consequential inability to refund its state expenses from the international markets and the reluctance of the government to restructure the troubled Cypriot financial sector.

On 25 March 2013, a €10 billion international bailout by the Eurogroup, European Commission (EC), European Central Bank (ECB), and International Monetary Fund (IMF) was announced, in return for Cyprus agreeing to close the country's second-largest bank, the Cyprus Popular Bank (also known as Laiki Bank), imposing a one-time bank deposit levy on all uninsured deposits there, and seizing possibly around 48% of uninsured deposits in the Bank of Cyprus (the island's largest commercial bank). A minority proportion of those deposits was from citizens of other countries (many of them from Russia), who preferred Cypriot banks because of their higher interest on bank account deposits, relatively low corporate tax, and easier access to the rest of the European banking sector. This resulted in numerous insinuations by US and European media who presented Cyprus as a "tax haven" and suggested that the prospective bailout loans were meant for saving the accounts of Russian depositors. No insured deposit of €100,000 or less would be affected, though 47.5% of all bank deposits above €100,000 were seized.

Nearly one-third of Rossiya Bank's cash ($1 billion) was frozen in Cypriot accounts during this crisis.

== Context ==
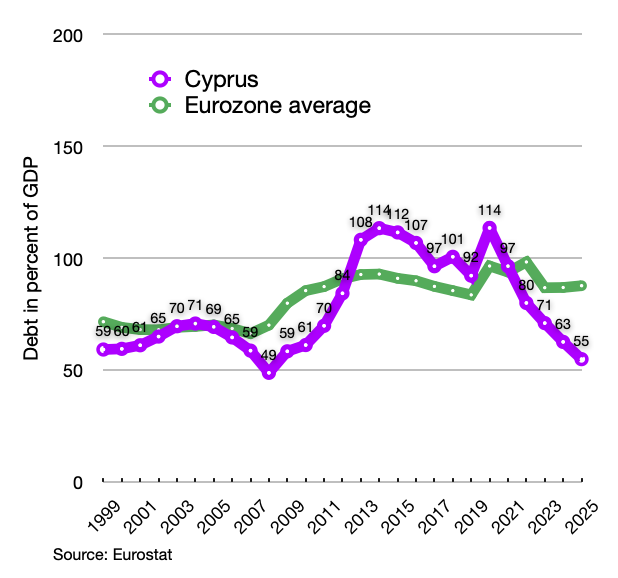
Cyprus's debt-to-GDP percentage compared to Eurozone average since 1999

The United States' subprime mortgage crisis in 2007–2008 led to a domino effect of negative consequences in the global economy including the European Union. The Cypriot economy went into recession in 2009, as the economy shrank by 1.67%, with large falls specifically in the tourism and shipping sectors which caused rising unemployment. Economic growth between 2010 and 2012 was weak and failed to reach its pre-2009 levels. Commercial property values declined by approximately 30%. Non-performing loans rose to a reported 6.1% in 2011, increasing pressure on the banking system. With a small population and modest economy, Cyprus had a large offshore banking industry. Compared to a nominal GDP of €19.5bn ($24bn) the banks had amassed €22 billion of Greek private-sector debt with bank deposits of $120bn, including $60bn from Russian corporations. Russian oligarch Dmitry Rybolovlev owned a 10% stake in the Bank of Cyprus.

Cyprus banks first came under severe financial pressure as bad debt ratios rose. Former Laiki CEO Efthimios Bouloutas admitted that his bank was probably insolvent as early as 2008, even before Cyprus entered the Eurozone. The banks were then exposed to a haircut of upwards of 50% in 2011, during the Greek government-debt crisis, leading to fears of a collapse of the Cypriot banks. The Cypriot state, unable to raise liquidity from the markets to support its financial sector, requested a bailout from the European Union.

Progress on fiscal and structural reforms was slow. After a serious accidental explosion in July 2011 at the Evangelos Florakis Naval Base, the major credit rating agencies downgraded the country's rating in September. Yields on its long-term bonds rose above 12% and there was concern that the country would be unable to stabilize its banks.

== Response ==
=== Emergency loan (2012) ===
Since January 2012, Cyprus had been relying on a €2.5bn (US$3.236 billion) emergency loan from Russia to cover its budget deficit and refinance maturing debt. The loan had an interest rate of 4.5%, with no amortization/repayment until its maturity after 4.5 years, and no penalty if repayment at that point of time was delayed because Cyprus still lacked access to the normal funding markets. The received loan was expected to cover all refinancing of maturing government debt and the amount needed for the government's continued budget deficits, until the first quarter of 2013. But the received loan did not include any funds for the recapitalization of the Cypriot financial sector. Looking further ahead, it was generally expected Cyprus would need to apply for an additional bailout loan.

=== Later responses ===
On March 18, 2013, Cyprus closed all banks due to concerns regarding a likely bank run with a reopening planned for after the scheduled 25 March holiday.

Later that week, the Eurozone revived a previously offered alternative proposal that would require the merging of Laiki and the Bank of Cyprus, the creation of a new bank for all deposits under €100,000, and the creation of a bad bank. This plan would imply lower recapitalization costs. However, the plan was opposed by president Nicos Anastasiades, who dubbed the plan the "Icelandic solution", due to potential negative effects on the uninsured deposits that would be placed into the bad bank as it could wipe out up to 40% of their value. Anastasiades refused to agree to potential losses on large deposits, many held by Russians, in contrast to the Europeans who saw them as necessary haircuts. German negotiators in fact believed that Laiki and the Bank of Cyprus were already de facto insolvent and would need to be bailed-in by part of these large deposits.

On March 19, his government shut down a parliamentary session that was due to debate a bank resolution law (i.e. the restructuring of a bank by an external authority to that preserves its critical functions and provides financial stability), as Cyprus did not have a legal structure to close failed banks. Infighting amongst politicians was blamed for the delay, although official sources claimed the legal department of the parliament had not finished drafting the laws.

In response to the Eurozone plan, which was supported but not 'fully backed' by the European Commission, the Cypriot government proposed an alternative plan that would raise funds by nationalizing the state pension fund and issuing emergency bonds backed by future revenues. This plan, however, was rejected by the EU and the IMF.

On March 21, the ECB announced it would stop emergency Eurosystem low-cost loans to Cypriot banks on the 25th. Additionally, the Financial Times reported that EU officials such as Olli Rehn, European Commissioner for Economic Affairs, and Jeroen Dijsselbloem, president of the Eurogroup, were now convinced that "massive capital flight" was unavoidable and thus overcome their previous opposition to the Icelandic solution.

== Criticism ==
- Irish MEP Nessa Childers, daughter of the country's former President Erskine H. Childers, painted a bleak picture. She described the efforts of the EU-IMF as an "incompetent mess" and said the Eurozone was more destabilised as a result.
- In its "Schumpeter" blog, The Economist called the Cyprus bail-out "unfair, short-sighted, and self-defeating".

== Local reaction ==
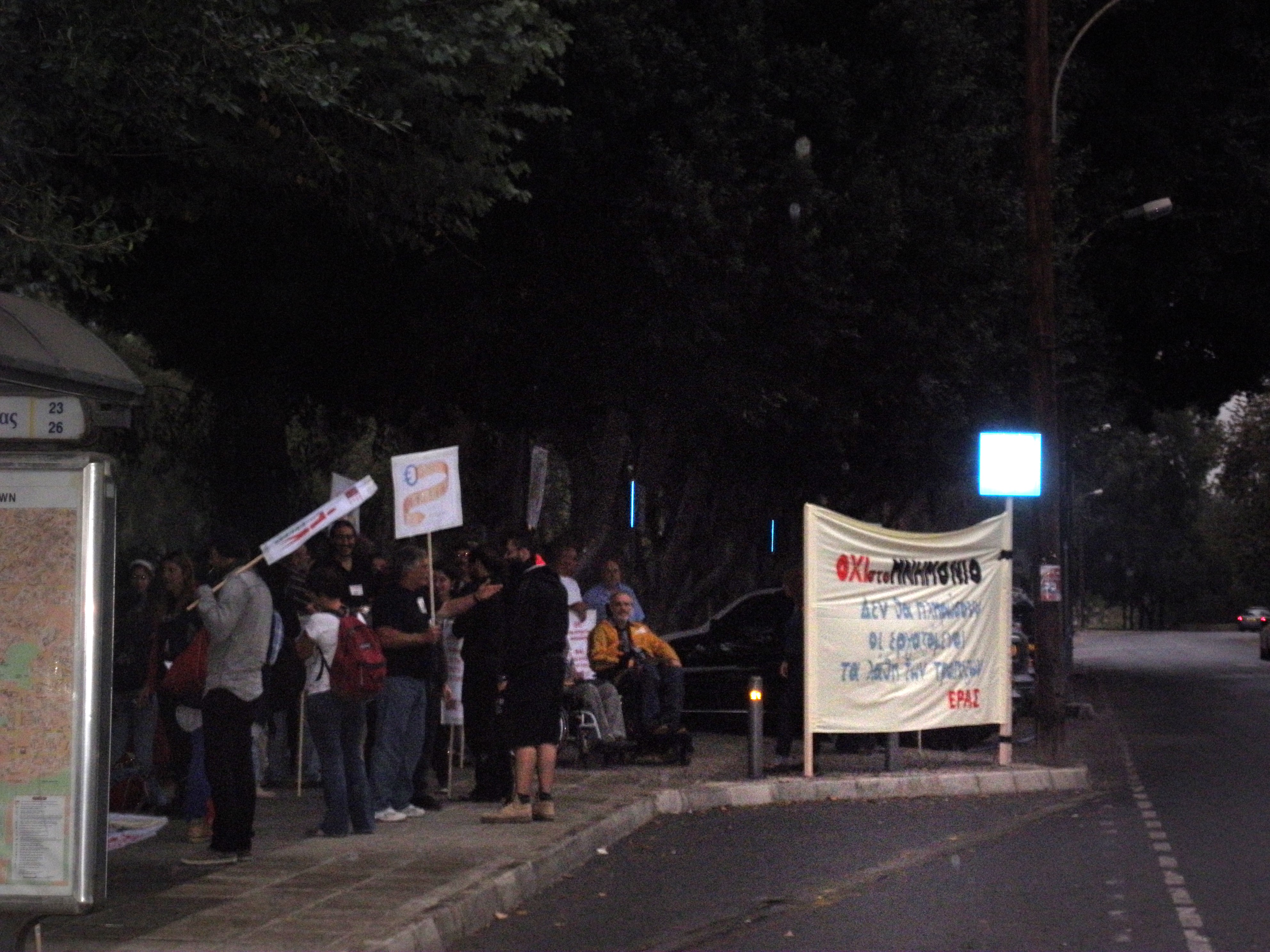
Members of ERAS outside of the House of Representatives in Nicosia

Cyprus has seen a number of reactions and responses towards the austerity measures of the bailout plan. On 8 November 2012, the Cypriot far-left party Committee for a Radical Left Rally (ERAS) organized the first protest against austerity while the Troika negotiations were still taking place. Protesters were gathered outside the House of Representatives holding banners and shouting slogans against austerity. Leaflets with alternative proposals for the economy were distributed in the protest, with proposals including the nationalization of banking, the reduction of the army and the freezing of the army budget, and the increase of the corporate tax. Members of the New Internationalist Left (NEDA) also participated in the protest.

On 14 November, NEDA organised an anti-austerity protest outside the Ministry of Finance in Nicosia together with the Alliance Against the Memorandum. In the protest NEDA gave out leaflets, which expressed the view that "the EU is trying to burden the workers with the debts from the collapse of the bankers" and that "if this happens, the Cypriot economy and the future of the new generations will then be mortgaged to local and foreign profiteers and usurious bankers."

Contract teachers protested outside the House of Representatives on 29 November against austerity measures that would leave 992 of them without a job next year. The teachers stormed the building and bypassed the policemen, entering the House chamber. The teachers shouted against the banks and poverty. A protest by investors was staged on the morning of 11 December outside the House of Representatives, with protesters again storming the House and bypassing the police. The protest interrupted the discussions of the House's committee of customs. The protesters were asked to leave so that the committee could continue its work, and the protesters left half an hour later.

A number of protests took place on 12 December. Members of large families protested outside the House of Representatives against cuts in the benefits given by the state to support large families. Protesters threw eggs and stones at the main entrance of the House, and a number of protesters tried to enter the building, but were blocked by the police force that arrived to handle the protest. It was reported that a woman fainted during the incidents. The protesters shouted for the Representatives to come out but no response was given.

The protesters were joined by members of KISOA (Cypriot Confederation of Organisations of the Disabled, Κυπριακή Συνομοσπονδία Οργανώσεων Αναπήρων), who marched from the Ministry of Finance to the House of Representatives to protest against cuts in benefits for people with disabilities. Later in the day members of public school teachers' trade unions protested outside the Ministry of Finance against the cuts in education spending which could result in the firing of teachers. The unions staged another protest the next day near the House of Representatives.

Haravgi, a far left-wing newspaper, reported that just before bank deposits were blocked, a number of companies belonging to the family of President Anastasiades have transferred over $21m outside of Cyprus. Anastasiades has denied these allegations. Also a number of loans issued to members of political parties or public administration officers were fully or partially written off.

== Non-EU bank depositors ==
Non-resident investors who held deposits prior to 15 March 2013 when the plan to impose losses on savers was first formulated, and who lost at least €3,000,000, would be eligible to apply for Cypriot citizenship. Cyprus's existing "citizenship by investment" program would be revised to reduce the required amount from €10,000,000 to €3,000,000. "These decisions will be deployed in a fast-track manner", President Anastasiades said in an address to Russian business people in the port city of Limassol in 2013. Other measures were also under consideration, he said, including offering tax incentives for existing or new companies doing business in Cyprus.

== Distressed investing ==
Frozen deposits in Cyprus banks attracted interest from investors and brokers specializing in distressed assets. Among firms reported to be dealing in Cyprus bank debt was London-based Exito Partners (formerly Éxito Capital) and Swiss-based Black Eagle Litigation Fund.

== Analysis ==
A team of 16 Cypriot economists, organized by the citizens group Eleutheria ("Freedom"), attributed the crisis to declining competitiveness and increasing public and private debt, exacerbated by the banking crisis.

== See also ==
- Economic Adjustment Programme for Cyprus
- Inverted yield curve
