= MIG Holdings =

Greek investment company

MIG Holdings S.A.
- Trade name: MIG
- Native name: MIG ΑΝΩΝΥΜΟΣ ΕΤΑΙΡΕΙΑ ΣΥΜΜΕΤΟΧΩΝ
- Formerly: ΙΝΤΕΡΤΥΠ; Comm Group; Marfin Financial Group; Marfin Investment Group
- Type: Public
- Traded as: Athex: MIG
- ISIN: GRS314003005
- Industry: Holding company
- Founded: 10 March 1988; 38 years ago
- Headquarters: Athens, Greece
- Area served: Greece; Serbia
- Key people: Georgios Efstratiadis (CEO); Petros Katsoulas (Chairperson)
- Revenue: €359.84 million (2021)
- Operating income: €13.03 million (2021)
- Net income: €(25.64) million (2021)
- Total assets: €1.222 billion (2021)
- Total equity: €107.61 million (2021)
- Owner: Piraeus Financial Holdings (87.7948%)
- Number of employees: 2,151 (2022)
- Subsidiaries: Robne kuće Beograd
- Website: www.migholdingssa.com/en/

MIG Holdings S.A. (also known as MIG) is a Greek investment company. It has acquired several companies and has changed name several times since. In 2004 it took the name Marfin Financial Group following the triple merger of Comm Group, Marfin Classic Α.Ε.Ε.Χ and Maritime and Financial Investments.

Its shares are currently listed on the Athens Stock Exchange.

== History ==
=== Finance history ===
In 2006 the Dubai Group bought a 35% stake in the company. As of 31 August 2012, 17.28% of MIG is owned by Dubai Group. In 2006 Marfin Investment Group acquired HSBC's shares in the now-defunct Laiki Bank, establishing a strong minority share position. Subsequently, the group acquired control of Laiki, which it re-branded as Marfin Popular Bank.

On 17 March 2008, MIG announced it sold its 20% of Greek telecommunications company OTE to Deutsche Telekom.

On 6 March 2009, MIG won the deal to acquire Olympic Airlines making it a private airline. The airline was renamed Olympic Air soon after. On 22 February 2010, Olympic Air and main competitor Aegean Airlines announced they had reached an agreement to merge their operations, phasing out the Aegean brand. After an in depth inquiry by the European competitions commission, it was announced on 26 January 2011 that the merger was blocked, citing anticompetitive concerns. Following a renewed attempt to sell the company to Aegean Airlines and the subsequent approval by the Competition Commissioner on 10 October 2013, the airline is, as of 23 October 2013, a full subsidiary of Aegean Airlines.

In December 2009, MIG announced their intention in purchasing Serbian airline Jat Airways with an eventual merger with Olympic Air.

=== Arson attack on Athens branch ===
On May 5, 2010 during anti-austerity demonstrations, an arson attack by unidentified perpetrators took place against the bank's branch on Stadiou Street, Athens. 3 people died and in a trial that ended in 2013, several people in management positions were found guilty of the negligent homicide of three employees, the bodily harm of 21 other employees, and multiple lapses in fire safety measures and training of the staff.

== Holdings ==
As of 2023, MIG's principal equity holdings consisted of:)

- (Serbia) Robne kuće Beograd (83.11% owned)
