= Petros Christodoulou =

Greek economist and banker (born 1960)

Non-executive Chairman of Eurobank Limited
- Incumbent
- Assumed office September 2025

Deputy Chief Executive Officer of the National Bank of Greece
- In office 28 June 2012 – July 2014

General Manager of the Public Debt Management Agency
- In office 25 February 2010 – June 2012

Personal details
- Born: 1960 (age 65–66)
- Education: Athens University of Economics and Business; Columbia University

Petros Christodoulou (Greek: Πέτρος Χριστοδούλου; born 1960) is a Greek economist and banker.

== Biography ==
Christodoulou was born in 1960. Christodoulou earned his B.Sc. in finance at the Athens University of Economics and Business in 1982, and his MBA from Columbia University in 1985, with a specialization in Finance and Global Markets. After his graduation he worked for Credit Suisse First Boston (CFSB) in London. In 1987 Christodulou joined Goldman Sachs, working as Head of Money Markets Trading in Goldman Sachs London (1987–1988), and Head of Provincial Bond Trading at Goldman Sachs in Canada. In 1989 Christodoulou joined J.P. Morgan in London, working as Head of European Derivatives Trading (1989–1994), and Head of European Proprietary Trading (1994–1995). In 1995 he was promoted to Managing Director, responsible for European Short Term Interest Trading (1995–1997), and emerging markets in Europe and Africa (1997–1998).

From 1998 to 2010, Christodoulou worked for the National Bank of Greece (NBG), initially as the Group Treasurer and later as General Manager of Treasury, Global Markets and Private Banking of NBG. While at NBG, Christodoulou worked closely with his former employer, Goldman Sachs, and Bank of Greece Chairman Lucas Papademos in organizing controversial financial operations which enabled Greece to join the Euro. On 25 February 2010, Prime Minister of Greece George Papandreou appointed Christodoulou General Manager of the Public Debt Management Agency (PDMA). Upon his appointment to the post, the German magazine Der Spiegel referred to Christodoulou as "Greece's Saviour." While General Manager of the PDMA, Christodoulou led the negotiations to restructure the Greek government debt, which resulted in a €106,5 bn debt reduction.

Upon his departure from the PDMA in June 2012, Christodoulou was on 11 June 2012 appointed General Manager of International Activities of the NBG. On 28 June 2012 he was in addition elected an Executive Member of the Board of Directors and Deputy Chief Executive Officer of the NBG. Christodoulou was also Chairman of the NBG's Asset and Liability and the Disclosure and Transparency Committees and a Member of the NBG's Integration Steering Committee and the Risk Management, Strategy, Executive and Provision and Write Off Committees. He has been a Member of the Investment Committee of Ethniki Hellenic General Insurance, the Foundation for Economic and Industrial Research and the board of AEK Athens F.C.

After leaving the National Bank of Greece in 2014, Christodoulou was chief executive officer and chief financial officer of Capital Product Partners from 1 September 2014 until 30 June 2015.

Christodoulou subsequently was a director of Guardian Capital Group from 2016 until 7 July 2026 and as a non-executive director of Aegean Baltic Bank from 2017 until January 2024. He has been on the board of Danaos Corporation since June 2018.

On 8 January 2024, following approval by the European Central Bank, Christodoulou became independent non-executive chairman of Hellenic Bank in Cyprus. Hellenic Bank was renamed Eurobank Limited in September 2025 following its integration with Eurobank Cyprus, and Christodoulou continued as non-executive chairman of the renamed bank.

== See also ==
- Carlos Moedas
- Massimo Tononi
