= Cyprus Development Bank =

Cyprus Development Bank Κυπριακή Τράπεζα Αναπτύξεως
- Company type: Public
- Industry: Finance
- Founded: 1963; 63 years ago
- Headquarters: Nicosia, Cyprus
- Area served: Cyprus
- Key people: Loucas Marangos (CEO), Christodoulos Patsalides (Chairman)
- Products: consumer banking, corporate banking, investment banking, mortgage loans, private banking, wealth management
- Subsidiaries: Novasys Information Services; Investment Bank of Kuban; Enalion Environmental Management Centre; Cdb Capital
- Website: www.cdb.com.cy

The Cyprus Development Bank (CDB), (Κυπριακή Τράπεζα Αναπτύξεως) is a development bank founded in 1963. It was set up as a public company to foster economic advancement in Cyprus. The primary stakeholders initially included the Republic of Cyprus and the European Investment Bank. The bank was privatized in 2008.

== History ==
Established in 1963, the Cyprus Development Bank's early shareholders comprised the Republic of Cyprus and the European Investment Bank.

In June 2007, the Cyprus government began seeking interest for its majority stake in the bank. By 2007, CDB's assets were reported to be at CYP £231 million. By 2008, the bank transitioned to private ownership, marking its departure from state ownership.

The Bank of New York Mellon became the correspondent bank for the Cyprus Development Bank Public Company (cdbbank) in 2024. This partnership aims to enhance cdbbank's services to clients in Cyprus and internationally.

== See also ==
- List of banks in Cyprus
