= John Hourican =

Irish banker

- Born: John Patrick Hourican; 24 July 1970 (age 56); Dublin, Ireland
- Education: National University of Ireland; Dublin City University
- Occupation: Banker
- Title: CEO, NewDay
- Term: September 2019 -
- Predecessor: James Corcoran
- Spouse: Rioghnach Hourican
- Children: 4

John Patrick Hourican (born 24 July 1970) is an Irish banker and businessman, CEO of NewDay since September 2019, and formerly CEO of the Bank of Cyprus from 2013 to 2019.

== Early life and education ==
Hourican was born on 24 July 1970 in Dublin, and has two brothers and three sisters. He graduated with a degree in Economics and Sociology from the National University of Ireland and a postgraduate diploma in Accounting from Dublin City University.

== Career ==
Hourican started his career as an accountant with Price Waterhouse, initially in Dublin, and later in London and Hong Kong. In 1997, he joined the Royal Bank of Scotland.

In 2007, Hourican became chief financial officer of ABN Amro after Royal Bank of Scotland purchased it in October 2007. In 2008, he became chief executive of global banking and markets, a role he served in until 28 February 2013. Hourican quit to "demonstrate responsibility", following RBS's £390 million fine for its involvement in the Libor scandal, although he was not personally implicated. The Independent noted that Hourican "fell on his sword" and that "the City wondered if he could recover his career", but added "it had never been alleged that the head of RBS's investment bank knew about the collusion".

In 2013, John Hourican was named CEO of Bank of Cyprus. At the position, he inflicted losses on depositors and a forced takeover on its smaller rival Cyprus Popular Bank. He cut 1/3 of the bank's balance by unloading bad loans, and brought in 5 billion euros in new deposits.

In April 2015, it was announced that Hourican had resigned for "personal reasons", and would work his four-month notice period. He later decided to extend his contract until September 2019.

In March 2019, he was named CEO of NewDay, succeeding James Corcoran, starting September 2019.

He is currently CFO of CVC Capital Partners PLC.

== Distinctions ==
- Fellow of Chartered Accountants Ireland

== Personal life ==
Hourican and his wife Rioghnach have four children, two boys and two girls.
