= Outline of Cyprus =

Island country in Eurasia

The Flag of Cyprus

The location of Cyprus

Flag-map of Cyprus

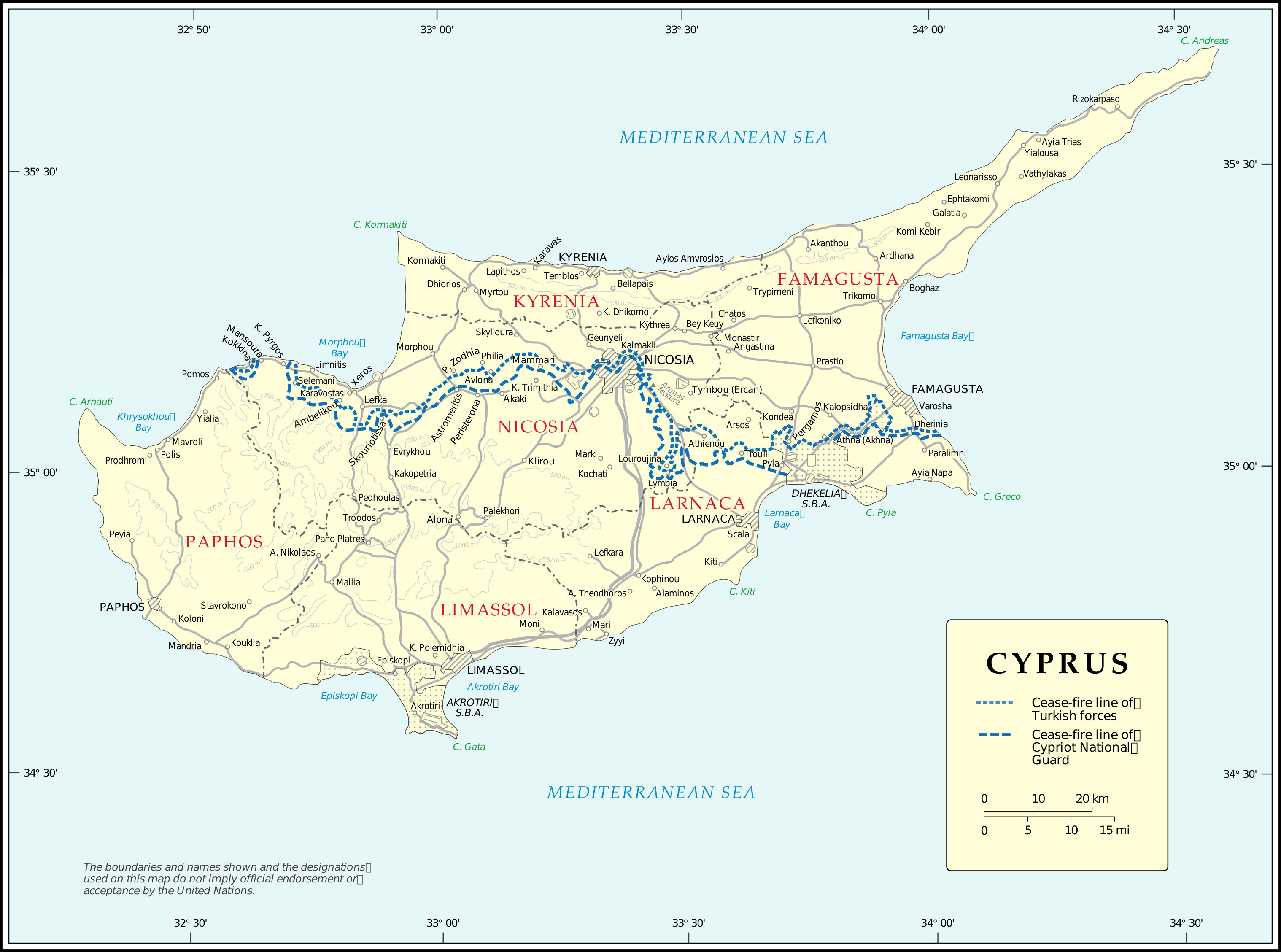
An enlargeable map of the Republic of Cyprus

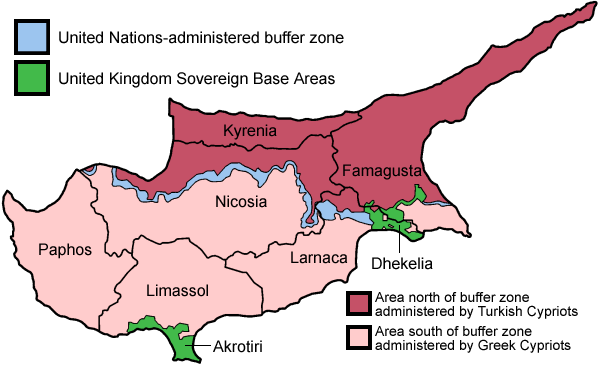
An enlargeable political map of the island of Cyprus

The following outline is provided as an overview of and topical guide to Cyprus:

Cyprus – Eurasian island country located in the Eastern Mediterranean Sea, east of Greece, south of Turkey, west of Syria and Lebanon, northwest of Israel and north of Egypt. Cyprus is the third largest island in the Mediterranean Sea and the Republic of Cyprus is a member state of the European Union.

== General reference ==
A basic map of the island of Cyprus _{Including Green Zone and UK bases}

- Pronunciation:
- Common English country name: Cyprus
- Official English country name: The Republic of Cyprus
- Common endonym(s):
- Official endonym(s):
- Adjectival(s): Cypriot
- Demonym(s):
- Etymology: Name of Cyprus
- International rankings of Cyprus
- ISO country codes: CY, CYP, 196
- ISO region codes: See ISO 3166-2:CY
- Internet country code top-level domain: .cy

== Geography of Cyprus ==
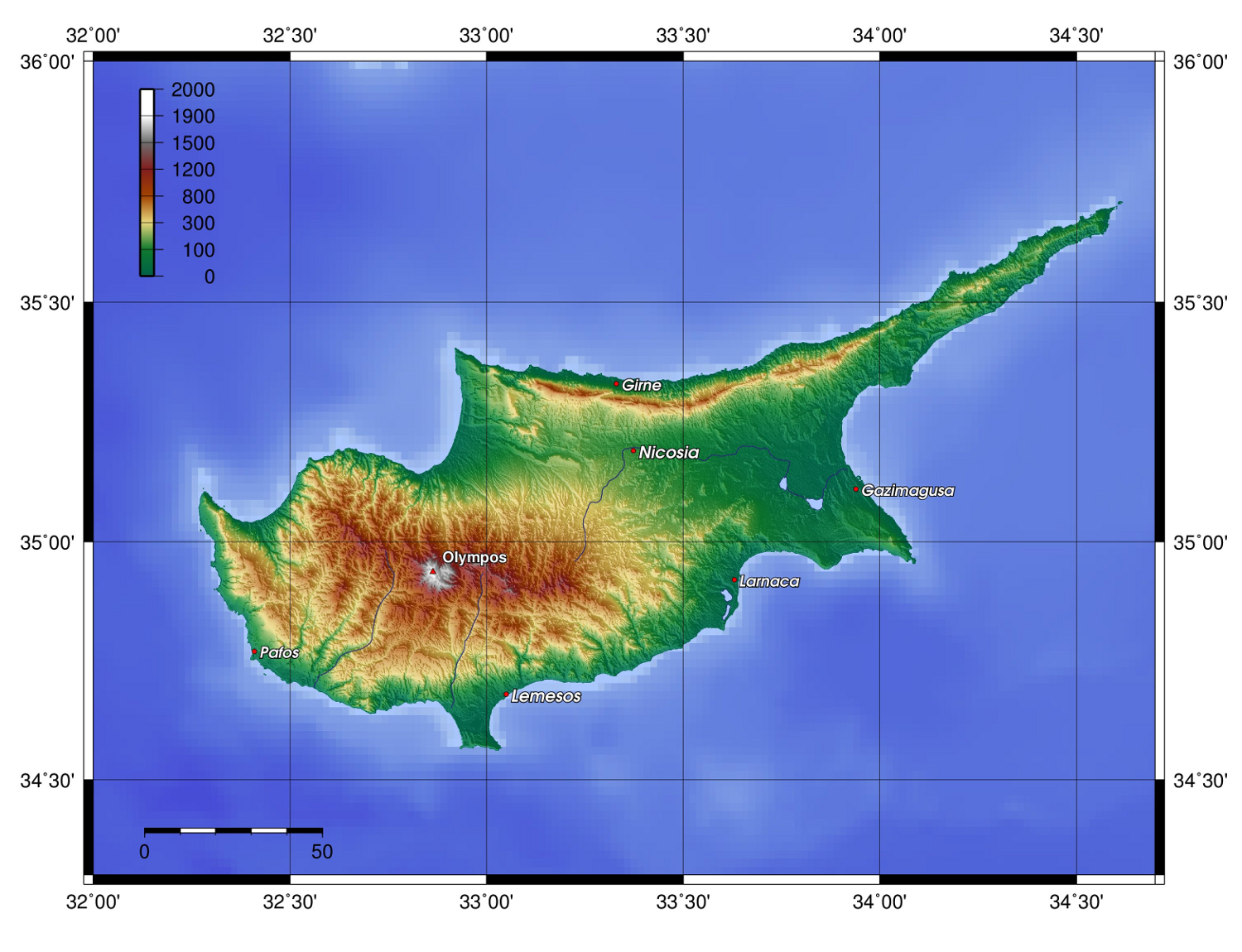
An enlargeable topographic map of the island of Cyprus

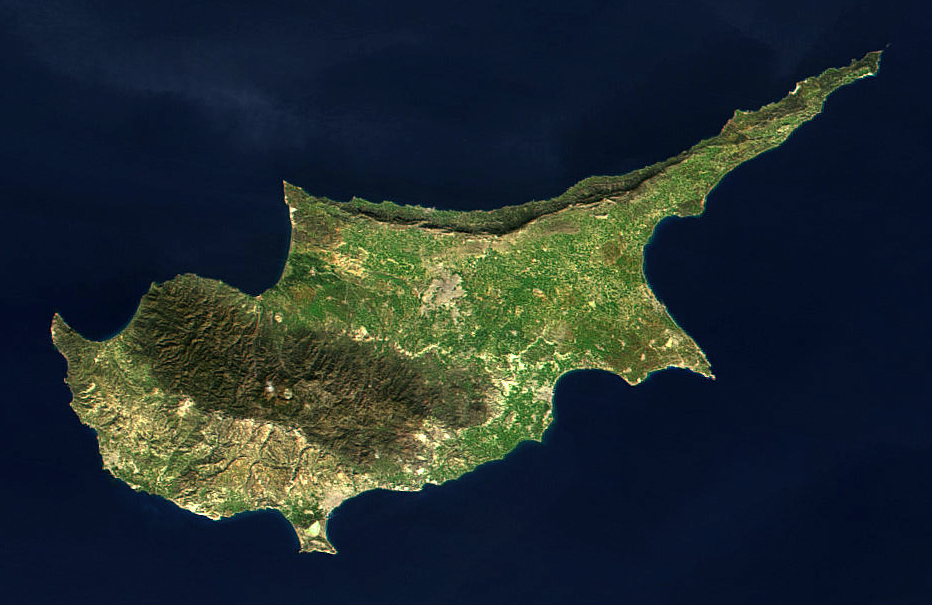
An enlargeable satellite image of the island of Cyprus

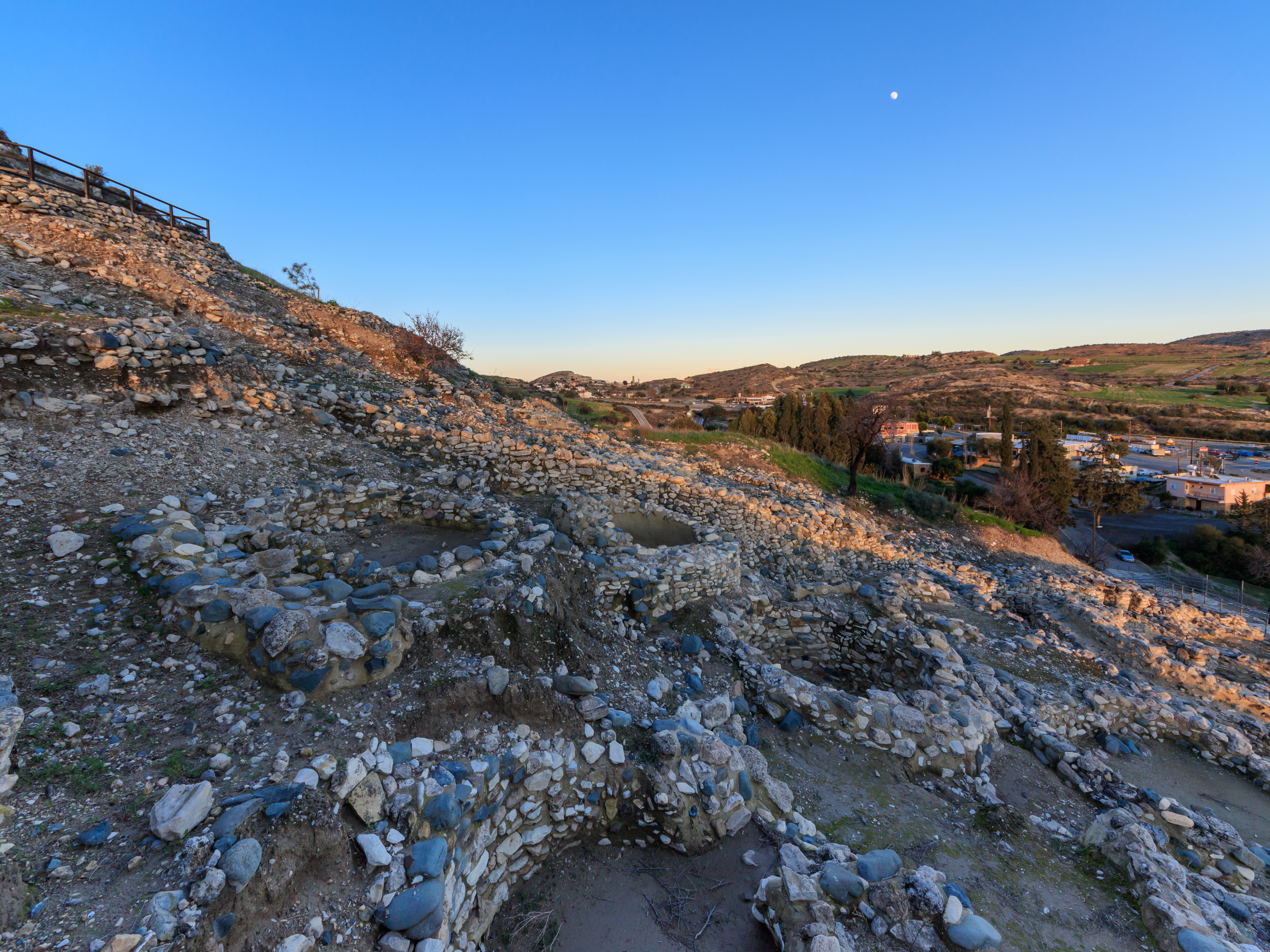
Khirokitia, listed as a World Heritage Site by UNESCO since 1998

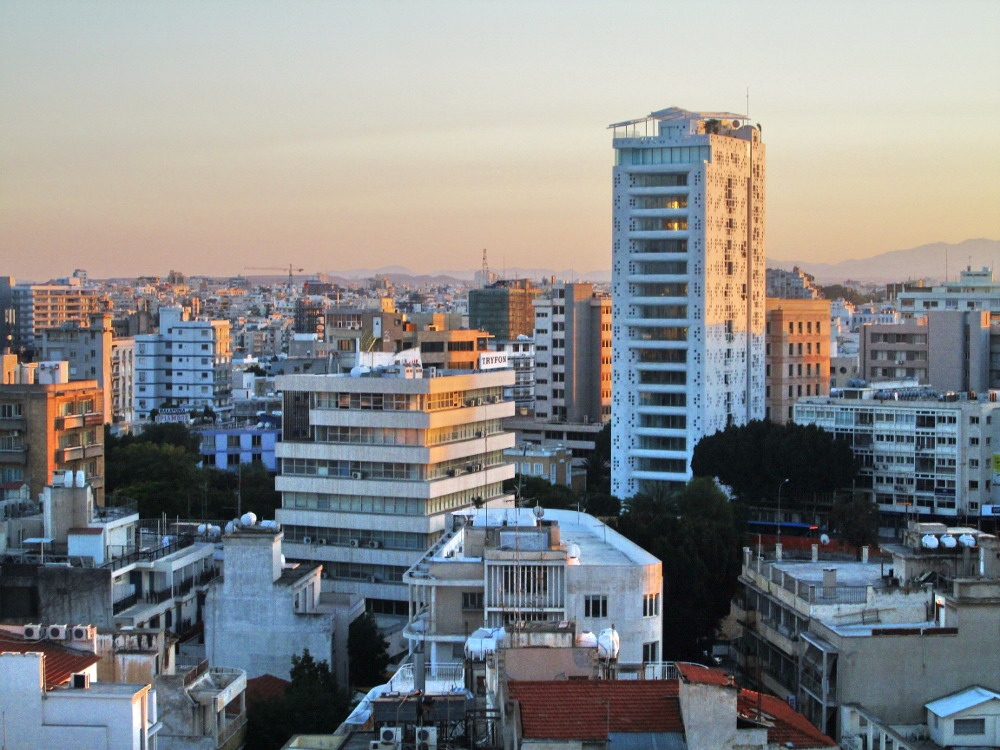
View of Nicosia at sunset

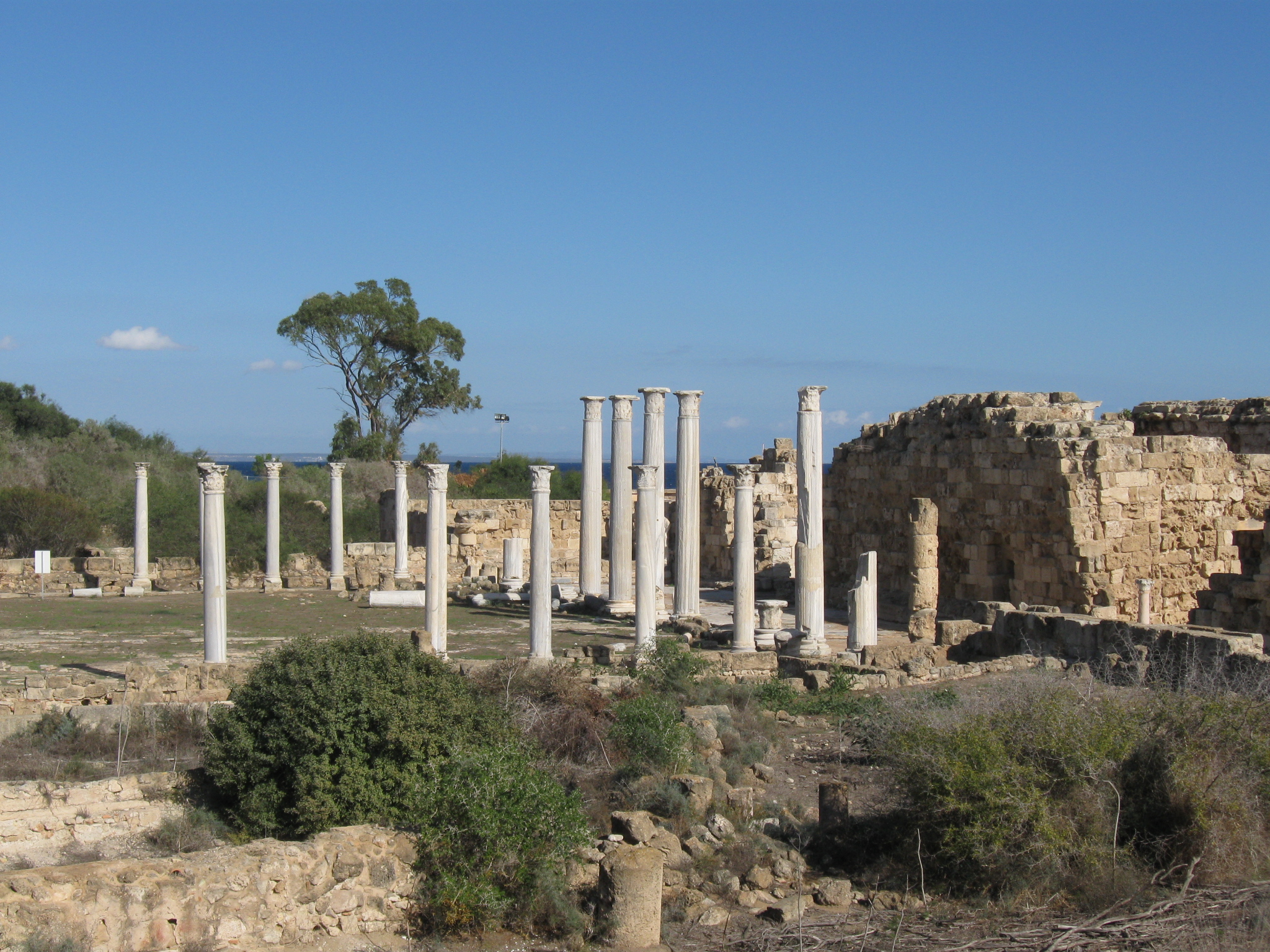
The gymnasium at Salamis, one of the Ten city-kingdoms of Cyprus

- Cyprus is: an island country
- Location:
  - Northern Hemisphere and Eastern Hemisphere
  - Atlantic Ocean
    - Mediterranean Sea
  - Eurasia (though not on the mainland)
    - Asia
      - Western Asia
  - Mediterranean Basin
  - Time zone: Eastern European Time (UTC+02), Eastern European Summer Time (UTC+03)
    - Date and time notation in Cyprus
  - Extreme points of Cyprus
    - High: Mount Olympus 1,951 m (6,401 ft)
    - Low: Mediterranean Sea 0 m
  - Land boundaries: 150 km

Dhekelia SBA 103 km
Akrotiri SBA 47 km

- Coastline: 648 km

- Population of Cyprus: 794,600 (January 1, 2008) - 154th most populous country
- Area of Cyprus: 9,251 km^{2}
- Atlas of Cyprus

=== Environment of Cyprus ===
- Climate of Cyprus
- Solar power in Cyprus
- Cyprus Mediterranean forests
- Wildlife of Cyprus
  - Flora of Cyprus
  - Fauna of Cyprus
    - Birds of Cyprus
    - Mammals of Cyprus

==== Natural geographic features of Cyprus ====
- Dams and reservoirs in Cyprus
- Islands of Cyprus
- Mountains of Cyprus
  - Kyrenia Mountains
  - Troodos Mountains
- Rivers of Cyprus
- World Heritage Sites in Cyprus

=== Regions of Cyprus ===
==== Administrative divisions of Cyprus ====
- Districts of Cyprus

===== Districts of Cyprus =====
District	Capital Seat
Nicosia	Nicosia
Limassol	Limassol
Larnaca	Larnaca
Paphos	Paphos
Famagusta	Famagusta
Kyrenia	Kyrenia

===== Municipalities of Cyprus =====
- Capital of Cyprus: Nicosia
- Cities of Cyprus
  - Ten city-kingdoms of Cyprus

== Government and politics of Cyprus ==
Politics of Cyprus

- Form of government: presidential representative democratic republic
- Capital of Cyprus: Nicosia
- Elections in Cyprus
- Political ideologies in Cyprus
  - Liberalism in Cyprus
- Political issues in Cyprus
  - Corruption in Cyprus
  - Reduction of military conscription in Cyprus
- Political parties in Cyprus
- Taxation in Cyprus

=== Branches of the government of Cyprus ===
Government of Cyprus

==== Executive branch of the government of Cyprus ====
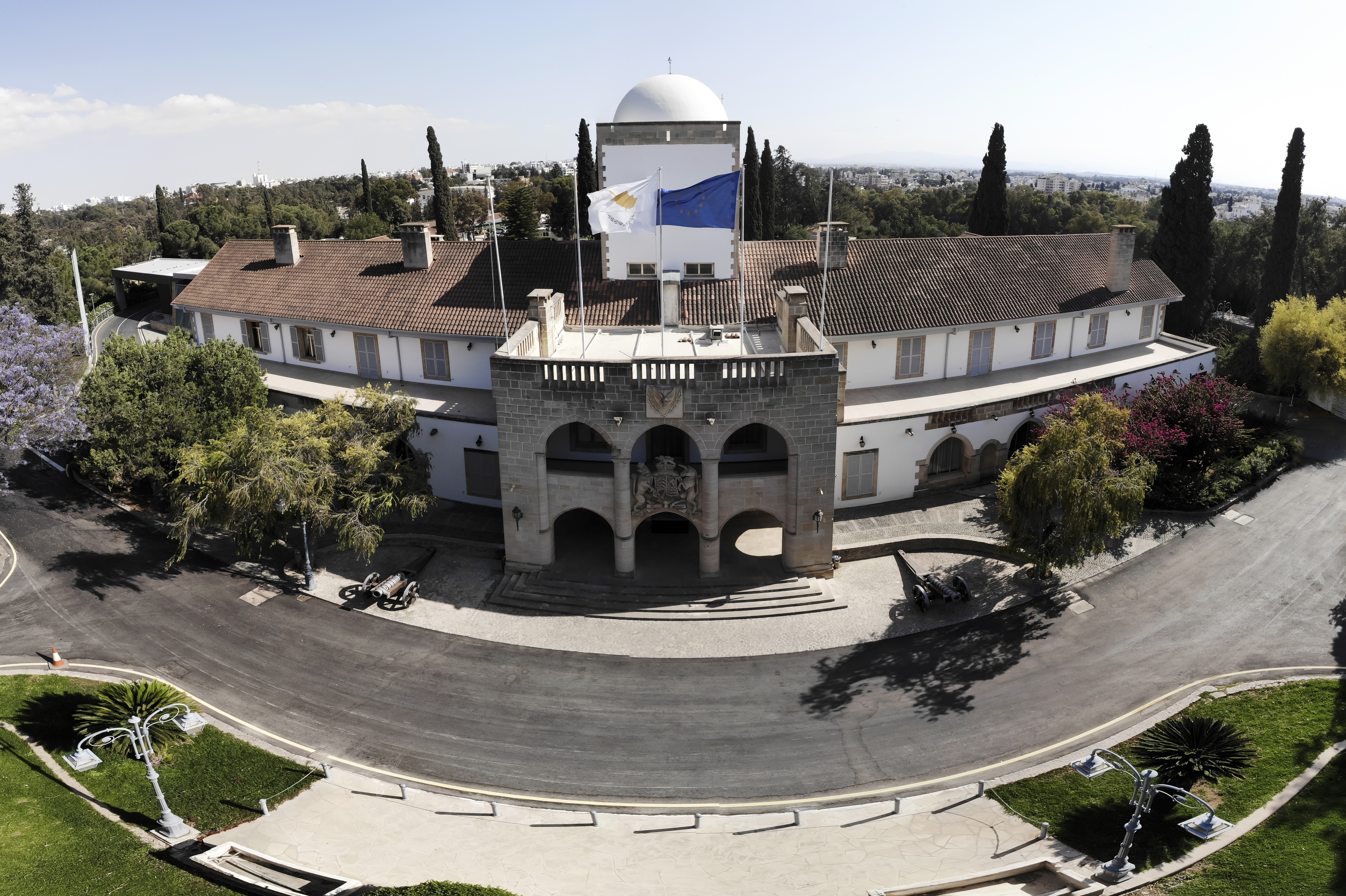

- Head of state & government: President of Cyprus, Dimitris Christofias
  - Vice President of Cyprus
- Cabinet of Cyprus
  - List of ministers of communications and works of Cyprus
  - List of ministers of defence of Cyprus
  - List of ministers of education and culture of Cyprus
  - List of ministers of finance of Cyprus
  - List of ministers of foreign affairs of Cyprus
  - List of ministers of labour and social insurance of Cyprus

==== Legislative branch of the government of Cyprus ====
- Parliament of Cyprus (unicameral)
  - House of Representatives of Cyprus

==== Judicial branch of the government of Cyprus ====
Court system of Cyprus

- Supreme Court of Cyprus

=== Foreign relations of Cyprus ===
- Diplomatic missions in Cyprus
- Diplomatic missions of Cyprus
- United Nations Peacekeeping Force in Cyprus
  - United Nations Buffer Zone in Cyprus
- Visa requirements for Cypriot citizens

==== International organization membership ====
The Republic of Cyprus is a member of:

- Afro-Asian Peoples' Solidarity Organization (AAPSO)
- Asian-African Legal Consultative Organization (AALCO)
- Asian Organization of Supreme Audit Institutions (ASOSAI)
- Asian Parliamentary Assembly (APA)
- Association of Asian Parliaments for Peace (AAPP)
- Australia Group
- Commonwealth of Nations
- Council of Europe (CE)
- Economic and Monetary Union (EMU)
- European Bank for Reconstruction and Development (EBRD)
- European Investment Bank (EIB)
- European Union (EU)
- Food and Agriculture Organization (FAO)
- International Atomic Energy Agency (IAEA)
- International Bank for Reconstruction and Development (IBRD)
- International Chamber of Commerce (ICC)
- International Civil Aviation Organization (ICAO)
- International Criminal Court (ICCt)
- International Criminal Police Organization (Interpol)
- International Finance Corporation (IFC)
- International Fund for Agricultural Development (IFAD)
- International Hydrographic Organization (IHO)
- International Labour Organization (ILO)
- International Maritime Organization (IMO)
- International Mobile Satellite Organization (IMSO)
- International Monetary Fund (IMF)
- International Olympic Committee (IOC)
- International Organization for Migration (IOM)
- International Organization for Standardization (ISO)
- International Telecommunication Union (ITU)
- International Telecommunications Satellite Organization (ITSO)
- International Trade Union Confederation (ITUC)
- Inter-Parliamentary Union (IPU)
- Middle East Cancer Consortium (MECC)
- Middle East Free Trade Area (US-MEFTA)
- Multilateral Investment Guarantee Agency (MIGA)
- Non-Aligned Movement (NAM) (guest)
- Nuclear Suppliers Group (NSG)
- Organisation internationale de la Francophonie (OIF) (associate member)
- Organization for Security and Cooperation in Europe (OSCE)
- Organisation for the Prohibition of Chemical Weapons (OPCW)
- Organization of American States (OAS) (observer)
- Permanent Court of Arbitration (PCA)
- United Nations (Asian Group) (UN)
- United Nations Conference on Trade and Development (UNCTAD)
- United Nations Educational, Scientific, and Cultural Organization (UNESCO)
- United Nations High Commissioner for Refugees (UNHCR)
- United Nations Industrial Development Organization (UNIDO)
- United Nations Interim Force in Lebanon (UNIFIL)
- Universal Postal Union (UPU)
- World Confederation of Labour (WCL)
- World Customs Organization (WCO)
- World Federation of Trade Unions (WFTU)
- World Health Organization (WHO)
- World Intellectual Property Organization (WIPO)
- World Meteorological Organization (WMO)
- World Tourism Organization (UNWTO)
- World Trade Organization (WTO)

=== Law and order in Cyprus ===
Law of Cyprus

- Capital punishment in Cyprus
- Constitution of Cyprus
- Crime in Cyprus
  - Human trafficking in Cyprus
- Human rights in Cyprus
  - Abortion in Cyprus
  - Freedom of religion in Cyprus
  - Freedom of religion in Northern Cyprus
  - LGBT rights in Cyprus
    - Recognition of same-sex unions in Cyprus
- Law enforcement in Cyprus
  - Cyprus Police
- Taxation in Cyprus

=== Military of Cyprus ===
Cypriot National Guard

- Command
  - Commander-in-chief:
    - Ministry of Defence of Cyprus
- Conscription in Cyprus
- Forces
  - Army of Cyprus
  - Navy of Cyprus
    - Evangelos Florakis Naval Base
  - Air Force of Cyprus
  - Special forces of Cyprus
- Military history of Cyprus
- Military ranks of Cyprus

=== Local government in Cyprus ===
Local government in Cyprus

== History of Cyprus ==
=== History of Cyprus, by period ===
- Timeline of Cypriot history
  - List of years in Cyprus
- Prehistoric Cyprus
  - Khirokitia
- Ancient history of Cyprus
  - Ten city-kingdoms of Cyprus
- Cyprus in the Middle Ages
- Kingdom of Cyprus
- Venetian Cyprus
- Ottoman Cyprus
- History of Cyprus since 1878
  - Cyprus Emergency (1955-1959)
  - Cyprus crisis of 1963–64
  - Turkish invasion of Cyprus (1974)
  - Cyprus Missile Crisis (1997-1998)
  - Evangelos Florakis Naval Base explosion (2011)
  - 2012–13 Cypriot financial crisis

=== History of Cyprus, by region ===
- History of Kyrenia
- History of Nicosia

=== History of Cyprus, by subject ===
- History of Armenians in Cyprus
- Earthquakes in Cyprus
- History of the Jews in Cyprus
- Massacres in Cyprus
- History of medicine in Cyprus
- Military history of Cyprus
  - Armoured vehicles of the Cypriot National Guard
- History of nationality in Cyprus
- History of rail transport in Cyprus

Civilian casualties and displacements during the Cyprus conflict

== Culture of Cyprus ==
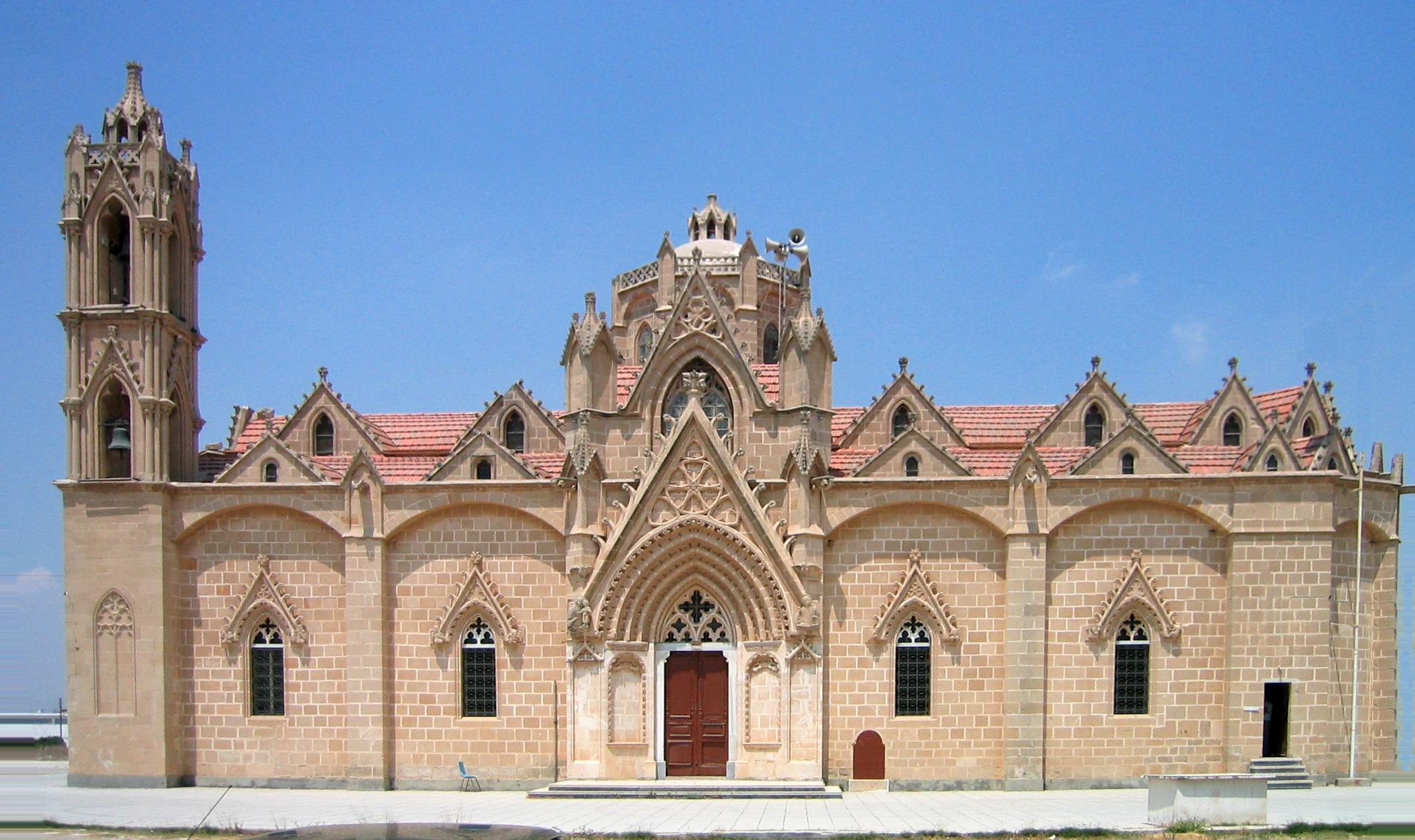
Gothic-style church of Panagia (19th century) at the northern part of the island. Today it functions as a mosque

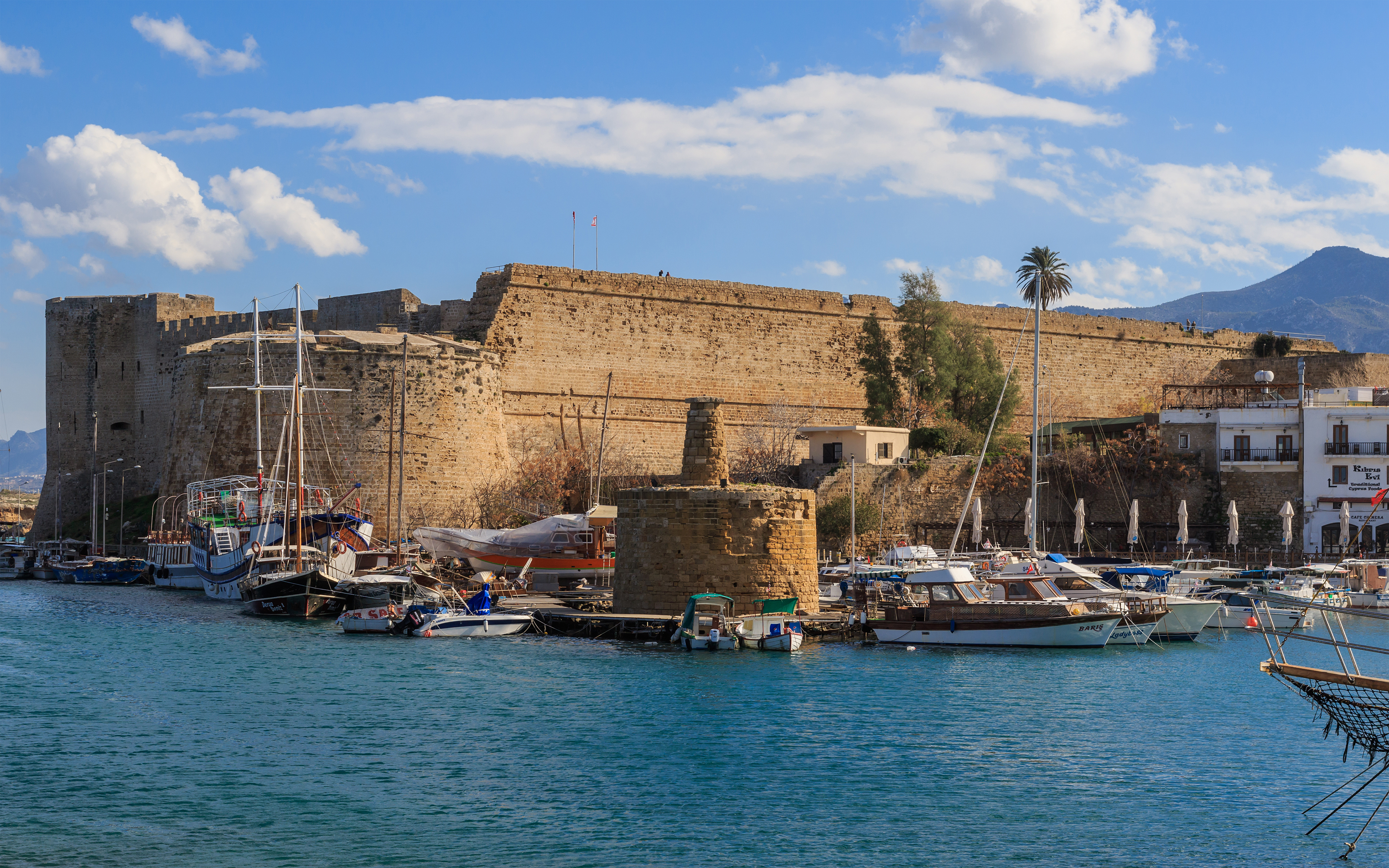
Kyrenia Castle, view from the Old harbour

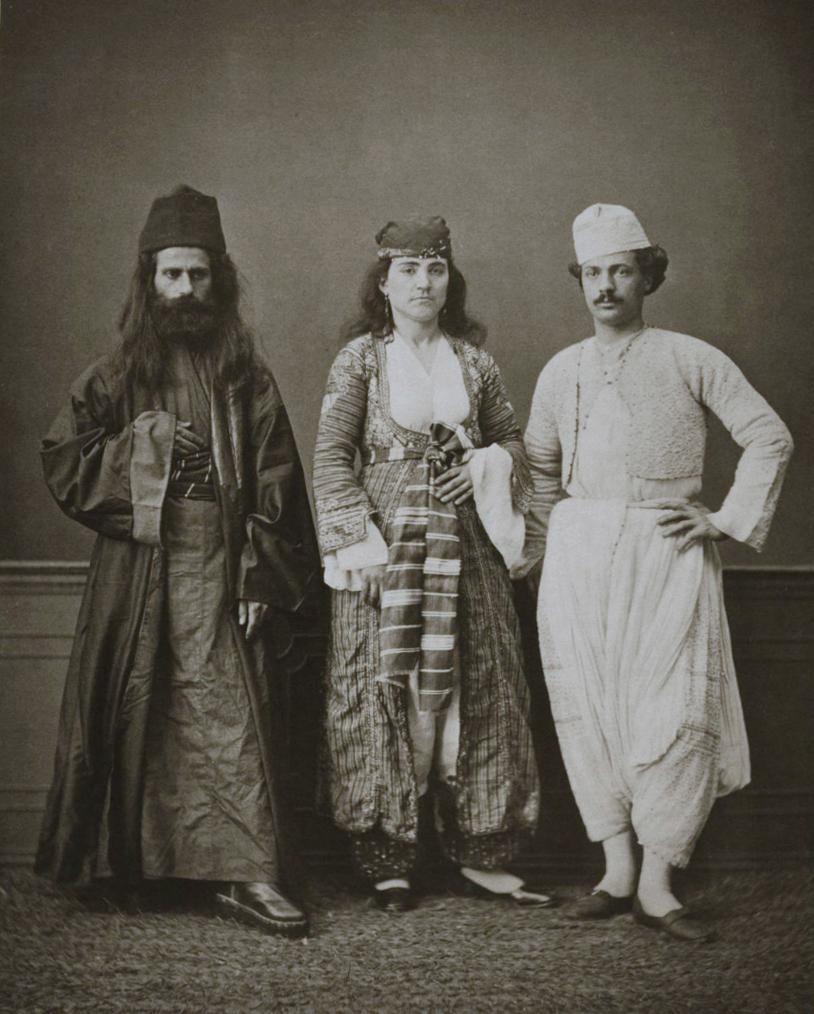
Traditional costumes of Cypriots photographed in 1873

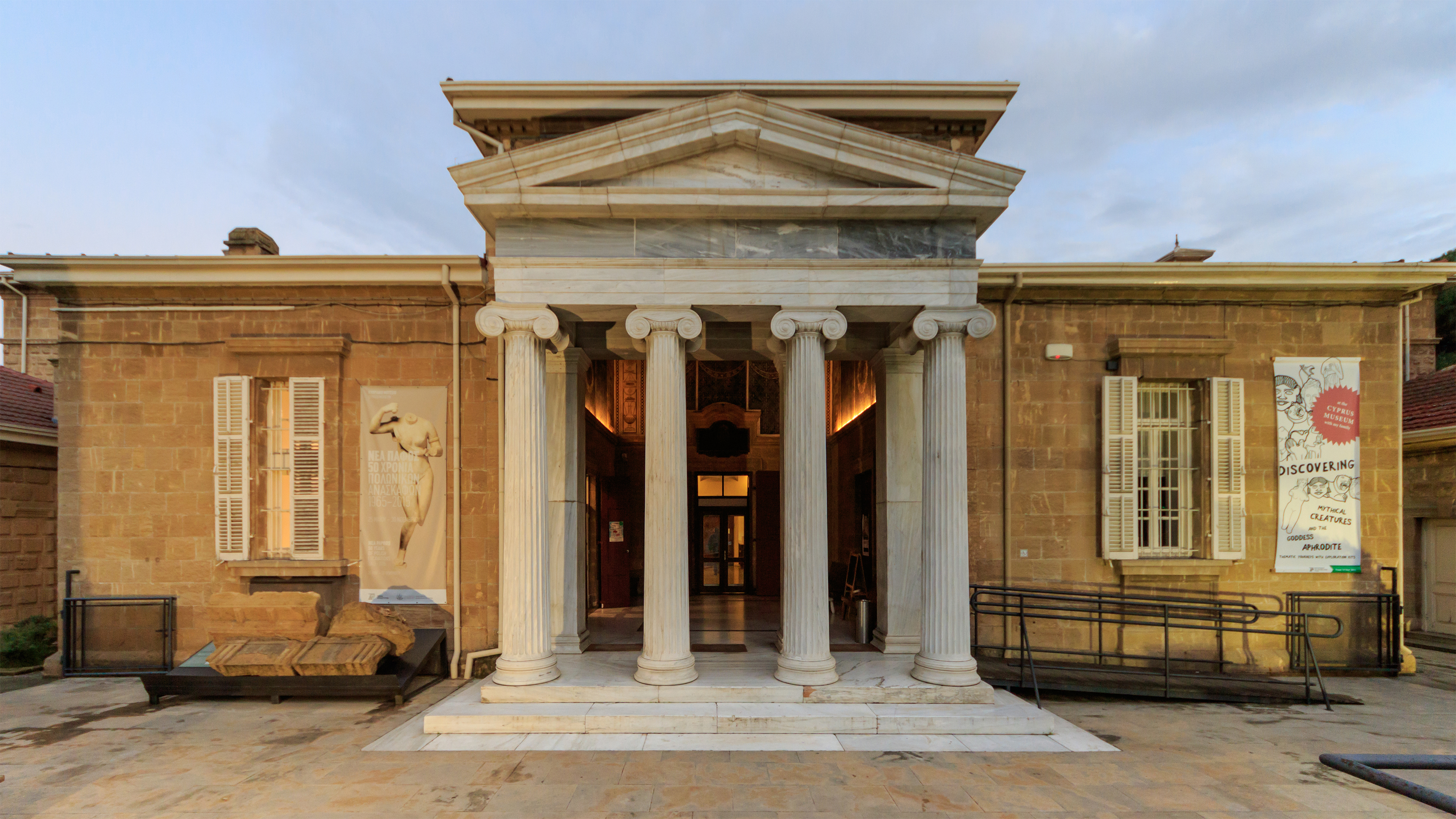
Cyprus Museum in Nicosia

- Architecture of Cyprus
  - Castles in Cyprus
  - Tallest buildings in Cyprus
- Cuisine of Cyprus
  - Cypriot wine
- Festivals in Cyprus
  - International Festival of Ancient Greek Drama, Cyprus
  - Wine Festival
- Languages of Cyprus
  - Cypriot Greek
  - Cypriot Sign Language
  - Cypriot Turkish
- Monuments in Cyprus
  - Armenian monuments in Cyprus
- Museums in Cyprus
- National symbols of Cyprus
  - Coat of arms of Cyprus
  - Flag of Cyprus
  - National anthem of Cyprus
- Non-governmental organisations in Cyprus
- Prostitution in Cyprus
- Public holidays in Cyprus
- Records of Cyprus
- Scouting and guiding in Cyprus
- Welfare state in Cyprus
- World Heritage Sites in Cyprus

=== Art in Cyprus ===
- Art in Cyprus
  - Painters from Cyprus
- Cinema of Cyprus
- Literature of Cyprus
- Music of Cyprus
  - Cyprus in the Eurovision Song Contest
- Theatre in Cyprus
  - Theatrical Organization of Cyprus

=== People of Cyprus ===
People of Cyprus

- Ethnic groups in Cyprus
  - Armenians in Cyprus
  - Greek Cypriots
  - Indians in Cyprus
  - Lebanese people in Cyprus
  - Maronites in Cyprus
  - Russians in Cyprus
  - Turkish Cypriots
- Women in Cyprus

=== Religion in Cyprus ===
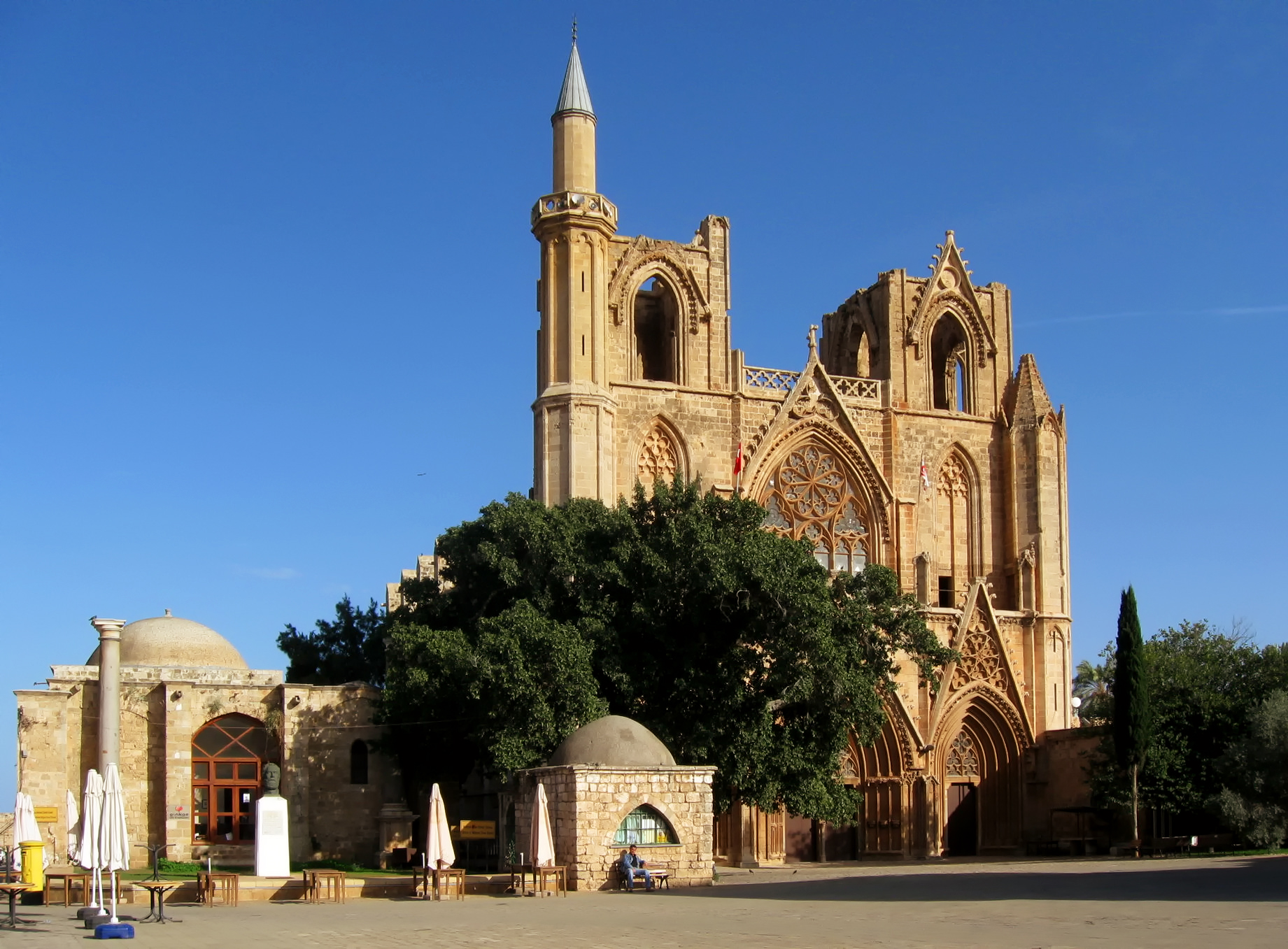
Lala Mustafa Pasha Mosque in Famagusta

Religion in Cyprus

- Christianity in Cyprus
  - Catholic Church in Cyprus
- Hinduism in Cyprus
- Islam in Cyprus
  - Mosques in Cyprus
- Judaism in Cyprus
  - History of the Jews in Cyprus
- Sikhism in Cyprus
- Armenian religion in Cyprus

=== Sports in Cyprus ===
Sports in Cyprus

- Football in Cyprus
  - Football clubs in Cyprus
  - Football stadiums in Cyprus
- Cyprus at the Olympics
- Cyprus Cycling Federation
- Rugby union in Cyprus

== Economy and infrastructure of Cyprus ==
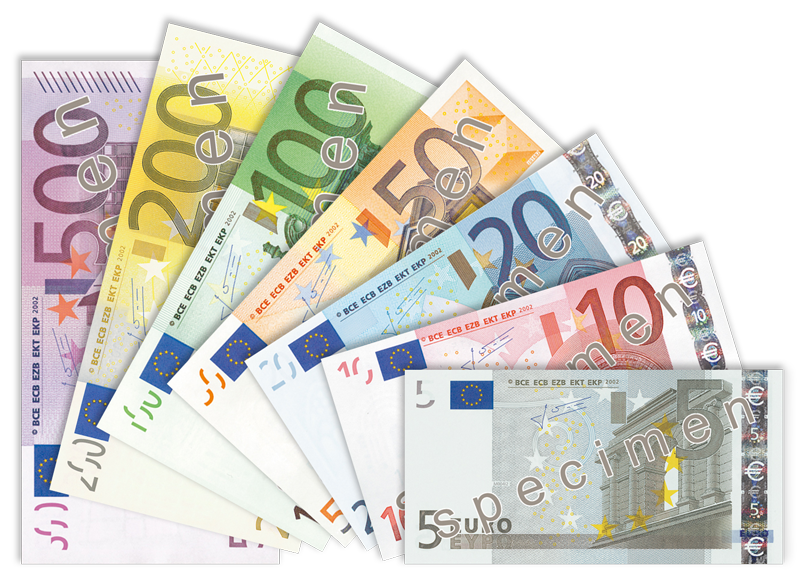
Euro banknotes

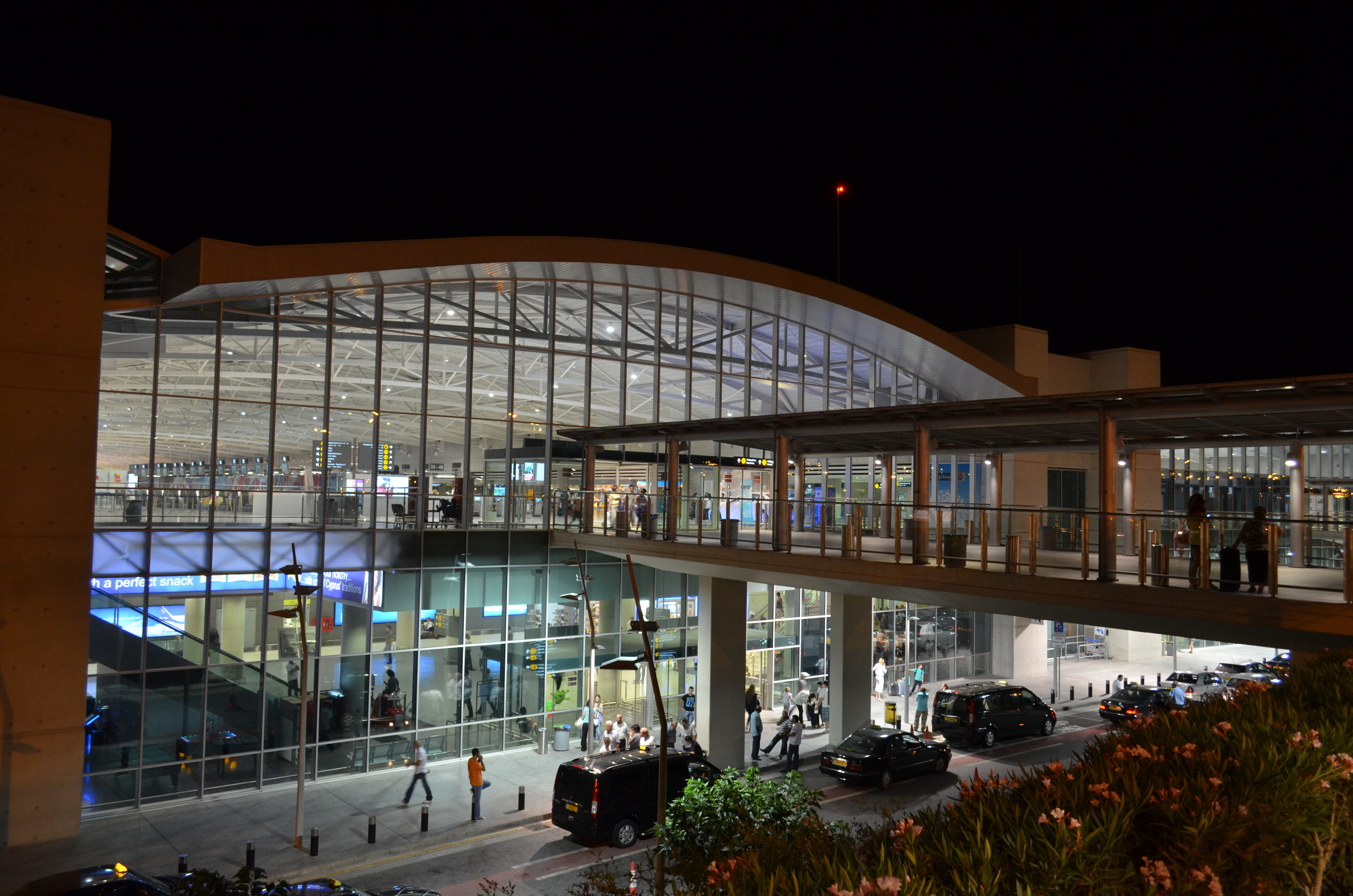
Larnaca International Airport

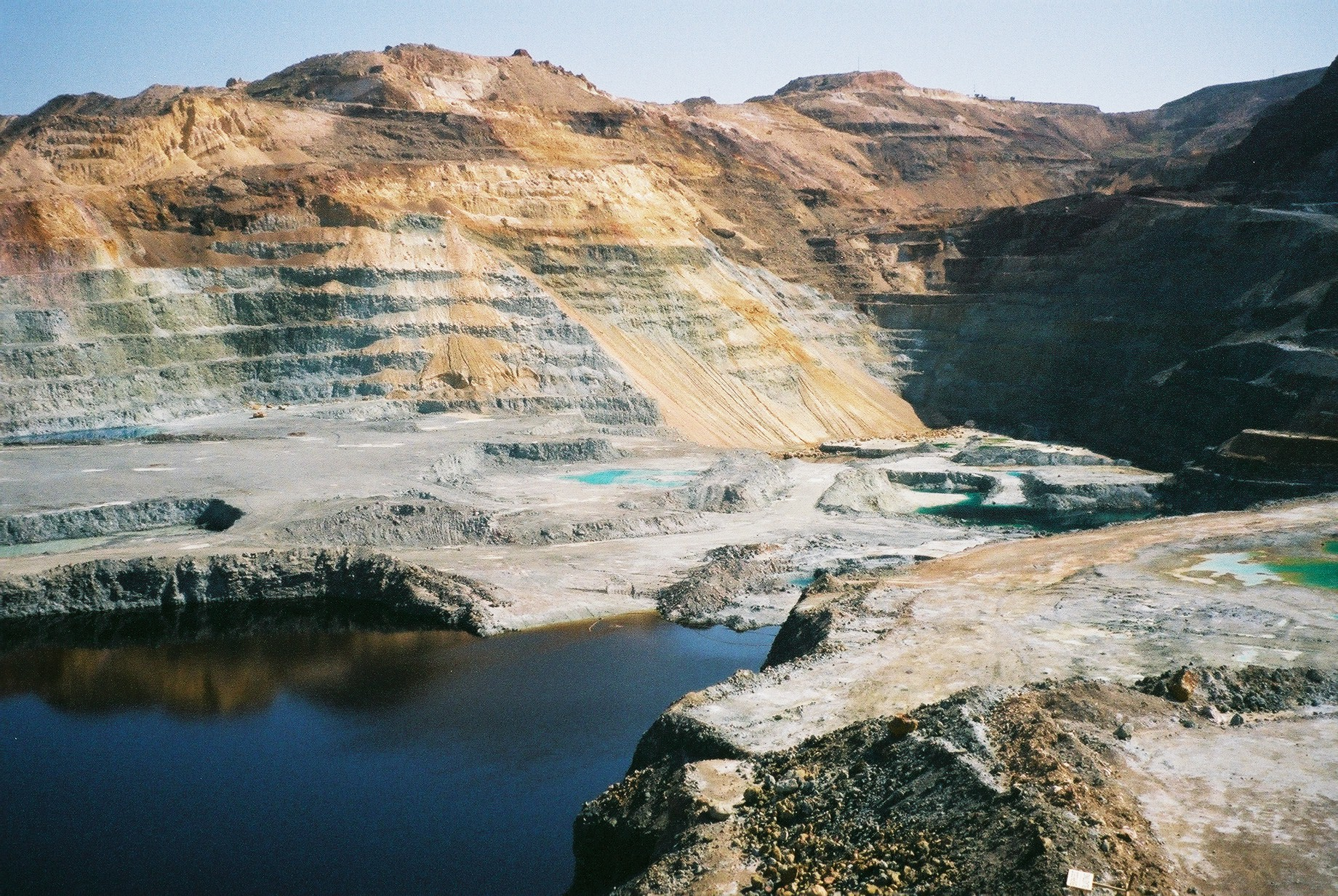
Open pit copper mine Skouriotissa in Cyprus

- Economic rank, by nominal GDP (2007): 89th (eighty-ninth)
- Agriculture in Cyprus
- Banking in Cyprus
  - Central Bank of Cyprus
  - Banks in Cyprus
- Companies of Cyprus
- Currency of Cyprus: Euro (see also: Euro topics)
  - Cypriot euro coins
  - Previous currency: Cypriot pound
  - ISO 4217: EUR
- Mining in Cyprus
- Poverty in Cyprus
- Cyprus Stock Exchange
- Tourism in Cyprus
  - Visa policy of Cyprus

=== Communications in Cyprus ===
Communications in Cyprus

- Internet in Cyprus
- Media in Cyprus
  - Newspapers
  - Radio stations
  - Television in Cyprus
- Cyprus Postal Services
  - Postal codes in Cyprus
- Telephone numbers in Cyprus

=== Energy in Cyprus ===
Energy in Cyprus

- Electricity Authority of Cyprus
  - Dams and reservoirs in Cyprus
- Energy policy of Cyprus
- Oil industry in Cyprus
- Solar power in Cyprus

=== Transport in Cyprus ===
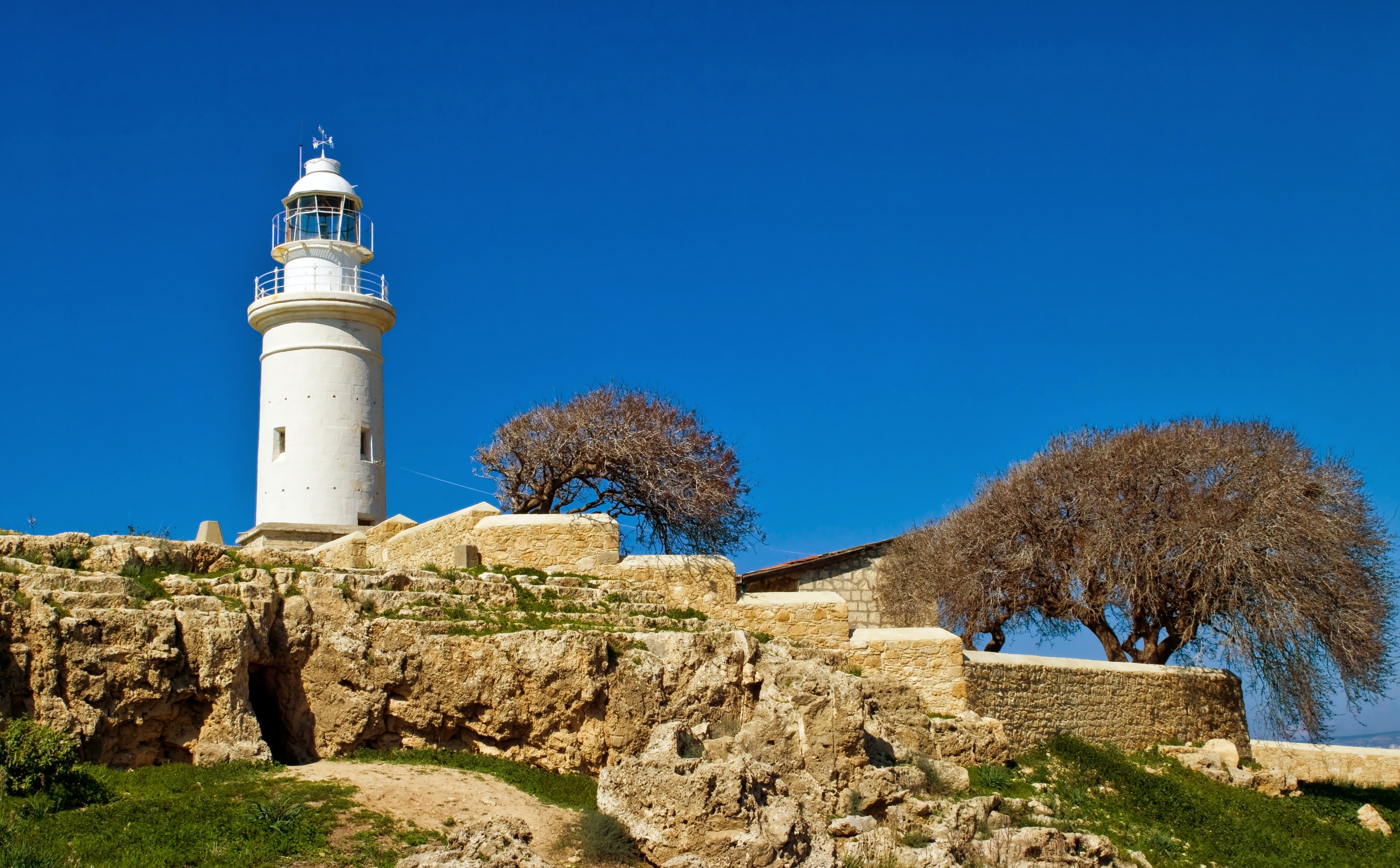
Paphos Lighthouse

Transport in Cyprus

- Airports in Cyprus
- Rail transport in Cyprus
- Roads and motorways in Cyprus
- Ship transport in Cyprus
  - Lighthouses in Cyprus

== Education in Cyprus ==
- Armenian education in Cyprus
- Schools in Cyprus
- Universities and colleges in Cyprus
- Open University of Cyprus
- Secondary education in Cyprus

== Health in Cyprus ==
- Health care in Cyprus
- History of medicine in Cyprus
- Hospitals in Cyprus

== See also ==
Cyprus

- List of international rankings
- Member state of the Commonwealth of Nations
- Member state of the European Union
- Member state of the United Nations
- Outline of Akrotiri and Dhekelia
- Outline of Asia
- Outline of Europe
- Outline of geography
- Outline of Northern Cyprus
