= List of outlines of countries in Asia =

This is a list of articles giving brief summaries of each country in Asia. The transcontinental countries situated in both Asia and Europe are also shown.

1. Outline of Abkhazia
2. Outline of Afghanistan
3. Outline of Armenia
4. Outline of Azerbaijan
5. Outline of Bahrain
6. Outline of Bangladesh
7. Outline of Bhutan
8. Outline of Brunei
9. Outline of Burma
10. Outline of Cambodia
11. Outline of China
12. Outline of Cyprus
13. Outline of East Timor
14. Outline of Georgia
15. Outline of India
16. Outline of Indonesia
17. Outline of Iran
18. Outline of Iraq
19. Outline of Israel
20. Outline of Japan
21. Outline of Jordan
22. Outline of Kazakhstan
23. Outline of Kuwait
24. Outline of Kyrgyzstan
25. Outline of Laos
26. Outline of Lebanon
27. Outline of Malaysia
28. Outline of Maldives
29. Outline of Mongolia
30. Outline of Nepal
31. Outline of Northern Cyprus
32. Outline of North Korea
33. Outline of Oman
34. Outline of Pakistan
35. Outline of Palestine
36. Outline of the Philippines
37. Outline of Qatar
38. Outline of Russia
39. Outline of Saudi Arabia
40. Outline of Singapore
41. Outline of South Korea
42. Outline of South Ossetia
43. Outline of Sri Lanka
44. Outline of Syria
45. Outline of Taiwan
46. Outline of Tajikistan
47. Outline of Thailand
48. Outline of Turkey
49. Outline of Turkmenistan
50. Outline of the United Arab Emirates
51. Outline of Uzbekistan
52. Outline of Vietnam
53. Outline of Yemen
