= List of islands of Northern Cyprus =

This is a list of islands and islets of Northern Cyprus.

== Largest islands by location and (decimal) coordinates ==
English	Turkish	Type	Location	Coordinates
Aspro		islet	Karpasia peninsula	35.591667°N 34.425°E
Dhemoniaris		island	Karpasia peninsula	35.55833°N 34.17083°E
Galounia		islet	Karpasia peninsula	
Glaros		islet	Karpasia peninsula	
Glykiotissa		island	Kyrenia region	35.35°N 33.291667°E
Jila		island	Karpasia peninsula	35.5000°N 34.3333°E
Kalamoulia		islet	near Karavas	
Kemathion		islet	Karpasia peninsula	
Kordhylia		island	Karpasia peninsula	
Kormakitis		islet	cape Kormakitis	
Koutisopetri		islet	Karpasia peninsula	
Koutoulis		islet	Karpasia peninsula	
Lefkonisos		islet	Karpasia peninsula	
Nisha		islet	Karpasia peninsula	
Palloura		islet	Karpasia peninsula	
Petra Tou Limniti	Yeşilırmak Kayacığı	islet	next to Limnitis	
Scales		islet	Karpasia peninsula	
Sernos		islet	Karpasia peninsula	
Skaloudhia		island	Karpasia peninsula	
Skamni		islet	Karpasia peninsula	
Yeronisos		islet	near Karavas	
Klidhes	Zafer adaları	archipelago	the tip of the Karpasia peninsula	
