= Human trafficking in Cyprus =

In 2009, Cyprus was a destination country for women who were subjected to trafficking in persons, specifically forced prostitution, as well as for men and women in forced labor. Women identified as sex trafficking victims in Cyprus originated from Moldova, Ukraine, Bulgaria, the Philippines, Morocco, and Hungary. Sex trafficking occurred within venues used by Cyprus' commercial sex industry, including cabarets, bars, pubs, and massage parlors disguised as private apartments located throughout the country. Groups vulnerable to forced labor included domestic workers, asylum seekers, and migrants working in the farming and agricultural sectors. According to a 2008 EU Thematic Study on Child Trafficking for Cyprus, some children within migrant and Roma communities may be vulnerable to trafficking.

In 2009, the Republic of Cyprus did not fully comply with the minimum standards for the elimination of trafficking; however, it is making some efforts to do so. The government drafted and passed a new National Action Plan and convicted an increased number of traffickers in 2009. However, during 2009, the government identified fewer sex trafficking victims, failed to consistently provide financial and social support services to trafficking victims, and did not effectively address trafficking-related complicity, which local observers reported was hampering the government's anti-trafficking efforts.

Cyprus ratified the 2000 UN TIP Protocol in August 2003.

The U.S. State Department's Office to Monitor and Combat Trafficking in Persons placed the country in "Tier 2" in 2017. The country was moved to Tier 1 by 2023.

Between 2019 and 2022, 24 men, 65 women and nine minors were trafficked in Cyprus. Between 2022-2023, the Social Welfare Services (SWS) responded to 296 cases of trafficking victims. In 2023, the government launched a new unit dedicated to assisting human trafficking victims and victims of sexual exploitation. In the same year, police arrested ten people suspected of running a crime gang ring trafficking migrants.

In 2023, the Organised Crime Index gave Cyprus a score of 5.5 out of 10 for human trafficking, noting that the government had improved its efforts to prevent this crime.

== Prosecution (2009) ==
Cyprus made some progress in its anti-trafficking law enforcement efforts in 2009 by convicting an increased number of traffickers; however, overall sentences for trafficking-related offenses remained inadequate. Cyprus prohibits both sex and labor trafficking through Law 87 (I)/2007, which also contains protection measures for victims. Although the penalties prescribed for sex trafficking range up to 20 years' imprisonment, these penalties are not commensurate with those prescribed for other serious crimes, such as rape, for which the maximum sentence is life in prison. During 2009, police investigated 57 persons in 17 suspected trafficking cases, compared with 70 persons in 29 suspected trafficking cases in 2008. Of the 17 trafficking cases, eight were sent to court, seven are still under investigation, and two were "otherwise disposed of". The government convicted ten sex trafficking offenders in 2009, compared with one in 2008, and courts handed down harsher penalties for some traffickers. Sentences ranged from a $4,400 fine to four years in prison. Local observers reported, however, that the Attorney General's Office downgraded trafficking cases and sometimes tried anti-trafficking cases in lower courts, which are less equipped to deal with serious offenses.

In November 2009, police arrested and charged three suspects for subjecting 110 people to forced labor, mostly in the construction sector; the ringleader reportedly used debt bondage and hired enforcers to control the workers, who were forced to live in converted shipping containers in an isolated industrial area near Nicosia. Cypriot police actively investigated the case with law enforcement; however, a district court released the main suspect after rejecting a fourth request by police for his detention. In 2009, police conducted 95 anti-trafficking raids and 20 undercover operations on establishments suspected of trafficking. Stakeholders reported that police inspected significantly fewer cabarets in 2009. The Department of Labor (DOL) is responsible for inspecting work premises associated with the new "performing artist" work permits; however, no DOL inspectors work after-hours, when "performing artists" are most subject to exploitation in cabarets.

The government in 2009 added an additional member to its four-person police anti-trafficking unit; NGOs, however, report that the police still lack sufficient investigative resources to vigorously combat trafficking throughout the island. In 2008, the police presented a report to the House Human Rights Committee stating, according to local media, that traffickers "have influence on government officials, which makes the arrest and prosecution of traffickers more difficult."

A pending complicity investigation from 2008, involving four police officers who allegedly patronized a cabaret, was yet to be concluded in 2010. In 2007, the government transferred a police officer out of his unit for allegedly raping a trafficking victim; the court determined that the main witnesses in the case were unreliable, and the prosecution against the officer was dropped.

== Prosecution (2018–2020) ==
In 2018, 2019, and 2020, the Cypriot police ran investigations on those suspected of trafficking.

In 2018, 17 of the 22 cases were sent to court, while in 2019 13 of 14 cases were sent to court and in 2020, the cases were reduced to 8 out of 11 cases following through to court.

== Prosecution (2024–2025) ==
(Based on the U.S. Department of State's 2025 Trafficking in Persons Report on Cyprus)

The government demonstrated serious and sustained law enforcement efforts, increasing investigations and prosecutions. In the reporting period, the government prosecuted 16 alleged traffickers (five for sex trafficking, four for labor trafficking, and seven for an unspecified form of trafficking). This resulted in the conviction of seven traffickers (three for sex trafficking and four for labor trafficking, including three for forced criminality).

A notable development was that judges did not issue any suspended sentences, marking a departure from previous years and suggesting stricter judicial penalties. Furthermore, judges granted restitution (financial compensation) for victims for the first time. The government maintained a criminal investigation into allegations of official complicity, including the prosecution of a former government employee for alleged complicity in sex trafficking.

== Protection (2009) ==
The Government of Cyprus made limited but inconsistent progress in ensuring that trafficking victims received necessary protective services over the last year. It continued to fund its own shelter dedicated for trafficking victims, allocating $280,000 for its operation in 2009. The government cared for a total of 47 trafficking victims in the shelter in 2009, compared with 59 victims assisted in 2008. In 2009, the government allocated $235,000 in funding for additional victim assistance, and the Department of Social Welfare Services reported assisting 66 female victims of commercial sexual exploitation and 163 male and female victims of labor exploitation.

Although Cyprus' anti-trafficking law mandates referral of trafficking victims to the government's social welfare services and to the government shelter, it did not employ procedures for front-line responders to proactively identify potential victims during the year, sustaining a long-standing deficiency. NGOs report that the government's failure to recognize their critical role in protection negatively impacted on the government's ability to provide meaningful protection to trafficking victims. In 2009, the government identified a total of 114 new victims of trafficking, the majority of whom were from a forced labor ring involving Romanian nationals; it identified 21 sex trafficking victims in 2009, compared with 41 victims the government identified last year, the majority of whom were sex trafficking victims. The government reported it repatriated 50 of the Romanian labor trafficking victims; the other identified victims reportedly received 45 days of financial support from the government as well as job placement assistance and vocational training.

During the year, the government allowed some victims to stay at the shelter longer than the four weeks prescribed by law. NGOs reported, however, that social services and psychological treatment at the shelter were inadequate, particularly for trafficking victims who do not speak the local languages. Although the government reported that all victims are entitled to long-term housing and welfare benefits, NGOs reported that several victims did not receive their full allowances on a consistent and timely basis. While the government provided some protections to a key prosecution witness from the Dominican Republic and allowed her to stay in the government shelter longer than four weeks, in comments to the media she reported overall inadequate treatment by the government. The government lacks a systematic procedure for the repatriation and safe return of trafficking victims. The government encouraged victims to participate in investigations of trafficking offenders and reported that all identified trafficking victims cooperated with law enforcement in 2009. However, cabaret owners and agents reportedly used attorneys to bribe potential witnesses, and pressured women to withdraw complaints or not follow through with testifying in court. In January 2010, the European Court of Human Rights found that Cyprus failed to adequately protect a trafficking victim from Russia who died in 2001 under suspicious circumstances.

== Protection (2024–2025) ==
The Government of Cyprus continued to fund and implement protective services, though the number of formally identified victims decreased to 11 (compared to 31 in 2023). Of these, three were exploited in sex trafficking, seven in labor trafficking, and one in an unspecified form of trafficking.

The Social Welfare Services (SWS) maintained the "Unit for Managing Human Trafficking" to coordinate the identification and referral process, serving as the central point of contact for government services. The government continued to provide shelter, psychological, and medical assistance. It maintained a memorandum of cooperation with two NGOs to manage transitional housing for female sex trafficking victims, offering longer-term accommodation for those seeking permanent residence after leaving the government shelter.

== Prevention (2009) ==
The government did not implement any comprehensive campaigns to specifically address demand within the context of Cyprus, or to educate clients about the realities of forced prostitution inherent to the island's sex industry, a long-standing deficiency. The government approved a 2010–2012 National Action Plan to combat human trafficking that calls for demand-focused public awareness campaigns and cooperation with NGOs to conduct outreach at universities, army camps, and other venues. In the same year, the government also provided over $8,000 to a radio station for programming throughout the year that specifically addressed human trafficking in Cyprus.

Although the government reported it adopted a new policy to screen applications for foreign "performing artists", the work permit category that replaced the previous "artiste visa", some NGOs indicated that the revised policy had little actual impact on reducing trafficking in Cyprus' commercial sex industry. However, the government reported a nearly 40 percent decrease in the number of cabarets operating during 2009, with the government reporting that it had issued 1,225 "performing artist" work permits and 20 "creative artist" permits; these numbers include renewals and changes of employer. The government reported that, as of February 2010, there were 331 performing artists in Cyprus. One NGO reported a sharp increase in the issuance of "barmaid" work permits in 2009; the government reported it issued 467 such permits in 2009, up from 422 issued during the previous reporting period. Another NGO questioned the government's official statistics on trafficking, speculating that a number of trafficking victims were intentionally left out of the statistics to indicate a smaller problem.

== Prevention (2024–2025) ==
The government sustained its commitment to prevention, including the continued implementation of its National Action Plan. Police conducted public awareness campaigns focused on combating sex trafficking and engaged in outreach to children and youth in schools. Information regarding trafficking was actively disseminated across government websites and social media platforms.

The Department of Labor increased its inspections of high-risk businesses, including those in the agricultural and construction sectors, to proactively identify forced labor indicators. The government also maintained strong cooperation with international partners and civil society to execute its prevention strategies.

== See also ==
- Human rights in Cyprus
