= Extreme points of Northern Cyprus =

A map depicting the extreme points of Northern Cyprus

The extreme points of Northern Cyprus are the most notable places that are closest to the most northerly, southerly, easterly, and westerly areas of North Cyprus, the northern third of the Mediterranean island of Cyprus. The most easterly and northerly places are the same, due to the north-easterly protrusion of the Karpass Peninsula.

Direction	Location	District	Coordinates
North	Klidhes Islands	İskele	35°43′N 34°36′E
North (mainland)	Cape Apostolos Andreas	İskele	35°41.70′N 34°35.20′E
South	Akıncılar	Lefkosia (Nicosia)	35°00′50.00″N 33°27′48.43″E
East	Klidhes Islands	İskele	35°43′N 34°36′E
East (mainland)	Cape Apostolos Andreas	İskele	35°41.70′N 34°35.20′E
West	Erenköy, in the Kokkina exclave	Kokkina exclave	35°10′36.48″N 32°38′12.84″E

Altitude
Description	Location	Height above sea level	Area Description	Coordinates
Highest Point	Mount Selvili	1,023 m (3,357 ft)	Part of the Kyrenia Range, which is a limestone ridge along the mid-northern coast of Cyprus.	35°19′13″N 33°09′31″E
Lowest Point	Mediterranean Sea	0 m (0 ft)	-	35°N 18°E
