= Outline of Northern Cyprus =

Overview of and topical guide to Northern Cyprus

The Flag of Northern Cyprus

The Coat of arms of Northern Cyprus

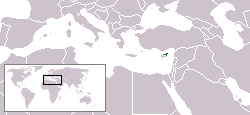
The location of Northern Cyprus

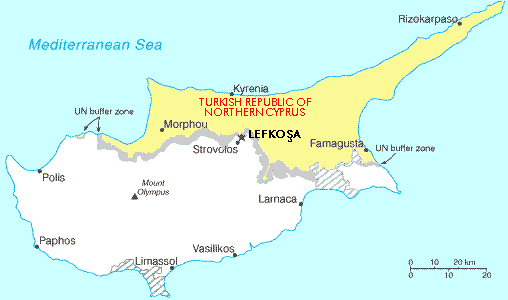
An enlargeable map of Northern Cyprus

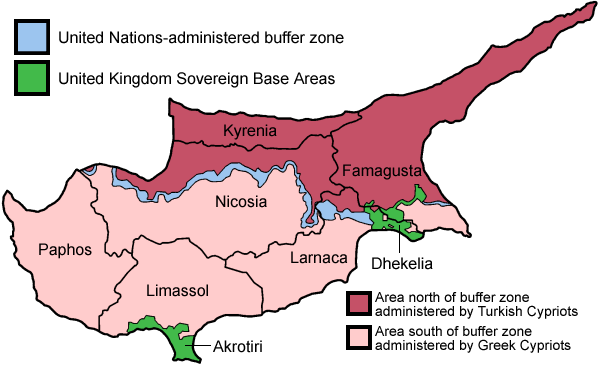
An enlargeable political map of the island of Cyprus

The following outline is provided as an overview of and topical guide to Northern Cyprus:

Northern Cyprus – de facto independent republic on the Mediterranean island of Cyprus. Officially it is the northern territory of the Republic of Cyprus. The territory includes the Kokkina exclave, a pene-enclave "of" the rest of Cyprus, partly surrounded by sea.

The TRNC declared independence in 1983, nine years after a Greek Cypriot coup attempting to annex the island to Greece triggered an invasion by Turkey. It has received diplomatic recognition only from Turkey, on which it is dependent for economic, political and military support. The rest of the international community, including the United Nations and European Union, recognises the sovereignty of the Republic of Cyprus over the whole island.

== General reference ==
- Pronunciation: kʰuzej kʰɯbɾɯs dʒumhuɾijetʰi
- Common English country name: Northern Cyprus
- Official English country name: (the) Turkish Republic of Northern Cyprus
- Common endonym(s): Kuzey Kıbrıs
- Official endonym(s): Kuzey Kıbrıs Türk Cumhuriyeti
- Adjectival(s): Northern Cypriot, Turkish Cypriot
- Demonym(s): Northern Cypriot, Turkish Cypriot, Cypriot Turk
- Etymology: Name of Northern Cyprus
- ISO country codes: See the Outline of Cyprus
- ISO region codes: See the Outline of Cyprus
- Internet country code top-level domain: See the Outline of Cyprus

== Geography of Northern Cyprus ==
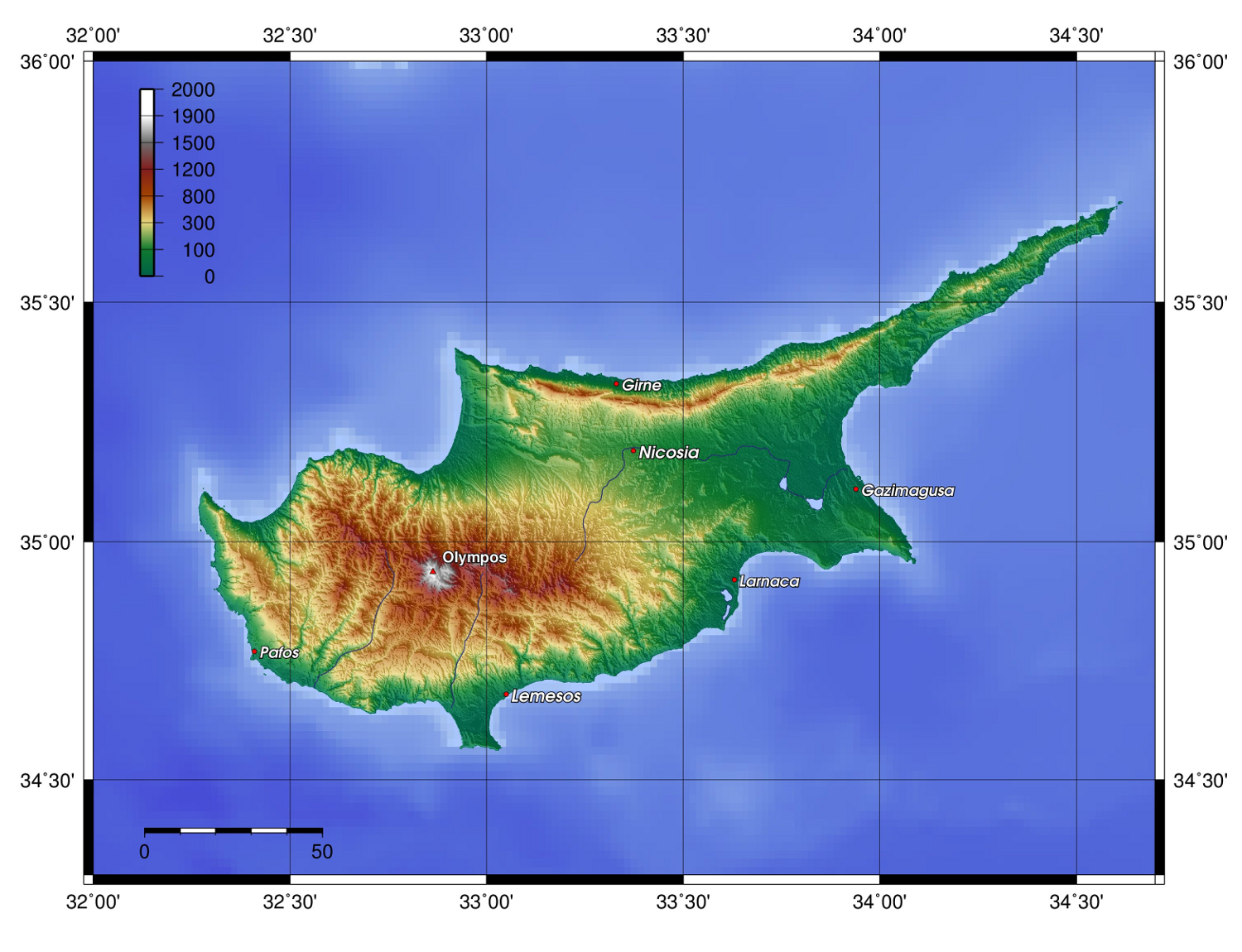
An enlargeable topographic map of the island of Cyprus

Geography of Northern Cyprus

  - Extreme points of Northern Cyprus
- Population of Northern Cyprus: 294,906 (as of 2011, disputed)
  - Population density: 86/km^{2} (223/mi^{2}) (116th)
- Area of Northern Cyprus: 3,355 km^{2} (1,295 mi^{2}) (174th if ranked) (2.7% water)
  - Atlas of Northern Cyprus

=== Location ===
- Northern Cyprus is located in the following regions:
  - Northern Hemisphere and Eastern Hemisphere
  - Atlantic Ocean
    - Mediterranean Sea
      - Cyprus Island (which it shares with the Republic of Cyprus)
  - Eurasia (though not on the mainland)
    - Asia
      - Western Asia
      - Cyprus Island (which it shares with the Republic of Cyprus)
  - Mediterranean Basin
  - Time zone: Eastern European Time (UTC+02), Eastern European Summer Time (UTC+03)

=== Environment of Northern Cyprus ===
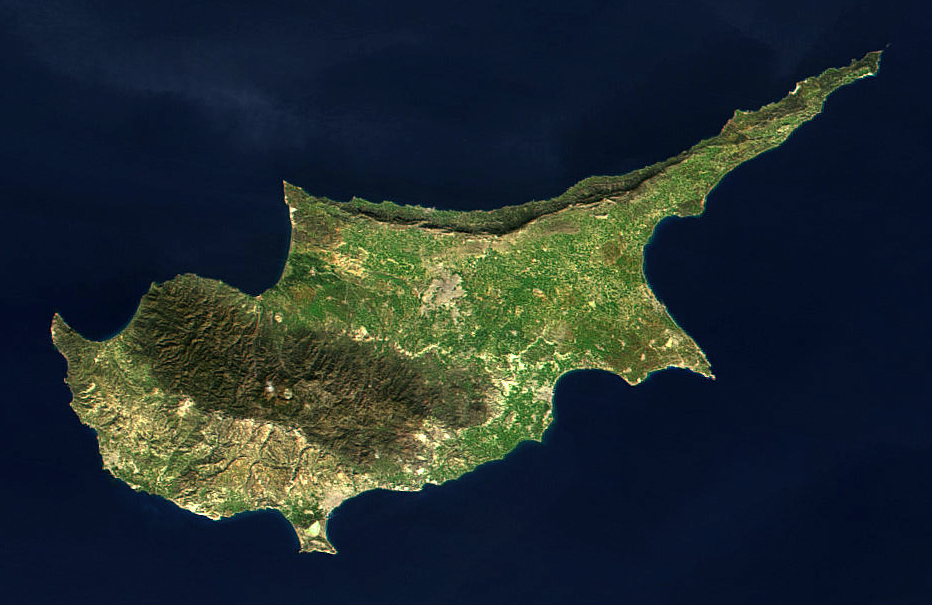
An enlargeable satellite image of the island of Cyprus

- Climate of Northern Cyprus

==== Natural geographic features of Northern Cyprus ====
- World Heritage Sites in Northern Cyprus: None

==== Ecoregions of Northern Cyprus ====
- Karpaz Peninsula, the area around Cape Apostolos Andreas has been declared as a national park.

==== Administrative divisions of Northern Cyprus ====
- Districts of Northern Cyprus
  - Gazimağusa District
  - Girne District
  - Güzelyurt District
  - İskele District
  - Lefke District
  - Lefkoşa District

===== Municipalities of Northern Cyprus =====
- Capital of Northern Cyprus: Nicosia
- Cities of Northern Cyprus: Famagusta, Kyrenia, Morphou, Trikomo

=== Demography of Northern Cyprus ===
Demographics of Northern Cyprus

== Government and politics of Northern Cyprus ==
Politics of Northern Cyprus

- Form of government:
- Capital of Northern Cyprus: Nicosia
- Elections in Northern Cyprus
- Political parties in Northern Cyprus

=== Branches of the government of Northern Cyprus ===
Government of Northern Cyprus

==== Executive branch of the government of Northern Cyprus ====
- Head of state: President of Northern Cyprus, Tufan Erhürman
- Head of government: Prime Minister of Northern Cyprus, Ünal Üstel

==== Legislative branch of the government of Northern Cyprus ====
- Parliament of Northern Cyprus (unicameral)
  - Assembly of the Republic

=== Foreign relations of Northern Cyprus ===
Foreign relations of Northern Cyprus

- List of diplomatic missions in Northern Cyprus
- List of diplomatic missions of Northern Cyprus

==== International organization membership ====
The Turkish Republic of Northern Cyprus is a member of:

- Organisation of Islamic Cooperation (OIC) - Observer
- Economic Cooperation Organization - Observer
- Organization of Turkic States - Observer
- Parliamentary Assembly of the Council of Europe (PACE) - two representatives as "Turkish Cypriot Community"

=== Law and order in Northern Cyprus ===
- Constitution of Northern Cyprus
- Human rights in Northern Cyprus
  - LGBT rights in Northern Cyprus
  - Freedom of religion in Northern Cyprus
- Law enforcement in Northern Cyprus

=== Military of Northern Cyprus ===
Military of Northern Cyprus

- Turkish Armed Forces in the Turkish Republic of Northern Cyprus
- Forces
  - Army of Northern Cyprus
  - Navy of Northern Cyprus
  - Air Force of Northern Cyprus
  - Special forces of Northern Cyprus
- Military history of Northern Cyprus

== History of Northern Cyprus ==
History of Northern Cyprus

- Military history of Northern Cyprus

== Culture of Northern Cyprus ==
- Cuisine of Northern Cyprus
- National symbols of Northern Cyprus
  - Coat of arms of Northern Cyprus
  - Flag of Northern Cyprus
- Public holidays in Northern Cyprus
- Turkish Cypriot diaspora
- World Heritage Sites in Northern Cyprus: None

=== Art in Northern Cyprus ===
- Television in Northern Cyprus

=== Sports in Northern Cyprus ===
- Football in Northern Cyprus

== Economy and infrastructure of Northern Cyprus ==
Economy of Northern Cyprus

- Economic rank, by nominal GDP (2007): 89th (eighty-ninth)
- Currency of Northern Cyprus: Lira
  - ISO 4217: TRY
- Transportation in Northern Cyprus
  - Rail transport in Northern Cyprus

== Education in Northern Cyprus ==
Education in Northern Cyprus

== Airport of Northern Cyprus ==
Ercan Airport

== See also ==
- Outline of Cyprus
