= Taxation in Cyprus =

Taxes in Cyprus are levied by both the central and local governments. Tax revenue stood at 39.2% of GDP in 2012. The most important revenue sources are the income tax, social security, value-added tax and corporate tax, and are all collected by the central government.

Income tax is levied on a progressive rate. Current brackets vary from 0% to 35% in the tax rates for 2014. Furthermore, various tax allowances apply for trade union fees, donation to charities. The tax brackets for the year 2014 are:

Annual income	Tax rate
In between €0 and €19500	0%
In between €19500 and €28000	20%
In between €28000 and €36300	25%
In between €36300 and €60000	30%
In excess of €60000	35%

Employment income is also subject to various social security contributions. Contributions are subject to a ceiling, for the year 2014 the maximum amount of insurable earnings has been set to €54396 per year. Employees pay 7.8% of their wage and employers contribute 11.5% of the corresponding wage.

Value added tax applies to most sales of goods and services. The standard rate applies at 19% in 2014, up from 17% since 2013. A lower rate of 9% applies to groceries, books and hotel services. The Cyprus VAT is part of the European Union value added tax system. Certain goods and services are exempt from VAT. This includes exports, financial services, rent, etc.

Corporate taxes are levied at a rate of 15%, following the 2025 Cyprus Tax Reform which aligned Cyprus with the OECD global minimum tax initiative.

== 2025 Cyprus Tax Reform ==
The 2025 Cyprus Tax Reform represents a major overhaul of the country’s tax system, introducing significant changes to corporate and personal taxation, dividend rules, and economic substance requirements. The corporate tax rate will increase from 12.5% to 15%, aligning Cyprus with the OECD’s global minimum tax initiative. The reform abolishes the Deemed Dividend Distribution (DDD) rules, reduces the Special Defence Contribution (SDC) tax on dividends for Cyprus-domiciled individuals from 17% to 5%, and strengthens economic substance requirements to prevent tax avoidance. Additionally, new incentives for green and digital investments have been introduced, along with adjustments to personal income tax brackets. These changes aim to modernize Cyprus’ tax regime, ensuring compliance with international standards while maintaining its appeal as a business-friendly jurisdiction.
