= International rankings of Cyprus =

These are the international rankings of Cyprus

== International rankings ==
Organization	Survey	Ranking
State of World Liberty Project	State of World Liberty Index	9 out of 159
United Nations Development Programme	Human Development Index 2006; Human Development Index 2004; Human Development Index 2000	29 out of 177; 29 out of 177; 29 out of 177
The Economist	Worldwide Quality-of-life Index, 2005	23 out of 111
University of Leicester	Satisfaction with Life Index	49 out of 178
The Heritage Foundation/Wall Street Journal	Index of Economic Freedom	20 out of 157
Reporters Without Borders	Worldwide Press Freedom Index 2006; Worldwide Press Freedom Index 2005	30 out of 168; 25(tied) out of 168
Transparency International	Corruption Perceptions Index 2006; Corruption Perceptions Index 2005; Corruption Perceptions Index 2004	37 out of 163; 37 out of 158; 36 out of 145
World Economic Forum	Global Competitiveness Report	46 out of 125
International Monetary Fund	GDP per capita	31 out of 180
Yale University/Columbia University	Environmental Sustainability Index 2005	not ranked
Nationmaster	Labor strikes	not ranked
A.T. Kearney / Foreign Policy	Globalisation Index 2006; Globalisation Index 2005; Globalisation Index 2004	not ranked
World Intellectual Property Organization	Global Innovation Index, 2026	29 out of 139
