= Paphos Lighthouse =

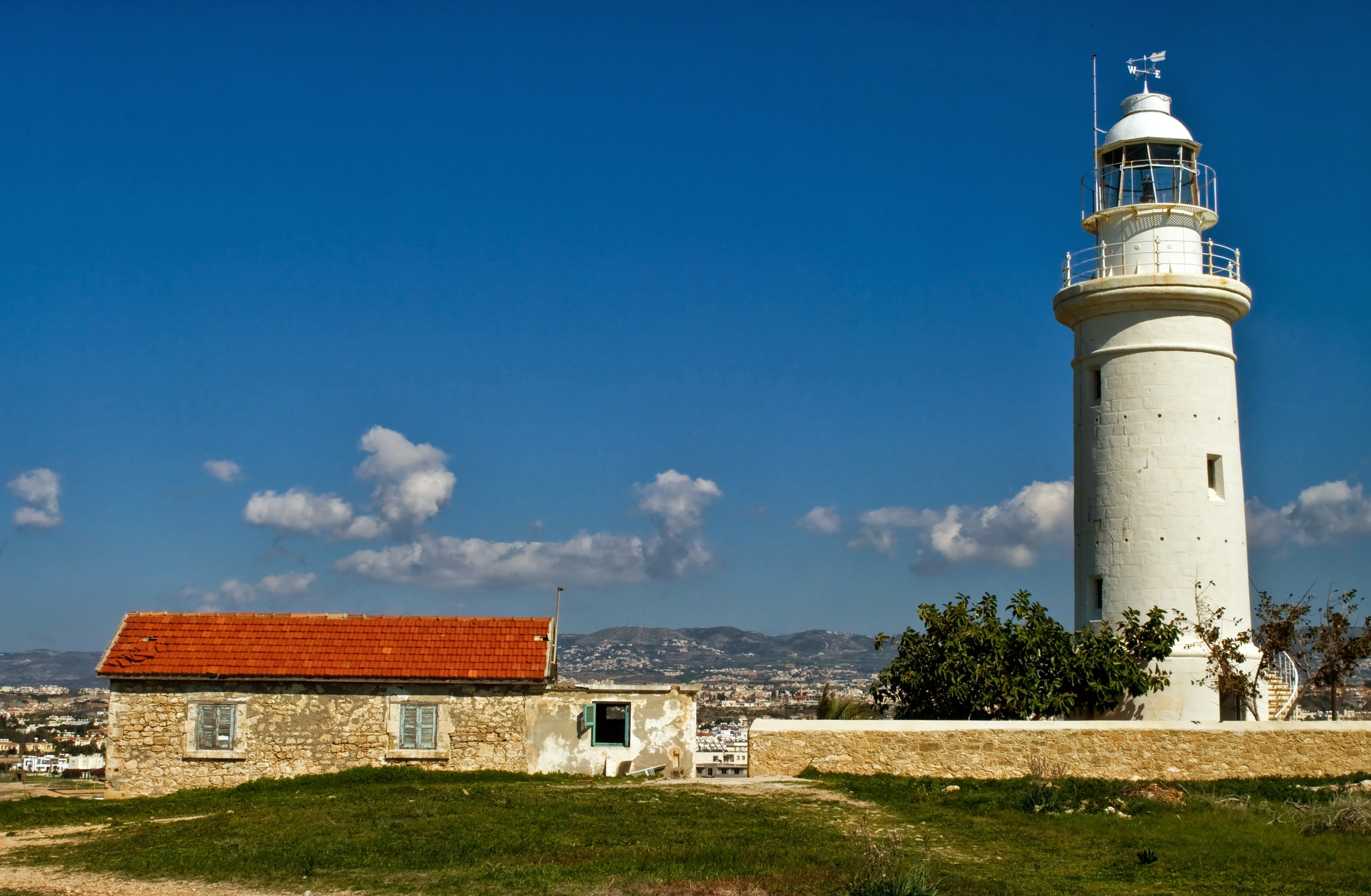
- Location: Paphos, Cyprus
- Coordinates: 34.7606°N 32.4063°E

Tower
- Constructed: 1888
- Construction: stone tower
- Height: 20 metres (66 ft)
- Shape: cylindrical tower with balcony and lantern
- Markings: white tower

Light
- Focal height: 36 metres (118 ft)
- Range: 17 nautical miles (31 km; 20 mi)
- Characteristic: Fl W 15s.

Paphos Lighthouse is a well known lighthouse on the island of Cyprus, near to the city of Paphos. It is sited on a peninsula known as Paphos point which extends into the Mediterranean Sea, at the south western end of the island.

Built in 1888, when Cyprus was under British administration, the island was a key military base protecting the route of ships travelling through the Suez Canal to the colonies. The light acted as a landfall marker for shipping destined for Paphos harbour from Britain.

The 20m high whitewashed masonry tower has a single gallery and lantern. Enclosing the tower is a compound containing the keeper's house and outbuildings.

With a focal height of 36m above the sea, its light can be seen for 17 nautical miles, and consists of a long flash of white light every fifteen seconds.

== See also ==
- List of lighthouses in Cyprus
