= National symbols of Cyprus =

The national symbols of Cyprus are official and unofficial flags, icons or cultural expressions that are emblematic, representative or otherwise characteristic of Cyprus and of its culture.

== Heraldry ==
Red Lion in British Cyprus

Up and Down red Lion.

Badge of Cyprus, (1905–1960).

Badge of Cyprus, (1881–1905).

== Symbol ==
| Title | Name of Symbol | Picture |
|---|---|---|
| National flag | Flag of Cyprus | |
| Coat of arms | Coat of arms of Cyprus | |
| National anthem | Hymn to Liberty | Hymn to liberty |
| National flower | Cyprus cyclamen | |
| Father of the Nation | Ethnarch Archbishop Makarios III | |
| National tree | Golden oak (Quercus alnifolia) | Quercus alnifolia (Golden oak) |
| National bird | Cyprus warbler | |
| National animal | Cypriot Mouflon | |
