= Human trafficking in Morocco =

Human trafficking in Morocco involves the exploitation of men, women, and children for forced labor and sexual exploitation. Morocco functions as a source, transit, and destination country, particularly for migrants from sub-Saharan Africa and South Asia.

Since the early 2010s, Morocco has taken legislative and institutional steps to address trafficking, including ratifying the United Nations Protocol to Prevent, Suppress and Punish Trafficking in Persons in 2011 and adopting Law No. 27–14 on combating trafficking in persons in 2016. Despite these reforms, international monitoring bodies continue to identify challenges related to victim identification, implementation of protections for migrants, and effective prosecution of trafficking networks.

The U.S. Department of State classified Morocco as a Tier 2 country in its Trafficking in Persons Reports in both 2017 and 2023, indicating that while the government does not fully meet the minimum standards for the elimination of trafficking, it is making significant efforts to do so. In 2023, the Organized Crime Index assigned Morocco a score of 5.5 out of 10 for human trafficking, reflecting persistent structural and regional vulnerabilities.

== Legal framework and policy ==
Morocco ratified the United Nations Trafficking in Persons Protocol in April 2011. In 2016, the government enacted Law No. 27-14, which provides a comprehensive legal definition of human trafficking aligned with international standards and establishes penalties ranging from five to ten years’ imprisonment, with harsher sentences for offenses involving children or organized criminal groups.

The law also introduced provisions for victim protection, including access to medical care, legal assistance, and temporary residency permits for foreign victims of trafficking. International observers have welcomed the adoption of the law while noting that its implementation remains uneven.

== Current trends (2016–present) ==
Reports published since 2016 indicate that trafficking in Morocco increasingly affects migrants and refugees, particularly women from sub-Saharan Africa who are vulnerable to sexual exploitation and domestic servitude. Forced labor has been reported in sectors such as domestic work, construction, agriculture, and informal services.

While Moroccan authorities have increased investigations and prosecutions under Law No. 27-14, international monitoring bodies continue to report inconsistencies in victim identification and the ongoing conflation of migrant smuggling with human trafficking, particularly in cases involving undocumented migrants.

== Early assessments (2009) ==
In 2009, international assessments identified Morocco as a source, destination, and transit country for men, women, and children subjected to trafficking in persons, including forced labor and sexual exploitation. Children were trafficked internally from rural areas to urban centers to work as domestic servants or laborers, or for commercial sexual exploitation. Moroccan men, women, and children were also exploited for forced labor and prostitution in Middle Eastern countries.

Young Moroccan girls from rural areas were recruited to work as child domestic workers in cities, where many experienced non-payment of wages, threats, physical or sexual abuse, and restrictions on movement, indicating conditions of involuntary servitude. Moroccan boys experienced forced labor as apprentices in artisan workshops, construction, and mechanic shops. Some Moroccan men and boys were reportedly lured to Europe through fraudulent job offers and subsequently forced to sell drugs.

Men and women from sub-Saharan Africa, South Asia, and the Philippines entered Morocco voluntarily but irregularly with the assistance of smugglers; once in the country, some women were coerced into prostitution or, less frequently, forced into domestic service. Nigerian criminal networks were reported to compete for control over the trafficking of sub-Saharan Africans in Morocco.

In 2009, the Government of Morocco did not fully comply with the minimum standards for the elimination of trafficking, though it was reported to be making significant efforts. Authorities convicted one individual for subjecting a 13-year-old child domestic worker to forced labor but continued to face challenges in prosecuting trafficking offenses, identifying victims among vulnerable populations, and ensuring that foreign victims were not subject to arrest or deportation. Government authorities were also reported to conflate migrant smuggling with human trafficking.

== Prosecution (2009-2010) ==
During this period, Moroccan law prohibited several forms of exploitation associated with trafficking. The Penal Code prohibited forced child labor under Article 467, forced labor under Article 10, and forced prostitution and the prostitution of minors under Articles 497–499. Authorities also reported using the Immigration Law of 2003 and statutes addressing kidnapping, fraud, and coercion to prosecute trafficking-related offenses.

Penalties for sex trafficking offenses were considered sufficiently stringent, while penalties for labor trafficking offenses were viewed as comparatively weak. In October 2009, a court convicted the wife of a judge for subjecting a child domestic worker to forced labor, sentencing her to three and a half years’ imprisonment. The Ministry of Justice reported prosecutions related to child begging and child prostitution, though it was unclear how many cases met the legal definition of human trafficking.

== Protection (2009-2010) ==
During this period, protection measures for trafficking victims were limited. Foreign victims were frequently treated as undocumented migrants and subject to detention or deportation. Large numbers of undocumented migrants were detained and expelled without systematic efforts to identify potential trafficking victims. Some migrants reported experiencing abuse by criminal gangs after deportation.

Government-operated Child Protection Units in Casablanca and Marrakesh offered assistance to street children and victims of violence and exploitation, potentially including trafficking victims. A government-run hotline referred women and children experiencing violence to civil society organizations, though it was unclear whether trafficking victims were identified through this mechanism. Moroccan diplomatic missions reportedly provided assistance to Moroccan nationals trafficked abroad.

== Prevention (2009-2010) ==
Preventive efforts during this period included the integration of anti-trafficking modules into training programs for law enforcement and the judiciary. Labor inspectors received training related to child labor, and the government issued birth certificates and national identity cards to citizens, including children in rural areas.

Authorities cooperated with international organizations, including the International Organization for Migration, in preparing assessments of Morocco's anti-trafficking efforts and recommendations for legislative reform. At the time, Morocco had not yet ratified the United Nations Trafficking in Persons Protocol.
