= List of lighthouses in Cyprus =

This is a list of lighthouses in Cyprus, a large island which lies at the eastern end of the Mediterranean. The list includes those located in the Republic of Cyprus, the occupied areas of Northern Cyprus and British Sovereign Base Areas. The numbers given are those from the Admiralty list of lights.

== Lighthouses ==
=== Republic of Cyprus ===
Name	Image	Year built	Location & coordinates	Class of light	Focal height	NGA number	Admiralty number	Range nml
Cape Akamas Lighthouse	Image	1989	Akamas Peninsula; 35°05′28.1″N 32°16′55.9″E	Fl (2) 15s.	211 metres (692 ft)	20986	E5907.6	17
Cape Greco Lighthouse		1892	Cape Greco; 34°57′25.9″N 34°05′06.3″E	Fl W 15s.	16 metres (52 ft)	20940	E5888	12
Cape Kiti Lighthouse		1864 est.	Pervolia; 34°49′01.4″N 33°36′11.0″E	Fl (3) W 15s.	20 metres (66 ft)	20904	E5882	13
Limassol New Port North Breakwater Lighthouse		n/a	Limassol; 34°39′03.9″N 33°01′27.6″E	Oc G 7s.	13 metres (43 ft)	20884	E5877.4	10
Limassol New Port South Breakwater Lighthouse		n/a	Limassol; 34°39′01.4″N 33°01′58.2″E	Q (6) R 10s.	9 metres (30 ft)	20888	E5877	12
Paphos Lighthouse		1888	Paphos; 34°45′38.1″N 32°24′22.7″E	Fl W 15s.	36 metres (118 ft)	20836	E5908	17

=== Northern Cyprus ===
Name	Image	Year built	Location & coordinates	Class of light	Focal height	NGA number	Admiralty number	Range nml
Cape Andreas Lighthouse	Image	1991	Cape Apostolos Andreas; 35°42′36.9″N 34°36′22.2″E	Fl (4) W 20s.	20 metres (66 ft)	20968	E5900	14
Cape Elea Lighthouse		2002	Cape Apostolos Andreas; 35°19′29.7″N 34°02′50.0″E	Fl W 10s.	31 metres (102 ft)	20965	E5890	5
Cape Kormakitis Lighthouse	Image	1991	Cape Kormakitis; 35°24′11.8″N 32°55′14.9″E	Fl (2) W 20s.	30 metres (98 ft)	20976	E5904	15
Famagusta Northwest Karakol Lighthouse	Image	1906 est.	Famagusta; 35°08′31.4″N 33°55′35.1″E	Fl WR 7s.	18 metres (59 ft)	20944	E5892	white: 15 red: 11
Famagusta Southeast Bastion Lighthouse		1972	Famagusta 35°07′23.0″N 33°56′51.7″E	Fl (2) W 15s.	23 metres (75 ft)	20944	E5892	16
Kyrenia Lighthouse	Image	1994	Kyrenia; 35°20′30.3″N 33°19′53.2″E	Fl (3) R 20s.	18 metres (59 ft)	20971	E5901.6	20
Kyrenia North Breakwater Lighthouse	Image	n/a	Kyrenia; 35°20′31.0″N 33°20′14.6″E	Fl G 3s.	12 metres (39 ft)	20973	E5902.6	4
Kyrenia South Breakwater Lighthouse	Image	n/a	Kyrenia; 35°20′28.1″N 33°20′04.4″E	Fl R 3s.	12 metres (39 ft)	20973.5	E5902.4	4
Kyrenia West Mole New Lighthouse		1963	Kyrenia; 35°20′34.0″N 33°19′27.5″E	Fl G 5s.	10 metres (33 ft)	20972	E5902	4
Kyrenia West Mole Old Lighthouse		1907	Kyrenia; 35°20′36.2″N 33°19′11.5″E	inactive since 1963	(tower); 7 metres (23 ft)	n/a	n/a	n/a

=== Akrotiri and Dhekelia ===
Name	Image	Year built	Location & coordinates	Class of light	Focal height	NGA number	Admiralty number	Range nml
Cape Gata Lighthouse		1864	Cape Gata; 34°33′50.2″N 33°01′28.0″E	Fl W 5s.	58 metres (190 ft)	20856	E5876	15

== See also ==
- Lists of lighthouses and lightvessels
