= List of non-governmental organisations in Cyprus =

The following is a list of notable non-governmental organisations in Cyprus.

== Civil society ==
- Future Worlds Center
- KISA

== Cultural ==
- Pharos Arts Foundation
- Società Dante Alighieri Committee of Cyprus

== Environmental ==
- Cans For Kids

== Peace-promoting NGOs ==
- Cyprus Conflict Resolution Trainers Group
- Future Worlds Center

== Political organisations ==
- New Wave – The Other Cyprus
- Union of Cypriots

== Research organisations ==
- Cyprus Neuroscience and Technology Institute
- The Cyprus Institute
- The Cyprus Institute of Neurology and Genetics
- The Cyprus International Institute of Management
- The Cyprus Space Exploration Organisation (CSEO)
- Citizens in Power
