= Wildlife of Cyprus =

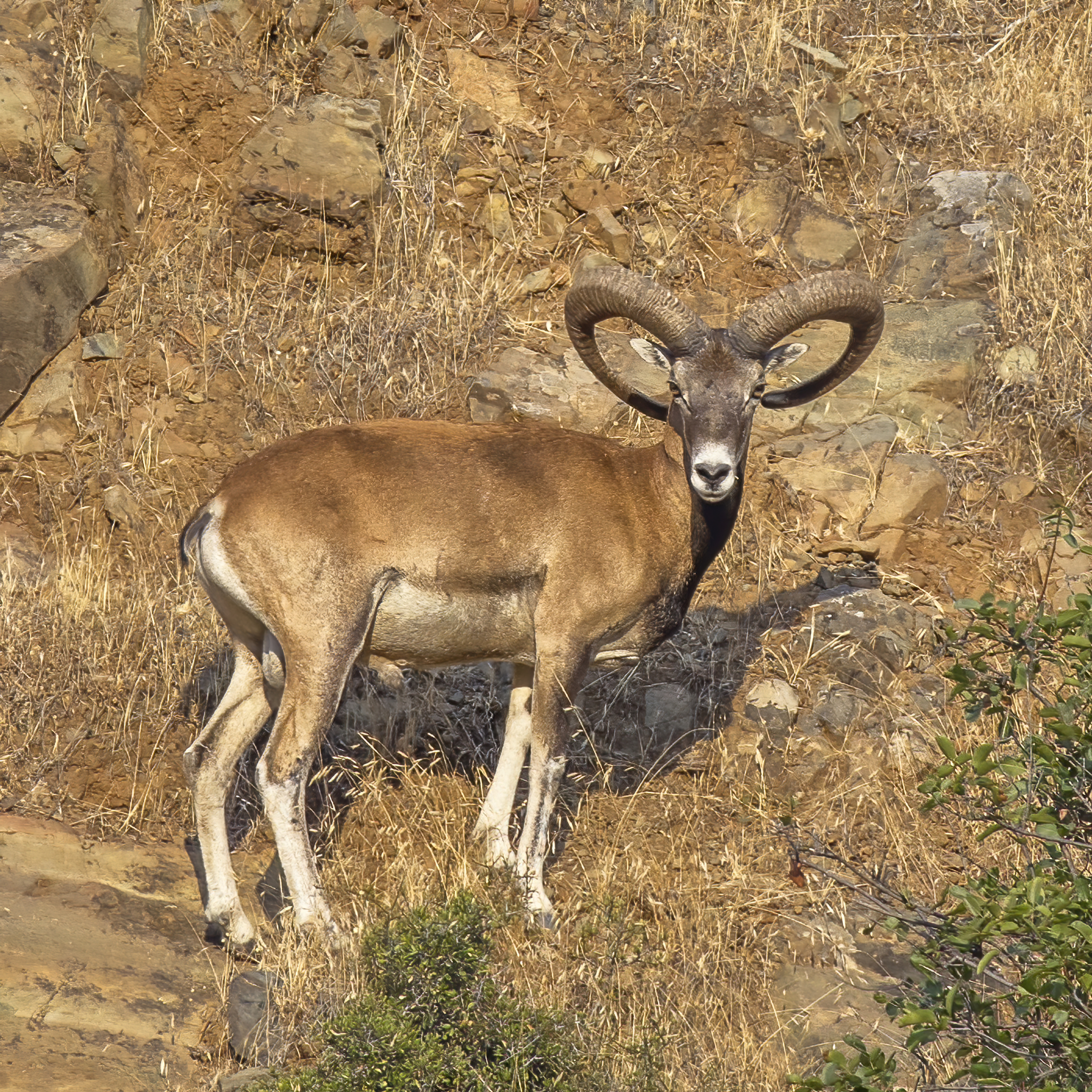
Male Cypriot mouflon

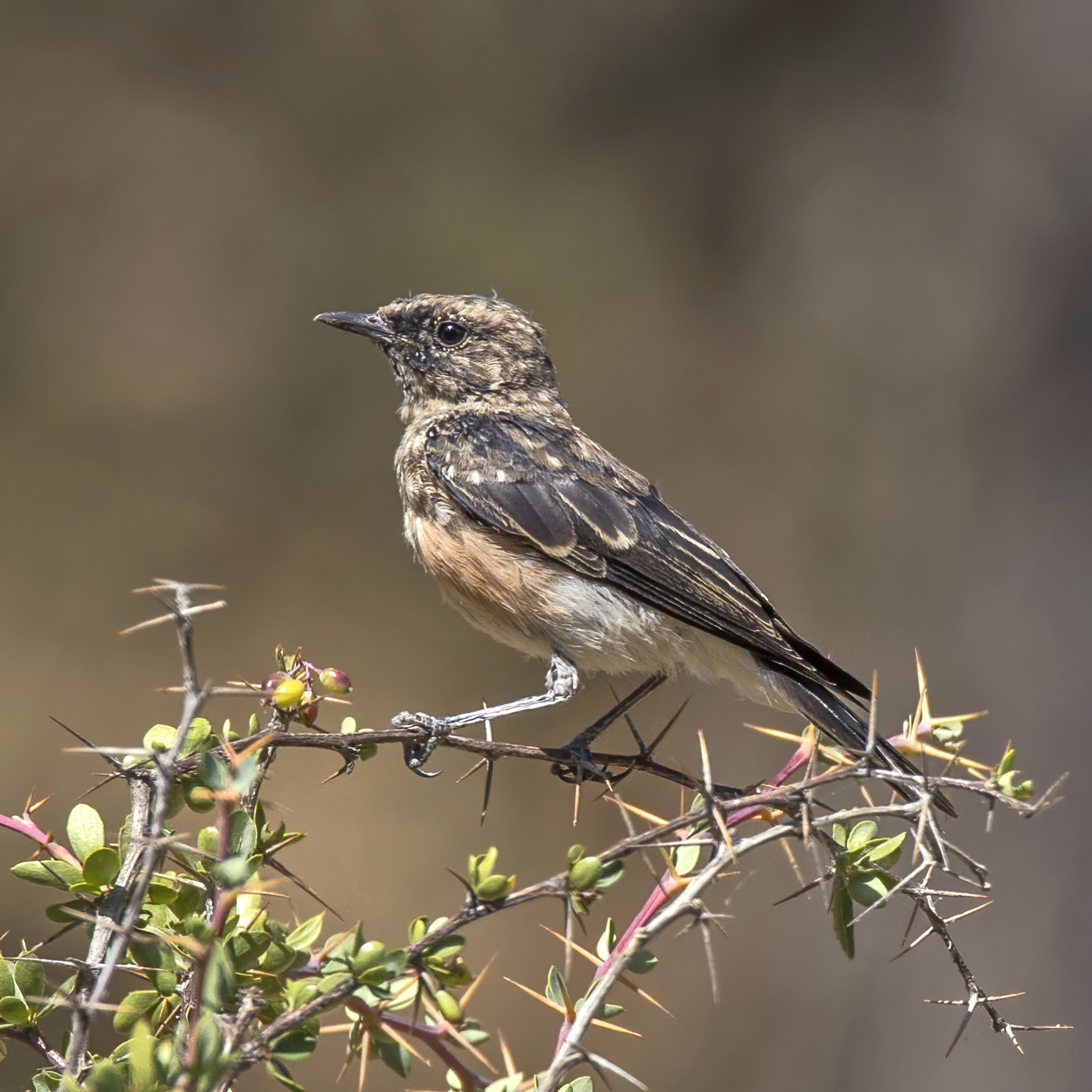
Cyprus wheatear

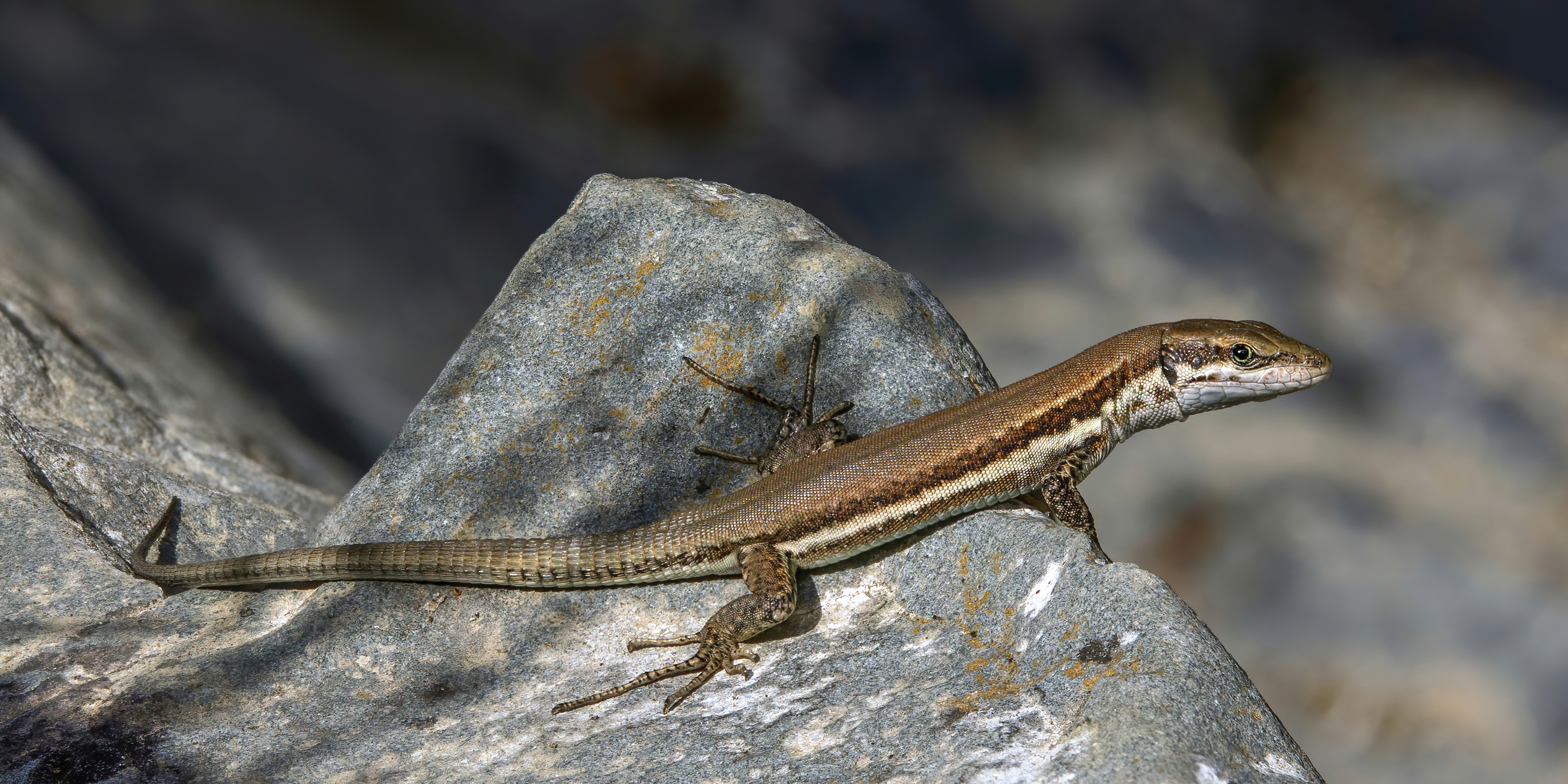
Troodos lizard

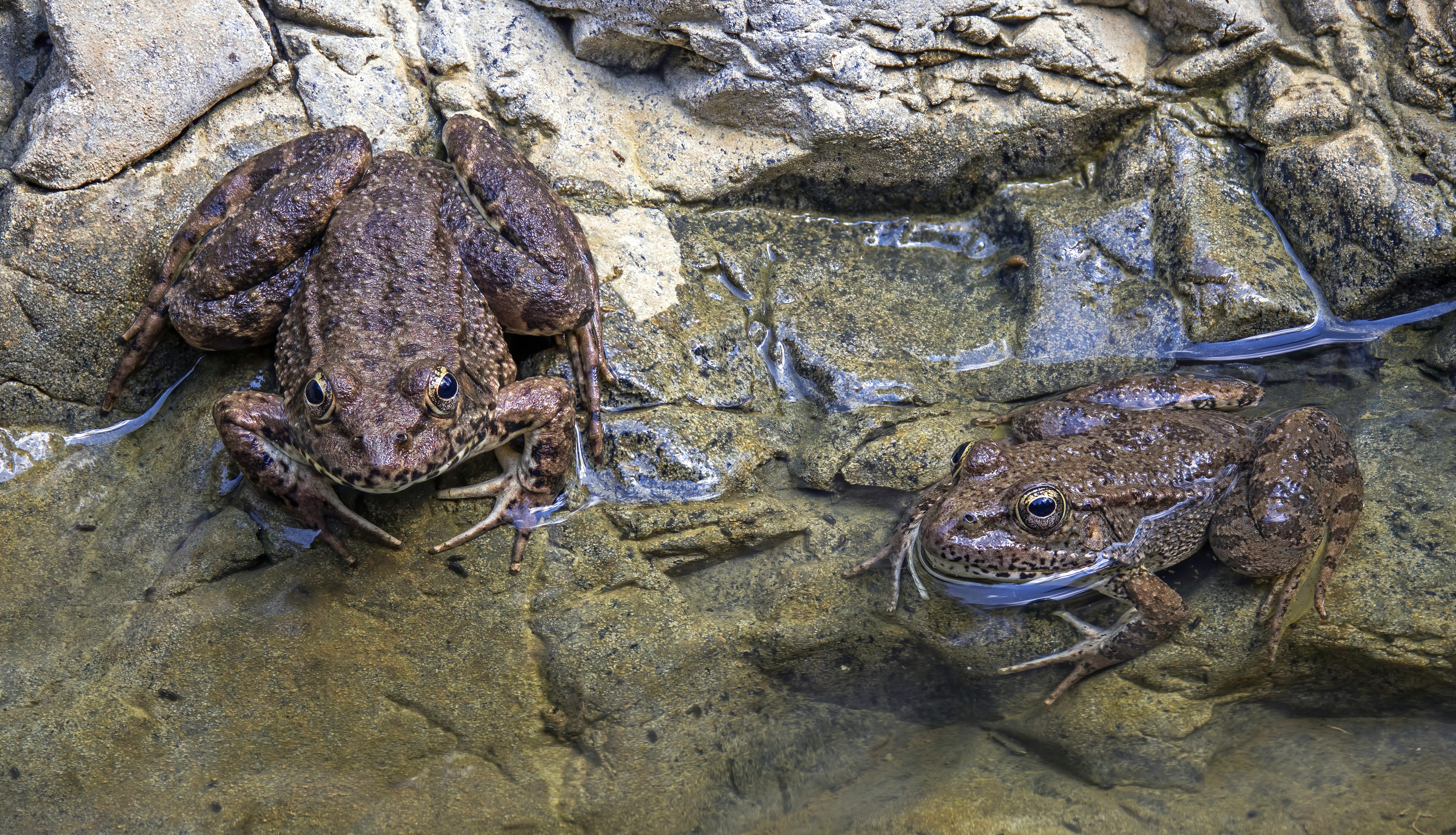
Cyprus water frogs

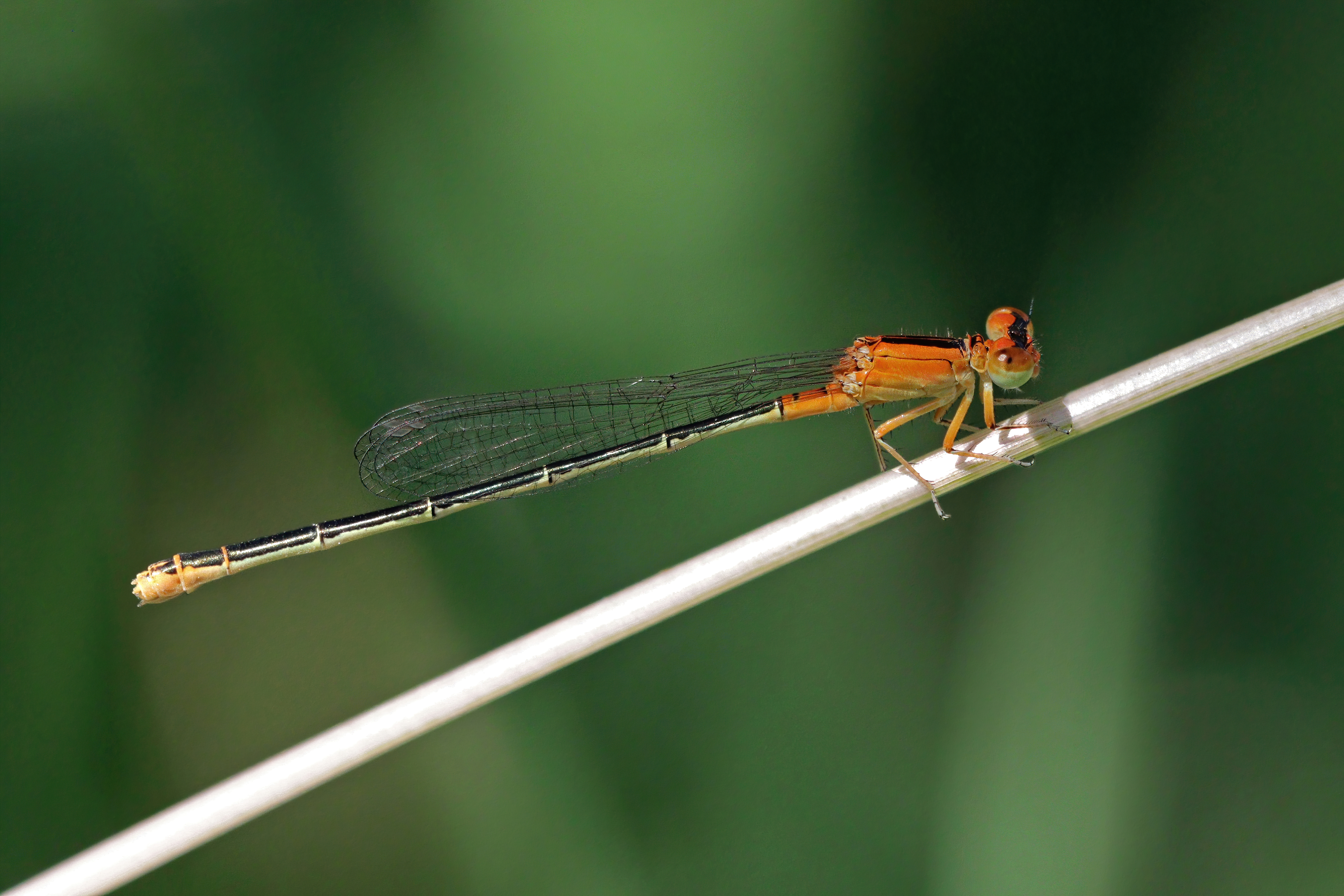
Female Persian blue damselfly

The wildlife of Cyprus includes its flora and fauna and their natural habitats. Cyprus has a rich flora and a diverse fauna albeit with relatively few mammals. Like most modern countries, the natural habitats in Cyprus have been steadily disappearing, currently retaining only 20% of its original habitat due to rapid urbanization, usage of forests for commercial purposes, tourism and various other reasons. One of the features of Cyprus' habitats is the wild and sharp differences in elevations and habitats on the island as well as climate, all of which supply a diverse habitat for an array of fauna and flora. Terra Cypria was established as a trust in 1992 to conserve the Cypriot environment and its biodiversity.

== Fauna ==
=== Amphibians ===
The fauna of Cyprus has four amphibians.

=== Birds ===
Cyprus also has over 380 species of bird due to being on migration routes between Africa, Europe and western Asia including Eleonora's falcon (Falco eleonorae), flamingo and the imperial eagle (Aquila heliaca). There are two endemic species of songbirds, the Cyprus warbler (Sylvia melanothorax) and the Cyprus wheatear (Oenanthe cypriaca). Both only breed on the island of Cyprus and migrate south to overwinter.

=== Mammals ===
Cyprus is currently home to 21 known mammals, of which three are endangered. The largest wild animal and mammal currently residing in Cyprus is the endemic Cypriot mouflon. Other notable mammals are the large endangered Mediterranean monk seal and the endemic Cypriot mouse, which is the only remaining endemic rodent on the Mediterranean islands. During the Late Pleistocene, the Cyprus dwarf hippopotamus, the Cyprus dwarf elephant and a species of genet (Genetta plesictoides) were also native to the island, but became extinct at the beginning of the Holocene, following the arrival of humans to Cyprus.

=== Reptiles ===
Most of the reptiles of Cyprus are harmless, and non-venomous such as the Cyprus whip snake (Hierophis cypriensis) and the European blind snake (Typhlops vermicularis). Other snakes, European cat snake (Telescopus fallax) and Montpellier snake (Malpolon monspessulanus) are nominally venomous, but neither aggressive nor particularly dangerous. In contrast, the Cyprian blunt-nosed viper, (Macrovipera lebetina lebetina), though not aggressive, is a large, front-fanged viper. Its bite is dangerous even to large mammals, including people. Three of the reptile species on Cyprus, including Macrovipera lebetina, are endangered.

Cyprus has several species of lizards and a few species of turtles such as loggerhead sea turtle (Caretta caretta).

=== Arachnids ===
Cyprus has an especially wide array of arachnids with around 60 species of spiders, including the European tarantula (Lycosa tarantula).

=== Insects ===
Mt Olympus (Chionístra) harbours several endemic weevils, including Melanobaris troodi Stüben, 2024, Otiorhynchus crassicollis Stierlin, 1861, Psallidium chionistrae Alziar, 2006, and Strophomorphus exophthalmus Pelletier, 1999.

== Flora ==
The flora of Cyprus contains about 1800 species, of which circa 128 are endemic. The flora also include invasive species such as prickly pears and the yellow oxalis.
