= Kleides Islands =

Coordinates: 35.7066064476°N 34.6034155096°E

Kleides (also spelled Cleides, Klides, Clides, Klidhes, Clidhes, Kleidhes, Cleidhes; Ancient Greek: Κλεῖδες and Κληῖδες), meaning keys in Greek, is a group of small rocky uninhabited islands at the north of Cyprus. Some ancient writers called them the "edge of Cyprus" or "far end of Cyprus" (ἄκρα τῆς Κύπρου). Herodotus in his work Histories wrote that during the Ionian revolt the whole island of Cyprus, except Amathus, also revolted against the Persians. Persians in response send army and navy to deal with the Ionian and Cypriot forces on the island and the Phoenician fleet sailed around the "Keys of Cyprus" (Κληῖδες τῆς Κύπρου). Strabo writes that the Kleides were two isles lying off Cyprus opposite the eastern parts of the island, which are seven hundred stadia distant from the Pyramos river. Pliny the Elder, writes that they were four islands. In reality the islets are six, but the three can be considered more like rocks in the sea than islets. The islands are also mentioned by the Ptolemy in his work Geography, Hesychius of Alexandria in his lexicon and Agathemerus in his Sketch of Geography. A poem in the Greek Anthology also mentions the islands.

Some writers, such as Agathemenos, Hesychios and Herodotus used the name Kleides not only for the islands but also for the cape itself, Pliny calls this headland Dinaretum, while Stadiasmus simply calls it Akra and Ptolemy names it Boosura (Βοόσουρα or Οὐρὰ Βοός, "Ox’s Tail") However, the Palatine manuscript of Ptolemy preserves the reading Kleides (Κλεῖδες). The cape is today known as Cape Saint Andreas. Archaeologists have also found an ancient coin with the inscription "Kleides".

Modern writers also refer to the Kleides Islands by name, including:

- Florio Bustron (1550 - 1570) in his work Chronique de l'Île de Chypre de Florio Bustron.
- Stefano Lusignan in his Description de toute l'isle de Cypre, published in 1580.
- Luigi Palma di Cesnola in the Cyprus : its ancient cities, tombs, and temples : a narrative of researches and excavations during ten years' residence as American consul in that island, published in 1877.
- David George Hogarth in the Devia Cypria, which was published in 1889.
- Franz Felix Adalbert Kuhn (1812 - 1881) in the Zeitschrift für vergleichende Sprachforschung auf dem Gebiete der Indogermanischen Sprachen.
- Charles Vincent Bellamy and Alfred John Jukes-Browne in The geology of Cyprus in 1905.
- George H. Everett Jeffery in the A description of the historic monuments of Cyprus. Studies in the archaeology and architecture of the island, published in 1918, described his trip to the islets:

"The Kleides Islands. — The extremity of the "Oxtail" promontory of the Carpass is formed by a small group of rocks dignified by the name of the "Keys of Cyprus". I was rowed out to the islands, coasting round the cliffs, and looking down through two hundred feet of clear sea on to every shell or weed on the bottom. But I had to be content with the marvellous scenes of the voyage for the islands afforded me nothing more than a superb view of the Cilician and Syrian coasts divided by a hazy gap which marked the bay of Iskanderun. Three of the six islands are mere reefs washed from end to end by the swell which seems to heave always round Cape St. Andreas; of the remainder one is very small, not more than a few yards in diameter, but just raised enough out of the water to support a scanty vegetation; another, somewhat larger, is divided from the mainland by a channel only a few feet wide, and is a mere mass of shingle cemented together and covered with stunted undergrowth. The last and largest lies nearly a mile out, and is covered with 'schinia' shrubs and grass and inhabited by countless sea birds."

During the British occupation of Cyprus, a lighthouse was built on one of the islets.

BirdLife International identified the Kleides Islands as an Important Bird Area.
