= List of companies of Cyprus =

Location of Cyprus

Cyprus is an island country in the Eastern Mediterranean and the third largest and third most populous island in the Mediterranean. Cyprus is a major tourist destination in the Mediterranean. With an advanced, high-income economy and a very high Human Development Index, the Republic of Cyprus has been a member of the Commonwealth since 1961 and was a founding member of the Non-Aligned Movement until it joined the European Union on 1 May 2004. On 1 January 2008, the Republic of Cyprus joined the eurozone.

== Notable firms ==
This list includes notable companies with primary headquarters located in the country. The industry and sector follow the Industry Classification Benchmark taxonomy. Organizations which have ceased operations are included and noted as defunct.

Notable companies Status: P=Private, S=State; A=Active, D=Defunct
| Name | Industry | Sector | Headquarters | Founded | Notes | Status | |
|---|---|---|---|---|---|---|---|
| 3CX | Technology | Software | Nicosia | 2005 | Communication system | P | A |
| AC Omonia | Consumer services | Sports | Nicosia | 1948 | Football | P | A |
| AEK Larnaca FC | Consumer services | Sports | Larnaca | 1994 | Football | P | A |
| AEL F.C. | Consumer services | Sports | Limassol | 1930 | Football | P | A |
| Allbiz | Industrials | Business support services | Nicosia | 1999 | Business-to-business portal | P | A |
| Anorthosis F.C. | Consumer services | Sports | Larnaca | 1911 | Football | P | A |
| APOEL B.C. | Consumer services | Sports | Nicosia | 1947 | Basketball | P | A |
| APOEL FC | Consumer services | Sports | Nicosia | 1926 | Football | P | A |
| APOEL V.C. | Consumer services | Sports | Nicosia | 1928 | Volleyball | P | A |
| Apollon Limassol | Consumer services | Sports | Limassol | 1954 | Football | P | A |
| Armida Publications | Consumer services | Publishing | Nicosia | 1997 | Magazine and book publishing | P | A |
| ASBIS | Technology | Computer hardware | Limassol | 1990 | Hardware and electronics | P | A |
| Austrian Lloyd Ship Management | Industrials | Marine transportation | Limassol | 1991 | Shipping | P | A |
| Bank of Cyprus | Financials | Banks | Nicosia | 1899 | Bank | P | A |
| Celestyal Cruises | Consumer services | Travel & tourism | Limassol | 1986 | Cruise line | P | A |
| Central Bank of Cyprus | Financials | Banks | Nicosia | 1963 | Central bank | S | A |
| Charlie Airlines | Consumer services | Travel & Leisure | Larnaca | 2016 | Airline | P | A |
| Cyprus Broadcasting Corporation | Consumer services | Broadcasting | Nicosia | 1953 | Public broadcasting | S | A |
| Cyprus Civil Aviation Authority | Consumer services | Air traffic management | Nicosia | 1955 | Civil aviation | S | A |
| Cyprus College | Consumer services | Education | Nicosia | 1961 | College | P | A |
| Cyprus College of Art | Consumer services | Education | Paphos | 1969 | Arts Centre | P | A |
| Cyprus Development Bank | Financials | Banks | Nicosia | 1963 | Bank | P | A |
| Cyprus Int. Instit. for Environ. & Public Health | Technology | Research | Limassol | 2004 | Research institute | P | A |
| Cyprus Internet Exchange | Telecommunications | Fixed line telecom | Nicosia | 1999 | ISP | P | A |
| Cyprus Mail | Consumer services | Publishing | Nicosia | 1945 | Cyprus English newspaper | P | A |
| Cyprus Mines Corporation | Basic materials | General mining | Nicosia | 1916 | Mining, acquired in 1979 | P | D |
| Cyprus Neuroscience and Technology Institute | Technology | Research | Nicosia | 1991 | Research institute | P | A |
| Cyprus News Agency | Consumer services | Media | Nicosia | 1976 | New agency | S | A |
| Cyprus Ports Authority | Consumer services | Ship traffic management | Nicosia | 1973 | Supervision of port facilities | S | A |
| Cyprus Postal Services | Industrials | Delivery services | Nicosia | - | Postal services, courier | S | A |
| Cyprus State Fairs Authority | Consumer services | General retailers | Nicosia | 1968 | Specialty retailers | S | A |
| Cyprus Stock Exchange | Financials | Investment services | Nicosia | 1996 | Exchange | P | A |
| Cyprus University of Technology | Consumer services | Education | Limassol | 2004 | University | S | A |
| Cyprus Weekly | Consumer services | Publishing | Nicosia | 1979 | Cyprus English newspaper | P | A |
| CYTA | Telecommunications | Fixed line telecom | Nicosia | 1961 | Cyprus Telecommunications | S | A |
| Doxa Katokopias FC | Consumer services | Sports | Peristerona | 1954 | Football | P | A |
| Electricity Authority of Cyprus | Utilities | Conventional electricity | Nicosia | 1952 | Power utility | P | A |
| Elias Neocleous & Co LLC | Consumer services | Legal | Limassol | 2017 | Law firm | P | A |
| EuroAfrica Interconnector | Utilities | Electricity | Nicosia | 2017 | Infrastructure | P | A |
| EuroAsia Interconnector | Utilities | Electricity | Nicosia | 2010 | Infrastructure | P | A |
| European University Cyprus | Consumer services | Education | Nicosia | 1961 | University | P | A |
| Financial Mirror | Consumer services | Publishing | Nicosia | 1993 | Magazine | P | A |
| Frederick University | Consumer services | Education | Limassol | 1965 | University | P | A |
| Joannou & Paraskevaides | Industrials | Heavy construction | Guernsey | 1961 | Construction | P | A |
| Health Insurance Organisation | Financials | Full line insurance | Nicosia | - | Commercial insurance | S | A |
| Hellenic Bank | Financials | Banks | Nicosia | 1976 | Bank | P | A |
| Imperio Properties | Financials | Real estate development | Limassol | 2003 | Real estate development | P | A |
| KEO | Consumer goods | Soft drinks | Limassol | 1927 | Beverage company | P | A |
| Larnaca International Airport | Consumer services | Travel & leisure | Larnaca | 1975 | Mass transit | P | A |
| Leon Beer | Consumer goods | Brewers | Nicosia | 1937 | Brewery | P | A |
| Leptos Estates | Financials | Real estate development | Paphos | 1960 | Property development | P | A |
| Lois Builders | Industrials | Heavy construction | Nicosia | 1977 | Construction | P | A |
| Medochemie | Health care | Pharmaceuticals | Limassol | 1976 | Pharmaceuticals | P | A |
| METRO Foods Trading | Consumer services | Food retailers & wholesalers | Nicosia | 1982 | Supermarket | P | A |
| Moufflon Publications | Consumer services | Publishing | Nicosia | 1967 | Independent press | P | A |
| Neapolis University Paphos | Consumer services | Education | Paphos | 2007 | University | P | A |
| NOVA Cyprus | Consumer services | Media | Nicosia | 2004 | Broadcasting & entertainment | P | A |
| Omega TV Cyprus | Consumer services | Media | Nicosia | 1992 | Broadcasting & entertainment | P | A |
| Open University of Cyprus | Consumer services | Education | Nicosia | 2002 | University | S | A |
| Pafos FC | Consumer services | Sports | Pafos | 2014 | Football | P | A |
| Paphos General Hospital | Consumer services | Health | Paphos | 1992 | Hospital | S | A |
| Paphos International Airport | Consumer services | Travel & leisure | Paphos | 2008 | Mass transit | P | A |
| Petrolina | Oil & gas | Exploration & production | Larnaca | 1959 | Oil & gas | P | A |
| Pevex Management | Financials | Investment services | Nicosia | 2008 | Financial services | P | A |
| Port of Limassol | Industrials | Industrial transportation | Limassol | 1956 | Transportation services | S | A |
| PrimeTel PLC | Telecommunications | Fixed line telecom | Nicosia | 2003 | Telecom | P | A |
| RCB Bank | Financials | Banks | Limassol | 1995 | Bank | P | A |
| Rusal | Basic materials | Industrial metals & mining | Nicosia | 2007 | Aluminium | P | A |
| SAT-7 | Consumer services | Broadcasting & entertainment | Nicosia | 1995 | International Christian satellite television | P | A |
| Telepassport Telecommunications | Telecommunications | Fixed line telecom | Nicosia | 2002 | Telecom | P | A |
| The American Heart Institute | Consumer services | Health | Strovolos | 1999 | Hospital | P | A |
| The Cyprus Institute | Technology | Research | Nicosia | 2005 | Research institute | P | A |
| The Muscular Dystropy Research Foundation | Technology | Research | Nicosia | 1987 | Research institute | S | A |
| The Cyprus Institute of Neurology and Genetics | Technology | Research | Nicosia | 1990 | Research institute | S | A |
| Tsokkos | Consumer services | Hospitality | Ayia Napa | 1979 | Hotels | P | A |
| Tus Airways | Consumer services | Travel & Leisure | Larnaca | 2015 | Airline | P | A |
| Universal Life | Financials | Life insurance | Nicosia | 1970 | Insurance | P | A |
| University of Cyprus | Consumer services | Education | Nicosia | 1989 | University | S | A |
| University of Nicosia | Consumer services | Education | Nicosia | 1980 | University | P | A |
| Wargaming | Technology | Software | Nicosia | 1998 | Games developer | P | A |
| Woolworth | Financials | Real estate development | Nicosia | 1974 | Real estate development | P | A |
| xHamster | Technology | Software | Nicosia | 2007 | Pornographic service | P | A |

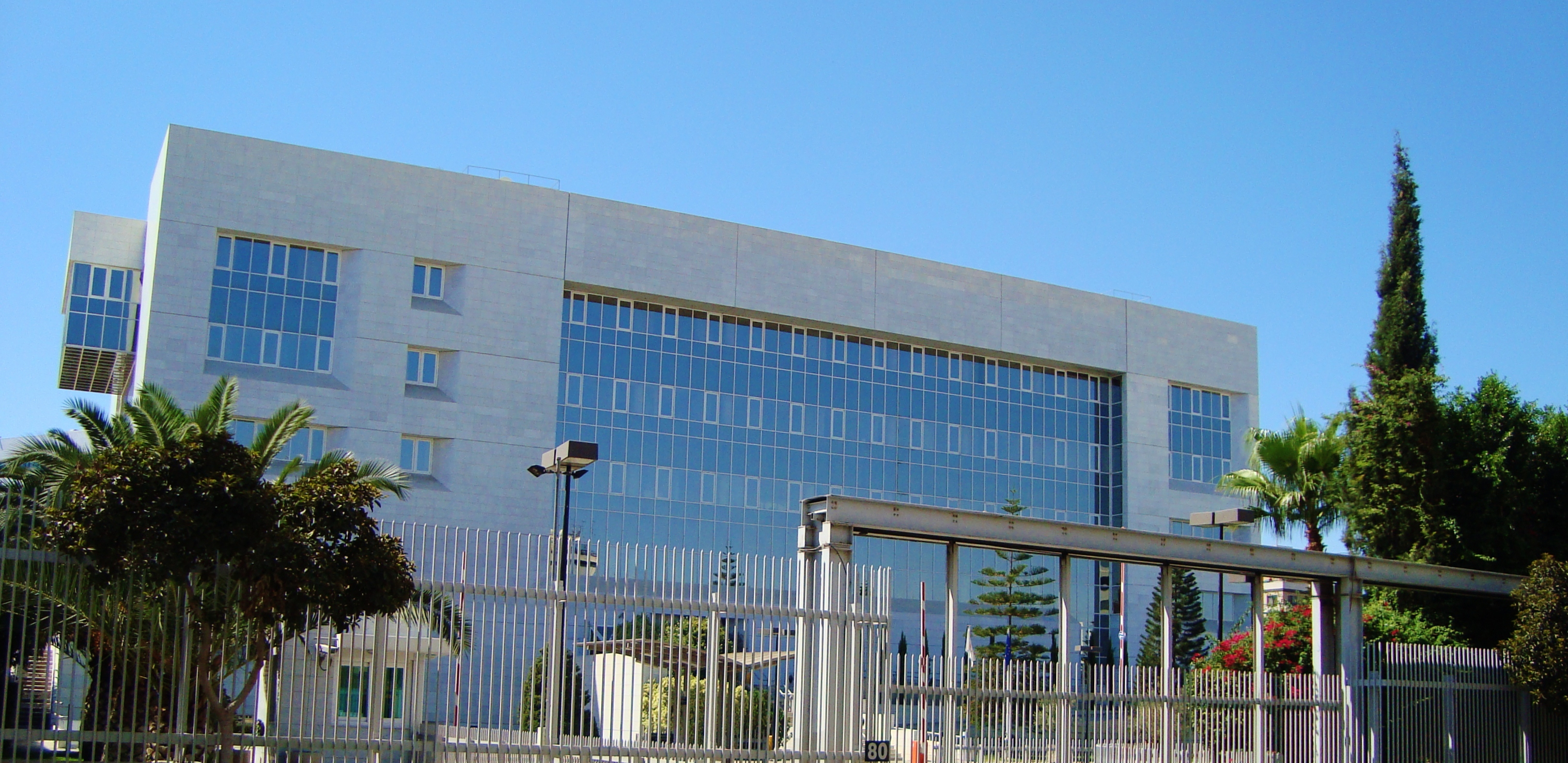
Central Bank of Cyprus in Nicosia.

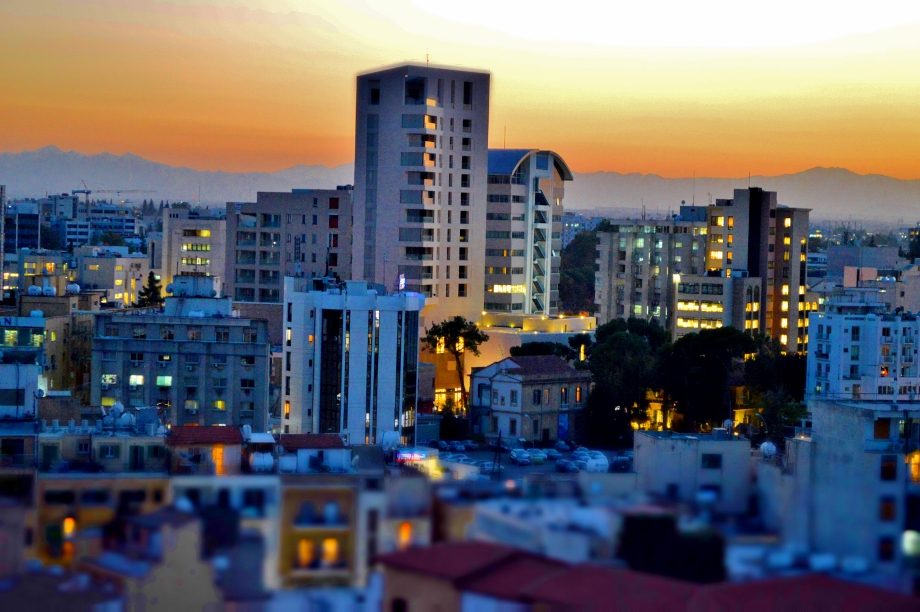
View of Nicosia Financial quarter.

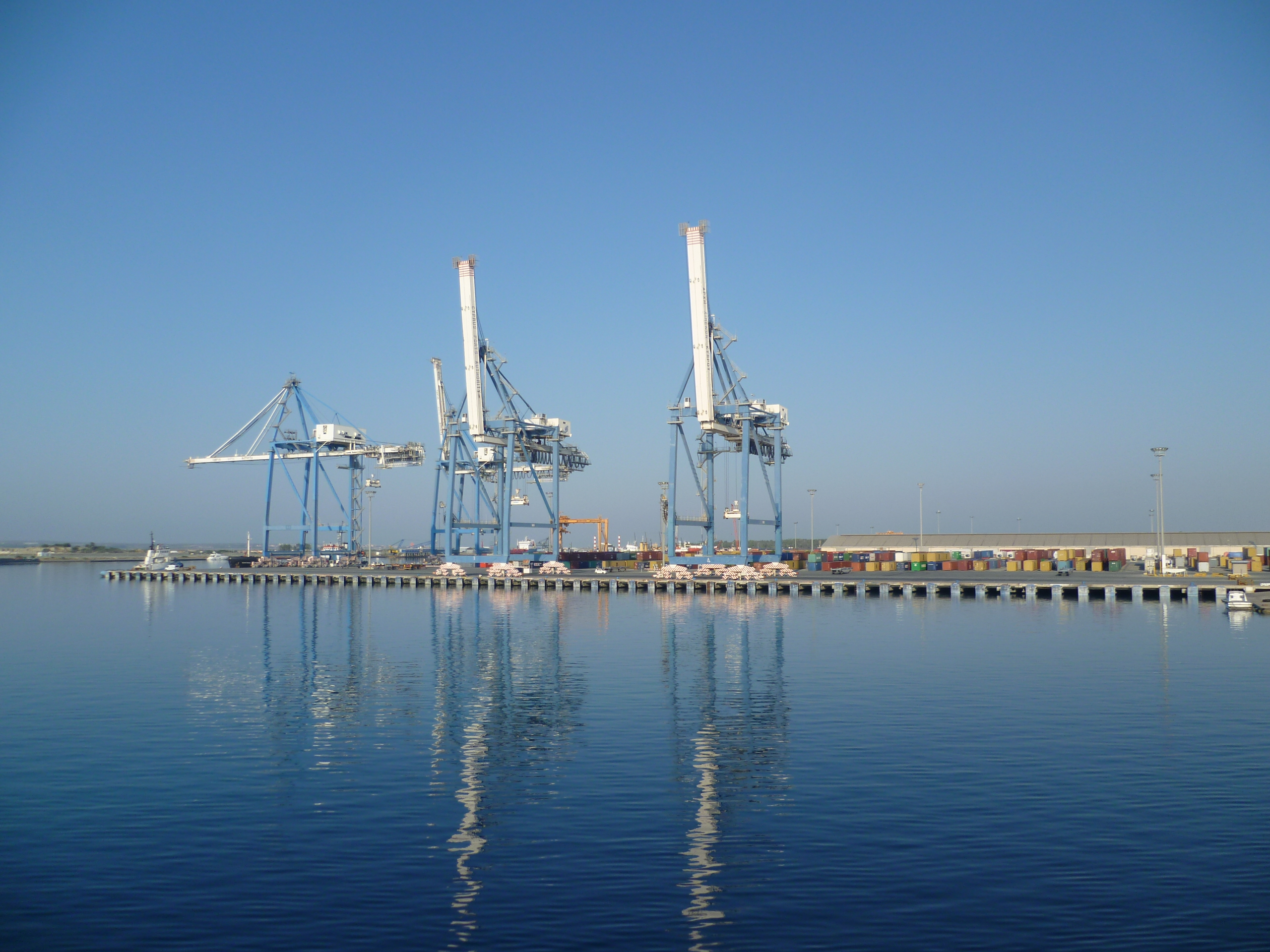
The port of Limassol, the busiest in Cyprus

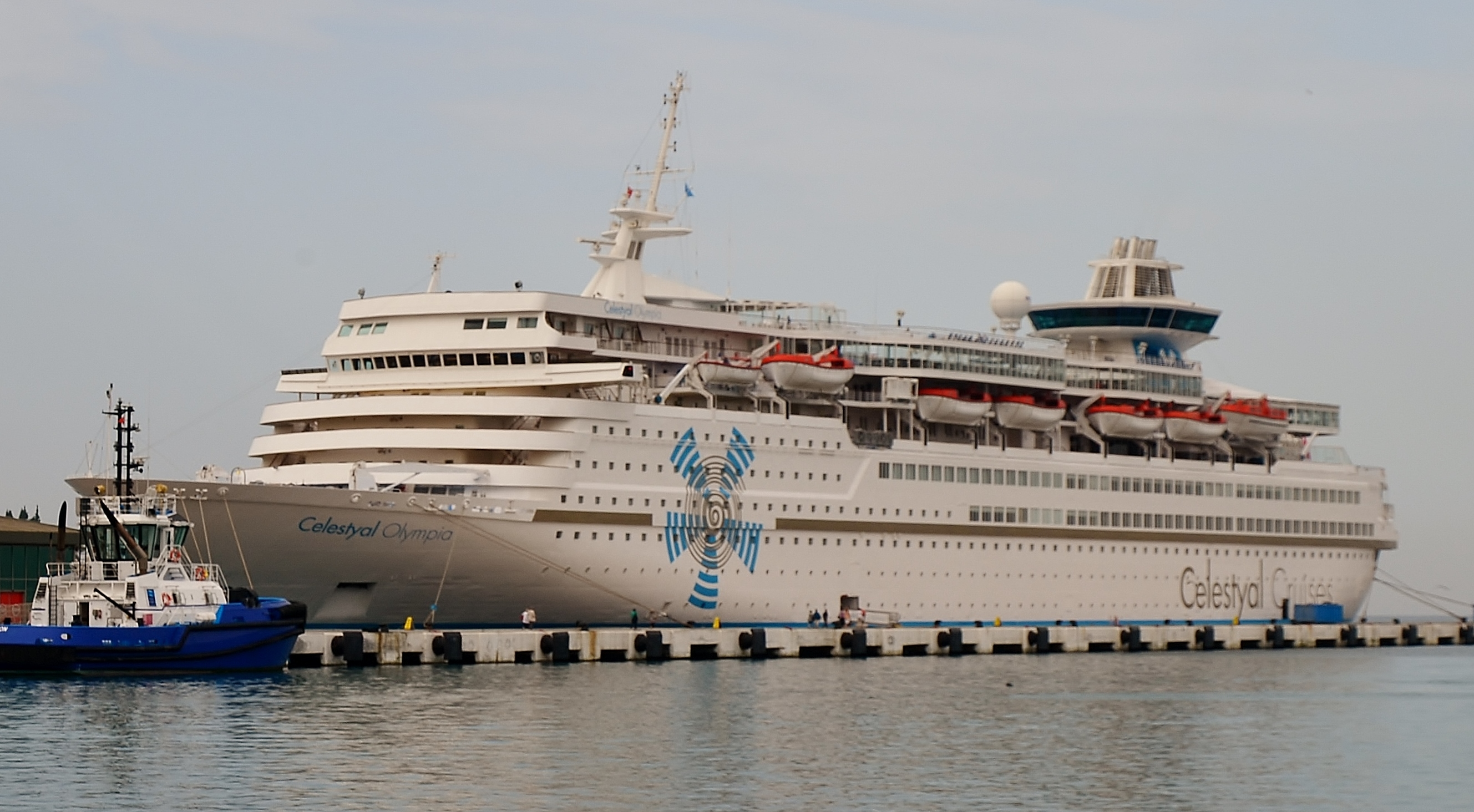
Celestyal Cruises ship MS Celestyal Olympia.

== See also ==
- List of airlines of Cyprus
- List of banks in Cyprus
