= Nouritza Matossian =

Nouritza Matossian (born April 1945) is a British Cypriot (of Armenian descent) writer, actress, broadcaster and human rights activist. She writes on the arts, contemporary music, history and Armenia.

She spent her childhood in Cyprus with her Armenian family. Educated in England, she graduated with Honours in Philosophy (B.Phil.) from Bedford College, University of London, then studied music, theatre and mime in Dartington and Paris; she has a command of nine languages. She was married to composer Rolf Gehlhaar. Their son is product designer and music specialist Vahakn Matossian-Gehlhaar.

Matossian published the first biography and critical study of the Greek composer Iannis Xenakis, the source book on his life, architecture and music based on ten years' collaboration with him. She later adapted it into a 50-minute documentary for BBC2, entitled Something Rich and Strange.

Matossian's 1998 book Black Angel, The Life of Arshile Gorky was written after twenty years' research. Ararat, the award-winning film by Atom Egoyan and Miramax, was partly inspired by Black Angel. She acted as consultant to Egoyan who modelled the female lead role Ani on her. Matossian also wrote and performs a solo show on Gorky's life from the viewpoint of his four beloved women with images and music. It has been produced worldwide over 80 times at venues including the Barbican, Tate Modern, London, New York City, Los Angeles, the Edinburgh Festival, Cyprus, Paris, Lebanon, Iran, Romania and Georgia. In Armenia she performed it simultaneously in two languages.

Matossian broadcasts on the BBC and contributes to several newspapers and magazines, including The Independent, The Guardian, The Economist, and The Observer. She was Honorary Cultural Attache for the Armenian Embassy in London from 1991 to 2000.

== Publications ==
Monographs:

- Iannis Xenakis Fayard, Paris, 1981
- Xenakis, Kahn & Averill, London 1985, 1991, paperback; Pro Am, NY.
- Xenakis, Moufflon Publications, Cyprus, 2005
- Black Angel, The Life of Arshile Gorky Chatto & Windus, Random House, 1998; Pimlico
