= MyNet =

MyNet may refer to:

- MyNetworkTV, USA
- Mynet, an Israeli news service and subsidiary of Ynet, providing local news
- the internet service of Telepassport Telecommunications, Cyprus
