= Kazem Behbehani =

Kuwaiti immunologist and former WHO envoy

- Born: 1943 (age 82–83); Kuwait City, Kuwait
- Education: Kuwait University, Medical School
- Awards: Knight Commander of the Order of the British Empire
- Scientific career
- Fields: Immunology and Tropical diseases
- Workplaces: Dasman Diabetes Institute

Kazem Behbehani (Arabic: كاظم بهبهاني; born 1943) is a Kuwaiti immunologist and retired professor. He is known for his research on tropical diseases before he became International Health Advocate at WHO.

== Early life and education ==
Behbehani was born in Kuwait City, studied medicine at the Universities of Kuwait, Liverpool and London University and received a PhD in Immunology in 1972.

He was a Post Doctoral Fellow at the London School of Hygiene and Tropical Medicine and the Mathilda and Terence Kennedy Institute of Rheumatology in London. He married Dr Sabikah Abdulrazzaq and has two daughters Faye and Farah. He also has five grandchildren, Jana, Bader, Mohammed, Lana and Leia.

== Career ==
In 1983, Behbehani returned to Kuwait and joined University of Kuwait, Medical School, where he eventually became Professor of Immunology and tropical diseases. At the University level he held the following posts: Vice President for Research, Vice Dean of the Faculty of Science, Vice Dean (Research) of the Faculty of Medicine and member of the university council. During these years, he also became a visiting professor at Harvard Medical School (1979–1984).

After the Invasion of Kuwait in 1990 Kazem Behbehani had to flee Kuwait and joined the WHO. At WHO (1990–2005), he worked in the vaccine research of the Global programmed of AIDS, was the Programme Manager of Tropical Disease Research (TDR), the Director of both the Division of the Control of Tropical Diseases (1994–1998) and, the Eastern Mediterranean Liaison Office (1998–2003) in Geneva. He served as a member of the WHO Board of Appeal, Secretary of number of Intergovernmental meetings (e.g. Tobacco Convention), as well as several of the committees/subcommittees of the Executive Board and the World Health Assembly. His last position was Assistant Director-General for External Relations and Governing Bodies (2003 - 5). In 2005, he became WHO Envoy. In 2006 he became official candidate in the WHO Director General election, where he succeeded to reach the top 5 list.

Beside his WHO work he became member of many national and international advisory boards like the Scientific Advisory Board of the Cyprus International Institute for Environmental and Public Health; chairman of the International Atomic Energy Agency – IAEA’s External Panel for the Evaluation of Human Health Programme (2005); member of the International Agency for Research on Cancer – IARC’s Ethics Review Committee (2005–2009) or member of the board of Baroness Nicholson and J.K. Rowling’s Children’s High Level Group.

== Scientific merits and awards ==
Over the years Behbehani has developed close working relationships with various agencies and international bodies including Aga Khan Fund for Economic Development, OPEC Fund for International Development, Kuwait Fund for Arab Economic Development, Arab Fund for Economic and Social Development and the World Bank.

He is the recipient of several awards and scientific recognitions, including the Kuwait Foundation for the Advancement of Science's (KFAS) Best Researcher in Medicine. He served as a member of the Editorial Board of a number of scientific journals. He has more than 100 scientific publications and one book on science and technology to his credit. He is a Fellow of the Royal College of Pathologists (FRCPath) (1995) and Fellow of the Islamic Academy of Sciences (1992). The Cyprus International Institute for the Environment and Public Health in Association with Harvard School of Public Health has awarded him with an honorary degree of Master of Science in Environmental health in 2009. In 2016 Kazem received an Order of the British Empire from Her Majesty Queen Elizabeth for his services to UK/Kuwait Healthcare cooperation.

== Books ==
- Proceedings of the Symposium on Science and Technology for Development in Kuwait (1981) Longman (ISBN 0582783259)
