= List of hospitals in Cyprus =

This is a list of hospitals in Cyprus.

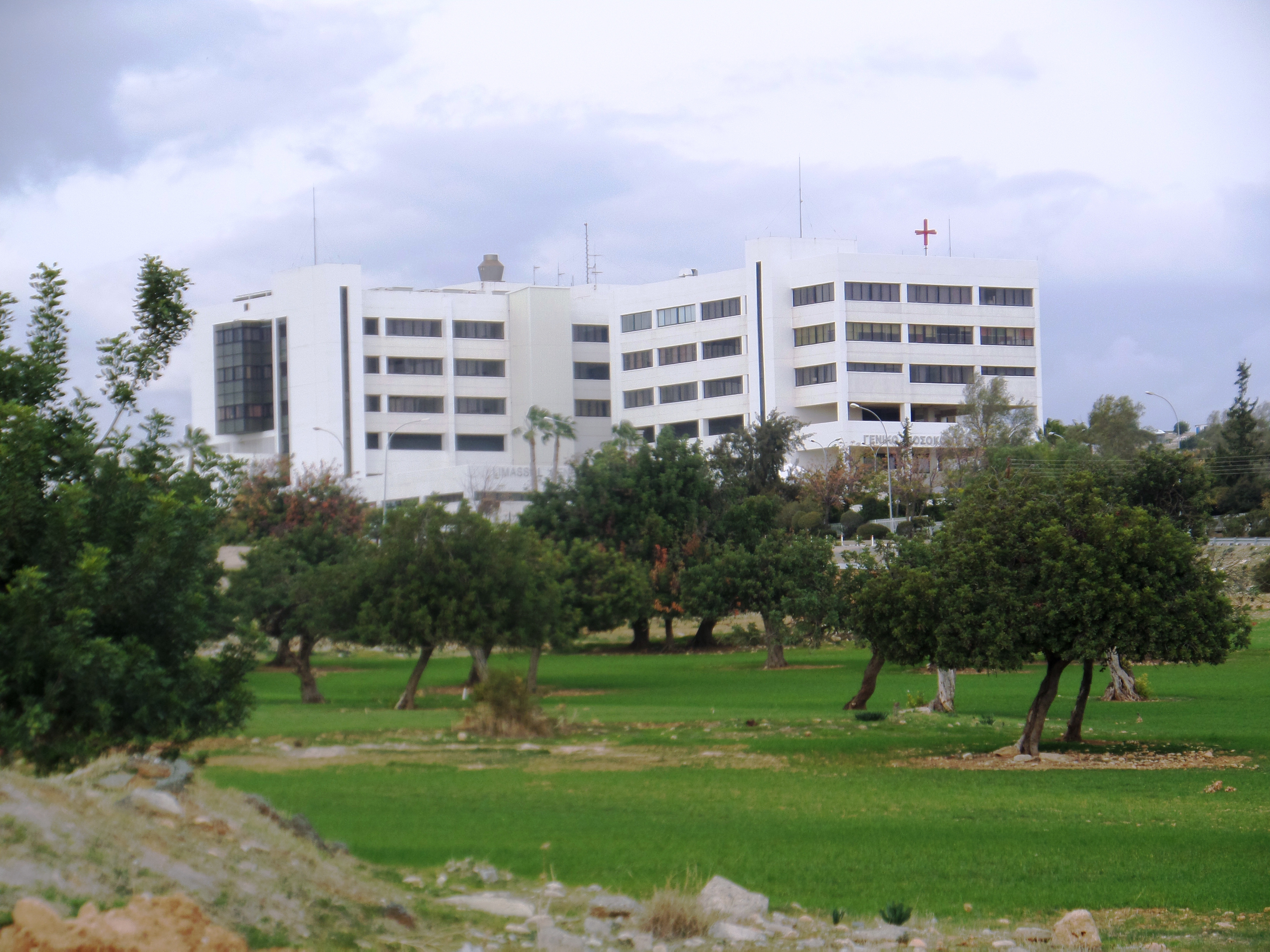
Limassol New General Hospital

== Urban hospitals ==
SHSO (State Health Services Organisation or OKYPY) Hospitals

- Nicosia New General Hospital
- Nicosia Old General Hospital
- Makarios Paediatric Hospital, Nicosia
- Limassol New General Hospital
- Limassol Old General Hospital
- Larnaca New General Hospital
- Larnaca Old General Hospital
- Paphos General Hospital

Private Hospitals

- Mediterranean Hospital of Cyprus, Limassol
- Nicosia Polyclinic, Nicosia
- Aretaeio Hospital, Nicosia
- Apollonion Private Hospital, Nicosia
- Hippocrateion Private Hospital, Nicosia
- American Heart Institute, Nicosia
- Ygia Polyclinic, Limassol
- Saint Raphael Private Hospital, Larnaca
- Iasis Hospital, Paphos

== Rural hospitals and medical centres ==
- Agros
- Akaki
- Athienou
- Avdimou
- Dali
- Drouseia
- Evrychou
- Fyti
- Kampos
- Klirou
- Kofinou
- Kyperounta
- Laneia
- Pano Lefkara
- Omodos
- Ormidia
- Palaiochori
- Panagia
- Paralimni
- Pedoulas
- Platres
- Polis
- Pomos
- Pyrgos
- Salamiou
- Tersefanou
