= Nicosia Old General Hospital =

Coordinates: 35.172°N 33.353°E

Geography
- Location: Central, Nicosia, Cyprus

Organisation
- Care system: Social Security
- Type: General
- Affiliated university: None

Services
- Emergency department: Yes

History
- Founded: 1936
- Closed: 2006
- Demolished: 2010

Links
- Lists: Hospitals in Cyprus

Nicosia Old General Hospital was the chief hospital of Nicosia, Cyprus from 1936 to 2006. In 2006, its patients were transferred to the Nicosia New General Hospital, and it was demolished in 2010 amidst some controversy over whether it should have been preserved.

The decision for erecting a purpose built general hospital in Nicosia was taken during the British colonial administration of Cyprus in 1936. It was inaugurated on 14 April 1939 by the then British governor Richard Palmer. This coincided with the breakout of World War II and many British and Cypriot soldiers were transported there, away from the front line, for recovery. Cyprus escaped the fighting, apart from the occasional German bombing raid.

The building, designed by Polyvios Michaelides was one of the first structures in Cyprus to import the Bauhaus style of architecture from Germany and featured in the French journal L’Architecture d’aujourd’hui.

The hospital served as a tertiary referral centre for most disciplines. Over time and with scientific and medical advances, it became apparent that the hospital premises were not fit for purpose. A Nicosia New General Hospital was constructed in the suburb of Latsia and was delivered in 2006. The last remaining patients were transferred over and the old hospital closed its emergency department on 8 October 2006, after 67 years of operation having treated millions of patients. It continues to run outpatients clinics and a psychiatric ward.

The fate of the old building has recently been surrounded by controversy. It lies in the centre of Nicosia on prime real estate and surrounded by dense eucalyptus woodland. The Cyprus Green Party has been campaigning for the building’s preservation, as it is considered as one of the few remaining examples of colonial architecture. Plans to demolish it and to erect a new Cyprus Museum have been criticized by the Cyprus Architects Association, that has also championed its preservation. The building was finally demolished and the contractor Philippos Kameris confirmed on 15 June 2010 that the work was completed.
