= Cyprus Ports Authority =

Government agency of Cyprus

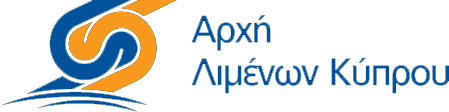
- Company type: Semi-government organization (Name of state-owned companies in Cyprus)
- Industry: Ports
- Founded: 1973; 53 years ago
- Headquarters: Nicosia, Cyprus
- Area served: Cyprus
- Key people: Dr. Antonis St. Stylianou (Chairman)
- Services: Ports management
- Revenue: ▲€69.9 million (2016)
- Operating income: ▼€19.693 million (2016)
- Net income: ▼€21.112 million (2016)
- Total assets: ▼€267.567 million (2016)
- Total equity: ▲€215.470 million (2016)
- Owner: Government of Cyprus
- Website: cpa.gov.cy

The Cyprus Ports Authority (CPA, Greek: Αρχή Λιμένων Κύπρου) is a semi-autonomous government agency that is responsible for the supervision and oversight of the ports and port facilities of Cyprus. Established by the Cyprus Ports Authority Law of 1973, it is based in Nicosia.

== Ports ==
The ports and oil terminals under the effective control of the CPA are:

- Dekelia Oil Terminal, Dekelia
- Larnaca Oil Terminal, Larnaca
- Larnaca Port, Larnaca (multipurpose)
- Latsi Port, Latsi (leisure)
- New Limassol Port, Limassol (multipurpose)
- Old Limassol Port, Limassol (fishing; leisure)
- Paphos Port, Paphos (passenger; fishing; leisure)
- Vasiliko Oil Terminal, Vasiliko
- Vasiliko Port, Vasiliko (industrial)

The New Limassol Port is the country's principal passenger and cargo port. The ports of Famagusta and Kyrenia and the terminal at Karavostasi lie in Northern Cyprus.

== Lighthouses ==
The lighthouses at Paphos, Cape Greco, Cape Gata and Akamas are under the jurisdiction of the Authority.

== See also ==
- Cyprus Merchant Marine
- Government of Cyprus
- Port authority
- Port operator
- Transport in Cyprus
