= Nicosia New General Hospital =

Coordinates: 35.127669°N 33.377007°E

- Ministry of Health, Republic of Cyprus

Geography
- Location: Nicosia, Nicosia District, Cyprus

Organisation
- Care system: Social Security
- Type: General
- Affiliated university: None

Services
- Emergency department: Yes

History
- Opened: 2006

Links
- Website: www.moh.gov.cy
- Lists: Hospitals in Cyprus

Nicosia New General Hospital is the Nicosia district's main medical center. It opened in 2006, replacing Nicosia Old General Hospital.

The contract for the construction of the New Nicosia General Hospital was signed in 1997. On 14 April 1997, the former President of the Republic of Cyprus, Glafkos Clerides, laid the foundation stone.

The cost for the construction and equipment of the New Nicosia General Hospital was about 120 million Cyprus pounds (205 million euro). On 17 October 2006, the removal from the Old to the New Nicosia General Hospital was completed.

The New Nicosia General Hospital was inaugurated by the former President of the Republic of Cyprus, Tassos Papadopoulos, on 30 March 2007.

The hospital occupies an area of 102000 m^{2}, of which approximately 31000m^{2} are non-hospital premises.
