= Trade unions in Cyprus =

Trade unions in Cyprus include:

- ETYK ETYK (Ενωση Τραπεζικών Υπαλλήλων Κύπρου - Kıbrıs Bankacılar Sendikası - Cyprus Bank Employees Union)
- ΠΕΟ PEO (Παγκύπρια Εργατική Ομοσπονδία - Tüm Kıbrıs İşçi Federasyonu- Pancyprian Labour Federation)
- ΣΕΚ SEK (Συνομοσπονδία Εργαζομένων Κύπρου - Kıbrıs İşçi Konfederasyonu - Cyprus Workers Confederation)
- ΔΕΟΚ DEOK (Δημοκρατική Εργατική Ομοσπονδία Κύπρου - Kıbrıs Demokratik İşçiler Federasyonu- Cyprus Democratic Labour Federation)
- ΠOAS POAS (Παγκύπρια Οργάνωση Ανεξαρτήτων Συντεχνιών - Pancyprian Organization of Independent Trade Unions)
- ΠΑΣΥΔΥ PASYDY (Παγκύπρια Συντεχνία Δημοσίων Υπαλλήλων - Tüm Kıbrıs Kamu Kurumu Çalışanları Federayonu- Pancyprian Public Sector Workers Federation)
- ΠΟΕΔ POED (Παγκύπρια Οργάνωση Ελλήνων Δασκάλων - Tüm Kıbrıs Yunan Öğretmenler Sendikası- Pancyprian Greek Teachers Association)
- ΟΕΛΜΕΚ OELMEK (Οργάνωση Ελλήνων Λειτουργών Μέσης Εκπαίδευσης Κύπρου - Kıbrıs Yunan Orta öğretim Öğretmenleri Sendikası- Cyprus Secondary Education Greek Teachers Association)
- ΟΛΤΕΚ OLTEK (Οργάνωση Λειτουργών Τεχνικής Εκπαίδευσης Κύπρου - Kıbrıs Yunan Mesleki Eğitim Öğretmenleri Sendikası- Cyprus Vocational Education Greek Teachers Association)
