= Welfare in Cyprus =

Cyprus is a high income country with a well established and extensive welfare system. The Social Insurance Scheme ensures access to healthcare, income support, and pensions, with mandatory contributions for all employees and employers. Income support is means tested on the basis of total family income and assets, which often places the burden of care on the family unit before the state provides assistance. There is also an obligation to seek work. The pension system is fairly comprehensive, yet may still leave some in the private sector unsupported.

== Minimum income law ==
In 2014, the Cyprus Guaranteed Minimum Income and Social Benefits Law was passed to replace the previous Public Assistance and Service Law. It covers all EU citizens and also long-term residents with legal status, and its main intention is to shelter those with higher risk of poverty and to guarantee the recipients with basic standard of living.

All EU citizens and Cypriots are applicable to the program if they have lived in Cyprus for more than five years before the application and will continue to reside there. Similar with conservative welfare states, Cyprus’s Minimum Income (MI) Law adopted the principle of subsidiarity, which means that family unit must serve as the first defending line for individuals. For Cyprus’s MI Law, eligibility for help is based on the total needs of a family unit. A family is qualified for benefits as long as its total income cannot satisfy its total need. Additionally, property ownership is also calculated based on family unit. The assumption is that members inside a family must collaborate and help each other. Only when they together as a social unit cannot afford to live well would the state came to help as the last-resort safety net. Moreover, the basic income value for a person that has zero income reported is set €480 per month, which is more than half of the respective poverty threshold. The value is set in an ad hoc basis to adapt to varying levels of national income and inflation.

Benefits of Cyprus’s MI Law are given based on means testing. Potential recipients need to apply and demonstrate that they have certifiable needs, and that they’re really out of means except government support. To truly distribute benefits to those that need them the most, the Cyprus’s MI Law sets an age limit (above 28 years old) to eliminate young people who’re not earning much but are enjoying high standard of living with their parents from the list beneficiaries. It also has an activation strategy aimed to encourage the unemployed to actively seek jobs. Recipients would be required to accept available jobs in their relative fields, and those who’re unemployed voluntarily would be excluded from the program.

== Pension system ==
The Cyprus social security pension system consists of six parts: the General Social Insurance Scheme; the Social Pension Scheme; the Special Allowance to pensioners; the Government Employees Pension Scheme; other Public Sector Employees Pension Schemes; the Voluntary Provident Funds and other similar collective arrangements. Each scheme calculates benefits in different formulations. The General Social Insurance Scheme covers everyone who's gainfully employed in Cyprus with contributory interests. The Government Employees Pension Scheme covers pensions for those in the army and work for the government and is also earning-related. It is notable that while Cyprus pension system do target various social groups, including the self-employed, its employees in private sector still are largely unsheltered. Cyprus pension system also pays specific attention to the elderly, especially those who experienced the Turkish invasion of Cyprus in 1974, many of whom have lost their means of life.

Legal residents in Cyprus are entitled for pension programs as long as they have lived 20 years in Cyprus after the age of 40 and 35 years after the age of 18. Besides, the Agreement on Social Security signed between Canada and Cyprus in 1991 permits that those who have worked in Canada and have contributed to the Canada Pension Plan for a certain period of time might be qualified to enjoy the benefits of Cyprus pension system after verification. Even though the Cyprus pension programs have covered its population comparatively comprehensive, the replacement rate is still pretty low.
