= Medochemie =

Pharmaceutical company

Medochemie Ltd
- Type: Private Company
- Industry: Pharmaceutical
- Founded: 1976
- Headquarters: Limassol, Cyprus
- Area served: Worldwide
- Key people: Andreas Pittas; Chairman & CEO
- Products: Pharmaceuticals, over-the-counter medicines
- Revenue: ▲US$500 million
- Number of employees: ▲1,250 (2013)
- Website: Medochemie.com

Medochemie Ltd is a multinational generics pharmaceutical and consumer healthcare company headquartered in Limassol, Cyprus. Medochemie develops, licenses, manufactures, markets, and distributes branded generic products as well as their own patented brands.

== History ==
Medochemie was established in 1976 by a Cypriot entrepreneur Dr. Andreas Pittas with eight employees and three machines: for tablet making, capsule filling and packaging. Medochemie is a founding member of the European Generic Medicines Association (EGA).

== Operations ==
Medochemie employed 1,250 people in 2009. Medochemie has fifteen manufacturing plants. Nine are in Cyprus, 5 in Vietnam and 1 in the Netherlands. The company maintains 3,800 marketing authorization licenses for 630 different pharmaceutical products, classified in over 10 therapeutic categories. Its global headquarters are at Medochemie House in Limassol's industrial area.
