= Poverty in Cyprus =

Poverty in Cyprus is not well documented, yet is still considered a major problem by the Cypriot government. Due to strong kinship bonds among extended families, poverty in Cyprus primarily affects those outside kinship networks, such as immigrants, divorcees and singles from small families. One study found a strong correlation between increased poverty and small family size. Poverty is also more likely to affect the elderly than the young, as a result of income to pensions raising the dependency levels.

== Statistical indicators and historical trend ==
A report from the late 1990s (based on the Family Expenditure Survey of 1996–97) found that the Gini coefficient (which indicates income distribution) for Cyprus was about 0.36, and that the most vulnerable groups included the chronically ill, retirees, poorly educated people, and housewives (widows).

Poverty and social exclusion in Cyprus have changed significantly following Cyprus' entry into the European Union in 2004. According to Eurostat, people "at risk of poverty" or social exclusion in Cyprus accounted for approximately 23–27%, roughly aligned with the EU average of about 23–26% in the measured period (2004–2012). In 2010, 16% of the population were part of households with income below €10,189 per adult capita, corresponding to 60% of the median income per adult capita. People living in severe material deprivation comprised about 10% of the population.

Living condition and deprivation indicators are set measurements of poverty. Objectively, basic commodities of material hardship, housing standards, and financial misfortune can hurt a family. Other symptoms of the economy, standards of living, or life satisfaction, play a role in how the household income is used. As a result of the toll that these specific indicators take on a family, that renders "social exclusion" relevant as well, by restricting the family's ability to develop. The EU formed the Social Protection Committee for this purpose for safeguarding inclusion, as shown in dataset Euro-25.

A 2013 study by Koutsampelas and Polycarpou noted that "Poverty [in Cyprus], according to all indices, falls between 2009 and 2012. However, it increases considerably in 2013 (13.1%–32.9%) and thereafter it stabilizes at rather high levels". Following the 2012–13 Cypriot financial crisis, predictions were made that poverty in Cyprus will significantly worsen, but as of 2014 no conclusive evidence has supported this. The number of people living in severe material deprivation rose to 15%, though the at-risk rate actually dropped from 15.9% in 2008 to 14.7% in 2012.

Unemployment in Cyprus rose from 3.7% in 2008 to 15.9% in 2013, and youth unemployment reached a record 32% that year. The long-term unemployment rate rose more than sevenfold from 0.5% in 2008 to 3.6% in 2012.

== Reasons for poverty ==
One of the cited reasons for poverty in Cyprus is a lack of education, though educational attainment in Cyprus has been rising to surpass the EU average, and therefore the educational attainment issue should become less relevant. Another factor, affecting the elderly, were inadequate pensions for private sector retirees; a 1980 pension reform has produced an as-yet immature system, which is expected to generate higher pension payments in years to come. On the other hand, child poverty in Cyprus has been relatively low.

== Government attitude ==
With a boost in the economy, following recession in 2003, Cyprus is applying time to lowering the public's debt in the GDP, from 70.3% in 2004 to under 60% by 2007.

The level of poverty can be related to the topic of income and living conditions, for that can measure the standing of a household or an individual to point out the inequalities that underlie a society. Although there are no statistics showing how many people are below the poverty line, 42.3% of the population are dependent on someone, whether youth or elderly. There are also 28.9% “at risk of poverty” as of 2015 that continues to be affected with the need for money grows. The highest at risk of poverty are the elderly, for the difference in income to pensions is greatly exaggerated, that they are forced to be dependent on their working family.

Cyprus illustrates a growing need for welfare every year because unemployment rates continue to increase, i.e. 2013 with 14.8% to 16% in 2014. On 10 July 2014, the Cypriot government established the guaranteed minimum income through the approval of House of Representatives, which allows a monthly allowance as a helping hand. This changed the prior Public Assistance that spread resources too thin, and to those that were no longer in need of the resources provided. Although the GMI would be accessible "for all citizens", as said by President Nicos Anastasiades, it would be received through a means-test. These terms of a fixed minimum income aided in the issue of unemployment, and has created a downward trend from 15% to 13%, following suit across the EU.
