= Allbiz =

E-commerce marketplace

- Type: Private
- Industry: International Center of E-commerce
- Headquarters: Cyprus (EU zone)
- Number of employees: 564 (March 2014)
- Website: www.all.biz

Allbiz is an online business-to-business (B2B) and business-to-consumer (B2C) marketplace for e-commerce. The company's key products are package services for business online promotion in the territory of interest (a kind of business online promotion). The company has its headquarters in Cyprus, EU-zone. Its other 24 representative offices are located in 13 countries: Ukraine, Kazakhstan, Moldova, Azerbaijan, Uzbekistan, Georgia, Poland, Romania, Greece, Egypt, India, and China. Allbiz was founded in 1999 as an informational platform to help businesses find partners and buyers online. [1]

Today, the project joins the markets of 90 countries and features information about more than 20 million products and services from 1.3 million companies. According to Google Analytics, its daily visitors’numbert reaches 700,000 from 240 countries and regions all over the world. It supports 26 languages, including English, German, Spanish, French, Portuguese, Russian, Ukrainian, Polish, Romanian, Hungarian, Bulgarian, Dutch, Chinese, Czech, Turkish, Italian, Arabic, Persian, Japanese, Korean, Vietnamese, Greek, Hebrew, Norwegian, Finnish, and Swedish. Any product or service listed in the directory is automatically displayed in all supported languages.

In 2011, Allbiz was ranked by Google's "Top 1,000 Most Visited Sites on the Web" rating at 415th place among the most visited web sites in the world. [2]

== History ==
- 1999: The online catalog laid the foundation for the emergence of Allbiz.
- 2006: The catalog evolves into an international resource, ALL-BIZ.INFO, containing detailed information about the goods and services of companies from Russia, Ukraine, Moldova, Kazakhstan, and Belarus.
- 2010: The company attracts investments; [1 changes its name to Allbiz and moves to the domain www.all.biz. Since this time, the company has started to operate at a global level.
- 1999: The online catalog laid the foundation for the emergence of Allbiz.
- 2006: The catalog evolves into an international resource, ALL-BIZ.INFO, containing detailed information about the goods and services of companies from Russia, Ukraine, Moldova, Kazakhstan, and Belarus.
- 2010: The company attracts investments; [1 changes its name to Allbiz and moves to the domain www.all.biz. Since this time, the company has started to operate at a global level..
