= Pevex Management =

- Company type: Private company
- Industry: Accountants & tax advisors
- Founded: 2008
- Headquarters: Cyprus
- Area served: Worldwide
- Products: accountancy services, corporate tax advice
- Website: www.pevex.com.cy

Pevex Management is an international corporate services company with its headquarters in Cyprus. The company was founded in 2008 although its principals have long experience in this field. It has since grown and now has offices/affiliates in New York City, Gibraltar, France, Hong Kong and Singapore. Pevex offers accountancy services, together with corporate tax and structuring advice.
