= Universal Life (Cyprus) =

- Industry: Insurance
- Founded: 1970
- Headquarters: Nicosia, Cyprus
- Area served: Cyprus, Greece
- Revenue: CYP £59,799,000
- Website: Universal Life

Universal Life was the first local insurance company created in Cyprus. Today, it is the largest insurance company on the island with a market share in excess of 28%. 2005 results report assets of CYP £457,383,000.

Incorporated as a private company by prominent Cypriot businessmen in 1970, Universal Life was the first insurance company to be founded in Cyprus after the enactment of the local insurance legislation. Universal Life was instrumental in the development of the life insurance industry in Cyprus through the introduction of new insurance concepts and the advancement of insurance values amongst Cypriots. Today, Universal Life is one of the most prominent life insurance companies of the island and the leading company in the local accident and health sector.

The Company’s products are distributed through a network of professional and highly trained full-time insurance agents.

Furthermore, Universal Life is a socially responsible company that has a policy to give back to society by being an active contributor in areas that have a positive impact on the quality of life of all Cypriots thus giving a true meaning to its motto “because life is precious”.
