= Imperio Properties =

Property development and management firm based in Cyprus

- Company type: Private
- Industry: Residential property, commercial property
- Founded: October 10, 2003
- Headquarters: Limassol, Cyprus
- Key people: Yiannis Misirlis (Chairman); Nicholas Ayiomamitis (CEO)
- Products: Real estate
- Website: www.imperioproperties.com

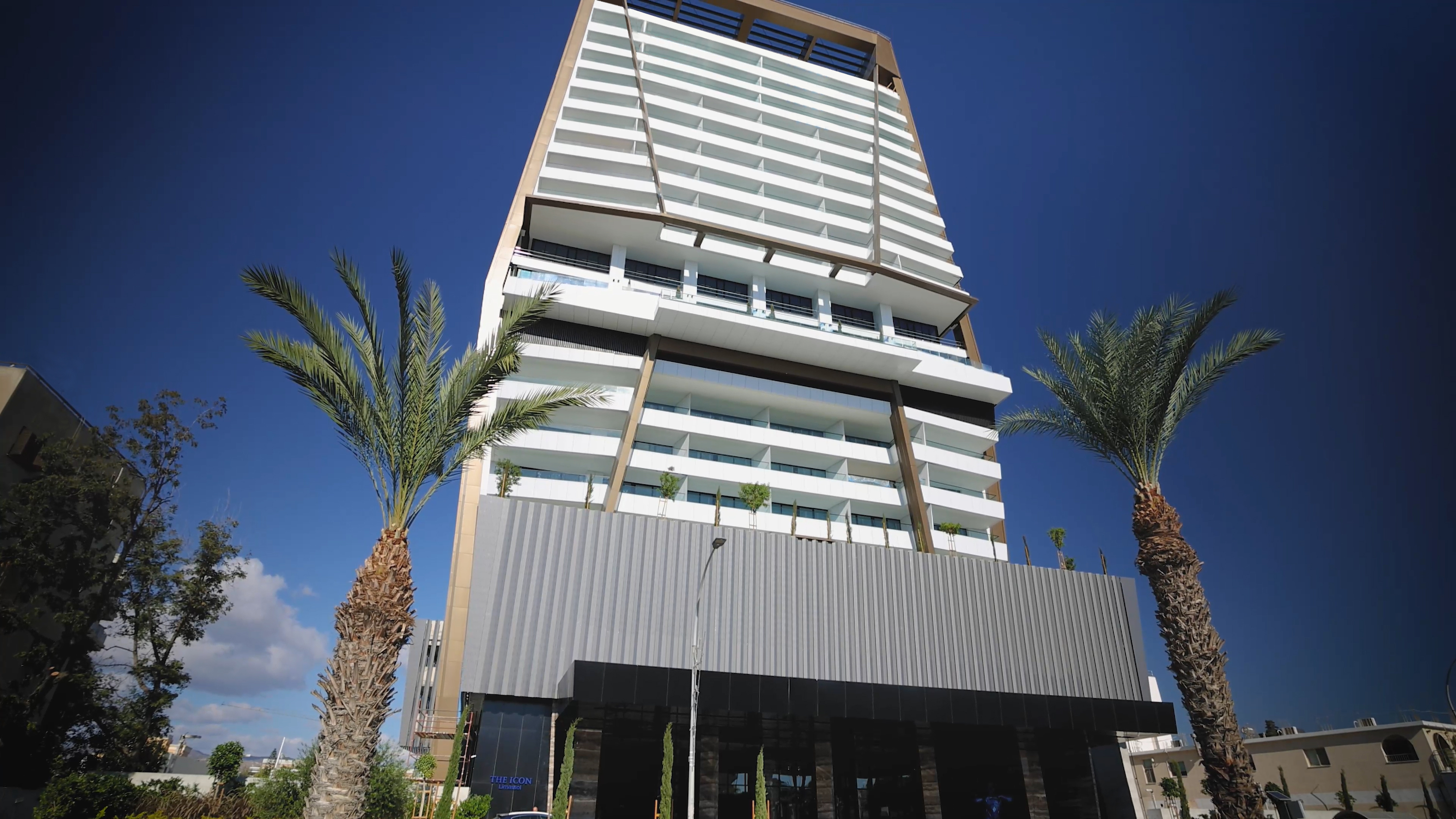
The Icon Limassol

Imperio Properties is a property development and management firm, based in Cyprus, since 2003. Imperio completed fifty projects, and its biggest project is The Icon tower, which has been completed in 2021.

== History ==
Imperio Group's chairman, Yiannis Misirlis and director at Imperio Properties, Antonis Misirlis, are brothers. Yiannis is married to Ino Anastasiades, daughter of Nicos Anastasiades, the Former President of Cyprus.

Yiannis Misirlis is the founder and the chairman at Imperio Group. Yiannis was educated in London and Madrid, and holds a BSc in Civil Engineering, an MSc in Information Technology, and an International MBA. He is also a current member of Cyprus Scientific and Technical Chamber (ETEK). Yiannis is also the chairman of the Board of the Land and Building Developers Association of Cyprus (LBDA). Yiannis has been a regular contributor to OPPLive (one of Europe's largest property fairs) covering issues related to the Cyprus property market. He is also a regular contributor to the business columns of Phileleftheros, Politis and Simerini (local newspapers) analysing investment trends related to the property market, as well as trends related to interior design and property management and has, in the past, contributed to columns in the Financial Times and the Hong Kong Times. In 2010, Yiannis was voted “Businessman of the Year” by Politis newspaper.

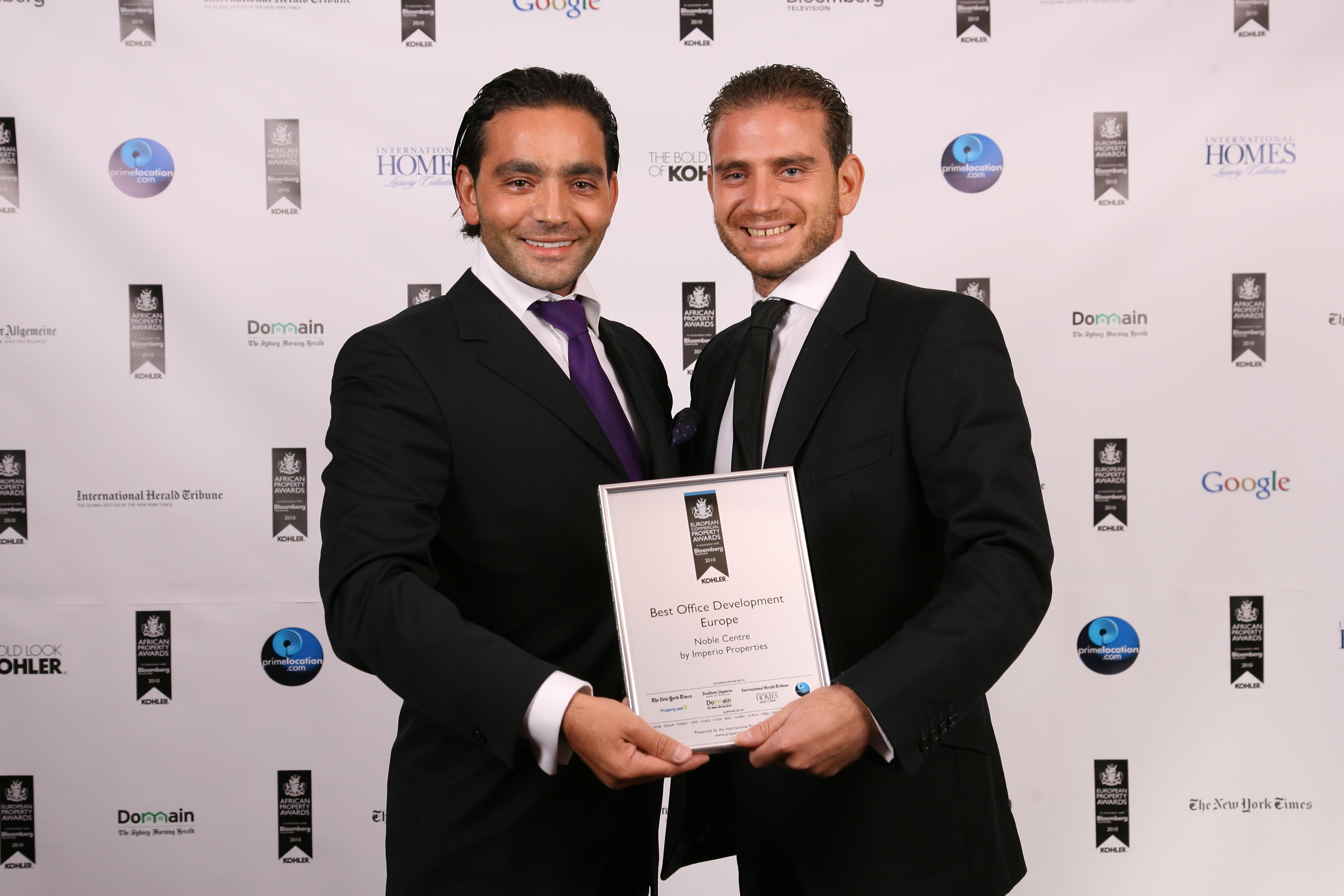
Best Office Development - Noble Centre EU 2010

== The Icon ==
The Icon is a tower in Limassol, Cyprus on the Mediterranean coastline. It is located at the tourist area of Yermasogeia. It contains 60 residences. The Icon is one of the tallest building in Cyprus. At the entrance of the building there is a sculpture of the Wild Kong series by the French artist Richard Orlinski.

== Sunset Gardens ==
Sunset Gardens is the first gated residential community in Limassol. The development of the project started at 2021 and includes more than 300 apartments. The project has been called one of the most sustainable residential complexes in Cyprus as it includes more than 40,000 trees and plants, and uses renewable sources of energy for most of its operational needs.

== Awards ==
One of the firm's development was awarded Best Apartment in Cyprus for 2009, by the International Property Awards. In November 2010 two of its developments, Noble Centre and Buena Vista Residences, received an award for being the best properties in Europe in the categories Best Office Development and Best Interior Design respectively.
