= METRO Foods Trading =

Metro Supermarkets
- Industry: Retail
- Founded: January 1, 1982; 44 years ago (as Metro); Larnaca, Cyprus.
- Headquarters: Larnaca, Cyprus.
- Number of locations: 6 (2023)
- Website: http://www.metro.com.cy

METRO is one of the leading supermarket chains in Cyprus. It currently operates with 3 stores in Nicosia and 1 store in Larnaca, 2 in Limassol and one in Paralimni.

In October 1982, METRO Foods Trading Ltd was established with its first hypermarket in Larnaca.
