= Lois Builders =

European construction company

LOIS Builders Ltd
- Industry: Construction Company
- Founded: 1977
- Headquarters: Cyprus
- Area served: Cyprus, Saudi Arabia
- Website: http://www.loisbuilders.com

LOIS Builders Ltd is a Cyprus based construction company, founded in 1977 by Sotos Lois. The company is currently managing projects in all sectors of commerce, industry and services, in both private as well as public sectors. It has completed over 200 projects. In recent years, the company has commenced operations in Saudi Arabia.

== Notable completed projects ==
The core business of the company is the undertaking of building works contracts (including restorations) both from the public and private sectors. Such projects include medical, financial and educational institutions, tourist and leisure resorts, commercial centres, office buildings and residential projects.

- Cyprus Ministry of Finance
- Tower 25, a mixed use development designed by the world renowned architect Jean Nouvel
- Cyprus Olympic Committee offices and park
- New Municipal Town Hall of Nicosia
- New Limassol Port Passenger Terminal
- Forum Private School premises and grounds
- New AUDI Terminal, showroom and garage
- Hippocrateon Private Hospital
- Mall of Engomi
- Most of the Private Tertiary Education Institutions

In addition, LOIS Builders in collaboration with its joint venture partner Phoenix Constructions, also undertakes the construction of large scale technical works such as infrastructure and road projects after successful bidding in government tenders. Among the most recent completed projects was the building of a double lane road connecting Paralimni and Derineia, a project worth €12.5 million.

== International Expansion ==
LOIS Builders, through its subsidiary company LOIS Builders KSA, was awarded its first contract in Saudi Arabia in November 2011. Since then, the company has set up a full scale operation with Head Offices in the capital city of Riyadh. LOIS Builders first project in KSA involved the construction of a Military Airbase Facility in the outskirts of the capital Riyadh worth the equivalent of approximately $50m USD for the Aviation of the Saudi Arabia National Guard (SANG). The development included a total number of 65 buildings together with all corresponding infrastructure, covering an area of 65,000 m^{2}. The project was completed and delivered in April 2014.
