= Paphos General Hospital =

Coordinates: 34.7889°N 32.4460°E

- Ministry of Health, Republic of Cyprus

Geography
- Location: Paphos, Paphos District, Cyprus

Organisation
- Care system: Social Security
- Type: General
- Affiliated university: None

Services
- Emergency department: Yes
- Beds: ~500

History
- Opened: 1992

Links
- Website: http://www.moh.gov.cy/moh/moh.nsf/index_en/index_en?OpenDocument
- Lists: Hospitals in Cyprus

Paphos General Hospital is the Paphos district's main medical centre. With four stories and 25,000 square metres (270,000 sq ft) this pyramid shaped hospital is designed to offer to patients first aid to MRI Scans. It was opened in 1992 and the hospital currently operates with all the necessary departments. Within there is also a 200-seat auditorium, and there is a heliport right next to the emergency department.
