= Pancyprian Organization of Independent Trade Unions =

Trade union centre in Cyprus

The Pancyprian Organization of Independent Trade Unions (Greek: Παγκύπρια Οργάνωση Ανεξαρτήτων Συντεχνιών, abbreviated 'Π.Ο.Α.Σ', POAS) was a trade union centre in Cyprus. PAOS was founded in 1956, by unions that wanted to position themselves as independent from political parties. The organization reached its peak of influence in the late 1950s. Starting from the early 1960s the organization entered a prolonged period of decline. By 1990, the organization had only 500 members. POAS was affiliated to the World Confederation of Labour.
