= Tsokkos =

Hotel chain

A. Tsokkos Hotels
- Company type: Hospitality
- Industry: Tourism industry
- Founded: 1979: A. Tsokkos Hotels founded
- Headquarters: Ayia Napa, Cyprus
- Key people: Andreas Tsokkos, Anastasia Tsokkou
- Products: Tsokkos Hotels
- Number of employees: 1,200 (2007)
- Website: www.tsokkos.com

Tsokkos Hotels (CY: TSH) is a hotel chain owned by the Tsokkos family. The business was founded in 1979 by the Andreas Tsokkos. The company is Cyprus's largest hotel chain with over 8,000 rooms in 30 hotels in Cyprus and Egypt. It has 1,200 employees and serves 1.2 million clients per year. There are Tsokkos Hotels in Cyprus and Egypt.

== Hotels and resorts ==
=== Cyprus ===
Protaras

- Tsokkos Constantinos The Great Beach Hotel
- Tsokkos Vrissiana Beach Hotel
- Tsokkos Iliada Beach Hotel
- Tsokkos Odessa Hotel
- Tsokkos Beach Hotel
- Tsokkos Anastasia Hotel
- Tsokkos Gardens Hotel
- Tsokkos Polycarpia Hotel
- Tsokkos Silver Sands Beach Hotel
- Tsokkos Antigoni Hotel
- Tsokkos Gardens Hotel Apts A'
- Tsokkos Sun Gardens Hotel Apts A'
- Tsokkos Vryssi Hotel Apts A'
- Tsokkos Marlita Beach Hotel Apts A'
- Tsokkos Ausonia Hotel Apts A'
- Tsokkos Tropical Dreams Hotel Apts A'
- Tsokkos Pambero Hotel Apts A'
- Tsokkos Anastasia Beach Hotel Apts A'

Ayia Napa

- Tsokkos Dome Beach Hotel
- Tsokkos Anmaria Beach Hotel
- Tsokkos Napa Hotel
- Tsokkos Paradise Village
- Tsokkos Evabelle Napa Hotel Apts A'
- Tsokkos Holiday Hotel Apts A'
- Tsokkos Holiday Hotel Apts B'
- Tsokkos Maria Apts
- Crysomare Beach Hotel

Paphos

- Tsokkos Ascos Coral Beach Hotel
- Tsokkos King Evelthon

=== Egypt ===
Sharm el-Sheikh

- Tsokkos Cleopatra Hotel (closed)
