= Cyprus International Institute for Environmental and Public Health =

- Formation: 2004
- Type: Research Institute
- Location: Limassol, Cyprus
- Affiliations: Harvard School of Public Health

The Cyprus International Institute for Environmental and Public Health was set up with the collaboration of Harvard School of Public Health (HSPH) and the government of Cyprus.

It deals with key environmental issues in Cyprus and the Mediterranean region and its training entities are:

1. The Cyprus International Institute (CII) for the Environment and Public Health

2. The HSPH-Cyprus Program (HCP) in Boston.
