= Cyprus Merchant Marine =

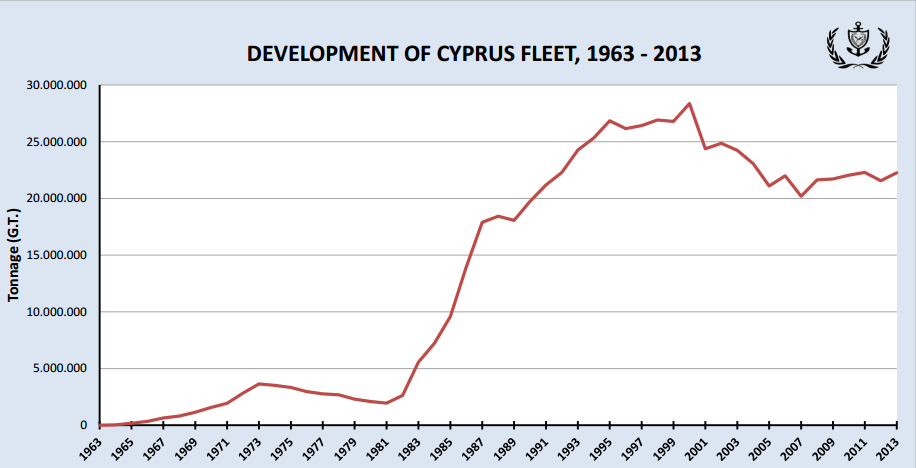
Historical Development of Cyprus Merchant Fleet

The Cyprus Maritime flag

The history of shipping in Cyprus traces back hundreds of years. Its geographical position at the crossroads of Europe, Asia and Africa as well as its proximity to the Suez Canal has historically favoured merchant shipping as an important industry for this European island state. As of 2005 Cyprus holds the 9th largest (by DWT) merchant navy in the world and the 3rd largest in the European Union.

== Ancient history ==
Merchant shipping has long been of great importance to the island, with its roots stretching well back into antiquity. Examples of shipwrecks discovered off the island's coast (e.g. the Kyrenia ship) plus evidence of ancient ports (e.g. Amathus) give proof to the fact that Cyprus was a major seafaring player in antiquity and located along important trade routes.

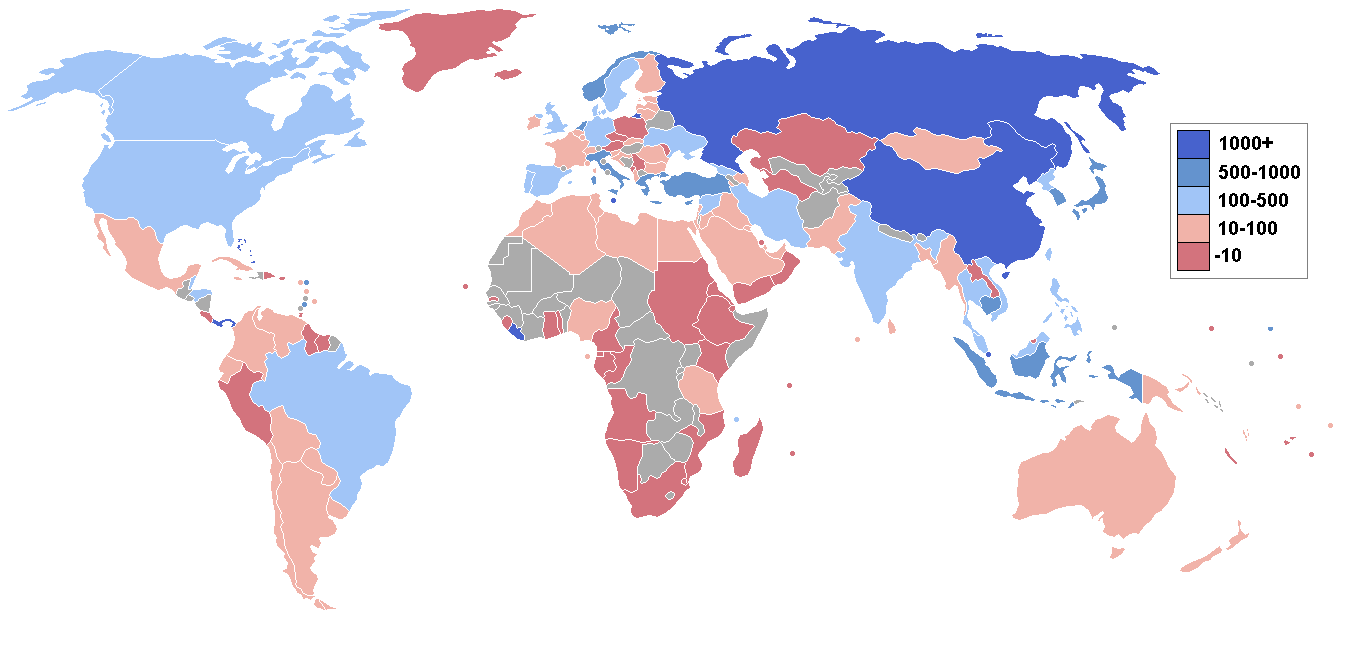
2005 Registration of Merchant Ships.

== Modern history ==
Merchant shipping has been actively developed by successive governments since the independence of Cyprus from British rule in 1960 and has since experienced sustained growth. The first shipping hub was created in the port of Famagusta, but since the Turkish invasion of 1974 the port has been occupied and is currently declared illegal. Most business are now transferred to Limassol Port and to a lesser extent Larnaca Port. Cyprus has traditionally been a popular shipping centre and home to some of the leading names of the global shipping industry. Among the ship management companies established and operating, 87% are controlled by EU interests. These companies employ almost 40,000 seafarers out of whom 5,000 are EU nationals. According to the latest governmental estimates, the total fleet managed from Cyprus represents 20% of the world third–party ship management market (out of 10,000 ships in the world shipmanagement market under a wide approach).

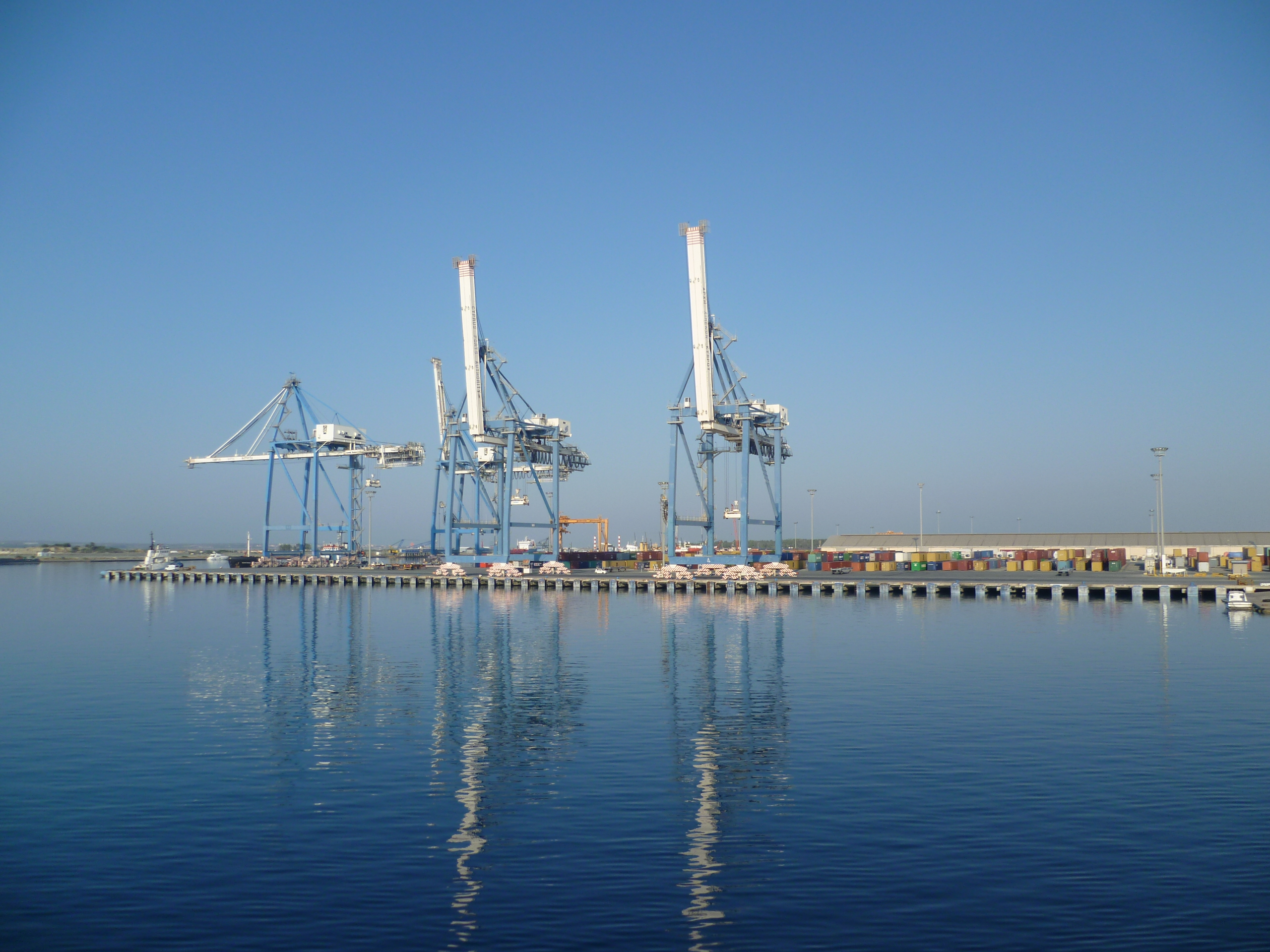
Cranes in Limassol Harbour.

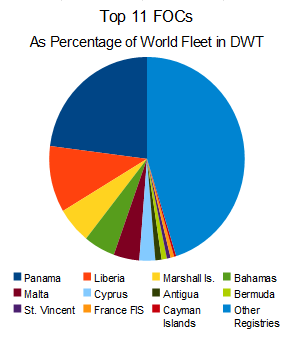
Top 11 flags of convenience account for almost 55% of the entire world fleet.

=== EU Tonnage Tax Scheme ===
The new tonnage tax scheme for Cyprus was approved by the European Commission on 24 March 2010, as compatible with the requirements of the EU Acquis communautaire, in accordance with the relevant guidelines on State Aid to Maritime Transport. This simplified tonnage tax system is approved for the first time for an EU Member State, a state with an open registry. The said scheme was approved for a ten years period, which may be extended for a further period of ten years. The provisions of the Law are applicable for the fiscal year 2010, starting on the 1st January 2010 and will be valid until December 2019.

=== Department of Merchant Shipping ===
The Department of Merchant Shipping (DMS) was established and started functioning as a distinct entity in the Ministry of Communications and Works, in 1977. The service existed, however since 1963 and functioned under the Department of Ports. The Cyprus registry ranks tenth among international fleets and third within the European Union, with a merchant fleet exceeding 22 million gross tons. The department is responsible for the development of maritime activities which include:

- Ship registration,
- Administration and enforcement of the Merchant Shipping Laws
- Control of ships and enforcement of international conventions ratified by the Government of Cyprus
- Marine conservation
- Vessel traffic monitoring in the sea around Cyprus and information system implementation
- Monitoring the conditions of living and work on board Cyprus Ships
- Registration, training and certification of seafarers
- Control of Coastal passenger vessels and small craft
- Investigation of marine accidents
- Continuous updating of the merchant shipping legislation and its harmonization with that of the European Union
- Coordination of the EU Integrated Maritime Policy
- Administration of the State Aid Scheme for Maritime Transport and the Tonnage Tax System
- Promotion of Cyprus as an International Registry and a base for international maritime operations

=== Open Registry Regime ===
Cyprus has the only EU-approved “Open Registry” regime with a wide and legally endorsed Tonnage Tax System (TTS), which was introduced with the Merchant Shipping Law in 2010 and covers the three main “maritime transport” activities:

- Ship owning
- Ship management (crew and technical management)
- Chartering

=== Maritime Centre ===
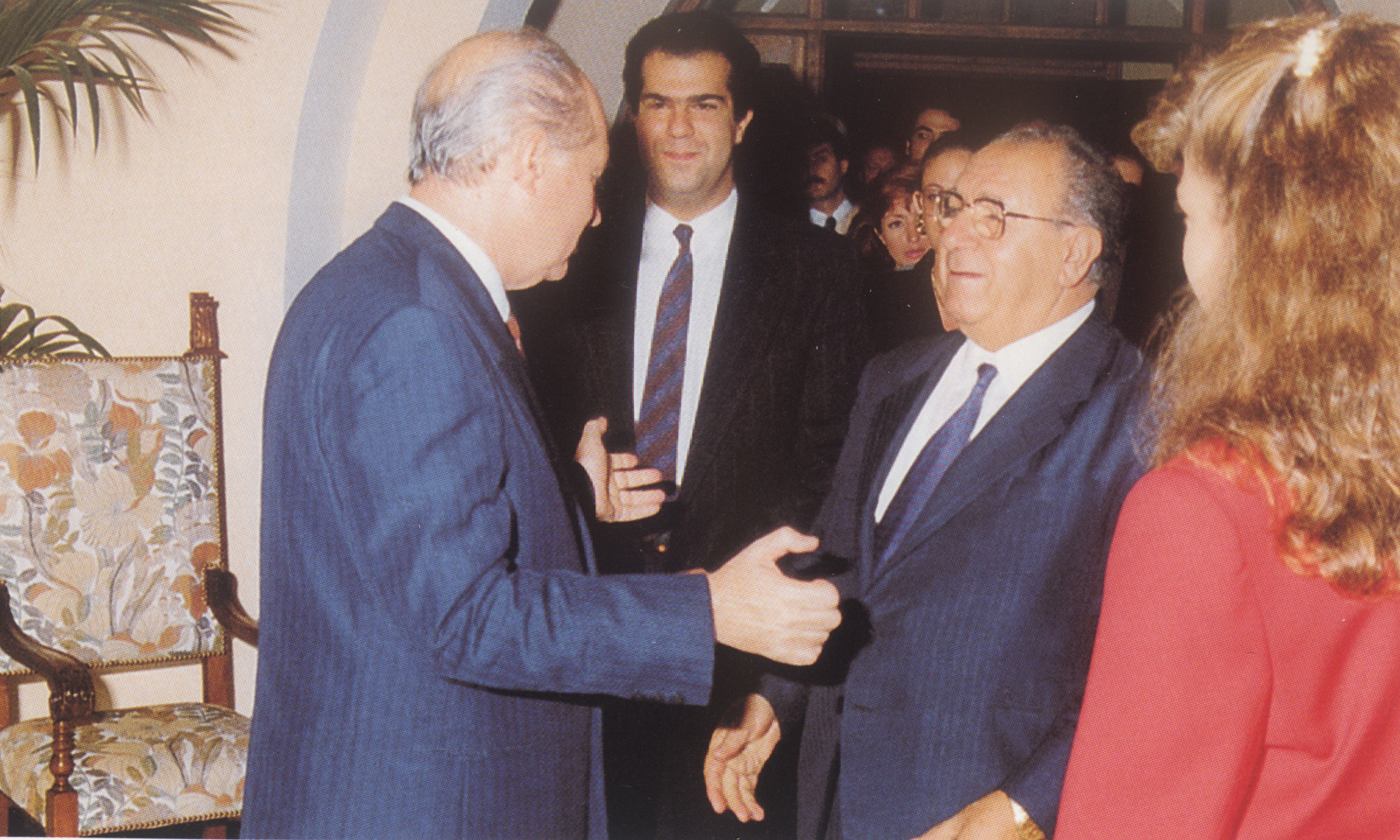
Stelios Haji-Ioannou visiting the Cyprus Maritime Center in 1989

The BSM Maritime Training Centre was founded in 1983 and is IMO approved operating under the auspices of the Cyprus Administration. Individual courses are separately recognized by individual leading flag state authorities, where required. The Centre provides training for Ratings, Junior Officers, Senior Officers, employed on Cyprus and foreign flag ships. Attendees who pass the exams are awarded with certificates issued by the Cyprus Department of Merchant Shipping. All courses comply with STCW 1978 and the amendments of the 1995 Convention. In 1998, the school won the Lloyd's List Youth & Training Award for its outstanding and consistent contribution to maritime training.

=== Geopolitics ===
The states's accession to the European Union, in 2004, further boosted the reputation and overall image of the Cyprus flag and the infrastructure of Cyprus’ shipping in general. Settlement of the Cyprus dispute would boost the commercial fleet to new levels, according to, Cyprus Shipping Chamber Director General and European Community Shipowners' Associations Chairman, Thomas Kazakos. Under the recent geopolitical developments the government is putting into effect recommendations of a study to help it reposition. The Cyprus Shipping Chamber director general says the five-point action plan is designed to boost the island even further against other maritime hubs and open ship registries.

== Economic Contribution ==
Shipping and ship management makes up approximately 2% of the GDP with an overall contribution in of CYP£170 million (1999). 3,500 people are employed in the industry, representing 2% of the total gainfully employed population. The total revenue of Cyprus Maritime Administration for the year 2003 was around CYP£5.3 million which mainly consists of tonnage tax from ship owning and ship management companies, registration fees and issue of shipping documents.
