= The American Heart Institute =

- American Medical Center

Geography
- Location: Strovolos, Nicosia, Cyprus, Europe
- Coordinates: 35.121831°N 33.341287°E

Organisation
- Type: Private Hospital
- Affiliated university: Cyprus Paediatric Neurology Institute (CPNI

Services
- Standards: ISO 9000, TUV Germany
- Beds: 50

History
- Opened: 1999

Links
- Website: www.ahi.com.cy

The American Heart Institute (AHI) is the first private hospital to provide non-invasive and invasive cardiology interventions and the entire spectrum of adult Cardiothoracic surgery in Cyprus. In March 2011 The American Heart Institute started its operations in its new premises and became a department of the American Medical Center whilst new specialties joined the center.

== Landmarks ==
- In 2001 The American Heart Institute establishes and maintains an agreement with the Ministry of Health in Cyprus for interventional cardiology and cardiothoracic surgery procedures for accepting and treating patients.
- In 2004 the American Heart Institute was awarded with the ISO 9001:2000 certificate for initiating and maintaining quality management systems for the admission, treatment and discharge of patients by TUV Germany. It has since successfully maintained certification through yearly audits.
- The American Heart Institute was voted the company of the year with the best service award in Cyprus for 2004 through a public survey organized by Dias Group, IMH Ltd consulting and Cyprus College.
- In 2007 Forbes included AHI as one of the 10 hospitals worth the trip.
- In 2008 CNN World Report also dedicated a short documentary for the innovative radial catheterization procedure that is performed in the Cath Lab.
- The American Heart Institute was awarded the "Green Building Award 2011" from the European Commission for the year 2011.

== EACS & PubMed ==
The AHI keeps detailed data for all results that submit annually to the European Association of Cardiothoracic Surgery (EACS) database. Patient outcomes are monitored using American Association for Thoracic Surgery (AATS) approved software (Axis-Dendrite PATS). The center has performed a series of several high-risk cases with severe left ventricular dysfunction achieving exceptional results. Current outcomes compare favorably with the data published by the STS and the European Association of Cardiothoracic Surgery (EACS). American Heart Institute physicians publish all research results and data at PubMed Central.

== Founders ==
In February 1998 Marinos C. Soteriou (University of Cologne & Vanderbilt University) along with Christos Christou (Fairleigh Dickinson University, Seton Hall University & St. George's University) had an idea to return to Cyprus and start offering comprehensive care in the diagnosis and treatment of cardiac diseases. With the support of an international health-care team, they founded the American Heart Institute in Nicosia and began work in July 1999. The presence of the American Medical Center in the Mediterranean contributes substantially in raising the standards of care in cardiology and cardiac surgery in the area.
