= Moufflon Publications =

Independent press based in Nicosia, Cyprus

Moufflon Publications is an independent press based in Nicosia, Cyprus founded in 1967 by Jirayr Keshishian, and named after the Cyprus Moufflon, an endangered goat species. It is a specialist publisher producing high-quality titles covering a range of subjects with connections to Cyprus and the Eastern Mediterranean.
