= Telepassport Telecommunications =

Telecommunication operator in Cyprus offering all fixed telephone services

In January 2004, Telepassport Telecommunications (Cyprus) Ltd became the first company to be granted a special license to offer fixed telephone services in Cyprus.

Established in April 2002, it is a private telecommunication operator offering all fixed telephone services. With the partial deregulation of the Telecommunication market in Cyprus and having secured the relevant license from the office of the Commissioner of Electronic Communications & Postal Regulation (OCECPR) the company commenced providing fixed telephone services to the Cyprus public via a technologically advanced telecommunications network.

== MyNet ==
MyNet is the name given to the internet packages of the company.
