= Port of Limassol =

Largest port in Cyprus

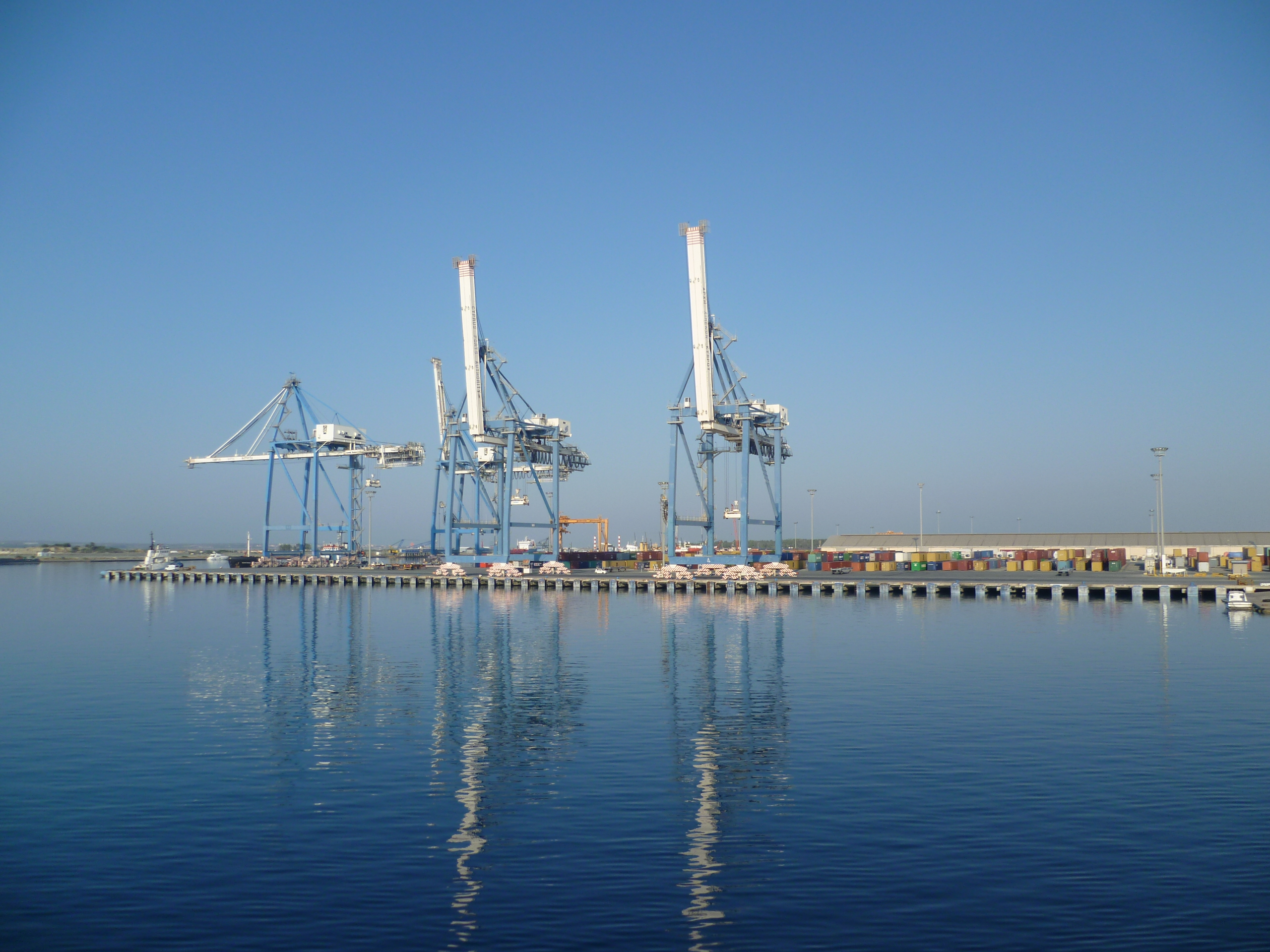
- Cranes in the New Port
- Interactive map of Port of Limassol

Location
- Country: Cyprus
- Location: Limassol
- Coordinates: 34°39′00″N 33°01′00″E
- UN/LOCODE: CYLMS

Details
- Opened: 1974
- Owned by: P&O Maritime DP World Limassol Ltd. Eurogate Container Terminal Limassol

The Port of Limassol (Greek: Λιμάνι Λεμεσού, romanized: Limáni Lemesoú), also known as the Limassol New Port, is the largest port in Cyprus, located in the city of Limassol.

== Location ==
The port is located in the Eastern Mediterranean and is considered one of the busiest ports in the Mediterranean transit trade.

== Importance ==
Limassol's New Port is now the principal seaport of the island. This was largely a result of the Turkish invasion of Cyprus in 1974 leaving the Port of Famagusta within occupied territory and inaccessible. Cyprus is an established player in the shipping industry. The city of Limassol is a centre for numerous global shipping companies. Most of the island’s cargo (importation and exportation) is also handled in this port. In the year 2000, 3,589,000 tonnes of cargo were handled whilst there were roughly 1 million passenger arrival and departures (>90% of total traffic). Over 50 international cruise liners include Cyprus in their Mediterranean Sea routes resulting in much of the passenger traffic.

== Operations ==
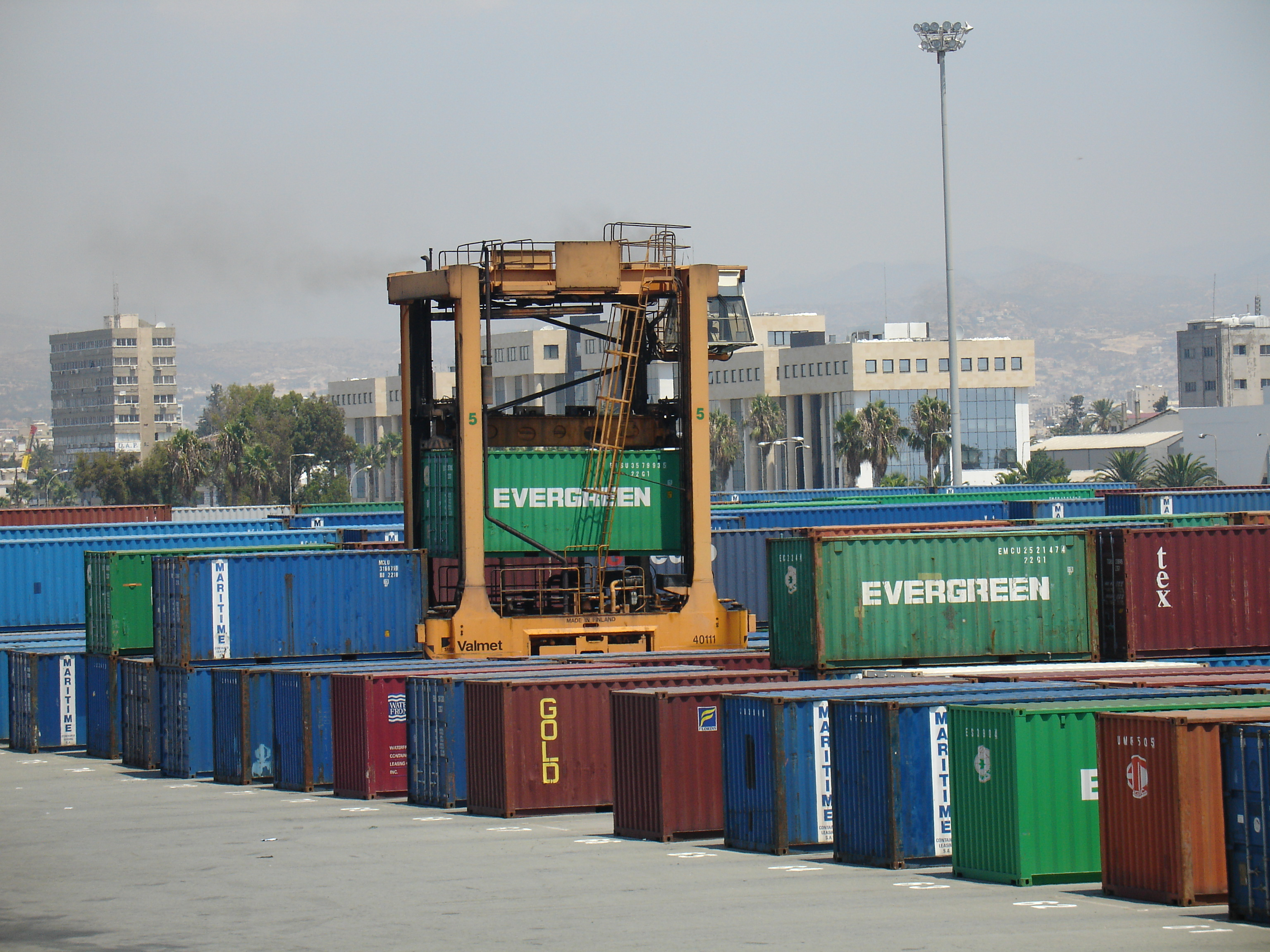
Container handling in the New Port

The port is capable of handling vessels up to 820 ft (250 m) size for berthing in 45 ft (14 m) of water. It is entered through an approach channel which is 49 ft (15 m) deep and 492 ft (150 m) wide between the ends of two breakwaters. In 2016 the port has been privatized to a consortium led by Eurogate International for the container terminal, while DP World will be the operator for multipurpose passenger terminal.

== Humanitarian Hub ==
The port has served numerous times as an evacuation point for refugees fleeing from conflict in the Middle East with most recently hundreds of thousands of EU and other citizens were evacuated from Lebanon.

== Limassol Old Port-Limassol Marina ==
=== Old Port ===
Limassol Old Port used to be the main port of Limassol, between its construction (in its current form) in 1956 up until the delivery of the Limassol New Port in 1973. Its original foundations were laid during the British Cyprus in the late 19th century. Up to and including 1974, the British RAF 1153 Marine Craft Unit (MCU) was stationed in the western part of the harbor. It now serves as a leisure, fishing boat and coast guard shelter.

=== Limassol Marina ===
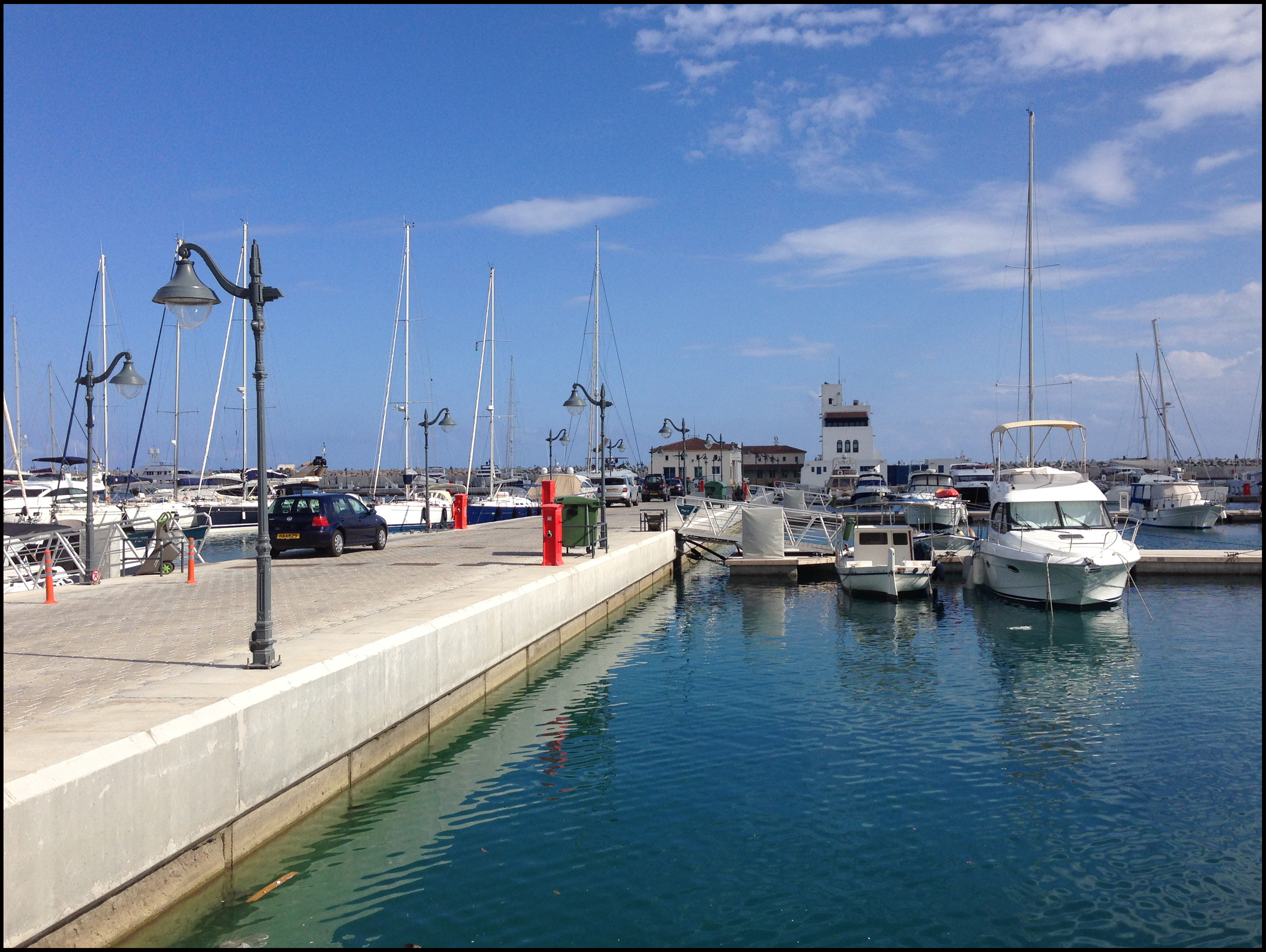
Limassol Marina

The Limassol Marina was built adjacent to the Old Port. It covers an area of 40,000 square metres (430,000 sq ft), and is now a leisure centre with many restaurants, taverns and shops. The Limassol Marina is located right next to the Limassol Molos promenade, and both developments have given Limassol its title as a Coastal City back.

Following an architectural competition, plans have been drawn up to revamp the area and transform it into a more functional leisure center. For that reason the Old Port had been officially closed and the project commenced after some delays under the name Limassol Marina in 2010.

== See also ==
- Cyprus Merchant Marine
- Cyprus Ports Authority
