= Mudd =

Mudd is a surname. Notable people with the surname include:

- Ben Mudd, American politician
- Daniel Mudd (born 1956), American CEO, son of Roger Mudd
- David Mudd (1933–2020), English politician
- Harvey Seeley Mudd (1888–1955), American mining engineer, namesake of Harvey Mudd College
- Henry T. Mudd (1913–1990), American businessman, son of Harvey
- Howard Mudd (1942–2020), American football player and coach
- Jane Mudd (born 1968), Welsh politician
- Jodie Mudd (born 1960), American golfer
- Richard Mudd (1901–2002), grandson of Samuel
- Robert H. Mudd (1875–1904), American football player and coach
- Roger Mudd (1928–2021), American television journalist
- Samuel Mudd (1833–1883), American physician who set John Wilkes Booth's broken leg
- Seeley G. Mudd (1895–1968), California physician
- Seeley W. Mudd (1861–1926), American mining engineer, father of Harvey and Seeley G.
- Stuart Mudd (1893–1975), American physician and microbiologist
- William Mudd (1830–1879), British lichenologist

== Fictional characters ==
- Harry Mudd, who appears in Star Trek: The Original Series and Star Trek: The Animated Series
- Lt. Mudd, in Joseph Heller's novel Catch-22
- Millicent Mudd, in the webcomic Ozy and Millie

== See also ==
- Mudd Club
- Harvey Mudd College
- Puddle of Mudd, American band
- "Mr. Mudd and Mr. Gold", a song by Townes Van Zandt
- Mud (disambiguation)
