= Mining industry of Cyprus =

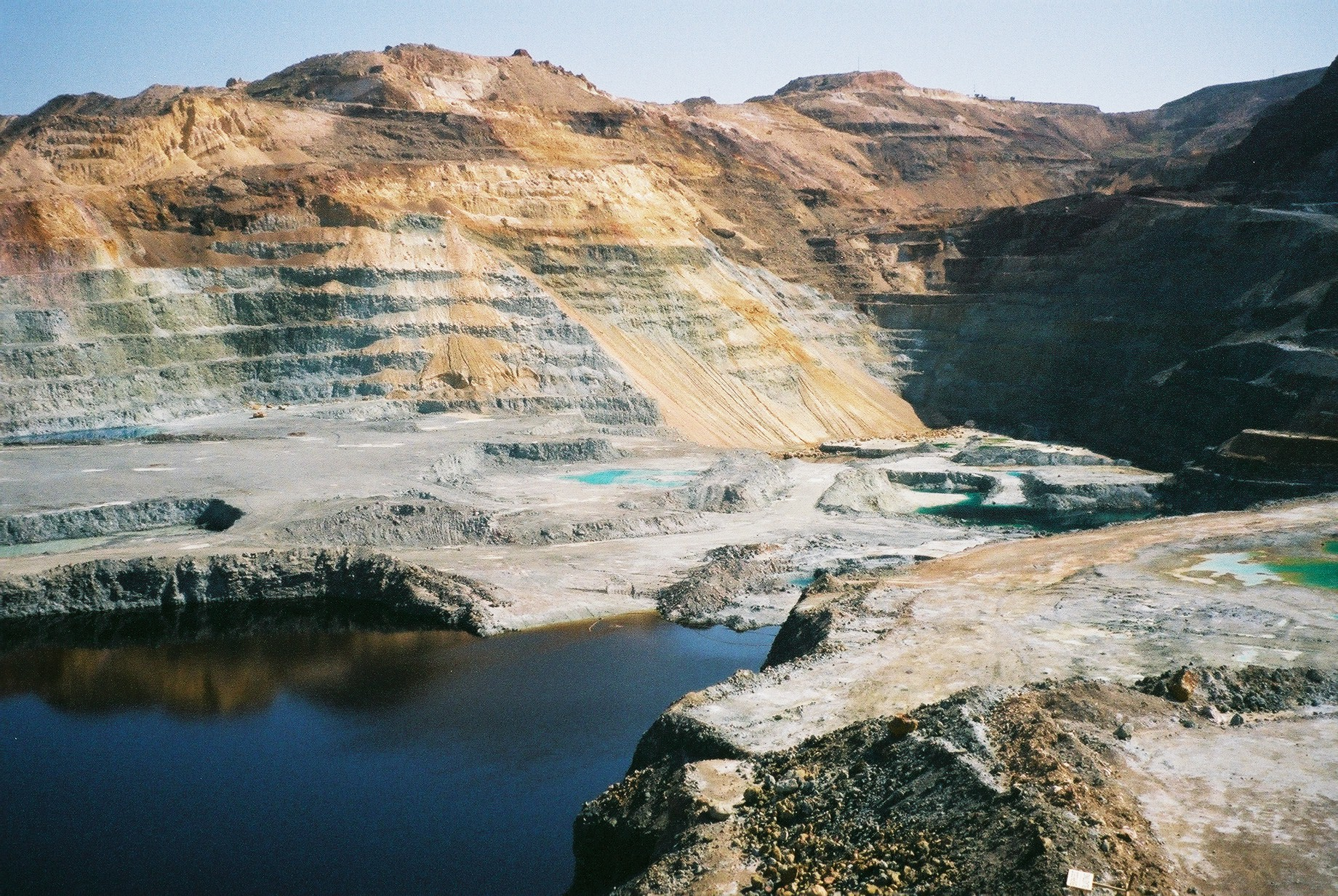
Open pit copper mine Skouriotissa in Cyprus.

The mining industry of Cyprus is synonymous with copper extraction which began around 4,000 BC. Copper dominates the mining sector along with mining of iron pyrite, gold, chromites and asbestos fibers, bentonite, cement, and also petroleum. Though at one time, copper was a mainstay of the economy, as of 2012, the mining sector does not contribute in a significant way to the GNP.

Mining industry of Cyprus has been on the decline for the last four decades, with the Skouriotissa copper mine run by Cyprus Mines Corporation being the only exception.

== History ==
The name Cyprus is a derivative of Kúpros, which the Greeks called the island, and means cuprous, synonymous with copper. Copper production can be dated to the fourth millennium BC, when it was used to make tools. The people of ancient Cyprus were known for their metalworking skills. To extract the high grade metal copper, called "copper talents", they prospected most of the areas containing copper. In the Bronze Age copper could be found on the surface, but as these depleted, underground extraction methods were adopted. The northern slopes of the Troodos Mountains, in the Pillow Lavas Series of Troodos Ophiolite, contained vast amounts of copper bearing ores. The wastes of the metal extraction process, known as "ancient slug", lying outside the mines, contains slight traces of residual copper, but are inaccessible as the mines are currently legislatively protected monuments. During the Roman period Cyprus and Spain were the main sources of copper for the Roman Empire copper requirements, but after the downfall of the Roman Empire, copper mining went dormant until the 19th century. From the 19th century, the need for producing sulfur revived the mining industry, mainly for extraction of pyrite and chalcopyrite, but copper was also extracted.

In 1878 Cyprus was colonized by the British Empire, changing the social and political realms of the country. During the mid-1920s, the industry in the country was controlled by foreign companies, including the mining industry, which at the time was the most important industrial sector in the economy. The British administration gave foreign companies, "extra-territorial rights" and the latitude to exploit workers, conditions which were ideal, during and after World War I. The workers had no rights or protections under the existent legislation, as there was no labour code. Nor did the colonial administration favour introducing any type of regulation for limiting the miner's working hours, providing for medical care or workers' welfare, or anti-exploitation laws of any kind.

Possibly the world's oldest operational mine, the Skouriotissa copper mine, was founded in 1914 by the Cyprus Mines Corporation. During World War II copper mining was suspended, but then resumed until the 1974 Cypriot coup d'état. At the end of the conflict, the cease-fire demarcation line divided the holdings of the largest mining firm in the country, Cyprus Mines, causing their shutdown and sale to Hellenic Copper Mines Ltd. As a result of near complete extraction of copper and iron pyrite ore, and the expense of extracting the remaining low grade deposits companies which had resumed operations after the conflict operated on smaller scales. Falling international copper prices created a recession forcing the other companies to cease mining production entirely by 1979. In 1981, Hellenic Ltd. began recovering copper from leaching waste, ceased that production in 1993, but reopened mining operations at Skouriotissa in 1996.

== Production and impact ==
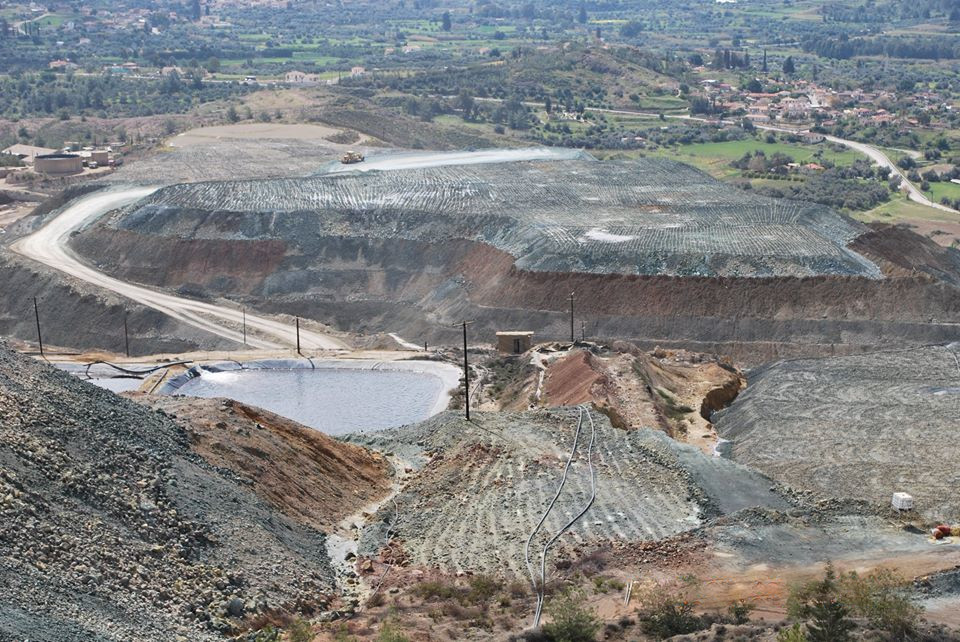
Open pit copper mine Skouriotissa in Cyprus.

According to data released by the statistical service of the government for the year 2011, mining and quarrying sectors produced a total value of €79.5 million ($105.3 million), which reflected a drop of €46.4 million ($61.4 million) in value-added products, such as finished metal works. This sector employed 534 people.

The low-grade copper waste material of the Skouriotissa mines facility has been processed by leaching through the solvent extraction and electrowinning method. In 2012, their production reported production of 99.99% pure copper metal cathodes. Mineral commodities that have been mined include asbestos, bentonite, chromite and sulfide minerals, as well as stone products including cement, gravel and sand. Other marketable minerals including clay, gypsum, lime, ocher and umber production have been recorded. Exploratory drilling permits have been issued to companies searching for gold, natural gas and petroleum deposits.

== Legal framework ==
The Mines and Quarries (regulation) Law, 1959; the Mines and Quarries regulations, 1958–1979; and the Cyprus standard and Control of Quality Law 1975 (Ministry of Agriculture, Natural Resources and Environment, 2012) are the legal instruments in force in the mining sector. The Ministry of Agriculture, Natural Resources and Environment has two departments responsible for regulating the mining industry. The Mines Service serves as administrator for the mineral operations of the country and the Geological Survey Department maintains oversight in evaluating mining resources and all mineral exploration programmes.

== Commodities ==
In recent years the mining sector, particularly its copper deposits, has shown positive signals of recovery as a result of high copper prices and technological improvements in the sector. Thirty copper deposits have been identified, with resources of 50,000 to 20 million tonnes of grades from 0.3 to 4.5 percent copper. Apart from the intense mining activity occurring in the main districts of Kalavassos, Kambia, Limni, Skouriotissa and Tamassos, ore is also being extracted from mines near Mangaleni in Limassol, Peravasa in Limassol and Vretchia and the Troulli Mine in Larnaca, to a lesser degree. Geologically the ore genesis model shows Cyprus’ copper deposits were created by volcanic activity. A better understanding of how the ore was formed has allowed Hellenic Copper Mines Ltd. to utilize extraction methods which result in higher yields. Their copper exports from the Skouriotissa mine were valued at US$13.1 million during 2010. As another example of increasing production based on knowledge of the volcanic nature of development, the Klirou copper-zinc property, which the EMED Mining (now known as Atalaya Mining) has studied, has a high potential for exploitation. This facility is about 20 kilometres (12 mi) to the southwest of Nicosia where the deposits extend to 200 metres (660 ft) depth. Shallow cover rocks over the volcanogenic massive sulfide ore deposits indicate that ores can be extracted utilizing the open pit method.

In addition to copper, Canadian and Swedish companies have explored areas of the Troodos complex and found evidence of surface gold. Core drilling permits have been sought for further exploration. Multiple companies have been involved in exploration for natural gas and petroleum deposits. Though no production had begun as of 2012, a U.S. firm, Nobel Energy, Inc., discovered a field that could be exploited.

== Bibliography ==
- Katsourides, Yiannos (30 June 2014). History of the Communist Party in Cyprus: Colonialism, Class and the Cypriot Left. I.B.Tauris. ISBN 978-1-78076-174-9.
