= Chemistry Building =

Chemistry Building may refer to:

- Gilman Hall, long known as the Chemistry Building, home of University of California at Berkeley College of Chemistry
- Old Main and Chemistry Building at Widener University
- Seeley G. Mudd Chemistry Building at Vassar College
- University of Arkansas Chemistry Building
- University of Melbourne Chemistry Building
