= SMAW =

SMAW may refer to:

- Mk 153 Shoulder-Launched Multipurpose Assault Weapon
- Shielded metal arc welding

== See also ==
- SMAWK algorithm
