= Joseph Platt =

Joseph Platt may refer to:

- Joseph Platt (politician) (1672–1748), American politician
- Joseph Platt (university president) (1915–2012), American physicist and academic administrator
