= Cyprus Amax Minerals =

US mining company

Cyprus Amax Minerals Company
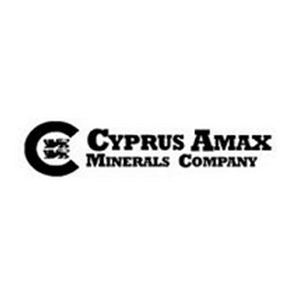
- Company type: Formerly listed on NYSE
- Industry: nonferrous metals
- Predecessor: Cyprus Mines Corporation
- Founded: 1916
- Founder: Seeley W. Mudd
- Defunct: 1999
- Fate: Merged with Phelps Dodge
- Successor: Cyprus Amax Minerals

Cyprus Amax Minerals was a major US-based mining company formed in 1993 through the merger of AMAX with the Cyprus Minerals Company. It was one of the world's largest producers of Molybdenum and Lithium and a leading producer of copper and coal. It also produced iron ore and gold. It was acquired by the Phelps Dodge Corporation in 1999.

== Background ==
In 1979, Cyprus Mines Corporation was acquired by Amoco Corporation. Amoco expanded Cyprus into a diversified worldwide mining company. Amoco spun off Cyprus Minerals Company in 1985.

In 1986, Cyprus acquired the Sierrita copper and molybdenum mine near Tucson, Arizona.

In July 1988, Cyprus Minerals bought the Inspiration mine and smelting complex in Miami, Arizona. With the expiry of an agreement to purchase electricity at a favorable rate from the Salt River Project, Cyprus Minerals installed an ISASMELT furnace in its copper smelter. This was the first large-scale installation of the ISASMELT process, which was developed jointly by Mount Isa Mines Limited and the Australian government's Commonwealth Scientific and Industrial Research Organisation ("CSIRO").

AMAX Inc. (formerly the American Metal Company) was a mining company based in New York with interests in coal and gold. It was the result of the merger, in 1957, between the long-established American Metal Company and the Climax Molybdenum Company.

== Merger ==
In 1993, AMAX Inc. merged with the Cyprus Minerals Company to form Cyprus Amax Minerals Company. The merged entity was the world's leading producer of molybdenum and lithium, and a leading producer of copper and coal. The company had operations in 24 states and on six continents.

== Acquisition and Later History ==
In late 1999, Cyprus Amax Minerals was acquired by Phelps Dodge Corporation, which in turn was acquired by Freeport-McMoRan (NYSE: FCX) in 2007, forming the world's largest copper producer.
