= Nick Pippenger =

Computer scientist

- Education: B.S., Shimer College; Ph.D., Massachusetts Institute of Technology
- Spouse(s): Maria Klawe, 1980
- Children: Two children
- Scientific career
- Fields: Computer science
- Workplaces: Harvey Mudd College, Princeton University, University of British Columbia

Nicholas John Pippenger is a researcher in computer science. He has produced a number of fundamental results many of which are being widely used in the field of theoretical computer science, database processing and compiler optimization. He has also achieved the rank of IBM Fellow at Almaden IBM Research Center in San Jose, California. He has taught at the University of British Columbia in Vancouver, British Columbia, Canada and at Princeton University in the US. In the Fall of 2006 Pippenger joined the faculty of Harvey Mudd College.

Pippenger holds a B.S. in Natural Sciences from Shimer College and a PhD from the Massachusetts Institute of Technology. He is married to Maria Klawe, former President of Harvey Mudd College. In 1997 he was inducted as a Fellow of the Association for Computing Machinery. In 2013 he became a fellow of the American Mathematical Society.

The complexity class, Nick's Class (NC), of problems quickly solvable on a parallel computer, was named by Stephen Cook after Nick Pippenger for his research on circuits with polylogarithmic depth and polynomial size.

Pippenger became one of the most recent mathematicians to write a technical article in Latin, when he published a brief derivation of a new formula for e, whereby the Wallis product for π is modified by taking roots of its terms:

$$\frac{e}{2} = \left(\frac{2}{1}\right)^{1/2} \left(\frac{2}{3}\frac{4}{3}\right)^{1/4} \left(\frac{4}{5}\frac{6}{5}\frac{6}{7}\frac{8}{7}\right)^{1/8} \cdots.$$
