= Henry T. Mudd =

Henry Thomas Mudd
- Born: Henry Thomas Mudd; December 26, 1913; Los Angeles, California
- Died: September 10, 1990 (aged 77); La Jolla, California
- Spouse: Victoria Nebeker Kolly
- Children: 4
- Parents: Harvey Seeley Mudd; Mildred Esterbrook Mudd
- Relatives: Seeley W. Mudd (grandfather)

Henry Thomas Mudd (December 26, 1913 – September 10, 1990) was an American heir, businessman and philanthropist. He served as chairman and chief executive officer of the Cyprus Mines Corporation. He also co-founded Harvey Mudd College in Claremont, California.

== Biography ==
=== Early life ===
He was born in Los Angeles, California, in 1913. His father was Harvey Seeley Mudd (1888–1955) and his mother, Mildred Esterbrook Mudd (1891–1958). He had a sister, Caryll Mudd Sprague (1914–1978). His paternal uncle was Seeley G. Mudd (1895–1968). His paternal grandfather was Seeley W. Mudd (1861–1926).

He received a B.A. from Stanford University in 1935, and an MS in Mining Engineering from the Massachusetts Institute of Technology in Cambridge, Massachusetts, in 1938. He then served in the Second World War.

=== Career ===
He served as president of the American Institute of Mining, Metallurgical, and Petroleum Engineers in 1945. The following year, in 1946, he started his career at the Cyprus Mines Corporation, his family business, as assistant general manager. By 1955, he became its chairman and chief executive officer. He also sat on the board of directors of KCET, a public television station.

=== Philanthropy ===
Together with his mother, he co-founded Harvey Mudd College in Claremont, California, in 1955. He served on its board of trustees from 1958 to 1981.

He sat on the boards of trustees of the Los Angeles County Museum of Art, the Los Angeles Civic Light Opera Association and the Los Angeles World Affairs Council.

=== Personal life ===
He was married to Victoria Nebeker Coberly. They had two sons and two daughters. After his death, his estate was sued for palimony by a woman he allegedly had an affair with.
