= Harvey Seeley Mudd =

American mining engineer and entrepreneur (1888–1955)

- Born: August 30, 1888; Leadville, Colorado, U.S.
- Died: April 12, 1955 (aged 66); Los Angeles, California, U.S.
- Occupation: Mining engineer
- Known for: Harvey Mudd College, founded in his honor
- Spouse: Mildred Mudd
- Children: 2, including Henry T. Mudd
- Parent: Seeley W. Mudd
- Relatives: Seeley G. Mudd (brother)

Harvey Seeley Mudd (30 August 1888 – 12 April 1955) was an American mining engineer and founder, investor, and president of Cyprus Mines Corporation, a Los Angeles–based international enterprise that operated copper mines on the island of Cyprus.

Mudd was vice president of the board of trustees for the California Institute of Technology. He helped found Claremont McKenna College. The science and engineering college Harvey Mudd College at Claremont was named in memory of him. Mudd was chair of local symphony organizations and art museums.

== Early life ==
Harvey Mudd was born in Leadville, Colorado, in 1888 to Colonel Seeley W. Mudd, the manager of the Small Hopes silver mine, and Della Mulock Mudd.

Harvey had a younger brother, Seeley, who was a physician and cancer researcher at the California Institute of Technology and then professor and dean at the School of Medicine at the University of Southern California.

In 1902, Col. Mudd moved his family to Los Angeles, California, where he worked as a consulting engineer for the Guggenheim Exploration Company. In 1907, he developed the Ray mine in Arizona, which is still in production. Harvey attended Stanford University for two years and then transferred to Columbia University, where he received a degree in mining engineering in 1912.

== Career ==
=== Mining ===
Mudd and his father founded the Cyprus Mines Corporation in 1916. The Los Angeles–based enterprise started with development of the copper mines on the island of Cyprus. However, at the time the Mudds began the Cyprus Mines Corp., copper had not been mined on Cyprus for almost 1500 years. With the backing of Colonel Seeley Mudd, geologist Charles Godfrey Gunther searched for new copper on Cyprus, but it was twenty years before Cyprus Mines paid its first dividends in 1936.

In 1918, Mudd became president of Cyprus Mines Corporation. Mudd became chairman of Cyprus Mines in 1926 when his father died. As head of Cyprus Mines, Harvey Mudd developed and managed copper mines in the Mediterranean, as well as an iron mine in Peru and oil properties in the United States.

At the time of Harvey Mudd's death in 1955, the company's copper mines on Cyprus had become the island's largest industry, exporting nearly a million tons of copper a year. Mudd's copper mines on Cyprus supported 2,000 of the island's inhabitants and provided more than 25 percent of the island's entire annual revenue. Cyprus Mines paid its employees 15–20 percent above the island average. The company ran an up-to-date, 65-bed hospital for its employees, built scores of low-cost houses for them to live in, and helped to run schools, sports clubs, welfare centers, and summer camps for their families.

Mudd served as president of the American Institute of Mining and Metallurgical Engineers in 1945. In 1949, the Columbia University Engineering School Alumni Association awarded him its Egleston Medal for distinguished engineering achievement.

=== Caltech ===
Mudd became a member of the board of trustees for the California Institute of Technology in 1929. He served on the finance and executive committees and was vice president of the board of trustees. In 1954, Caltech faculty member Linus Pauling, upon winning the Nobel Prize in chemistry, sent Mudd a letter thanking him and the Caltech Board of Trustees for "providing here an atmosphere, second to none in the world, that is favorable to research".

Mudd's will left $50,000 to Caltech for research on the genesis of ore deposits. Two geology buildings at Caltech are named for family members. The Seeley G. Mudd Building (South Mudd) is named for his brother, and the Seeley W. Mudd Laboratory (North Mudd) is named for their father.

=== Civic leadership ===
At the time of Mudd's death, he was chairman of the Board of the Southern California Symphony Association, the Welfare Federation of Los Angeles, and Greater Los Angeles Plans, Inc. He was a trustee and former president of the Southwest Museum, a member of the Board of Governors of the Los Angeles County Museum of Art, and member of the advisory committee of the Henry E. Huntington Library and Art Gallery.

As Chairman of the Southern California Symphony Association, Mudd is credited with saving the Los Angeles Philharmonic. Fellow copper baron William Andrews Clark Jr. had founded the Philharmonic in 1919, but he had exhausted his fortune supporting the orchestra. To oversee the Philharmonic, the Southern California Symphony Association was created in 1933 with Mudd as chairman. Mudd personally guaranteed the salary of conductor Otto Klemperer. Mudd led fundraising efforts to enable the Philharmonic to continue performing through the Great Depression. Mudd is also credited with starting the Philharmonic's tradition of taking the stuffiness out of high culture. He was initiated as an honorary member of the Beta Psi chapter of Phi Mu Alpha Sinfonia, the national fraternity for men in music, in 1941.

=== Claremont Colleges ===
Mudd had a particular interest in The Claremont Colleges in Claremont, California. He served as chairman of the Board of Fellows of Claremont College, now The Claremont Graduate University and University Center, for a quarter of a century. Harvey Mudd helped in the founding of Claremont McKenna College in 1945. He helped to plan Claremont's new undergraduate college of science and engineering that was chartered in 1955, shortly after his death. He was also chairman of the Board of Fellows of Claremont College.

== Personal life ==
Mudd married Mildred Esterbrook, the daughter of Mary Nichols and Richard Esterbrook (grandson of Richard Esterbrook), on March 12, 1913. They had two children: Henry T. Mudd and Caryll Mudd Sprague. Caryll's husband was Norman F. Sprague Jr., a medical doctor. Henry succeeded his father as head of the Cyprus Mines Corporation.

In her youth, Mildred attended the Veltin School for Girls in Manhattan, New York. When she became an adult, she was a social welfare leader. She became involved with the Girl Scouts in 1934 at the recommendation of Lou Henry Hoover, the wife of former U.S. President Herbert Hoover. For three years, beginning in 1934, she was the Los Angeles County Council commissioner of the Girl Scouts. Between 1934 and 1939, Mildred was able to double the enrollment in Los Angeles. She served as the national president of the Girl Scouts by 1938 and from 1939 to 1941. She had been the director of the Children's Hospital in Los Angeles by 1938. In 1939, Time magazine described her as "Tall, dark, [and] slender" and as "a typical society matron, noted for her large and lavish parties, her charitable activities, [and] her ancient Roman jewelry (dug up in Cyprus)".

Mudd lived in Beverly Hills on Benedict Canyon Drive. The Tudor style residence was designed for Charles Boldt, owner of the Ohio-based Boldt Glass Co. that produced the popular Mason jars, by architect Elmer Grey in 1922. The residence is on an acre of land with seven bedrooms and a swimming pool. In 2008, the house was listed for sale at a price of $11.495 million. The historic property is known as the Harvey Mudd Estate. As of October 2013, this house is for sale again, asking price is $19.99 million.

Mudd died of a heart attack on April 12, 1955, at his home in Beverly Hills, California. He was 66 years old. Mildred Mudd died three years later at the age of 67.

== Harvey Mudd College ==
After Mudd's death in 1955, Mildred Mudd supported the founding later that year of the planned undergraduate college of science and engineering college at Claremont, which would be named for him. Mildred and family members contributed $2 million to endow Harvey Mudd College, which awards degrees in science and engineering. The degree programs require humanities and social science coursework. Mildred was elected as the first chairman of the board of trustees of the college, serving from 1955 until 1958.

Harvey S. Mudd acquired a collection of Cypriot artefacts in the 1930s from the antiquities market over his time in Cyprus, which was later donated to the college after its founding. The collection of over 250 ceramic, metal, and stone items worth over $100,000 was then housed in Sprague Center until 2019 when Harvey Mudd College then-president Maria Klawe signed an agreement with the University of Cyprus' Director of Archaeological Research, Vasiliki Kassianidou, to return to Cyprus and stored in the university's "Stelios Ioannou" Library.
