= Harriet Nembhard =

American academic administrator

6th President of Harvey Mudd College
- Incumbent
- Assumed office July 1, 2023
- Preceded by: Maria Klawe

Personal details
- Born: December 7, 1967 (age 57)
- Education: Arizona State University; Claremont McKenna College; University of Michigan

Harriet Black Nembhard (born December 7, 1967) is the President of Harvey Mudd College in Claremont, California. From July 2020 through June 2023, she served as the Dean of the University of Iowa College of Engineering and the Roy J. Carver Professor of Industrial and Systems Engineering at that institution.

Her academic research focuses on complex systems and healthcare engineering. She is married to American academic David Nembhard.

== Education and early career ==
Nembhard earned a bachelor's degree in management from Claremont McKenna College, and a second in industrial engineering from Arizona State University in 1990. She studied Industrial and Operation Systems at the University of Michigan, earning a master's degree and a PhD in 1994. Her PhD thesis, A Transient Period Control Methodology for Continuous Mix Manufacturing, looked at control methods in manufacturing systems. During her studies, she was a summer placement student at PepsiCo, and became interested in quality control. She was an assistant professor at Auburn University until 1998. She designed models to gain insight into statistical control. She worked at École Centrale Paris.

== Research ==
Nembhard was made an associate professor at University of Wisconsin–Madison in 1998.

She joined Pennsylvania State University as an associate professor in 2004 and was appointed director of the Center for Integrated Healthcare Delivery Systems. Nembhard uses statistics and productivity to develop systems engineering approaches to improve healthcare, and is a certified Six Sigma black belt. In 2011 Nembhard was promoted to professor and made the co-director of the National Science Foundation Centre for Health Organisation Transformation. In 2015 she was a member of the Penn State Hershey Leadership Academy for Excellence in Academic Medicine. She led the Department of Industrial and Manufacturing Engineering from 2015 to 2016. She was awarded the Clinical and Translational Science Award for her work on the treatment of people with Parkinson's disease. She developed non-wearable sensors to monitor the movement deterioration of Parkinson's patients, allowing healthcare professionals to modify medication or therapeutics. The sensor-based monitoring systems are known as Patients, Analysis, Statistical learning and decision Support (PASS). She also developed interventions to support chronic heart failure.

She joined Oregon State University in 2016. Nembhard was part of a multi-institution National Science Foundation CAREER Award that studies health inequities, launching the EMpowering People to achieve Optimal Well-being through Engineering Research (EMPOWER) Center that will help communities address inequality. In 2018 Nembhard was made a Drexel University ELATE at Drexel faculty fellow. Before leaving Oregon State University for the University of Iowa in June 2020, she was the Eric R. Smith Professor of Engineering and head of the School of Mechanical, Industrial and Manufacturing Engineering at Oregon State University.

== Awards and honours ==
- 2009 American Society for Quality Fellow
- 2011 Elected to the International Academy for Quality
- 2014 American Society for Quality Feigenbaum Medal

== Publications and patents ==
- 2009 Real Options in Engineering Design, Operations, and Management
- 2013 Polycrystalline complex-shaped mesoscale components (patent)
- 2016 Healthcare Delivery Systems, Wiley
