= Jennifer Holmgren =

Colombian chemist (born 1962)

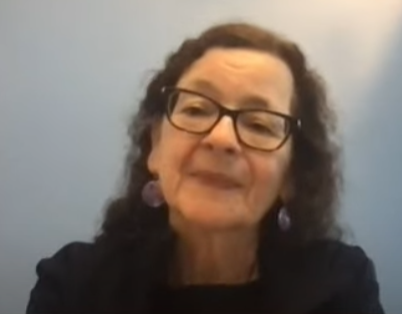
- Speaking at the World Economic Forum's Sustainable Development Impact Summit 2021
- Born: 1962 (age 63–64); Colombia
- Education: Harvey Mudd College; University of Chicago; University of Illinois Urbana-Champaign
- Occupation: Chemist

Jennifer Holmgren (born 1962) is a Colombian chemist specializing in chemical technologies and fuel research. She is presently the CEO of LanzaTech, a company dedicated to sustainability by using gas fermentation products to create materials essential for everyday life.

== Early life ==
Holmgren, the eldest of three children, was born in Colombia and migrated to the United States with her family when her father, an aircraft mechanic, got a new job with Avianca, a Colombian airline. Her mother, a homemaker, worked odd jobs when and where she could. Both of Holmgren's parents were proponents of education. While still a child in Colombia, Holmgren had a fascination with the universe and dreams of space travel. Upon her family's move to the United States, Holmgren attended a high school in Los Angeles and developed interests in chemistry and STEM. With the encouragement of her teachers, Holmgren continued her endeavors in STEM and created a space for herself in the male-dominated field. Her father's work as an aircraft mechanic inspired her to contribute to the field of aviation at Universal Oil Products. She claims that aviation is her first love. An aptitude for academics and support from family and educators aided in her success.

== Education ==
Holmgren graduated from Harvey Mudd College with a Bachelor of Science degree. She also holds an MBA from the University of Chicago and a PhD from the University of Illinois Urbana-Champaign.

== Career ==
Holmgren has worked to promote and expand the field of chemical technologies and fuel. She was the former vice president and General Manager, Renewable Energy and Chemicals at Universal Oil Products (UOP). During her time at UOP she led renewable technology that was useful in fuel production for use in the field of aviation. Holmgren is currently the chief Executive Officer at LanzaTech and sits on the board for Bio Energy Research. LanzaTech is a carbon recycling company that uses bacteria to transform carbon into ethanol. Compared to traditional petroleum methods, LanzaTech's waste gas-to-ethanol process (biomass gasification) reduces life-cycle greenhouse gas emissions by 67-98%. Since working at LanzaTech, Holmgren has arranged for repurpose facilities to be built across the world to create chemicals and fuel from carbon sequestration. Her work in both organizations has contributed to the popularization of new biofuel mechanization. Under Holmgren's guidance, LanzaTech ceased making jet fuel and formed, LanzaJet, a profit-driven production plant located in Soperton, Georgia, which will begin operating in 2023..In 2024, Holmgren showed a jacket created from recycled carbon emissions, highlighting LanzaTech's ability to convert pollution into customer products. In September 2025, LanzaTech released they are working with others to create ehtanol to create SAF in the US, which LanzaTech is already working with in three other countries, such as China, Europe, India, and soon Japan.

== Awards and achievements ==
Since her time at LanzaTech, Holmgren, along with her crew has received the United States Environmental Protection Agency Presidential Green Chemistry Award in 2015. She also received an Outstanding Leadership Award in Corporate Social Innovation from the YMCA Metropolitan Chicago and the BIO Rosalind Franklin Award for Leadership in Industrial Biotechnology in 2015. In 2017, Holmgren was titled the most influential leader in the Bioeconomy sector and acquired an award in leadership from Global Bioenergy in 2018.

Holmgren has been the author and co-author of 20 scientific publications and has also been a part of 50 patents and publications.

In 2023, Holmgren was recognized in Forbes magazine's "50 Over 50: Innovation" for her work as the CEO of LanzaTech.

In 2022, Holmgren received an honorary doctorate degree from Delft University of Technology and was classified as a Top 40 Power Player by the Independent Commodity Intelligence Service.

In 2022, LanzaTech entered the Earthshot competition for their carbon recycling technology. LanzaTech is one of 15 finalist, the only finalist from the United States. The competition had the support of Prince William who established the prize.

In 2023, Holmgren was included in TIME magazine's "Climate 100" list recognizing influential leaders working on climate solutions.
