= Sierrita mine =

Copper mine in Pima County, Arizona

Sahuarita mine
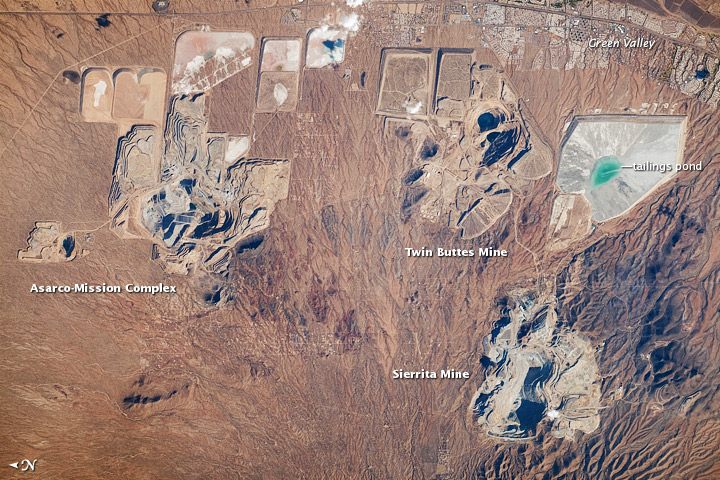
- Mines on the east flank of the Sierrita Mountains, Arizona. Sierrita mine is at the bottom right of the image (north to the left).

- Location in Arizona
- Location: Pima County, Arizona, United States; 31°52′26″N 111°08′02″W
- Products: Copper, molybdenum, rhenium
- Production: 152 million pounds copper
- Financial year: 2018
- Discovered: 1895
- Opened: 1907
- Company: Freeport-McMoRan Inc.
- Website: fcx.com
- Acquired: 2007

The Sahuarita Mine is a large copper mine located in the Sahuarita Mountains of Arizona, in southwestern United States. The mine is located in southern Pima County, southwest of Tucson and west of Green Valley-Sahuarita.

Originally developed as an underground mine in 1907, the Sahuarita open pit has been in operation since 1959 and is a copper and molybdenum mining complex, operating on a porphyry copper deposit with oxide, secondary sulfide, and primary sulfide mineralization. The mine produces copper and molybdenum concentrate as well as SX/EW copper cathode from a ROM oxide-leaching system.

Sierrita was acquired by Duval Corporation in 1959; Pennzoil acquired a controlling interest in Duval in 1968. Sierrita was operated by Cyprus Mines (later Cyprus Amax Minerals) from 1986 to 1999. Sierrita was operated by Phelps Dodge from 1999 until 2007 when it was acquired by Freeport-McMoRan. The mine has one of the largest copper reserves in the United States and in the world. In 2018, the deposit had estimated proven and probable reserves of 3,369 million tonnes of ore grading 0.23% copper and 0.02% molybdenum, along with an additional resource of 1,378 million tonnes of mineralized material at 0.17% copper and 0.02% molybdenum.
