= Seeley G. Mudd Chemistry Building =

American chemistry laboratory

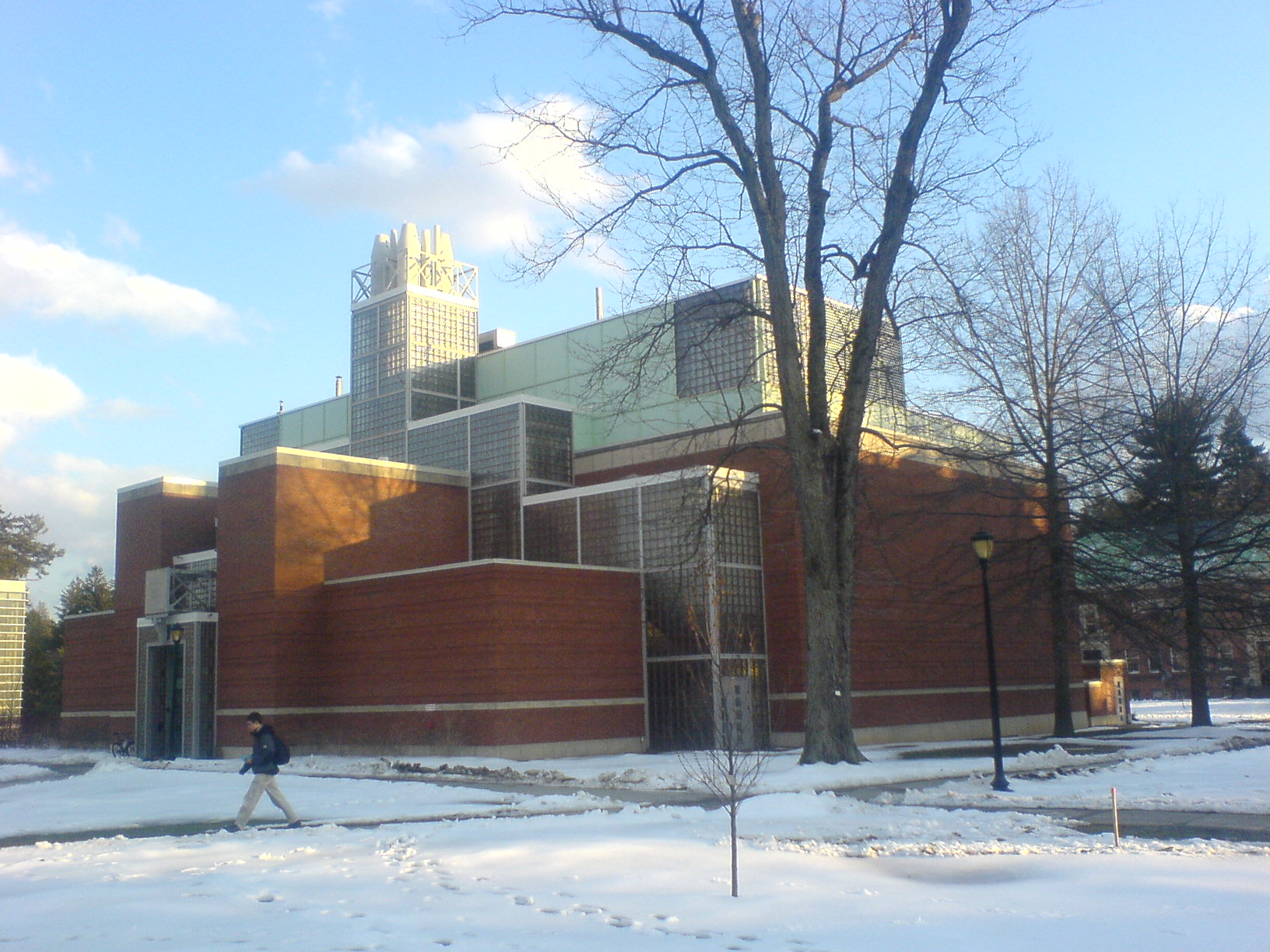
- Mudd Chemistry Building in 2008
- Interactive map of the Seeley G. Mudd Chemistry Building area

General information
- Status: Demolished
- Type: Classroom, laboratory
- Architectural style: Postmodernism
- Location: Poughkeepsie, New York, United States
- Coordinates: 41.685484°N 73.894722°W
- Current tenants: Vassar College
- Groundbreaking: October 8, 1982
- Demolished: Spring 2016
- Cost: $7.2 million (1984)
- Owner: Vassar College

Technical details
- Material: Limestone, brick, glass blocks
- Floor count: Three
- Floor area: 42,000 square feet (3,900 m^{2})

Design and construction
- Architecture firm: Perry Dean Rogers Architects
- Structural engineer: Zaldastani Associates
- Services engineer: Fred Dubin
- Main contractor: W. J. Barney Corporation

The Seeley G. Mudd Chemistry Building was a chemistry laboratory and classroom building on the campus of Vassar College in the town of Poughkeepsie, New York. The 42,000-square-foot (3,900 m^{2}) postmodern building stood on the north end of a cluster of other science buildings on the site of the school's first chemistry laboratory. It was completed in 1984 at a cost of $7.2 million after the college received money from a fund bequeathed to it in the will of California cardiologist and professor Seeley G. Mudd. The structure replaced Sanders Hall of Chemistry and included elements designed to be energy efficient, notably a large wall of glass blocks that designers hoped would passively heat the building. Reviews of the structure were positive when it opened with critics praising the way its form complemented nearby older buildings. By 2015, many aspects of the building had been evaluated as being in Fair or Poor condition and the building was demolished in April 2016 as part of the Science Center project, later replaced with an open green space.

== History ==
Vassar Brothers Laboratory was the first chemistry building on the campus of Vassar College in the town of Poughkeepsie, New York, built in 1880, around 500 feet (150 m) from the college's Main Building. The Laboratory, which was the first free-standing chemistry structure at a women's college, stood until 1938, 29 years after the construction of its replacement, the Ewing & Chapelle-designed Sanders Hall of Chemistry.

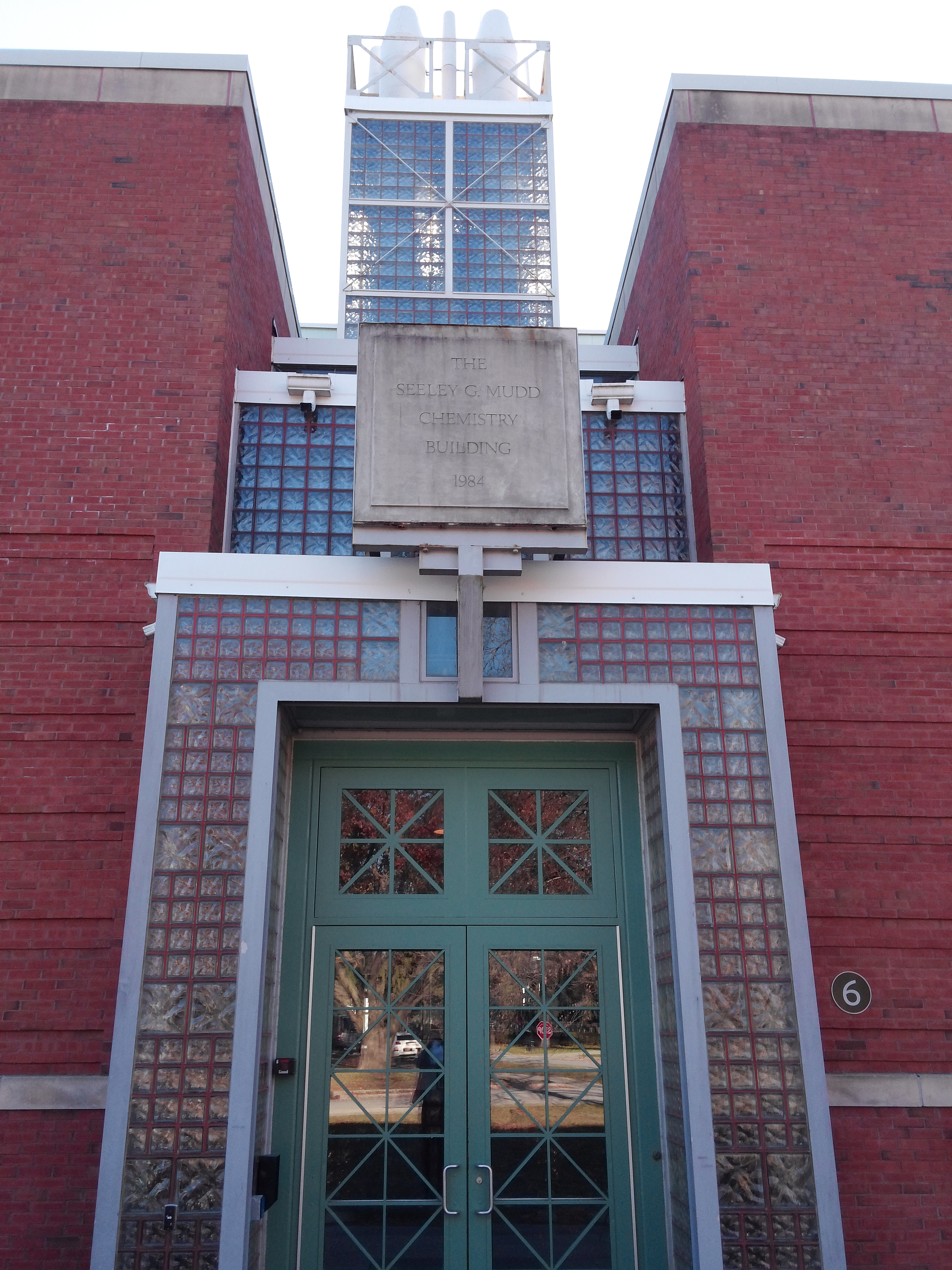
The north entrance to the building, with Mudd's name prominently displayed overhead

In 1981, the Seeley G. Mudd Fund granted Vassar $1.3 million for the construction of a new chemistry building. Mudd was a California-based cardiologist, professor, and trustee with the University of Southern California's School of Medicine as well as with a number of other West Coast schools. Over his lifetime, Mudd donated more than $10 million to higher education institutions and upon his death in 1968, his will established a further $44 million for building construction at universities and colleges, with the stipulation that institutions requesting a grant provide at least half the funds for their projects and that his name be prominently displayed on any buildings receiving the funding. While the cost of the building was originally reported to be $4.5 million, this estimate grew to $6.5 million by 1984 and would ultimately come to $7.2 million once the project was completed. The College planned to cover the costs not paid for by the Mudd Fund with a $100 million development fundraising program that spanned the entirety of the 1980s.

Ground was broken on the new building on October 8, 1982, in a ceremony presided over by Vassar president Virginia B. Smith. Smith had previously selected engineer Fred Dubin to aid the school in constructing a more environmentally friendly chemistry building. As design progressed, she identified the need to hire architects to design the building alongside Dubin, so Perry Dean Rogers Architects of Boston were selected. Named the Seeley G. Mudd Chemistry Building after its benefactor, the building was constructed on the site where Vassar Brothers Laboratory once stood. Dubin initially tried to have it placed on the south side of Sanders Physics Building, but that site was deemed unworkable in part because of its proximity to the school's Shakespeare Gardens. The building was instead placed southwest of Sanders Hall of Chemistry, which would be renamed Sanders Classrooms, and completed a quadrangle consisting of both Sanders buildings and the New England Building. Though built across from Sanders Physics, Mudd was actually 3 feet (0.91 m) out of alignment with it. Zaldastani Associates served as the project's structural engineers and W. J. Barney Corporation served as its general contractor.

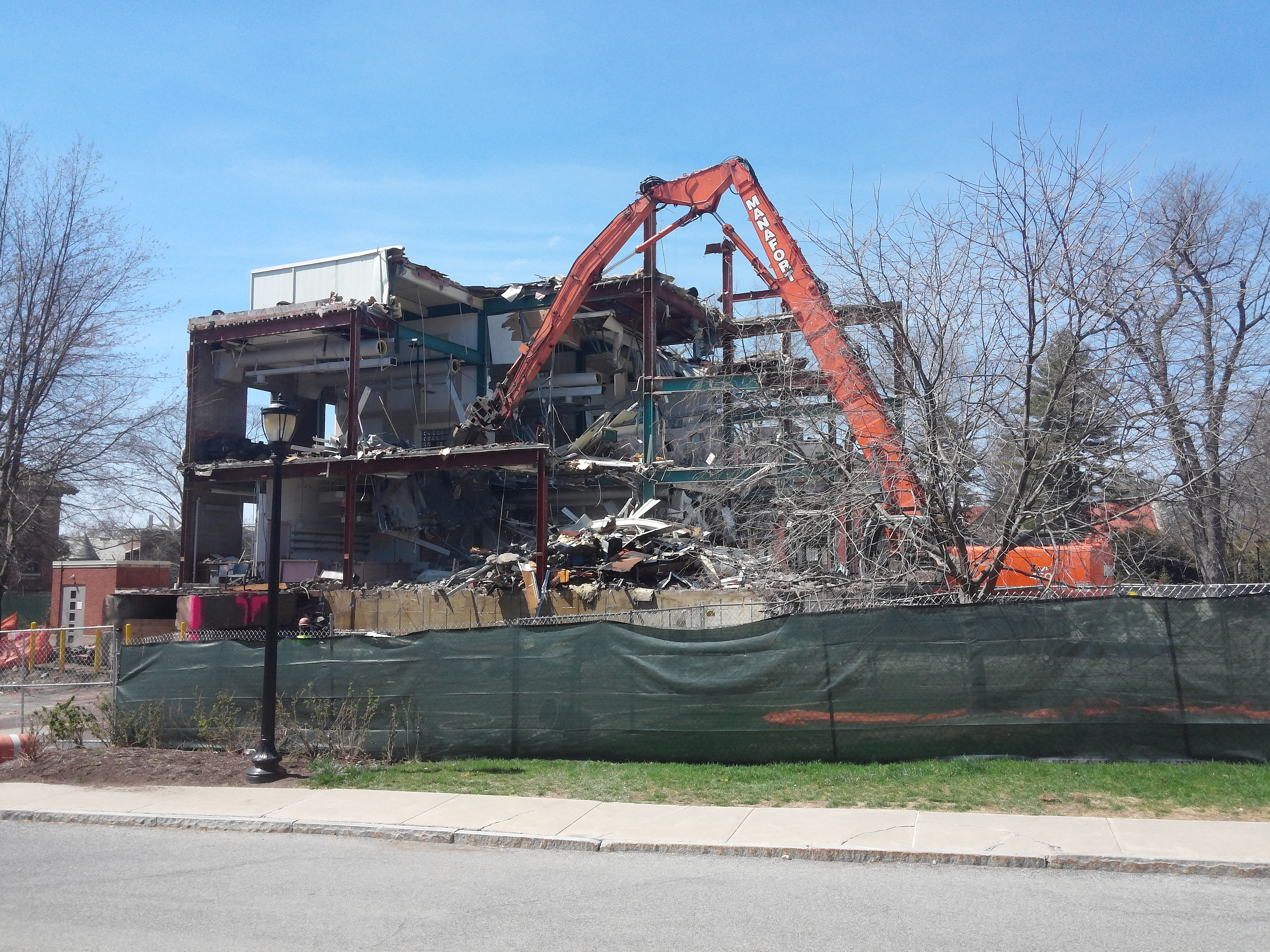
The building's demolition, April 2016

In 2007, despite being Vassar's youngest completed academic building, a report by Platt Byard Dovell White Architects report found that many components of Mudd's structure were in either Fair or Poor condition. The structure was slated for demolition in spring 2016 as part of the college's Science Center project, which also included the construction of the new Bridge for Laboratory Sciences building and the renovations of the New England Building, Sanders Physics, and Olmsted Hall. The chemistry department began its move to the Bridge for Laboratory Sciences in summer 2015 and Mudd's demolition followed. Exterior facade elements, windows, and indoor walls were cut away before the building's frame was dismantled, concluding on April 22, 2016. The site was cleared and replaced with an open green space.

== Features ==
The Seeley G. Mudd Chemistry Building was designed in the postmodern style. The structure's exterior walls were constructed from limestone and brick that surround regular glass blocks, each about 4 inches (10 cm) thick with side lengths ranging from 8 to 12 inches (20 to 30 cm). The brick and limestone walls faced the west, north, and east, while the southern face was primarily glass, a feature designed for efficient energy use; when sunlight hit the wall, air rose into the building and was heated, then pumped throughout where it aided in the operation of the structure's 46 fume hoods. The north wall, meanwhile, was designed to be resistant to cold air. The building was well insulated and its plain outer walls were as uninterrupted in material as possible to keep as much warm air inside the structure as possible in winters.

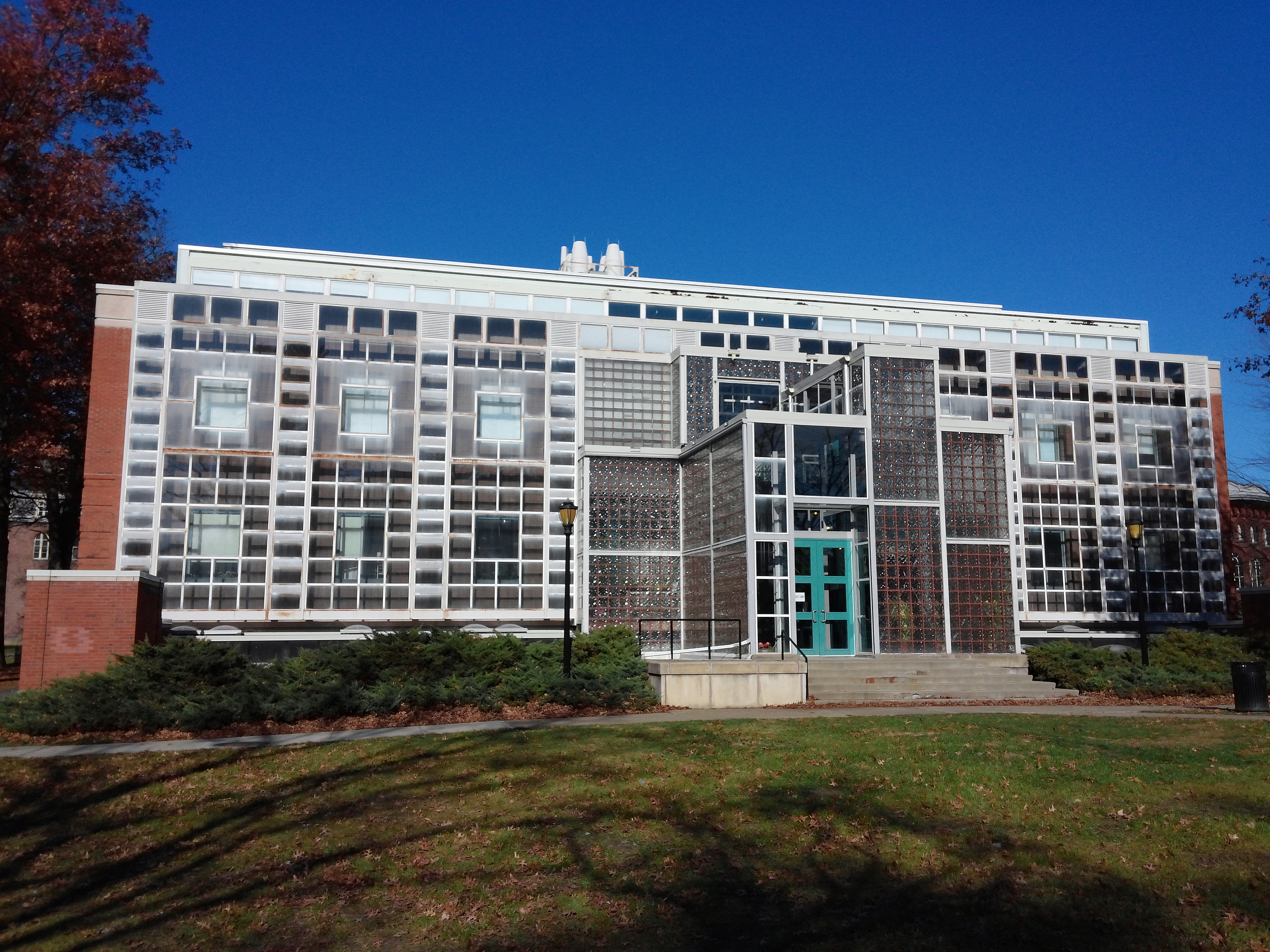
The south side of Mudd with its glass brick wall

Encompassing 42,000 square feet (3,900 m^{2}), the Seeley G. Mudd Chemistry Building stood three stories tall. The second and first floors (the latter of which lies partially below ground) contained laboratory space while the third floor consisted of communal and teaching spaces like classrooms and offices. Other offices on the first floor were lit via skylights. The stairwells in Mudd were designed with the purpose of discouraging students from passing through lab spaces to get from one side of the building to the other. In spite of this, Michael J. Crosbie reported in Architecture in 1986 that students had taken to passing through the building as a shortcut instead of going around it. Furnishings and carpeting in the building were deep blue and rust-colored.

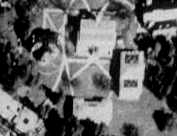
Moving clockwise from top, Mudd, Sanders Classrooms, Sanders Physics, and the New England Building; critics responded favorably to the building's placement relative to its neighbors.

The 2007 report by Platt Byard Dovell White Architects evaluating the condition and context for many of Vassar's buildings found Mudd to be "by far Vassar's most interesting and most important post-Modern building." A contemporary review in Architecture commented that Mudd "responds on a variety of levels to its context, but it does so without sacrificing its own unique and powerful identity." Margaret Gaskie also praised the building's placement and contextualization among its fellow structures in a 1986 issue of Architectural Record: "the scale of the structure beneath its outcroppings is sympathetic to the existing buildings in the quad, and its mass, though larger, [is] appropriate to its role as a gateway between them and the central campus". She went on to positively comment on the building's aesthetics, saying, "the eye can feast on the mingled sparkle and luminosity drawn from minimal outdoor exposures used to maximum effect. In more public areas, where crisp glass-block and lucent glass ignite clear deep-timbered tones and pretty pastels, the feast becomes a banquet." Crosbie in Architecture noted "some instances of shoddy drywall work and sloppy painting" but otherwise praised the building's "bare-bones" and "nuts and bolts" interior as functional and environmentally friendly. The Platt Byard Dovell White report found that Mudd's glass walls "seem to function particularly poorly" as a passive heat control system but otherwise noted that the structure's expressive postmodernist ambitions marked it as "a strong, compact if busy building [that] makes it more than a bit of a tour de force." Mudd was awarded first place in a 1988 competition run by Pittsburgh Corning for its design.
