= Chemistry Building, University of Melbourne =

Chemistry Building
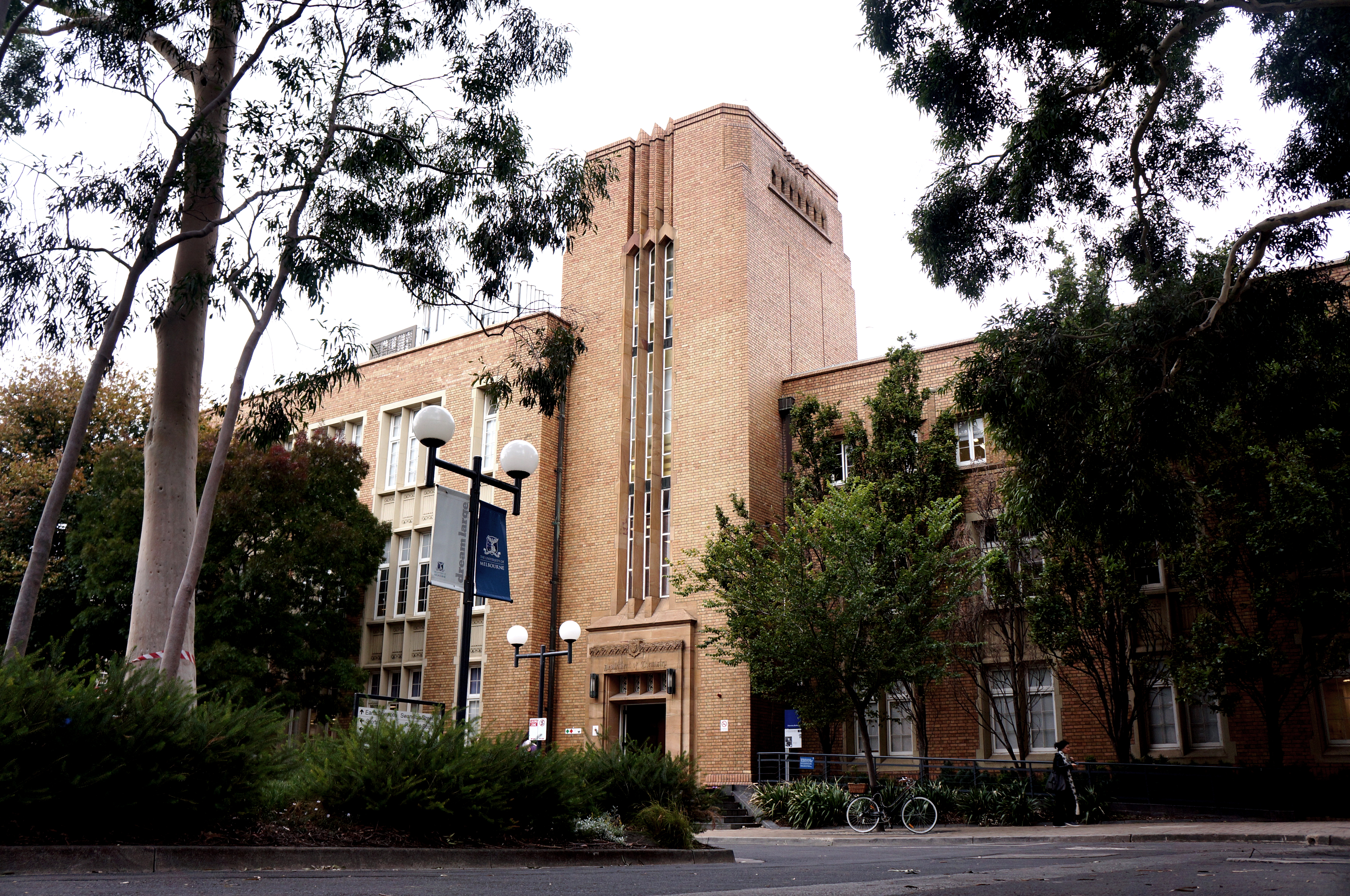
- Chemistry Building, entrance viewed from the north, May 2013
- Interactive map of the Chemistry Building area
- Alternative names: School of Chemistry Building; Building 134

General information
- Status: Completed
- Type: Academic administration
- Architectural style: Collegiate Gothic style; Victorian Academic Gothic
- Location: Masson Road, The University of Melbourne, Parkville Campus, Melbourne, Victoria, Australia
- Coordinates: 37°47′53″S 144°57′43″E
- Completed: 1938
- Owner: The University of Melbourne

Technical details
- Material: Cream brickwork
- Floor count: 2

Design and construction
- Architect: Percy Edgar Everett

Website
- www2.chemistry.unimelb.edu.au

The Chemistry Building is a university teaching facility used by the University's School of Chemistry, located at Masson Road, The University of Melbourne, Parkville Campus, Melbourne, Victoria, Australia. The building was designed by Percy Edgar Everett, who at the time was employed by the Victorian Public Works Department. It was built in 1938 at a time of major expansion at the University through the 1920s and 1930s.

The building is best described as a modernist, inter-war, gothic architecture, and due to this it has been deemed to be of state historical and architectural significance on the National Trust register.

== Description ==
The Chemistry Building is a distinctive modern interpretation of a Collegiate Gothic style. Its most notable features, which are stylistic of the inter-war period, are the cream brickwork, bold massing and highly detailed tower decoration. In recent years the Chemistry Building had interior redevelopments to bring the outdated technology and amenities up to the standard required for modern chemistry research.

== Key influence and design approach ==
During the 1930s when the building was constructed, Melbourne University placed a lot of importance on the opinions of experts such as chemists. For this reason, Ernst Johannes Hartung, a professor of chemistry at the time, designed most of the interior of the building to suit the specific requirements of chemistry research.

The Masson Theatre in the chemistry school has a heritage listing despite losing its impressive two-storey high rolling blackboards and theatre-wide front rostrum in the late 1980s. It has undergone a recent renovation addressing safety concerns but preserving the remaining character.

== Gallery ==
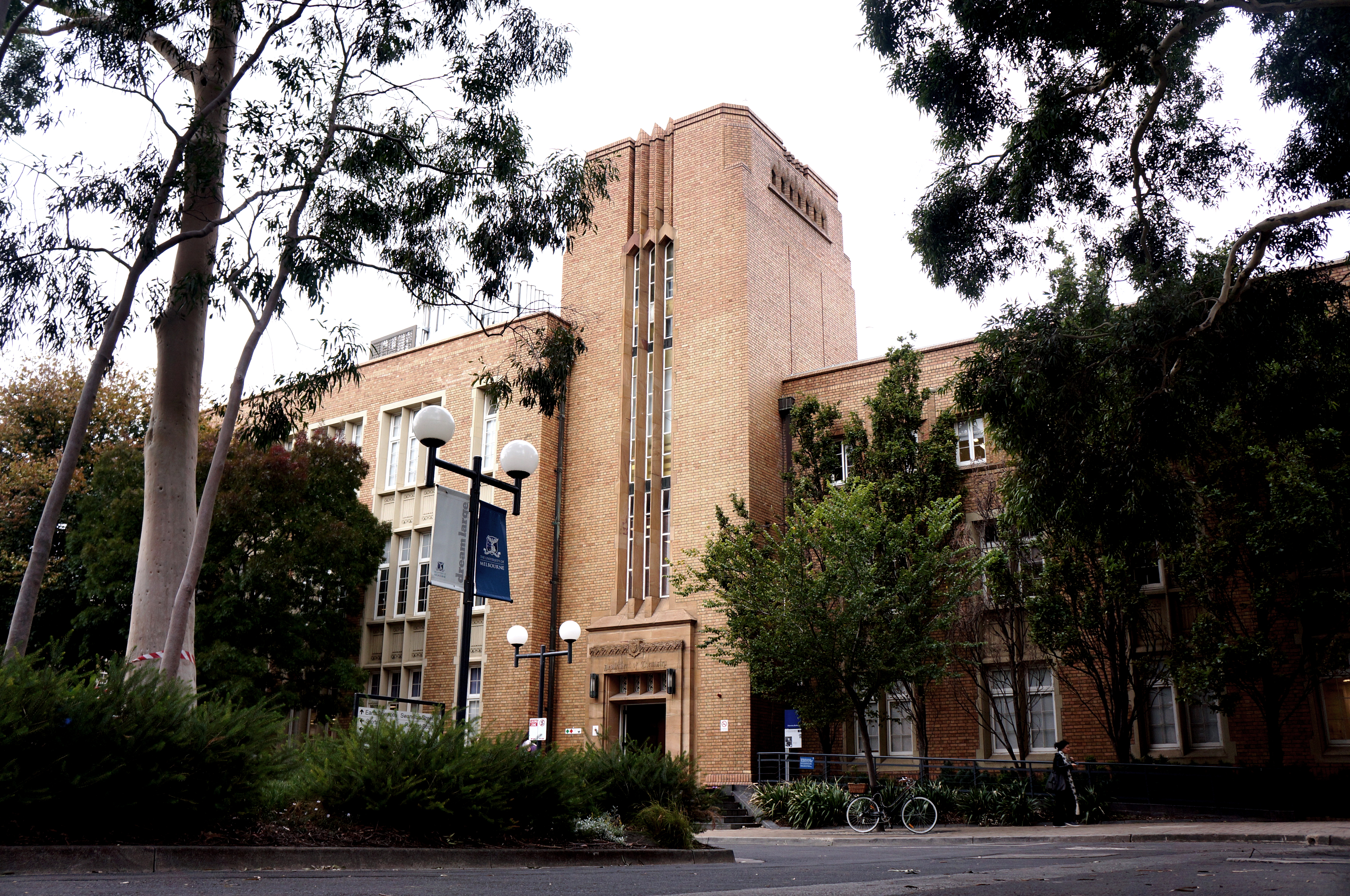
Entrance view (from north)

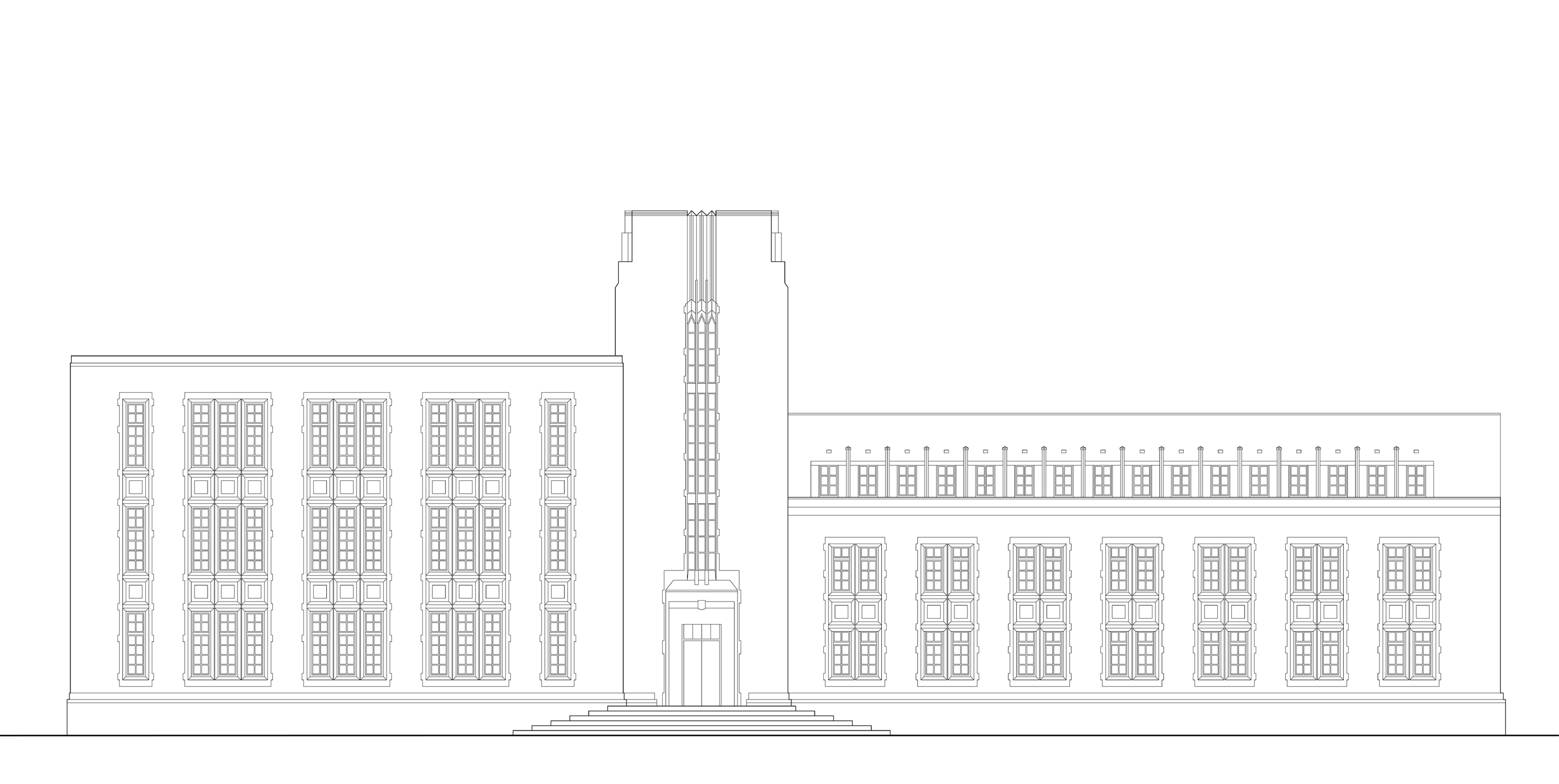
North elevation

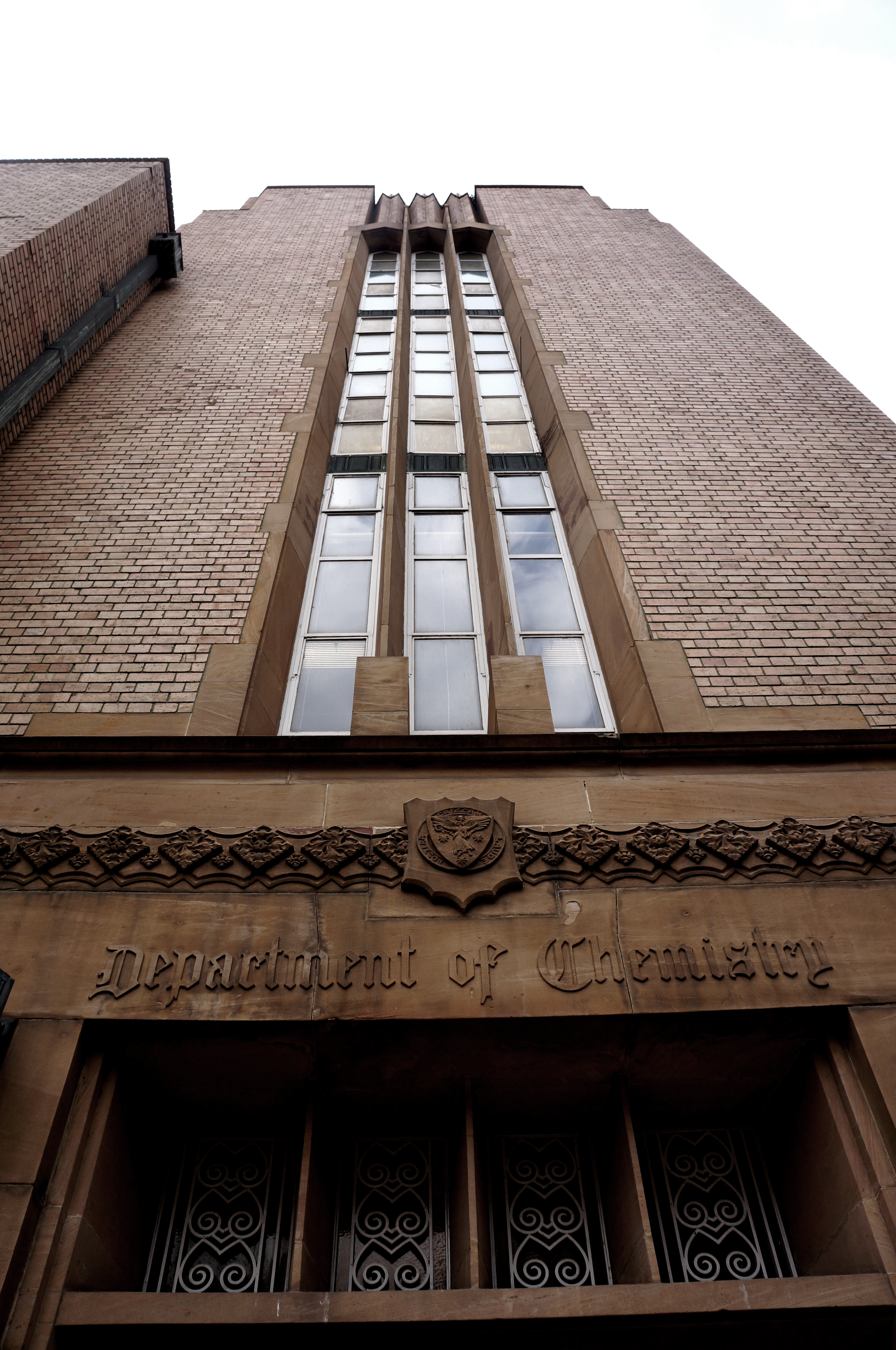
Close-up view of entrance

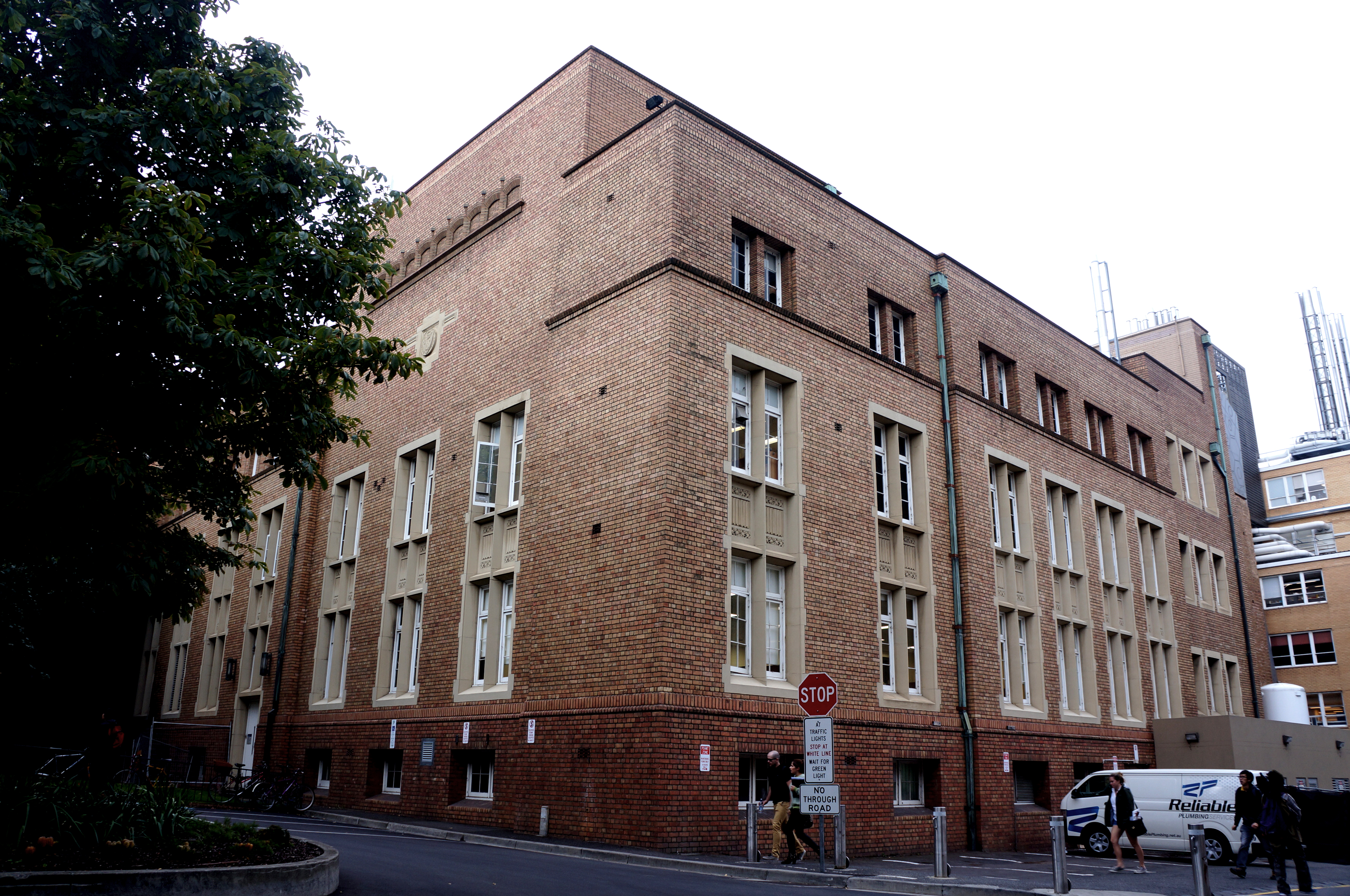
Southwest view

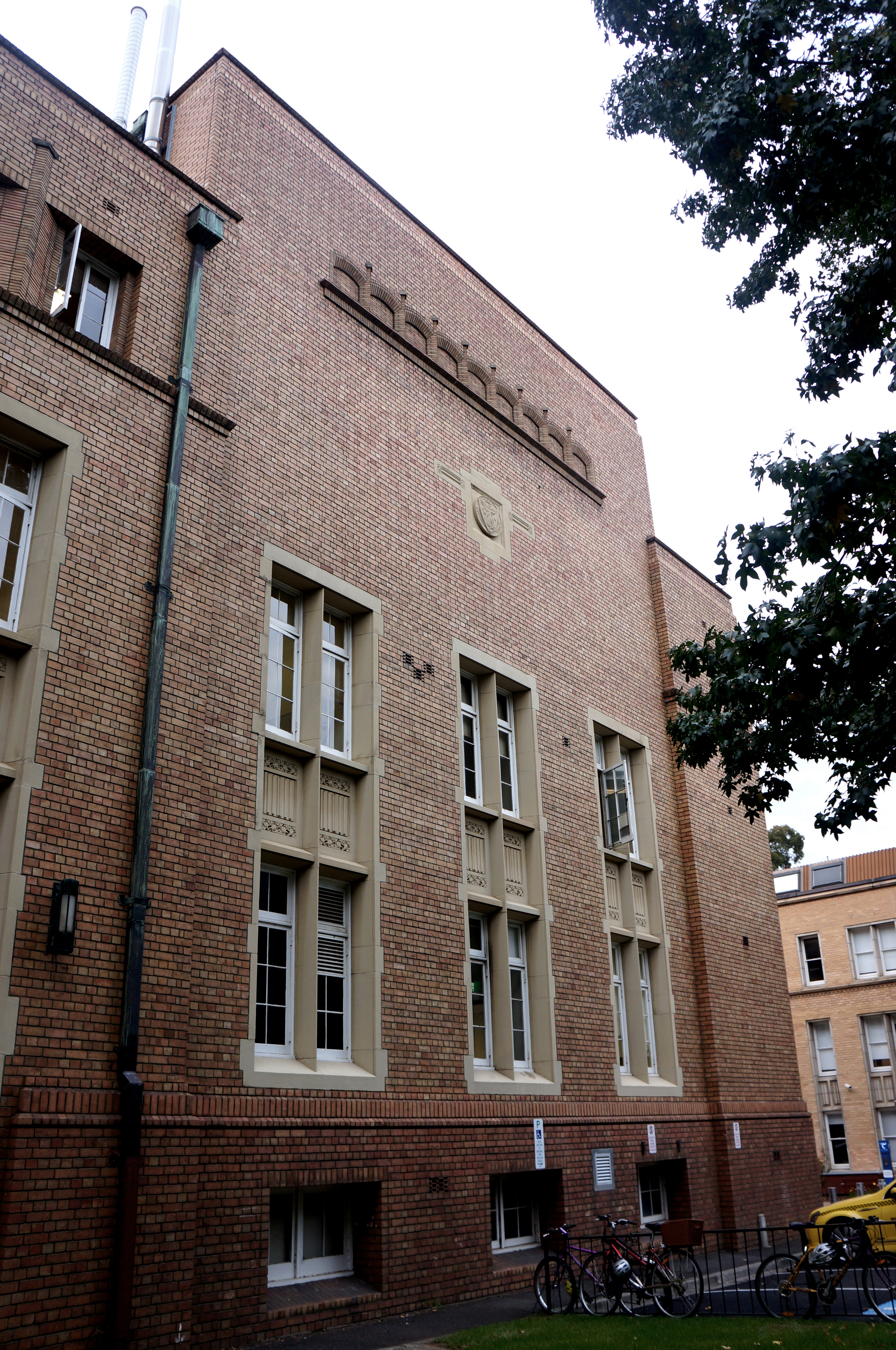
West view
