= Skouriotissa =

Skouriotissa: Σκουριώτισσα (Greek); Skuriotissa (Turkish)
- Village
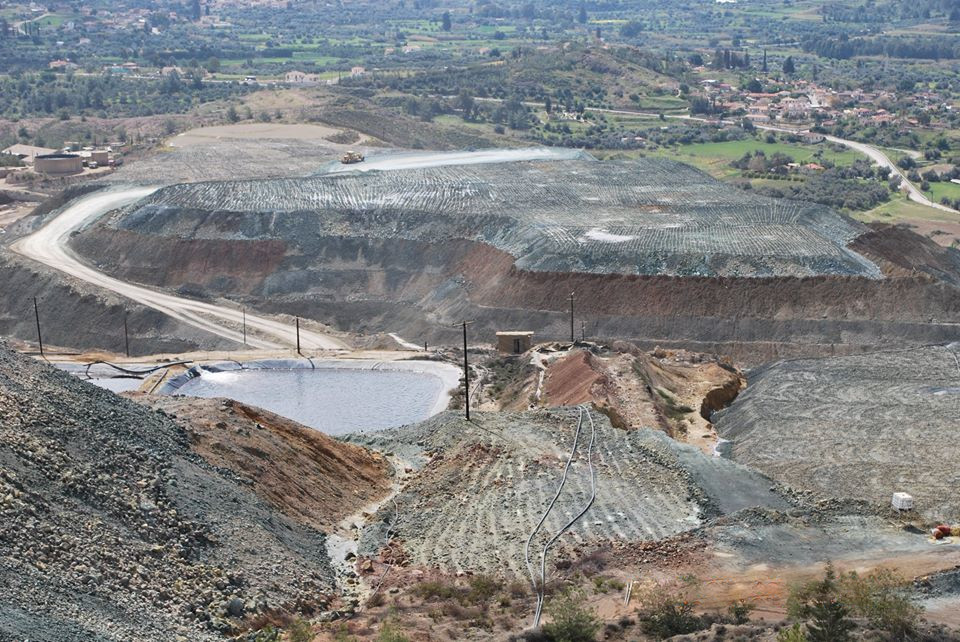
- Hydrometallurgical plant in Skouriotissa mines Cyprus

- Location in Cyprus
- Coordinates: 35°5′28″N 32°53′5″E
- Country: Cyprus
- District: Nicosia District

Population (2001)
  - Total: 8
- Time zone: UTC+2 (EET)
  - Summer (DST): UTC+3 (EEST)

Skouriotissa (Greek: Σκουριώτισσα; Turkish: Skuriotissa) is a village in the Nicosia District of Cyprus and the site of the former Skourotissa mines. Today the area is largely uninhabited with only 8 people remaining in the village.

As of 2011 the village houses the headquarters of Sector 1 of the UNFICYP mission. The headquarters are currently assigned to an infantry unit from Argentina who is lead nation in Sector 1.
