= Seeley G. Mudd =

American physician, academic, and philanthropist (1895–1968)

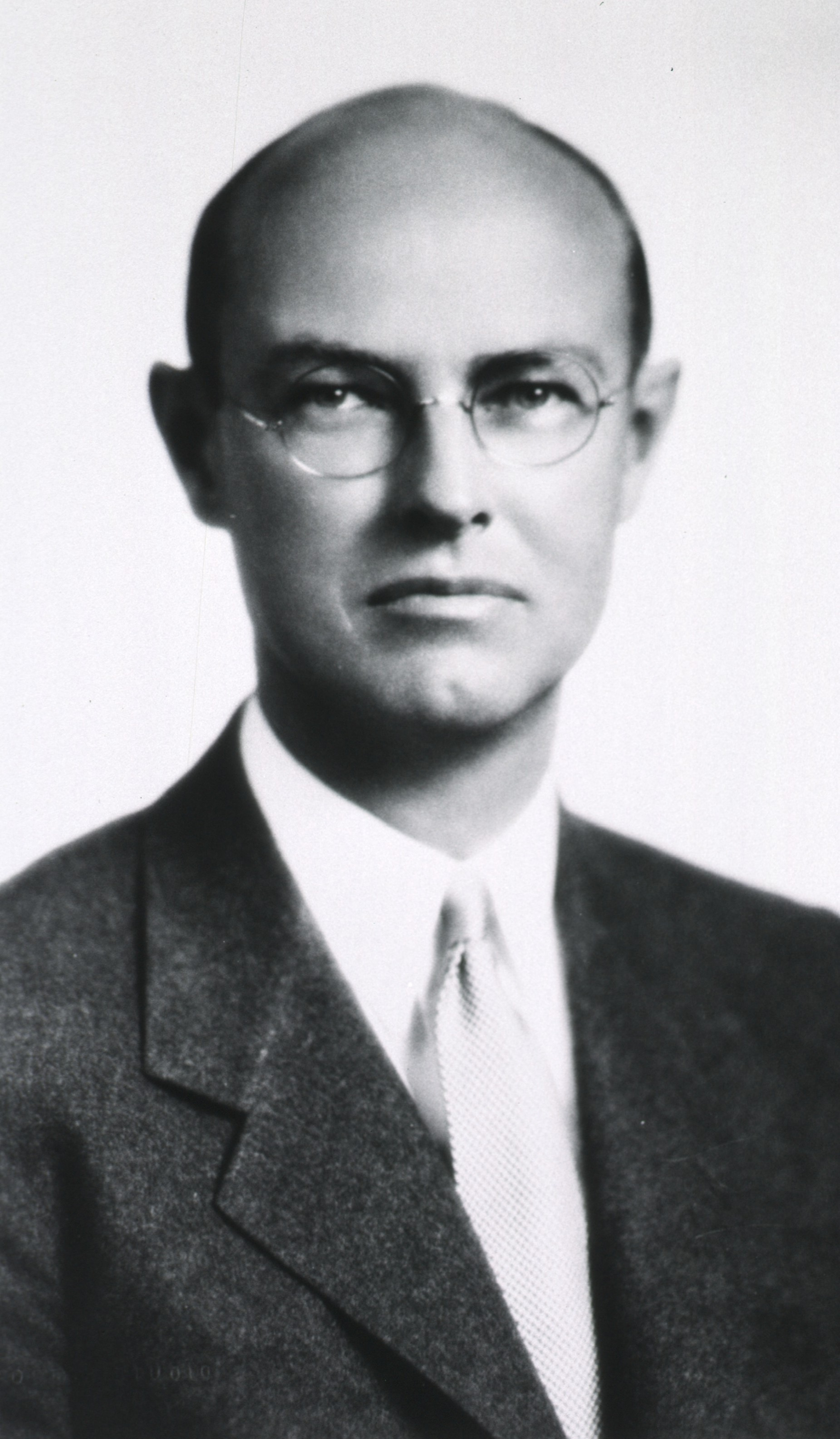
- Born: Seeley Greenleaf Mudd; April 18, 1895; Denver, Colorado, U.S.
- Died: March 10, 1968 (aged 72)
- Education: Columbia University (BA, BS); Harvard Medical School (MD)
- Occupations: physician, professor, philanthropist
- Parent(s): Seeley W. Mudd; Della Mullock Mudd
- Relatives: Harvey Seeley Mudd (brother); Henry T. Mudd (nephew); Caryll Mudd Sprague (niece); Norman F. Sprague, Jr. (nephew-in-law); Victoria Nebeker Coberly (niece-in-law)

Seeley Greenleaf Mudd, M.D. (April 18, 1895 – March 10, 1968) was an American physician, professor, and major philanthropist to academic institutions.

== Early life ==
Mudd was born in Denver, Colorado in 1895, and was the son of noted mining engineer Seeley W. Mudd and Della Mullock Mudd. His brother, Harvey Seeley Mudd, was a miner, businessman, and philanthropist. He was eight when his family moved to Los Angeles, California. He attended Stanford University for two years before transferring to Columbia University, where he received a B.A in 1917 and a B.S. degree in mining engineering. He later attended Harvard Medical School where he received his M.D. degree in 1924. Mudd also had relatives with the names of Andrew G. Mudd and Courtney R. Mudd.

== Career ==
Mudd practiced cardiology in Los Angeles, where he contributed briefly with Linus Pauling, before joining the faculty at the California Institute of Technology, where he did work on cancer research. He was later professor and dean at the Keck School of Medicine of the University of Southern California.

== Legacy ==
During his lifetime, Mudd contributed more than $10 million to private colleges and universities. Via his will, he created the Seeley G. Mudd Foundation to continue the work "that educational excellence be supported in the form of grants for the construction of buildings for teaching, learning, and research".

Many academic institutions have buildings named in honor of Mudd:

- Albion College: Seeley G. Mudd Learning Center
- Amherst College: The Seeley G. Mudd Building
- Caltech: The Seeley G. Mudd Building of Geophysics and Planetary Sciences ("South Mudd")
- Carleton College: Seeley G. Mudd Hall of Science, which housed the chemistry and geology departments
- Cate School: Seeley G. Mudd Math Classroom Building and Seeley G. Mudd Science Building
- Chadwick School: Seeley Mudd Science Building
- Claremont School of Theology: Seeley G. Mudd Theater
- Colby College: Seeley G. Mudd Science Building
- Cornell University: Mudd Hall, the center for Neurobiology and Behavior
- Denison University: Seeley G. Mudd Learning Center, addition to William Howard Doane Library
- University of Denver: Seeley G. Mudd Science building
- Duke University Medical Center: Seeley G. Mudd building
- Harvard Medical School: Seeley G. Mudd building
- Harvard-Westlake School: Seeley G. Mudd Library (the library for the school's Upper Campus)
- Howard University: College of Medicine's pre-clinical science facility
- Johns Hopkins University: Seeley G. Mudd Science building
- Lawrence University: Seeley G. Mudd Library
- Lehigh University: Seeley G. Mudd Building of Chemistry
- Massachusetts Institute of Technology: Seeley G. Mudd Building
- Northwestern University: Mudd Hall, containing the Mudd Library
- Oberlin College: Seeley G. Mudd Learning Center
- Pacific School of Religion: Seeley G. Mudd building
- Pitzer College: Seeley G. Mudd Library (now part of the Honnold/Mudd Library)
- Polytechnic School: Seeley G. Mudd Science building
- Pomona College: Seeley G. Mudd Science Library
- Princeton University: The Seeley G. Mudd Manuscript Library
- Rice University: Seeley G. Mudd Computer Science Laboratory
- University of Southern California: The psychology and chemistry buildings; the medical research building on the health sciences campus
- Stanford University: Seeley G. Mudd Chemistry Building
- Vassar College: Seeley G. Mudd Chemistry Building, built in 1984
- Washington University in St. Louis: Seeley G. Mudd House residence hall, as well as the former Seeley G. Mudd Hall for the School of Law (an award-winning building for its use of concrete that ultimately proved unpopular with the University community, demolished 25 years after its 1972 dedication)
- The Webb Schools: Seeley G. Mudd Auditorium, remodeled and renamed in 2013.
- Westridge School: Seeley G. Mudd Science Building
- Whitworth University: Seeley G. Mudd Chapel
- Willamette University: Seeley G. Mudd Building
- Yale University: Seeley G. Mudd Library

It is a common misconception that the Engineering building at Columbia University was also named for Seeley G. Mudd. It is, in fact, named for his father, Seeley Wintersmith Mudd.
