= Cyprus Mines Corporation =

Defunct American copper mining company

Coordinates: 35°08′20.02″N 32°50′20.68″E

- Type: Private
- Industry: nonferrous metals
- Founded: 1916
- Defunct: 1993
- Fate: Merged with Climax Molybdenum Company
- Successor: Cyprus Amax Minerals

The Cyprus Mines Corporation was an early twentieth century American mining company based in Cyprus. In 1914, Charles G. Gunther began prospecting in the Skouriotissa area after reading in ancient books that the island was rich in copper and noticing promising ancient Roman slag heaps in the area. The company was established in 1916 by Colonel Seeley W. Mudd, his son, Harvey Seeley Mudd, and mining engineer/business partner, Philip Wiseman, whose family, along with the Mudds, were the primary owners of Cyprus Mines until the early 1970s when it was sold to Amoco.

== History ==
Harvey S. Mudd, co-founder & president, Cyprus Mines Corporation

Initially the mine struggled, but eventually obstacles were overcome and the mine produced money. Turkish and Greek Cypriots were hired, and the town of Skouriotissa became a hub as many miners moved there. The corporation took an old-style, paternalistic attitude towards workers, building a company town around the mine. Harvey Seeley Mudd claimed his experience with the Cyprus Mines Corporation influenced him to push the study of humanities in the engineering college he started, Harvey Mudd College. The Cyprus Mines Corporation provided copper to Nazi Germany right up until the start of the World War II. Although the company knew that some of its copper sales to Germany would be used to produce weapons for the Nazi military, at a time before the war when Germany traded for resources with many countries, the owner of the mine argued that stopping those exports would have adversely affected Cyprus. David Sievert Lavender (1962). The story of the Cyprus Mines Corporation. San Marino, CA: Huntington Library. p. 264. LCCN 61014054. They were, however, disturbed by Hitler's policy of Jewish persecution, and in late 1938, CMC established a relief fund along with their agent to help former business associates get out of Germany.

Long strikes took place in 1948, organized by the Pancyprian Federation of Labour and the Turkish Cypriot trade unions. After extending the initial five-day strike, the union asked for government intervention. The government declared that they could not start an inquiry since wages were not substandard. By 1955, the company's copper mines on Cyprus had become the island's largest industry, exporting nearly a million tons of copper a year. Mudd's copper mines on Cyprus supported 2,000 of the island's inhabitants and provided more than 25 percent of the island's entire annual revenue. Cyprus Mines paid its employees 15–20 percent above the island average. The company ran an up-to-date, 65-bed hospital for its employees; built scores of low-cost houses for them to live in; and helped to run schools, sports clubs, welfare centers, and summer camps for their families. One of the operating mines and the company's processing plant fell north of the cease-fire line in Northern Cyprus following the Turkish invasion of Cyprus in 1974, while the rest of the company's mines were on the other side of the Green Line. Given this insurmountable problem, the Cyprus Mines Corporation pulled out of Cyprus and the Mavrovouni mine and processing plant remained in an area not controlled by the government of the Republic of Cyprus.

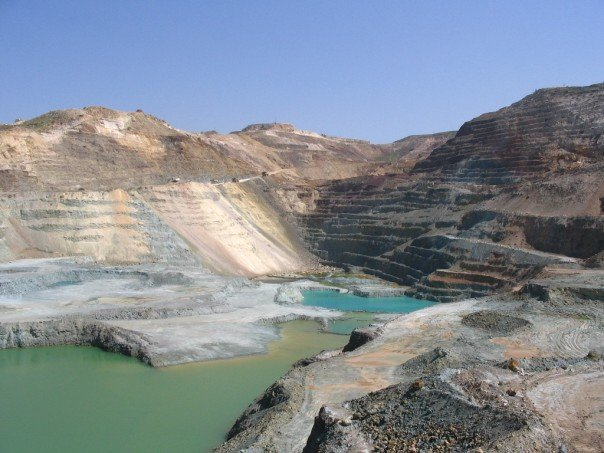
Skouriotissa Copper Mine in Cyprus

=== List of Cyprus Mines ===
Over 30 copper deposits, ranging in size from 50,000 to over 20,000,000 tonnes, with grades from 0.3 to 4.5 percent copper have been discovered with most of the mining activity been centered on the following districts:

- Skouriotissa (the oldest operating mine in the world)
- Tamassos
- Kambia
- Kalavassos
- Limni

A few isolated deposits have also been found at Troulli Mine (Larnaca), Mangaleni (Limassol), Peravasa (Limassol) and Vretchia (Paphos).

=== Tailings ===
As in most mines, the tailings, waste left over from processing ore, are a problem, although in Cyprus' case they were also a boon. The discovery and analysis of copper tailings left on Cyprus by Romans had been important factors in the founding of the company and the modern economic development of Cyprus. As of 2006, there are no plans to clean up the tailings. As the company did while it operated, Cyprus prefers to retain the past economic benefits of mining without spending funds on environmental remediation, particularly with no more income from the mines nor the use of the polluted land surrounding those mines, asserting that modern Cyprus has no way to pay for the cleanup. Local farmers claim that citrus crop yields have been reduced by contaminated dust blowing in. Studies of local fruit have found high heavy metal levels and decreased fruit size and quality. The effect of the mine is a growing issue for Cypriot environmentalists and NGOs.

=== Emissions ===
According to the Climate Accountability Institute, Cyprus Amax was responsible for 0.1% of global industrial greenhouse gas emissions up to 2017.

== Mergers and acquisitions ==
In 1979 Cyprus Mines Corporation was acquired by Amoco Corporation. Amoco expanded Cyprus into a diversified worldwide mining company. Amoco spun off Cyprus Minerals Company in 1985. In 1986, Cyprus acquired the Sierrita copper and molybdenum mine near Tucson, Arizona. In July 1988, Cyprus Minerals bought the Inspiration mine and smelting complex in Miami, Arizona. With the expiry of an agreement to purchase electricity at a favorable rate from the Salt River Project, Cyprus Minerals installed an ISASMELT furnace in its copper smelter. This was the first large-scale installation of the ISASMELT process, which was developed jointly by Mount Isa Mines Limited and the Australian government's Commonwealth Scientific and Industrial Research Organisation ("CSIRO"). In 1993, AMAX merged with the Cyprus Minerals Company to form Cyprus Amax Minerals Company. Cyprus-Amax was the world's leading producer of molybdenum and lithium, and a leading producer of copper and coal. The company had operations in 24 states and on six continents. In late 1999, Cyprus Amax Minerals was acquired by Phelps Dodge Corporation, which in turn was acquired by Freeport-McMoRan (NYSE: FCX) in 2007, forming the world's largest copper producer.
