= Seeley W. Mudd =

American mining engineer

- Born: Seeley Wintersmith Mudd; August 16, 1861; Kirkwood, Missouri, U.S.
- Died: 1926 (aged 64–65)
- Occupation: mining engineer
- Spouse: Della Mullock Mudd
- Children: Harvey Seeley Mudd; Seeley G. Mudd
- Relatives: Norman F. Sprague, Jr. (grandson-in-law); Henry T. Mudd (grandson); Victoria Nebeker Coberly (granddaughter-in-law); Caryll Mudd Sprague (granddaughter)

Seeley Wintersmith Mudd (1861–1926) was an American mining engineer.

== Biography ==
=== Early life ===
He was born in Kirkwood, a suburb of St. Louis, Missouri on August 16, 1861. He attended Washington University in St. Louis, where he graduated in 1883 with a degree in mining engineering.

=== Career ===
In December 1885, he moved to Leadville, Colorado, to work at the Small Hopes silver mine, then in Bonanza. He worked his way up from assayer to become the mine’s manager in 1888. While managing the Small Hopes mine he also leased other Leadville properties which provided him a modicum of financial independence.

In 1901, he and his family (wife Della Mullock and sons Harvey S. Mudd and Seeley G. Mudd) moved to Los Angeles, California, where he worked as a consulting engineer for the Guggenheim Exploration Company. He acquired his first major capital by choosing to receive a percent of the findings instead of a fixed salary. In 1907 he started up the Ray copper mine in Arizona, one of the first large scale porphyry copper operations. By the time of his death, Ray Consolidated Copper Company had produced 200 million dollars' worth of copper. It is still in production.

Also in Arizona, he and Ray Con partner Philip Wiseman took a wildcat speculation on the United Eastern mine in the Oatman district. When they hit high grade ore in 1916 they caused one of the last of the desert country gold rushes. The high grade ore deposit proved Arizona's richest and provided the partners with a quick but short-lived profit.

In early 1914, just before World War I, he partnered with Charles Godfrey Gunther and Philip Wiseman for a drilling opportunity in the island of Cyprus, where evidence of Roman and Phoenician mining of Copper ore had been found. After obtaining permission from the British government, which was ruling Cyprus at the time, Cyprus Mines Corporation was formally launched and in March 1916 and shares of stock authorized. As detailed in his "The Story of Cyprus Mines Corporation," David Lavender credits Seeley with the creation of the company but his son Harvey Seeley Mudd with bringing in the overwhelming success and profits of this multi-national corporation.

During World War I, Seeley Mudd applied for a commission in the Engineer Officers Reserve Corps, and on February 12, 1917, he received his commission as a Major. In 1918 he became a Colonel in the U.S. Army. He served as one of the government's dollar a year men, helping upgrade munitions production for the War Department.

Seeley W. Mudd died in St. Louis on May 24, 1926. He was an advocate for education and, among other gifts in his will, provided one million dollars for the Claremont College in Pomona, California, where he had been chairman of its board. His sons would follow in his philanthropic footsteps.

=== Legacy ===
The Engineering building at Columbia University was named in his honor, as was the School of Philosophy building at the University of Southern California and the Laboratory of the Geological Sciences ("North Mudd") at the California Institute of Technology.
