= Harvey Mudd College =

Private liberal arts college in Claremont, California, US

Coordinates: 34.10608°N 117.70919°W

- Type: Private liberal arts college
- Established: 1955; 71 years ago
- Academic affiliations: Claremont Colleges; NAICU; Oberlin Group; Annapolis Group; CLAC
- Endowment: $454.55 million (2024)
- President: Harriet Nembhard
- Faculty: 130 (2021)
- Undergraduates: 905 (2021)
- Location: Claremont, California, U.S.
- Campus: Suburban, 38 acres (15 ha)
- Colors: Black & gold
- Nickname: Stags (men) / Athenas (women)
- Sporting affiliations: NCAA Division III – SCIAC
- Mascots: Official: Men's, Stag; Women's, Athenas; Unofficial: Wally the Wart
- Website: www.hmc.edu

Harvey Mudd College (HMC) is a private liberal arts college in Claremont, California, focused on science and engineering. It is part of the Claremont Colleges, which share adjoining campus grounds and resources. The college enrolled 913 undergraduate students as of 2025 and awards the Bachelor of Science degree.

The college was funded by the friends and family of Harvey Seeley Mudd, one of the initial investors in the Cyprus Mines Corporation. Although involved in the planning of the new institution, Mudd died before it opened in 1955. The campus was designed by Edward Durell Stone in a New Formalist style.

== History ==
Harvey Mudd College was founded in 1955, funded by $2 million from the estate of Harvey Seeley Mudd. Classes began in 1957 with a class of 48 students, 7 faculty, and one building–Mildred E. Mudd Hall, a dormitory. Classes and meals took place at Claremont Men's College (Claremont McKenna College), and labs in the Baxter Science Building until additional buildings could be built: Jacobs Science Building (1959), Thomas-Garett Hall (1961) and Platt Campus Center (1963). By 1966, the campus had grown to 283 students and 43 faculty. While created as a science and engineering college, it was mandated that 35% of a student's education was in humanities.

Under the presidency of Maria Klawe as of 2006, Harvey Mudd became a leading advocate for women in STEM in higher education.

In April 2017, all classes were cancelled for two days in response to tensions on campus over workload, race issues, and mistrust of faculty. Contributing events included the deaths of two Mudd students and a Scripps student that year and the leak of the Wabash Report on teaching, learning, and workload at Mudd.

On July 1, 2023, Harriet Nembhard became the sixth President of Harvey Mudd College.

== Campus ==
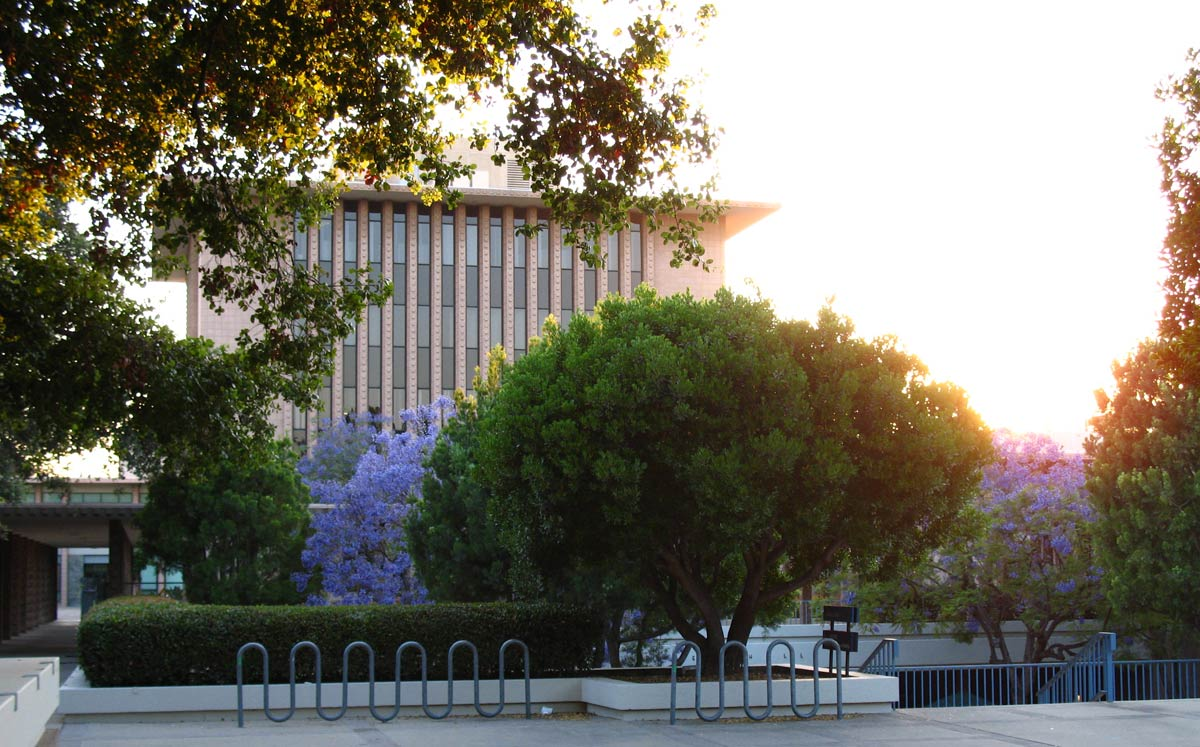
The former Norman F. Sprague Memorial Library

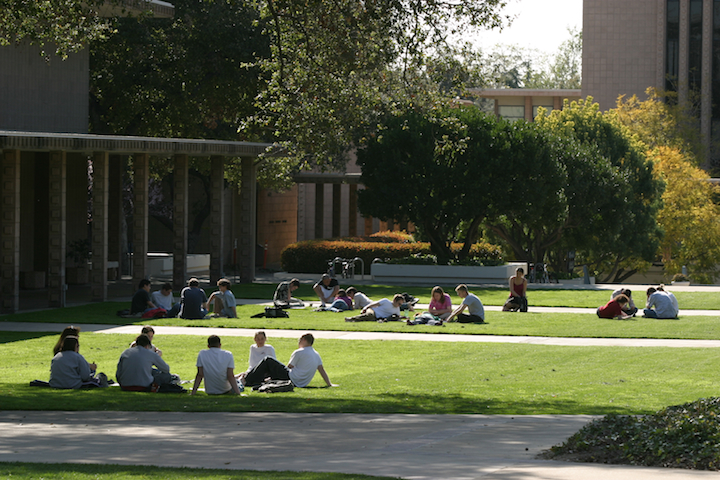
Outdoor classes at Harvey Mudd

The original buildings of the campus, designed by Edward Durell Stone and completed in 1959, feature "knobbly concrete squares that students of Harvey Mudd affectionately call "warts" and use as hooks for skateboards." The school's unofficial mascot "Wally the Wart" is an anthropomorphic concrete wart.

In 2013, Travel and Leisure named the college as one of "America's ugliest college campuses" and noted that while Stone regarded his design as a "Modernist masterpiece", the result was "layering drab, slab-sided buildings with Beaux-Arts decoration."

=== Academic buildings ===
The official names for the academic buildings of Harvey Mudd College are:

- F.W. Olin Science Center ("Olin") - 1992
- Parsons Engineering Building ("Parsons") - 1972
- R. Michael Shanahan Center for Teaching and Learning ("Shan") - 2013
- Jacobs Science Center ("Jacobs") - 1959
- W.M. Keck Laboratories ("Keck")
- Scott A. McGregor Computer Science Center ("Greg") - 2021

=== Dormitories ===
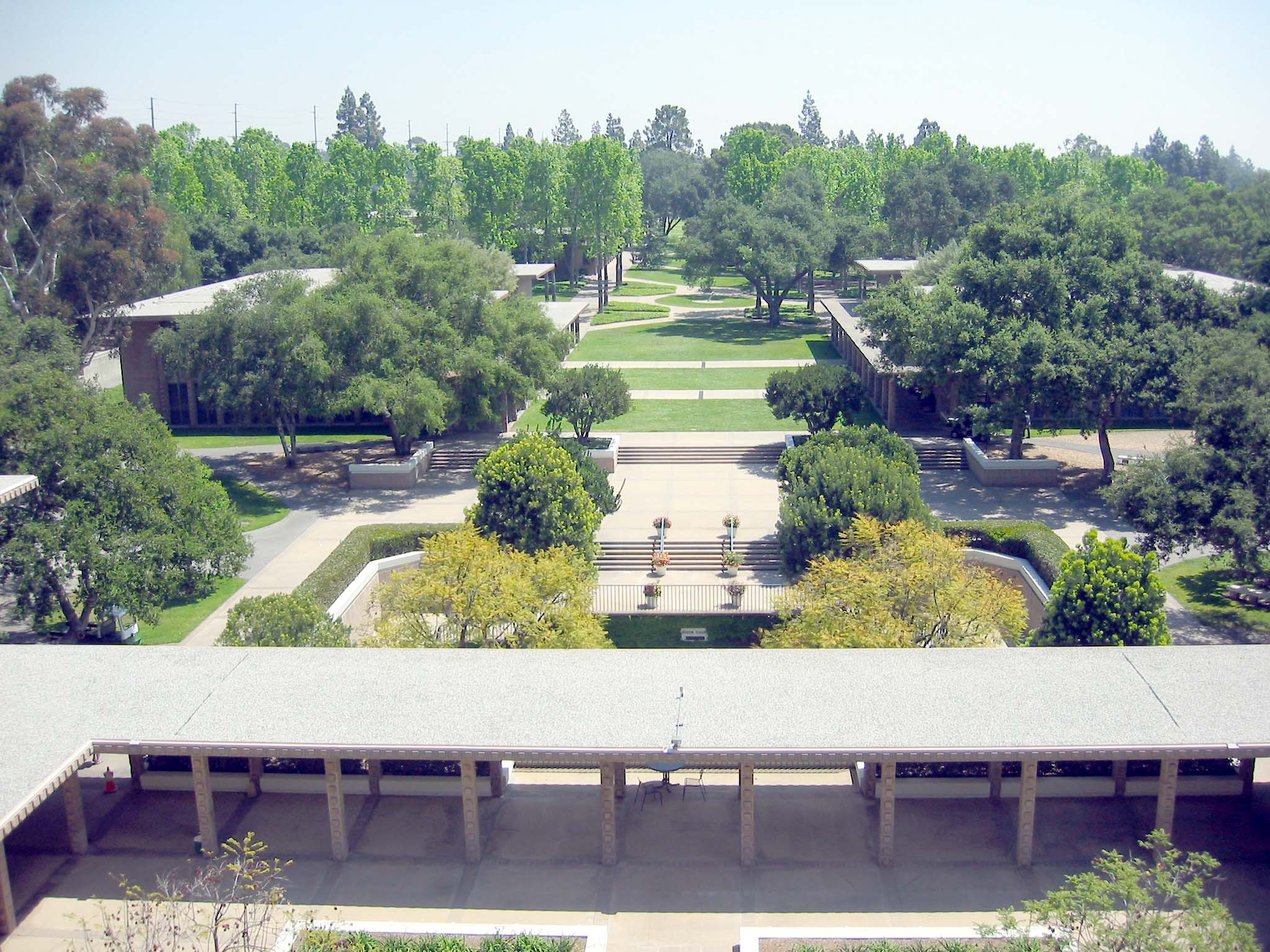
View of central campus, looking out of the former Norman F. Sprague Memorial Library

The official names for the dormitories of Harvey Mudd College are (listed in order of construction):

- Mildred E. Mudd Hall ("East") - 1957
- West Hall ("West") - 1958
- North Hall ("North") - 1959
- Marks Residence Hall ("South") - 1968
- J. L. Atwood Residence Hall ("Atwood") - 1981
- Case Residence Hall ("Case") - 1985
- Ronald and Maxine Linde Residence Hall ("Linde") - 1993
- Frederick and Susan Sontag Residence Hall ("Sontag") - 2004
- Wayne and Julie Drinkward Residence Hall ("Drinkward") - 2015
- Garrett House - completed in 1959 as the president's house, converted to a dorm in 2023

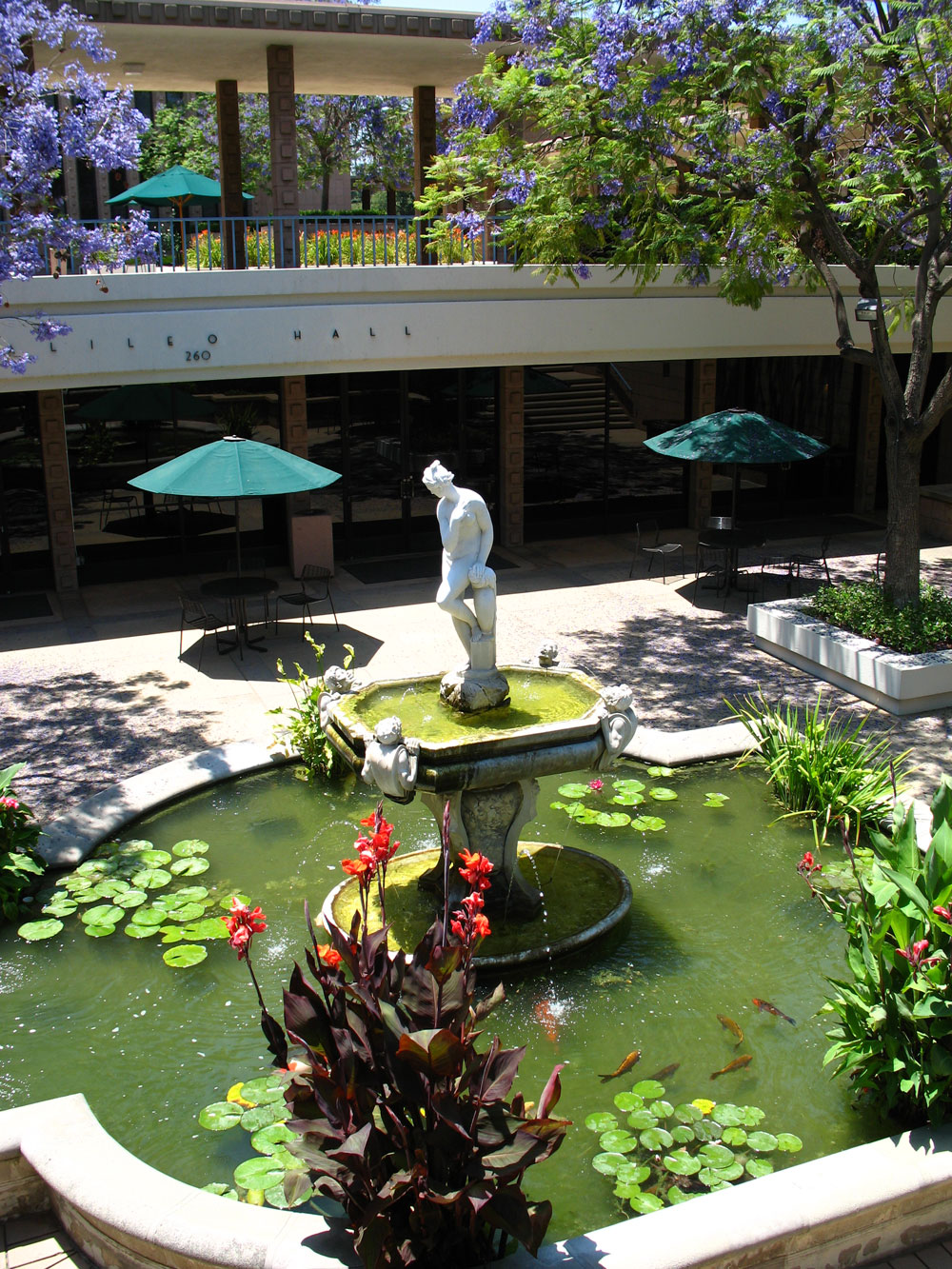
Galileo Hall and Hixon Courtyard

Until the addition of the Linde and Sontag dorms, Atwood and Case dorms were occasionally referred to as New Dorm and New Dorm II; Mildred E. Mudd Hall and Marks Hall are almost invariably referred to as East Dorm and South Dorm.

During the construction of Case Dorm some students decided as a prank to move all of the survey stakes exactly six inches in one direction.

"East" was the first dorm, but it wasn't until "West" was built west of it that it was actually referred to as "East". Then, "North" was built, directly north of "East". When the fourth dorm, Marks Hall, was built, there was one corner of the quad available (the northwest) and one directional name, "South", remaining. To this day, "South" dorm is the northernmost HMC inner dorm.

The fifth, sixth, seventh, eighth, and ninth dorms built are Atwood, Case, Linde, Sontag, and Drinkward, respectively. They were initially referred to as "the colonies" by some students, a reference to the fact that they were newer and at the farthest end of the campus; these dorms are now more commonly referred to as "the outer dorms", with the four directional dorms referred to as "the inner dorms". The college had initially purchased an apartment building adjacent to the newer dorms to house additional students, but it was demolished to make room for Sontag.

Since any HMC student, regardless of class year, can live in any of the dormitories, several of the dorms have accumulated long-standing traditions and so-called "personalities".

== Academics ==
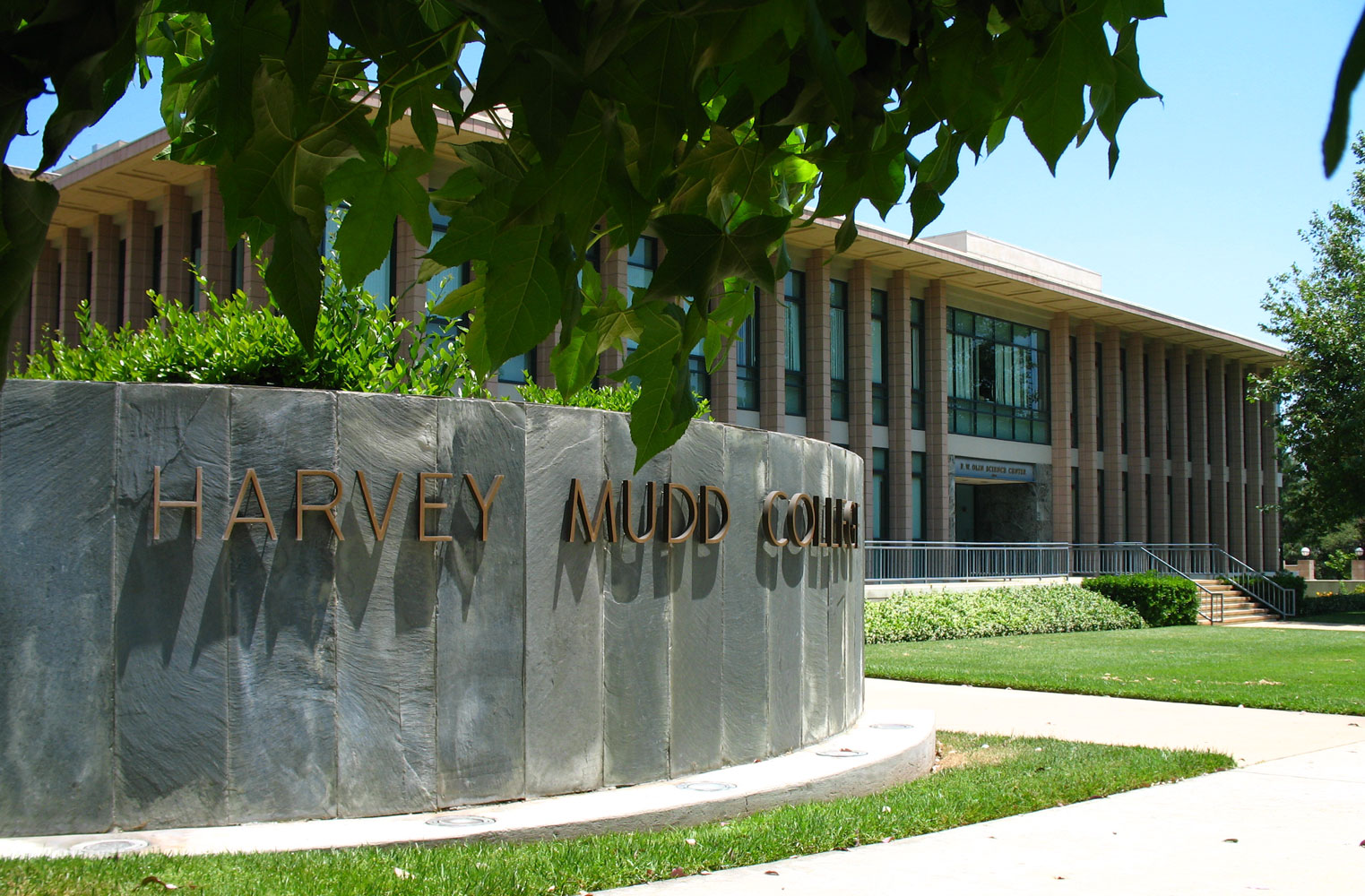
Harvey Mudd College entrance on Dartmouth Ave.

HMC offers four-year degrees in chemistry, mathematics, physics, computer science, biology, and engineering, interdisciplinary degrees in mathematical and computational biology, and joint majors in computer science and mathematics; computer science and physics; physics and mathematics; biology and chemistry; biology and climate; computer science and climate; and chemistry and climate. Students may also elect an Individual Program of Study (IPS) or an off-campus major offered by any of the other Claremont Colleges, provided one also completes a minor in one of the technical fields that Harvey Mudd offers as a major. The college maintains an intense academic culture.

All HMC students are required to take the college's Common Core Curriculum, typically throughout their freshman and sophomore years. This includes courses in computer science, engineering, biology, chemistry, physics, mathematics, writing, a critical inquiry course, and a social impact course.

Its most popular majors, by 2025 graduates, were:

1. Engineering (66)
2. Computer Science (54)
3. Computer Science & Mathematics (54)

In 2018, the Chronicle of Higher Education reported that in response to student "complaints first to mental-health counsellors and then to outside evaluators," the college was "considering how to ease pressure on students without sacrificing rigour."

=== Admissions ===
For the class of 2026, the college received 4,440 applications and admitted 593 applicants (a 13.4% acceptance rate). Of the 237 freshmen who enrolled, the middle 50% of SAT scores reported were 760–790 in mathematics and 720–770 in reading and writing, while the ACT Composite range was 34–36.

Harvey Mudd, along with Wake Forest University, long held out as the last four-year colleges or universities in the U.S. to accept only SAT and not ACT test scores for admission. In August 2007, at the beginning of the application process for the class of 2012, HMC began accepting ACT results, a year after Wake Forest abandoned its former SAT-only policy.

Due to the COVID-19 pandemic, Harvey Mudd waived the requirement for SAT or ACT scores for the graduating classes of 2021 or 2022. This policy was extended to the 2026 admissions cycle.

The college is need-blind for domestic applicants.

=== Rankings ===
Academic rankings

Liberal arts
- U.S. News & World Report: 10
- Washington Monthly: 2

National
- Forbes: 84
- WSJ/College Pulse: 15

Washington Monthly ranked Harvey Mudd second in 2024 among 194 liberal arts colleges in the U.S. based on its contribution to the public good, as measured by social mobility, research, and promoting public service. Money magazine ranked Harvey Mudd 136th out of 744 in its "Best Colleges For Your Money 2019" report.

In U.S. News & World Report's 2025 "America's Best Colleges" report, Harvey Mudd College is tied for the 12th best U.S. liberal arts college, and is third among undergraduate engineering schools in the U.S. whose highest degree is a Master's. Forbes in 2019 rated it 23rd in its "America's Top Colleges" ranking of 650 military academies, national universities and liberal arts colleges.

Harvey Mudd is ranked 1st nationally for Return on Investment for Students by PayScale's 2024 rankings.

== Tuition and other costs ==
For the 2024–25 academic year, Harvey Mudd's total annual cost of attendance (tuition, fees, and room and board) was $93,131. About 70% of freshmen receive financial aid.

== Student life ==
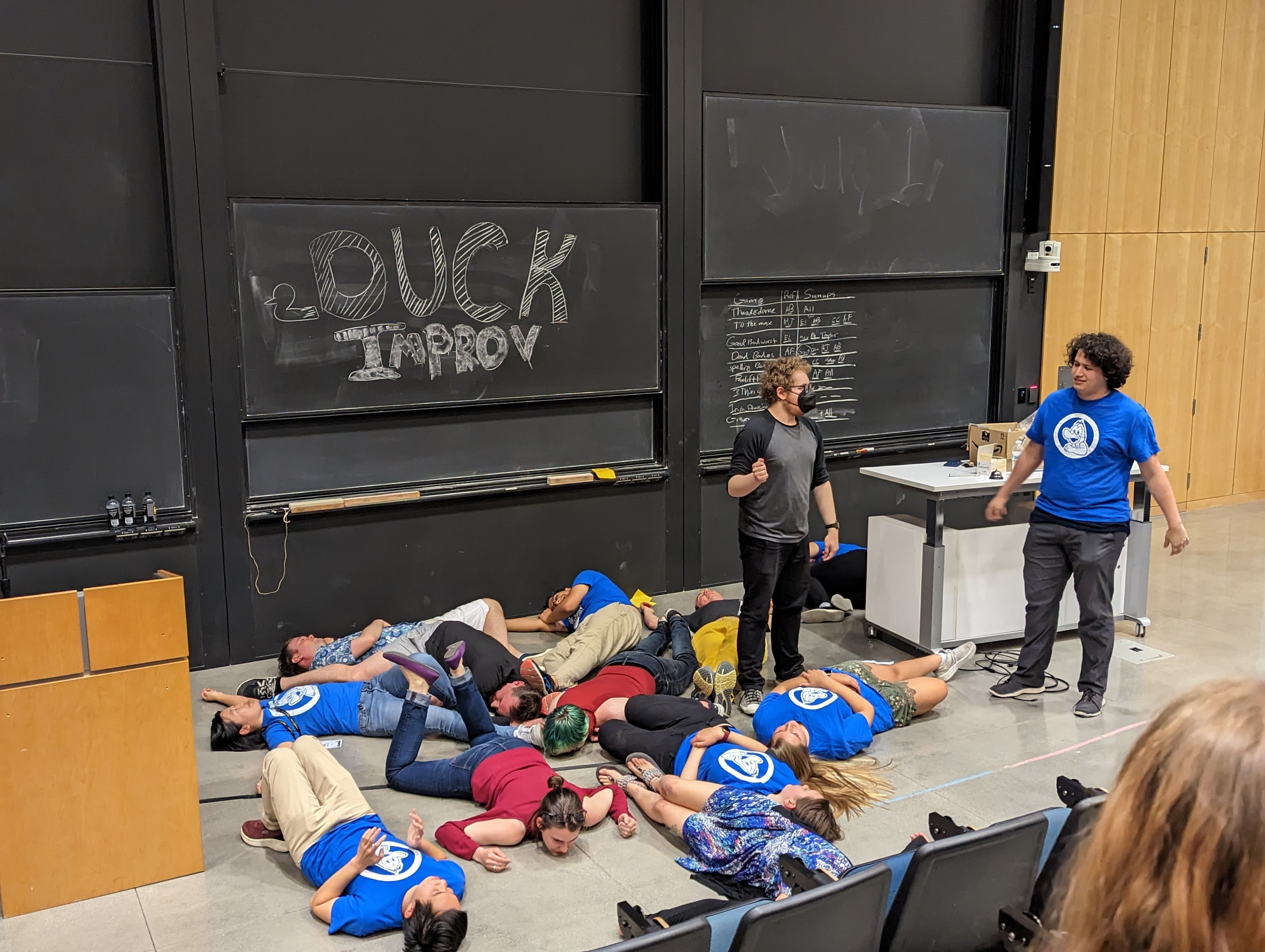
An improv show by Harvey Mudd's "Duck!"

=== Athletics ===
Athletes from Harvey Mudd compete alongside athletes from Claremont McKenna College and Scripps College as the Claremont-Mudd-Scripps Stags and Athenas (CMS). The teams participate in NCAA Division III in the Southern California Intercollegiate Athletic Conference (SCIAC). The mascot for the men's teams is Stanley the Stag, and the women's teams are the Athenas. Their colours are cardinal and gold.

According to the Division III Fall Learfield Director's Cup Standings for the 2016–2017 year, CMS ranks 12th among all Division III programs, and first among SCIAC colleges.

The other sports combination of the Claremont Colleges, and CMS' primary rival, is the team made up of Pomona College and Pitzer College known as the Pomona–Pitzer Sagehens (PP). This is known to students as the Sixth Street Rivalry.

==== Athletic facilities ====
- Baseball — Bill Arce Field
- Basketball and Volleyball — Roberts Pavilion
- Football and Lacrosse — John Zinda Field
- Softball — Softball Field
- Soccer — John Pritzlaff Field
- Aquatics — Matt M. Axelrood Pool
- Tennis — Biszantz Family Tennis Center
- Track and Field — Burns Track Complex

=== Relations with Caltech ===
The California Institute of Technology (Caltech), another university with strength in the natural sciences and engineering, is located 26 miles (42 km) away from Harvey Mudd College. Mudders occasionally amuse themselves by pranking Caltech. For example, in 1986, students from Mudd stole a memorial cannon from Fleming House at Caltech (originally from the National Guard) by dressing as maintenance people and carting it off on a flatbed truck for "cleaning". The students eventually returned the cannon after Caltech threatened to take legal action. In 2006, Massachusetts Institute of Technology (MIT) replicated the prank and moved the same cannon to their campus in Cambridge, Massachusetts.

== Notable alumni ==
Notable Harvey Mudd College alumni include:

- Donald D. Chamberlin, co-inventor of SQL
- Jonathan Gay (1989), creator of Adobe Flash software
- Jennifer Holmgren, CEO of LanzaTech
- Richard H. Jones, diplomat, U.S. ambassador to Israel
- Stan Love, astronaut
- George "Pinky" Nelson, astronaut
- Sean "Day9" Plott, esports commentator and game designer
- Tom Preston-Werner (dropped out), co-founder of GitHub, creator of Gravatar

== List of presidents ==
The following person served as president of Harvey Mudd College:

#	Image	Name	Term start	Term end	Ref.
1		Joseph Platt	1955	1976	
2		D. Kenneth Baker	1976	June 30, 1988	
3		Henry E. Riggs	July 1, 1988	February 28, 1997	
4		Jon C. Strauss	March 1, 1997	June 30, 2006	
5		Maria Klawe	July 1, 2006	June 30, 2023	
6		Harriet Nembhard	July 1, 2023	present	

== See also ==
- Association of Independent Technological Universities

== Bibliography ==
- Platt, Joseph B. (1994). Harvey Mudd College: The First Twenty Years. Santa Barbara, California: Fithian Press. ISBN 978-1-56474-100-4.
