= 2010 in Cyprus =

- Decades: 1990s; 2000s; 2010s; 2020s
- See also: Other events of 2010; Timeline of Cypriot history

Events in the year 2010 in Cyprus.

== Incumbents ==
- President: Demetris Christofias
- President of the Parliament: Marios Garoyian

== Events ==
Ongoing – Cyprus dispute

- 1 February – United Nations Secretary-General Ban Ki-moon arrives in the country to begin talks aimed at reuniting the island.
- 8 March – The body of former President Tassos Papadopoulos, which had been stolen in December 2009, is found at a cemetery in Nicosia.
- 10 March – Three men are detained in relation to the theft of the corpse of former Cypriot President Tassos Papadopoulos.
- 19 April – Derviş Eroğlu, head of a party opposed to reunification of Cyprus, wins leadership elections in the Turkish Cypriot north but pledges talks with Greek Cypriots.
- 27 May – Israel summons the ambassador of Cyprus and other European countries to protest the expedition as an unnecessary provocation after eight ships, including four cargo vessels and a Turkish passenger ferry carrying 600 people, including a Nobel peace laureate and former U.S. congresswoman, set sail for Gaza with 10,000 tons of humanitarian aid to break a three-year Israeli blockade on the territory. The same day, the country bans flotilla vessels from gathering in its territorial waters, which is commended by Israel as "an ethical deed and a voice of reason."
- 28 May – Cypriot authorities prevent any activists from leaving the island to join the flotilla, while Turkey urges Israel to treat the convoy as humanitarian aid.
- 29 May – Gaza prepares a welcoming party to receive the flotilla of ships demonstrating against Israel's naval blockade, while the ships are delayed near the country due to unsuccessful attempts to collect dozens of high-profile supporters from the island.
- 30 May – Ships of the Gaza protest flotilla set out from the country and sets sail for Gaza. However, three Irish politicians—Chris Andrews, Mark Daly and Aengus Ó Snodaigh—are prevented by police helicopters and port security from leaving Cyprus to join the flotilla.
- 3 June – Pope Benedict XVI visits the country for 3 days, the first such visit by any Pope in the modern era.
- 7 June – The Cyprus-based Free Gaza Movement packs up and leaves the country for London after the government's decision to interfere with and disrupt last week's international aid flotilla.
- 8 June – Television host Elena Skordelli goes on trial for the murder of Cypriot media mogul Andis Hadjicostis.
- 30 June – A man whom the United States considers to be the 11th member of a Russian spy ring goes missing in the country.
- 22 August – A Bolivian-flagged all-female international aid ship bound for Gaza is delayed after the country bans it from passing, with Israel's Ehud Barak calling on France and the U.S. to prevent it from sailing, claiming it is "a needless provocation."
- 29 September – Rallies take place in multiple European states, including Cyprus, against spending cuts.
- 14 October – A new border gate opens on island, providing a seventh crossing point between the country and Northern Cyprus.
- 3 December – Newly released cables reveal U.S. spy planes flew over Lebanese airspace via a British air base in the country in 2008.
