= Speaker of the House of Representatives (Cyprus) =

Cypriot government officer

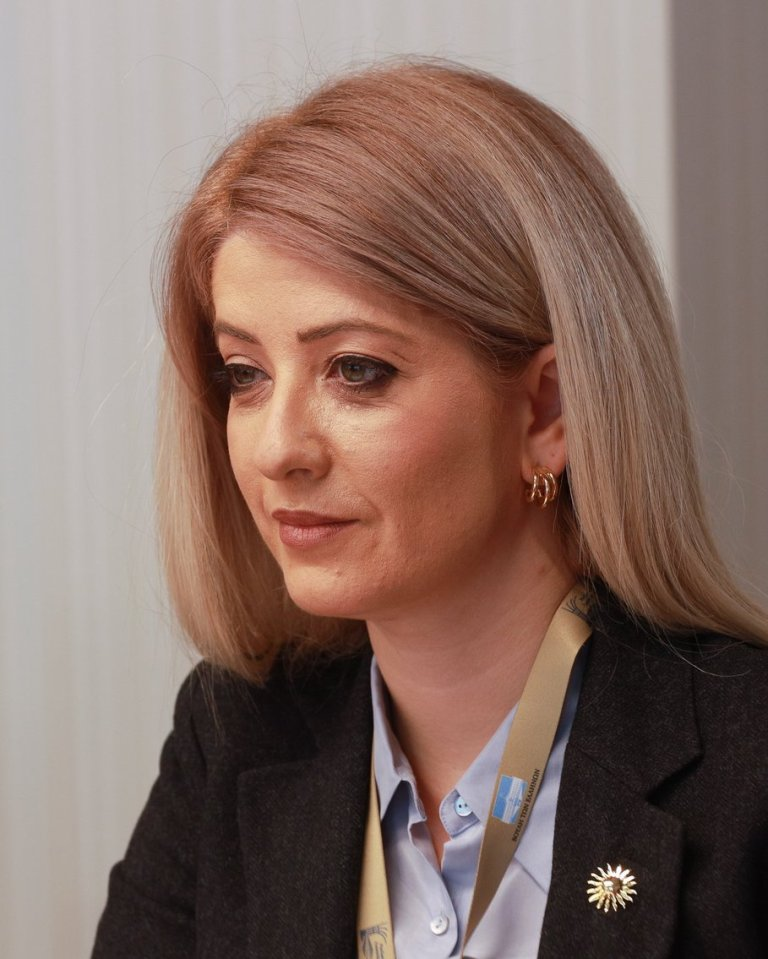
- Incumbent; Annita Demetriou since June 10, 2021
- House of Representatives (Cyprus)
- Status: Presiding officer
- Seat: Nicosia
- Nominator: Major parties
- Appointer: House of Representatives
- Term length: For the length of the legislative period; elected at the beginning of the new House by a majority of the representatives, and upon a vacancy during a House.
- Constituting instrument: Constitution of Cyprus
- Formation: August 16, 1960; 66 years ago
- First holder: Glafcos Clerides
- Succession: Second; De facto first, since the position of Vice President has been vacant since 1963.
- Website: www.parliament.cy

The speaker of the Cypriot House of Representatives, is the presiding officer of the Cypriot House of Representatives. The office was established in 1960 by Article 72 of the Constitution of the Republic of Cyprus.

The speaker is the parliamentary leader of the House and is simultaneously its presiding officer, and the institution's administrative head; responsible for chairing the House, appointing and supervising clerks, and addressing, on the behalf the House, the President of the Republic and other Officers of the State among other functions specified in the Constitution.

The Speaker is second in the Cypriot presidential line of succession, after the vice president, but since the office has been vacant since the events of 1963 the speaker is de facto first in the line of succession.

The current Speaker is the President of the Democratic Rally, Annita Demetriou. The 14th Speaker and first woman to occupy the office, she was elected on June 10, 2021, at the beginning of the XI Legislative Period.

== Election ==
According to the Constitution of Cyprus, the Speaker of the House is Greek Cypriot and is elected by the representatives of the Greek community (56 MPs). The Constitution also provides for the election of a Vice President of the House of Representatives, who is a Turkish Cypriot and is elected by the representatives of the Turkish community (24 MPs). However, ever since the Crisis of 1963–1964 the office of Vice President remains vacant.

The election of the Speaker of the House of Representatives takes place at the first session of the elected House. The same applies to the Vice President, with the two votes being conducted separately.

In case the office of the Speaker becomes vacant, a new election is carried out as soon as possible, and if necessary, even in an emergency session.

=== Selection process ===
During the first session of the House, the oldest member present occupies the position of speaker until the election of the new President of the House. The election procedure is as follows:

The candidate who receives the immediately following integer number of half the present members' votes is elected as the Speaker of the House. If the Speaker is not elected in the first round of voting, a second round follows. The candidate who receives 2/5 of the approval votes of the present voting members, excluding any fractions, is elected. If a Speaker is still not elected in the second round of voting, a third round of voting follows. The candidate who receives the most approval votes of the present and voting members is elected.

If there is a tie in the third round of voting, the session is interrupted and the parties consult with one another until they reach a solution.

== Absence ==
When the Speaker of the House is temporarily absent or there is a vacancy in their position, the duties of Speaker are exercised by the oldest MP of the Greek Cypriot community, unless the Members of that community decide otherwise. Constitutionally, the same applies to the Vice President and the MPs of the Turkish Cypriot community.

== Responsibilities ==
According to the Constitution, the Speaker of the House of Representatives:

1) Exercises the powers recognized to them by the Constitution, the Rules of Procedure, and the Laws.

2) The Speaker of the House:

2a. Maintains order during the proceedings of the House, enforces the Rules of Procedure, directs the discussion within the limits of the Rules of Procedure, puts matters to a vote, announces the results, interprets the feelings of the House, and generally ensures the smooth conduct of the business of the House.

2b. Speaks from the rostrum whenever a matter related to the Rules of Procedure is being discussed or to explain the position of the matter or to provide the necessary information or to bring back to the subject of the discussion the speakers or those who have deviated from order.

2c. Appoints and supervises the Secretaries and Sergeants-at-Arms regarding the execution of their duties.

2d. Supervises the services of the House and orders the expenses within the framework of the budget of the House.

2e. Represents the House at official events within and outside the House, as well as at official ceremonies and receptions, both during the proceedings of the House and after the end of the session.

2f. Addresses, on behalf of the House, the President of the Republic and other state officials.

== Emergency responsibilities ==
According to the Constitution, the speaker of the House replaces the president of the Republic when they are absent abroad for more than ten days, die, resign, are declared unfit, or are prevented for any reason from exercising their duties.

== List of speakers of the House of Representatives ==
The following people have served as speakers of the House.

- Glafcos Clerides: August 1960 – July 22, 1976
- Tassos Papadopoulos: July 22, 1976 – September 20, 1976
- Spyros Kyprianou: September 20, 1976 – September 20, 1977
- Alekos Michaelides: September 20, 1977 – June 4, 1981
- Georgios Ladas: June 4, 1981 – December 30, 1985
- Vassos Lyssarides: December 30, 1985 – May 30, 1991
- Alexis Galanos: May 30, 1991 – June 6, 1996
- Spyros Kyprianou: June 6, 1996 – June 7, 2001
- Dimitris Christofias: June 7, 2001 – February 28, 2008
- Marios Karoyian: March 7, 2008 – June 2, 2011
- Yiannakis Omirou: June 2, 2011 – June 2, 2016
- Demetris Syllouris: June 2, 2016 – October 15, 2020
- Adamos Adamou: October 15, 2020 – June 10, 2021
- Annita Demetriou: June 10, 2021 – present
