= 2011 in Cyprus =

- Decades: 1990s; 2000s; 2010s; 2020s
- See also: Other events of 2011; Timeline of Cypriot history

Events in the year 2011 in Cyprus.

== Incumbents ==
- President: Demetris Christofias
- President of the Parliament: Marios Garoyian (until 2 June), Yiannakis Omirou (starting 2 June)

== Events ==
Ongoing – Cyprus dispute

=== March ===
- 2 March – Thousands of Turkish Cypriots protest against Government of Turkey inspired spending cuts in Nicosia.

=== May ===
- 22 May – Parliamentary elections were held in the country to elect the 56 Members of the House of Representatives. They were won by the Democratic Rally, who increased their seats from 18 to 20. The governing Progressive Party of Working People also gained a seat, bringing them up to 19. The Democratic Party lost two of their 11 seats and the European Party lost one of their three seats. The Movement for Social Democracy held on to their five seats.

=== July ===
- 11 July – Captured explosives from Iran stored in Evangelos Florakis Navy Base, near Zygi, a Navy base munitions dump catches fire when a wildfire reached the base, causing massive explosions. The blast reportedly killed head of the Cyprus Navy Andreas Ioannides and the Commander of the Evangelos Florakis Navy Base Lambros Lambrou. The nearby Vassilikos power plant, which provides 60% of Cyprus' electricity, also received heavy damage from the blast. As a result of the accident, Cypriot National Guard chief of staff Petros Tsalikidis and Cypriot Defense Minister Costas Papacostas both resign from office.
- 12 July – Thousands of people march on the Presidential Palace in Nicosia in response to the explosion that occurred the day before. Police fire tear gas at the demonstrators who tie a banner to the palace gates which says "Christofias is a murderer and must go to jail."

=== September ===
- 21 September – Turkey signs an accord with Northern Cyprus to explore for oil and gas in the Eastern Mediterranean in response to a decision by Cyprus to drill for oil.

== Deaths ==
- 25 July – Michael Cacoyannis, Greek-Cypriot filmmaker, stage director (born 1922).
