= 2016 in Cyprus =

- Decades: 1990s; 2000s; 2010s; 2020s
- See also: Other events of 2016; Timeline of Cypriot history

Events in the year 2016 in Cyprus.

== Incumbents ==
- President: Nicos Anastasiades
- President of the Parliament: Yiannakis Omirou (until June 2) Demetris Syllouris (from June 2)

== Events ==
Ongoing – Cyprus dispute

=== March ===
- 29 March – EgyptAir Flight 181, a domestic passenger flight from Alexandria to Cairo International Airport, was hijacked and forced to divert to Larnaca International Airport.
- 30 March – A Larnaca court orders that 59-year-old Seif Eddin Mustafa, who was arrested by Cypriot police yesterday, remain in local police custody for eight days to assist Cyprus's own investigation. Mustafa faces charges of hijacking, illegal possession of explosives, kidnapping, and threats to commit violence after he hijacked EgyptAir Flight 181. Egypt General Prosecutor Nabil Sadek formally requests Mustafa's extradition from Cyprus.

=== May ===
- 22 May – The Democratic Rally wins the legislative election.

=== July ===
- 17 – 24 July – The 2016 FIBA Europe Under-16 Championship Division C was held in Nicosia.

=== August ===
- 5 – 21 August – Cyprus competed at the 2016 Summer Olympics in 7 sports with 16 competitors.

=== November ===
- 7 November – The leaders of Northern Cyprus and the Republic of Cyprus meet in Switzerland to restart talks about reuniting the island.
