= 2008 in Cyprus =

- Decades: 1980s; 1990s; 2000s; 2010s; 2020s
- See also: Other events of 2008; Timeline of Cypriot history

The following events occurred in the Republic of Cyprus during the year 2008.

== Incumbents ==
- President – Tassos Papadopoulos (until 28 February), Demetris Christofias (from 28 February)
- President of the Parliament: Dimitris Christofias (until 28 February), Marios Karoyian (from 28 February)

== Events ==
Ongoing – Cyprus dispute

=== January ===
- 1 January – Cyprus adopts and the euro, along with Malta, becoming the 14th and 15th countries respectively to do so. The Cypriot pound notes and coins will remain valid in shops until the end of the month, and exchangeable at the central bank for some years.

=== February ===
- 17 February – Incumbent Cypriot President Tassos Papadopoulos is eliminated in the first round of the Cypriot presidential election. The election is later won on February 24 by Demetris Christofias after he defeated competitor Ioannis Kasoulidis.

=== March ===
- March 5 – 12 – The 2008 Cyprus Cup took place; Canada women's national soccer team won the competition.

=== April ===
- 3 April – Greek and Turkish Cypriots open a crossing at Ledra Street, a main shopping street in Cyprus' divided capital Nicosia that had come to symbolize the island's ethnic partition.

=== May ===
- 24 May – The Eurovision Song Contest 2008 took place with Evdokia Kadi's Femme Fatale being chosen to represent Cyprus in the contest.

=== August ===
- 8 – 24 August – Cyprus competed in the 2008 Summer Olympics; the country won no medal.

== See also ==
- 2007–08 Cypriot First Division
- 2007–08 Cypriot Second Division
- 2008–09 Cypriot Cup
- 2008–09 Cypriot First Division
- 2008–09 Cypriot Second Division
- List of Cypriot football transfers summer 2008
- List of Cypriot football transfers winter 2008–09
