= 2009 in Cyprus =

- Decades: 1980s; 1990s; 2000s; 2010s; 2020s
- See also: Other events of 2009; Timeline of Cypriot history

Events in the year 2009 in Cyprus.

== Incumbents ==
- President: Demetris Christofias
- President of the Parliament: Marios Garoyian

== Events ==
Ongoing – Cyprus dispute

- 11 December – The body of former president Tassos Papadopoulos is stolen from the grave, a day before the first anniversary of his death.
