= 2013 in Cyprus =

- Decades: 1990s; 2000s; 2010s; 2020s
- See also: Other events of 2013; Timeline of Cypriot history

Events in the year 2013 in Cyprus.

== Incumbents ==
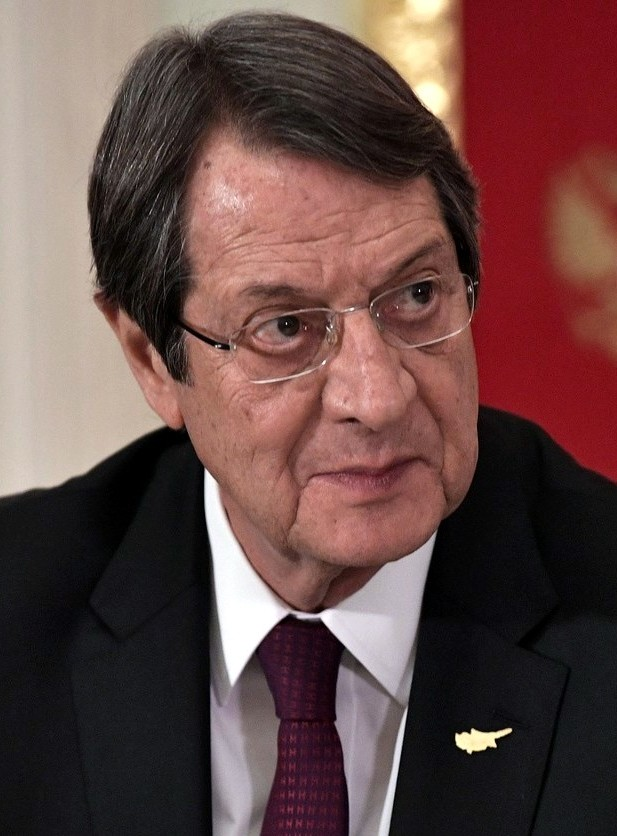
Nicos Anastasiades was elected as the next president.

- President: Demetris Christofias (until 28 February); Nicos Anastasiades (from 28 February)
- President of the Parliament: Yiannakis Omirou

== Events ==
Ongoing – 2012–2013 Cypriot financial crisis; Cyprus dispute

=== February ===
- 17 February – Voters in Cyprus go to the polls for a presidential election with Nicos Anastasiades of the Democratic Rally and Stavros Malas of AKEL to contest a runoff on 24 February. The runoff election is won by Nicos Anastasiades.

=== March ===
- 16 March
  - Cyprus defeat Bulgaria 79–10 in the European Nations Cup Second Division to earn their 18th consecutive Test victory. This at least ties the all-time record for consecutive Test wins, and (depending on the source) may be a new record.
  - A deal is reached between Cyprus and the EC–ECB–IMF troika. The terms of the €10 billion "bailout" package cause widespread anger among Cypriots who queue from early morning to withdraw their savings as it emerges that up to 10% of each citizen's deposits are to be wiped out to raise billions. The plan is overwhelmingly rejected by Cypriot lawmakers on March 19.
- 20 March – President of Cyprus Nicos Anastasiades presents a new bailout package for Cypriot banks as Cyprus is hit with a liquidity crisis.
- 22 March – Minister of Finance of Cyprus Michael Sarris says that his talks with officials in Russia about a possible rescue package for Cypriot banks have led nowhere.
- 23 March – The Cyprus Parliament approves three bills that aim to raise enough money to qualify the country for a broader bailout package and stave off financial collapse.
- 24 March – President Nicos Anastasiades begins a series of emergency meetings in Brussels in a last-ditch attempt to finalize a bailout.
- 25 March – Cyprus reportedly reaches an outline bank bailout deal with international lenders including the EU, the ECB and the IMF. Eurozone finance ministers approve the deal, which includes a radical downsizing of the island's Russian-fueled financial sector.
- 26 March – The Ministry of Finance says banks will remain shut until Thursday to give regulators time to guard against a run on deposits, and that big depositors in Cypriot banks can lose up to 40% of their funds, while depositors with less than 100,000 euros in their accounts will not be affected by bailout plans.
- 28 March – Security tightens in Cyprus as banks prepare to reopen after nearly two weeks, following a controversial international bailout that was negotiated with the EU and IMF.
- 29 March – President Nicos Anastasiades says the island has no intention of abandoning the euro, despite the tough conditions imposed by its 10 billion euro bailout deal with the EU and IMF.

=== April ===
- 2 April – Cypriot Finance Minister Michael Sarris resigns after completing talks on a controversial bailout deal and will be replaced by current Labour Minister Charis Georgiades.
- 12 April – E.U. finance ministers and central bank governors begin a two-day meeting at Dublin Castle to talk about austerity, the collapse of the Cypriot economy and the creation of a federal bank.

=== August ===
- 29 August – Britain sends six Typhoon fighter jets to the country in order to guard against potential retaliation by the Assad regime in the event of air strikes against Syria.

== Deaths ==
- 7 February – Niki Marangou, writer and painter (b. 1948).
- 29 April – Marianna Zachariadi, pole vaulter (b. 1990).
- 15 November – Glafcos Clerides, politician, President (b. 1919).
