= 2012 in Cyprus =

- Decades: 1990s; 2000s; 2010s; 2020s
- See also: Other events of 2012; Timeline of Cypriot history

Events in the year 2012 in Cyprus.

== Incumbents ==
- President: Demetris Christofias
- President of the Parliament: Yiannakis Omirou

== Events ==
Ongoing – 2012–2013 Cypriot financial crisis; Cyprus dispute

=== January ===
- 13 January – The credit rating agency Standard & Poor's lowers its long-term credit ratings by two notches on multiple eurozone countries, including Cyprus, while lowering it by one notch for Austria, France, Malta, Slovakia, and Slovenia.

=== June ===
- 25 June – The country announces that it plans to ask its European partners for a loan of about 1.8 billion euros by the end of this week; this would make Cyprus the fifth European country to seek help.

=== July ===
- 25 July – Lamia al-Hariri, Syrian ambassador to Cyprus, and her husband Abdelatif al-Dabbagh, Syrian ambassador to the UAE, defect to Qatar.
