= 2018 in Cyprus =

- Decades: 1990s; 2000s; 2010s; 2020s
- See also: Other events of 2018; Timeline of Cypriot history

Events in the year 2018 in Cyprus.

== Incumbents ==
- President: Nicos Anastasiades
- President of the Parliament: Demetris Syllouris

== Events ==
Ongoing – Cyprus dispute

=== January ===
- 28 January – Incumbent Nicos Anastasiades won the first round of the presidential election and later challenges his main competitor and a previous rival in the 2013 election, AKEL candidate Stavros Malas, in the second round of voting on February 4. Nicos Anastasiades wins the second round of voting with 55.99% of the vote and a 12% lead over Stavros Malas to be re-elected for a second five-year term.

=== February ===
- 6 February – The 2018 Cyprus gas dispute began after Turkey's foreign minister Mevlüt Çavuşoğlu rejected a 2003 Cypriot-Egyptian maritime border demarcation deal and announced the Turkish government's intention to carry out gas exploration in the region.
- 12 February – The E.U. urges calm and restraint after Turkish Navy warships obstruct a Cypriot offshore drilling vessel in the Eastern Mediterranean, which was approaching an area to explore for natural gas.

=== March ===
- 20 March – Turkish President Recep Tayyip Erdoğan asserts that his nation will secure Northern Cyprus' access to natural hydrocarbon resources off the Cypriot coast. The comments come amid disputes as to sovereign rights and access to offshore resources on the island.
- 22 March
  - The E.U. calls on Turkey to cease military actions aimed at enforcing Turkish claims to disputed natural gas deposits. The bloc also asks Turkey to release detained EU citizens.
  - Turkey announces it will send a drilling boat to disputed waters claimed by both Cyprus and Northern Cyprus.
- 23 March – Turkey calls a statement made by the E.U. in support for Greek Cypriots in a dispute over offshore resources "unacceptable". The Turkish Navy has been preventing exploration by Cypriot vessels.

=== April ===
- 15 April – An improvised explosive device damages a shopfront in Limassol, Cyprus.

=== June ===
- 26 June – An Israeli official says that the nation has asked Cyprus to consider allowing Israel to set up a shipping point on the island for goods destined for Gaza.

=== July ===
- 18 July – A migrant boat capsizes off the northern coast of Cyprus, killing at least 19 people. A further 25 people are reported missing while the Turkish coast guard rescues 103.

=== October ===
- 18 October – Cobalt Air, a Cypriot airline headquartered in Nicosia, suddenly announces its dissolution. It also cancels all further operations, leaving many passengers stranded in Cyprus.

== Deaths ==
- 5 March – Costakis Koutsokoumnis, football administrator (b. 1956).
