= 2014 in Cyprus =

- Decades: 1990s; 2000s; 2010s; 2020s
- See also: Other events of 2014; Timeline of Cypriot history

The following lists events from 2014 in Cyprus.

== Incumbents ==
- President: Nicos Anastasiades
- President of the Parliament: Yiannakis Omirou

== Events ==
Ongoing – Cyprus dispute

=== May ===
- 12 May – The European Court of Human Rights orders Turkey to pay $124 million in compensation for the 1974 Turkish invasion of Cyprus, which established the internationally unrecognized state of Turkish Republic of Northern Cyprus.
- 25 May – The 2014 European Parliament election in Cyprus took place, with a total of six members of the European Parliament being elected from Cyprus.

=== February ===
- 7 – 23 February – Cyprus competed in the 2014 Winter Olympics but won no medals.
- 11 February – Under pressure to extract natural gas reserves, talks begin over the Cyprus dispute.

== See also ==
- 2013–14 Cypriot First Division
- 2013–14 Cypriot Second Division
- 2014–15 Cypriot Cup
- 2014–15 Cypriot First Division
- 2014–15 Cypriot Second Division
- List of Cypriot football transfers summer 2014
- List of Cypriot football transfers winter 2014–15
