= Conquest of Cyprus by Richard I =

Conquest of Cyprus
- Part of Third Crusade
Date	April–May 1191
Location	Cyprus
Result	English Victory

Belligerents
Kingdom of England	Cyprus

Commanders and leaders
Richard I of England	Isaac Komnenos of Cyprus

King Richard I of England conquered the island of Cyprus from April to May 1191 during the Third Crusade.

== Context of the conquest ==
Richard I embarked on the Third Crusade in 1189. Early in 1191, Berengaria of Navarre, Richard's fiancée, and Joan, Richard's sister, were traveling together when their ship was wrecked on Cyprus. They were then captured by Isaac Komnenos, a local governor and self-proclaimed emperor of the Byzantine Empire. Richard arrived in Limassol on 6 May, where he met with Isaac. Isaac agreed to return Richard's belongings and send 500 of his soldiers to the Holy Land. While in Limassol, Richard also married Berengaria, who was crowned queen. However, once back at his fortress of Famagusta, Isaac broke his oath of hospitality when he ordered Richard to leave the island. Richard then proceeded to conquer the island within days and left sometime before June. There is speculation that Richard attacked Cyprus because Isaac was diverting the food supply from the Latin army at Acre. However, most modern scholars believe that Richard's conquest of Cyprus was incidental.

== Impact ==
This was a major turning point in the history of Cyprus and the Crusades, leading to the foundation of the Kingdom of Cyprus which would rule the island for several centuries.

== See also ==
- Conquest of Cyprus
