= 2015 in Cyprus =

- Decades: 1990s; 2000s; 2010s; 2020s
- See also: Other events of 2015; Timeline of Cypriot history

The following lists events that happened during 2015 in the Republic of Cyprus.

== Incumbents ==
- President: Nicos Anastasiades
- President of the Parliament: Yiannakis Omirou

== Events ==
Ongoing – Cyprus dispute

=== January ===
- 3 January – The Cypriot-registered cargo ship MV Cemfjord sinks off the northern coast of Scotland leaving the eight people on board missing.

=== February ===
- 11 February – The Greek Coast Guard rescues all 22 crewmen from a Cyprus-flagged vessel Good Faith that ran aground on the Greek island of Andros during a storm in the Aegean Sea.

=== March ===
- 13 March – Politicians in Cyprus demand the resignation of the governor of the central bank there, Chrystalla Georghadji, raising concerns about a conflict of interest.

=== April ===
- 2 April – Cyprus criminalizes Armenian genocide denial.

=== November ===
- 7 November – The University of Sydney's Australian Archaeological Mission, excavating at a UNESCO World Heritage Site on the southwestern coast of the country, discover the islands oldest theatre. Located in the ancient city of Nea Paphos (capital of Cyprus at the time), it is a Hellenistic-Roman structure believed to have been in use for about six and a half centuries, from c. 300 B.C. until its final destruction in the earthquakes of A.D. 365. The Roman columns are made of granite from quarries in Troad, Turkey.
- 20 November – Cyprus offers France the use of its airbase facilities to bomb the Islamic State of Iraq and the Levant in Syria. Cypriot airbases are already being used by British and Canadian air forces for military operations.
- 24 November – A bomb blast at the Hellenic Business Federation offices in central Athens, Greece, damages the Cypriot Embassy across the street. While there is yet no claim for responsibility the authorities suspect a domestic guerrilla group set off the blast.

=== December ===
- 3 December – Four Tornado GR4 fighter jets, operating out of RAF Akrotiri on Cyprus, successfully bomb ISIL-controlled oil wells in eastern Syria.
