= 2017 in Cyprus =

- Decades: 1990s; 2000s; 2010s; 2020s
- See also: Other events of 2017; Timeline of Cypriot history

Events in the year 2017 in Cyprus

== Incumbents ==
- President: Nicos Anastasiades
- President of the Parliament: Demetris Syllouris

== Events ==
Ongoing – Cyprus dispute

=== January ===
- 9 January – Greek and Turkish local leaders in the country resume talks to end the division of the island before a high level multilateral conference takes place in Geneva this week in the latest effort to reunify the island.
- 13 January – Turkish President Recep Tayyip Erdoğan vows that the Turkish Armed Forces will stay on Cyprus "in perpetuity" and that the proposal of a rotating presidency for a unified island is unacceptable, casting doubts on an eventual solution to the dispute. The remarks come as the latest round of unity talks end, set to restart on January 18.

=== February ===
- 10 February – the Cypriot parliament votes in favour of a bill by National People's Front party (ELAM), for commemorating the 1950 Cypriot enosis referendum in schools every year. The decision was received negatively by Turkish Cypriot politicians.

=== March ===
- 3 March – The European Parliament votes to end visa-free travel for U.S. citizens after the U.S. government failed to agree to visa-free travel for citizens of five E.U. member states, including Cyprus. The resolution is non-binding.
