= 2007 in Cyprus =

- Decades: 1980s; 1990s; 2000s; 2010s; 2020s
- See also: Other events of 2007; Timeline of Cypriot history

Events in the year 2007 in Cyprus.

== Incumbents ==
- President – Tassos Papadopoulos
- President of the Parliament: Dimitris Christofias

== Events ==
Ongoing – Cyprus dispute

- 18 August – An Atlas Jet plane en route from Nicosia to Istanbul was hijacked. Some passengers were freed while the plane refueled in Antalya, southern Turkey, and all 142 people on board escape unhurt after the hijackers surrendered.
