= 2006 in Cyprus =

- Decades: 1980s; 1990s; 2000s; 2010s; 2020s
- See also: Other events of 2006; Timeline of Cypriot history

Events in the year 2006 in Cyprus.

== Incumbents ==
- President – Tassos Papadopoulos
- President of the Parliament: Dimitris Christofias

== Events ==
Ongoing – Cyprus dispute

- 12 September – Cypriot authorities respond to an Interpol alert and intercept Grigorio-1, a North Korean ship bound for Syria. Cypriot security agents found a mobile air defense system and the components of a missile launcher in the ship, though the Government of North Korea insists the ship only contained weather-observation equipment. The Syrian government has requested the ship be allowed to dock in Syria.
