= 2001 in Cyprus =

- Decades: 1980s; 1990s; 2000s; 2010s; 2020s
- See also: Other events in 2001 · Timeline of Cypriot history

Events in the year 2001 in Cyprus.

== Incumbents ==
- President: Glafcos Clerides
- President of the Parliament: Spyros Kyprianou (until 7 June); Dimitris Christofias (starting 7 June)

== Events ==
Ongoing – Cyprus dispute

- 27 May – AKEL, a communist party, won 20 of the 56 seats in the parliament following parliamentary elections. The voter turnout was 91.8%.
