= 2002 in Cyprus =

- Decades: 1980s; 1990s; 2000s; 2010s; 2020s
- See also: Other events in 2002 · Timeline of Cypriot history

Events in the year 2002 in Cyprus.

== Incumbents ==
- President – Glafcos Clerides
- President of the Parliament: Dimitris Christofias

== Events ==
Ongoing – Cyprus dispute

- 13 December – The European Union invited the country along with Poland, Hungary, the Czech Republic, Slovakia, Slovenia, Latvia, Estonia, Lithuania, and Malta to join. Expansion is scheduled for May 2004.
