= 2003 in Cyprus =

- Decades: 1980s; 1990s; 2000s; 2010s; 2020s
- See also: Other events in 2003 · Timeline of Cypriot history

Events in the year 2003 in Cyprus.

== Incumbents ==
- President – Glafcos Clerides (until 28 February); Tassos Papadopoulos (starting 28 February)
- President of the Parliament: Dimitris Christofias

== Events ==
Ongoing – Accession of Cyprus to the European Union, Cyprus dispute

- 11 March – Kofi Annan, Secretary General of the United Nations, announces that UN-sponsored talks on the reunification of Cyprus have failed. Cyprus remains a candidate for EU membership and the Greek Cypriot government intends to sign on behalf of the whole island. Analysts suggested that Turkish opposition to unification may hurt Turkey's chances of joining the EU.
