= 2004 in Cyprus =

- Decades: 1980s; 1990s; 2000s; 2010s; 2020s
- See also: Other events in 2004 · Timeline of Cypriot history

Events in the year 2004 in Cyprus.

== Incumbents ==
- President – Tassos Papadopoulos
- President of the Parliament: Dimitris Christofias

== Events ==
Ongoing – Accession of Cyprus to the European Union, (until 1 May) Cyprus dispute

- 1 May - Cyprus joins the European Union.
- 14 November – Researchers claim to have found a site that may be a candidate for the lost city of Atlantis on the bottom of the east Mediterranean, 80 kilometers southeast of Cyprus. The Cypriot government disputes the claim, saying more evidence is needed.
- 17 December – The E.U. states that Turkey must recognize the ethnic-Greek government of the country before it can begin negotiations for E.U. membership. Currently Turkey is the only country that recognizes the Turkish Republic of Northern Cyprus.
