= 2005 in Cyprus =

- Decades: 1980s; 1990s; 2000s; 2010s; 2020s
- See also: Other events in 2005 · Timeline of Cypriot history

Events in the year 2005 in Cyprus.

== Incumbents ==
- President – Tassos Papadopoulos
- President of the Parliament: Dimitris Christofias

== Events ==
Ongoing – Cyprus dispute

- 14 August – Helios Airways Flight 522 en route from Larnaca via Athens to Prague crashes near Athens, killing at least 121 who were on board. Observations from Greek fighter aircraft indicate a decompression problem.
