= 1998 in Cyprus =

- Decades: 1970s; 1980s; 1990s; 2000s; 2010s
- See also: Other events in 1998 · Timeline of Cypriot history

Events in the year 1998 in Cyprus.

== Incumbents ==
- President: Glafcos Clerides
- President of the Parliament: Spyros Kyprianou

== Events ==
Ongoing – Cyprus dispute

- 23 September – Helios Airways, the first independent, privately owned airline in the country, was founded.
