= Conquest of Cyprus =

The Conquest of Cyprus may refer to:

- Roman conquest of Cyprus from Ptolemaid Egypt in 58 BC
- Muslim conquest of Cyprus during Arab–Byzantine wars
- English conquest of Cyprus from a Byzantine rebel in 1191 during the Third Crusade
- Ottoman conquest of Cyprus during the 1570–1573 Ottoman–Venetian War
- Turkish invasion of Cyprus (1974), created Northern Cyprus as part of the Cyprus conflict

== See also ==
- Cyprus conflict
- List of massacres in Cyprus
