= 1999 in Cyprus =

- Decades: 1970s; 1980s; 1990s; 2000s; 2010s
- See also: Other events in 1999 · Timeline of Cypriot history

Events in the year 1999 in Cyprus.

== Incumbents ==
- President: Glafcos Clerides
- President of the Parliament: Spyros Kyprianou

== Events ==
Ongoing – Cyprus dispute

- 7 April – President Spyros Kyprianou flew to Belgrade to help with the negotiations for the release of the three American soldiers detained by Serbia.
