= Elena Skordelli =

Cypriot television presenter (born c. 1968)

- Born: Anna Skordelli; 10 September 1968 (age 57); Oslo, Norway
- Years active: 2009-present

Elena (Anna) Skordelli (Greek: Έλενα Σκορδέλη) (born c. 10 September 1968) is a Cypriot television presenter. In 2009 she was dismissed from her job at Sigma TV. She then worked for CNC Plus TV.

== Murder trial ==
In June 2010, Skortelli along with her brother Tasos Krasopoulis and Andrea Gregoriou, was put on trial for allegedly conspiring to murder Andis Hadjicostis. Hajicostis, who was shot and killed in January 2010, was chief executive of the Dias media group, owner of Skorelli's former employer Sigma TV.

On 13 June 2013, Skordelli, her brother Tasos Krasopoulis, Andreas Gregoriou and Grigoris Xenofontos were found guilty of killing Sigma boss Andis Hadjicostis by the Nicosia Criminal Court and sentenced to life imprisonment.
