= 1997 in Cyprus =

- Decades: 1970s; 1980s; 1990s; 2000s; 2010s
- See also: Other events in 1997 · Timeline of Cypriot history

Events in the year 1997 in Cyprus.

== Incumbents ==
- President: Glafcos Clerides
- President of the Parliament: Spyros Kyprianou

== Events ==
Ongoing – Cyprus dispute

- July 9–12: President Glafcos Clerides and his Turkish counterpart Rauf Denktaş held face-to-face talks with each other under U.N. auspices at Troutbeck, New York.
