= 2000 in Cyprus =

- Decades: 1980s; 1990s; 2000s; 2010s; 2020s
- See also: Other events in 2000 · Timeline of Cypriot history

Events in the year 2000 in Cyprus.

== Incumbents ==
- President: Glafcos Clerides
- President of the Parliament: Spyros Kyprianou

== Events ==
Ongoing – Cyprus dispute

- 16 February – The country competed at Eurovision with the song "Nomiza" by Voice.
