= Andis Hadjicostis =

Cypriot businessman (1968–2010)

Hadjicostis

Andis Hadjicostis (Greek: Άντης Χατζηκωστής; September 12, 1968 in Nicosia – January 11, 2010) was a Cypriot businessman and media mogul. Hadjicostis is credited with creating Sigma TV, a popular commercial television station in Cyprus, and the station's CEO. He also was the CEO of the private, family-owned Dias Media Group, which controls Cypriot television stations, radio and newspapers. Hadjicostis modernized and reformed Dias during his tenure.

Andis Hadjicostis was shot and killed with a shotgun on January 11, 2010, while leaving his home in the Engomi neighborhood of Nicosia. He was 41 years old at the time of his murder.

The Simerini, a Dias owned newspaper, printed the front page editorial headline, "Cowardly murder – they killed Andy Hadjicostis in cold blood." Sigma TV switched to classical music programming on news of Hadjicostis' murder.

Cypriot police allege that Hadjicostis was murdered by a former employee, Elena Skordelli, a presenter on one of the victim's television stations. Skordelli had recently been fired. Skordelli, her brother and two other men allegedly conspired to kill Hadjicostis.

Elena Skordeli, her brother and the two other suspects were sentenced to life in prison in June 2013, for the conspiracy and murder of Andis Hadjicostis.
