= Demetris Syllouris =

Cypriot politician (born 1953)

- Δημήτρηs Συλλούρης
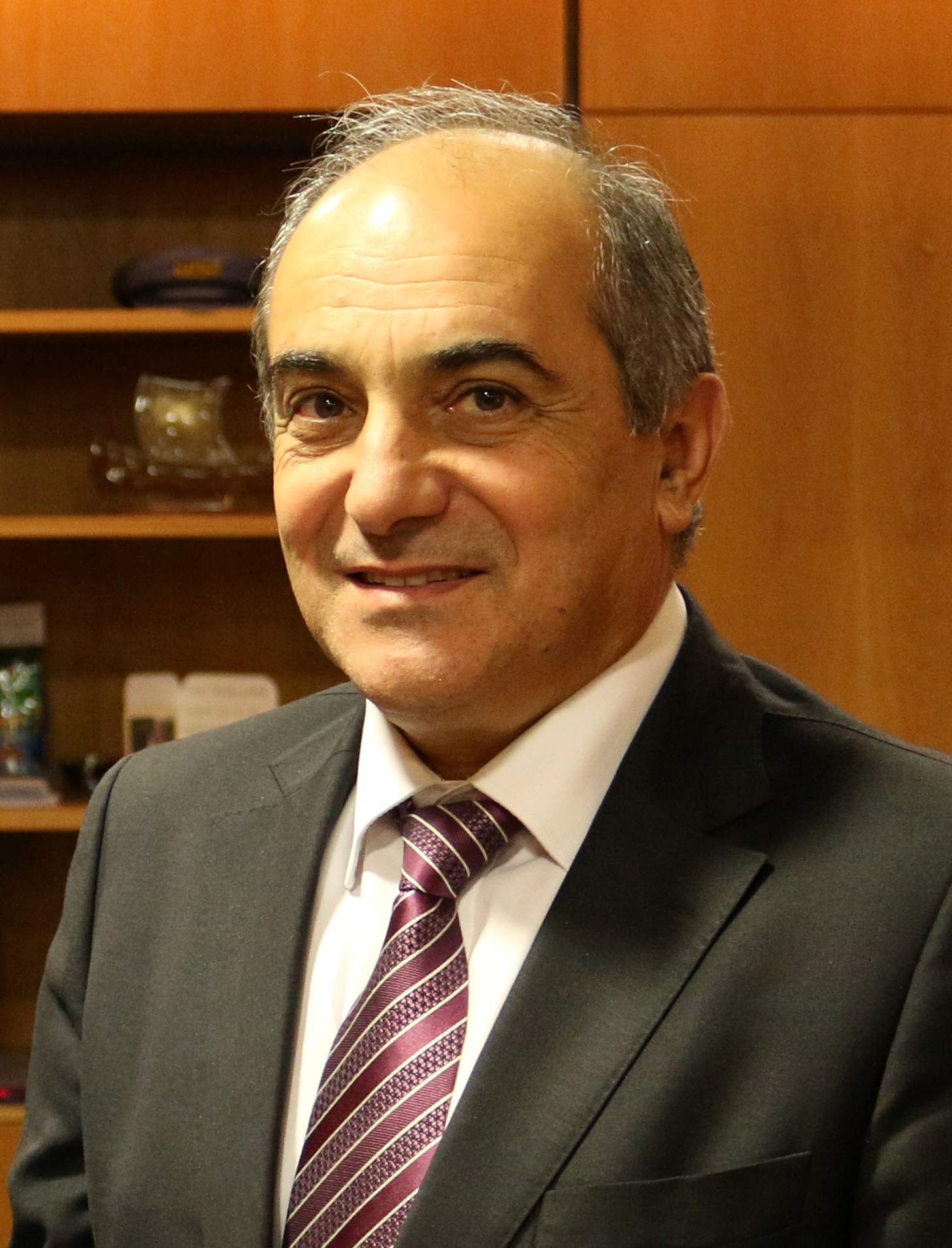
- Syllouris in 2017

President of the House of Representatives
- In office 2 June 2016 – 15 October 2020
- Preceded by: Yiannakis Omirou
- Succeeded by: Adamos Adamou

1st President of European Party
- In office 2005–2016

Personal details
- Born: 27 July 1953 (age 73) Nicosia, British Cyprus (present day Cyprus)
- Party: Solidarity Movement (2016–2020); European Party (2005–2016); Democratic Rally (1991–2004)
- Education: University of East London
- Profession: Civil engineering
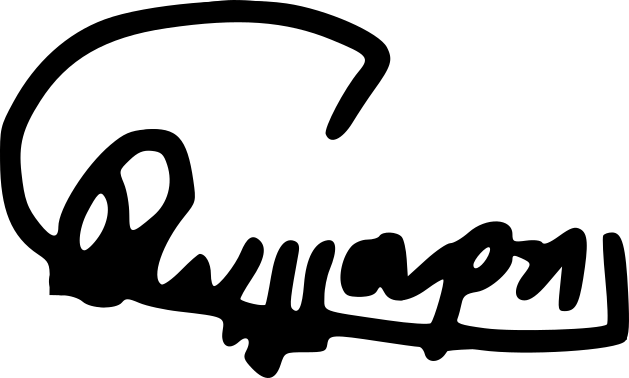
- Signature

Demetris Syllouris (Greek: Δημήτρης Συλλούρης; born 27 July 1953) is a Greek-Cypriot politician. He was the president of the Cypriot parliament and European Party leader between 2005 and 2016.

Syllouris was born in Nicosia and studied Civil Engineering at the University of East London.

== Career ==
Representative of Nicosia constituency under the banner of Democratic Rally Party (DISY)-Liberals Coalition 1991–2001, under the banner of DISY 2001–2004, independent 2004–2005, under the banner of the European Party 2005-2016 and since March 2016 under the banner of “Solidarity".

On 2 June 2016 he was elected President of the House of Representatives for the Eleventh Term of Office of the House.

In October 2020, having been implicated by the Al Jazeera investigation into the selling of Cypriot citizenship, he resigned from his role in government.

=== Parliamentary roles ===
- Parliamentary Spokesman of DISY (June 2001 – May 2004).
- Member of the Committee of Selection.
- Chairman of the House Standing Committee on Trade and Industry and the House Standing Committee on Institutions, Merit and the Commissioner for Administration (Ombudsman).
- Deputy Chairman of the House Standing Committee on Foreign Affairs.
- Second Vice-chairman of the delegation of the House to the EU-Cyprus Joint Parliamentary Committee (JPC).
- Spokesman of the European Party group in the House.
- Ex officio Chairman of the Committee of Selection.
- Ex officio Chairman of the Ad Hoc House Committee on the Observance of the Rules of Procedure of the House of Representatives.
- Ex officio Chairman of the Special House Committee on Declaration and Examination of Financial Interests.
- Chairman of the Ad Hoc House Committee on the Review and Update of the Rules of Procedure of the House of Representatives.

=== Party and organisational roles ===
- Secretary of the DISY Youth Organisation (NEDISY) and DISY Enlightenment Committees.
- Nicosia District Organisational Secretary of DISY and General Secretary of the Party.
- Observer to the European Parliament (2003) and Political Group member of the European People's Party.
- Member of the Cyprus Scientific and Technical Chamber (ETEK).
- Founding member and President of the European Party (2005–2016).
- Member of "Solidarity."
- Member of the National Council.

== Corruption allegations ==
In October 2020, Al Jazeera presented hidden-camera footage of Syllouris recorded in October 2019 (at a time in which he was already President of the parliament) in which he meets with journalists posing as representatives of a non-existing Chinese businessman and convicted money-launderer. In the footage, Syllouris promises to use his influence so that the businessman receives Cypriot citizenship, even though providing citizenship to convicted criminals contravenes Cypriot law. In response, Syllouris claimed that he was playing along with the representatives to gather more information and to finally report the case to the authorities, as he did shortly after. In April 2021, 'The Cyprus Papers' was BAFTA nominated.
