= Marios Garoyian =

Cypriot politician (born 1961)

- Μάριος Καρογιάν
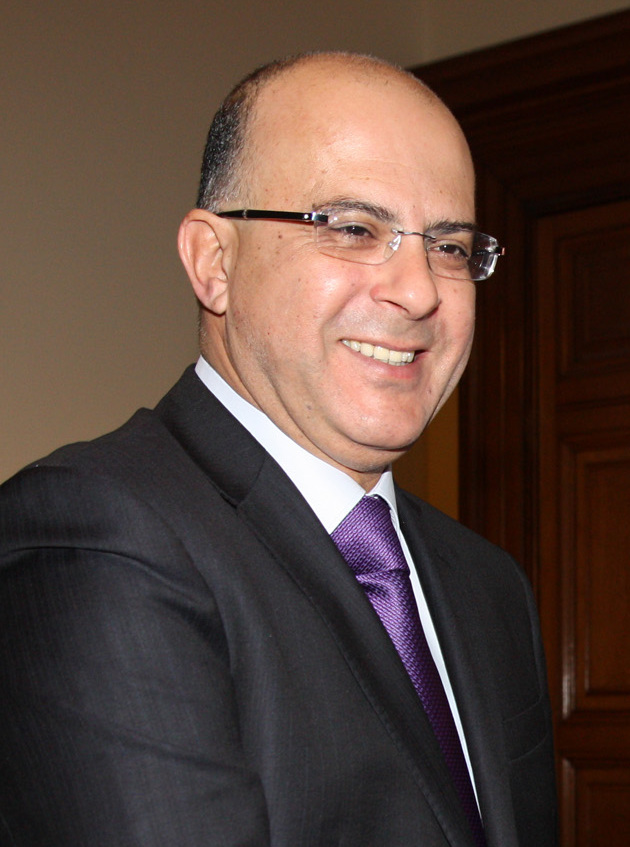
- Garoyian in 2011

10th President of the House of Representatives
- In office 6 March 2008 – 2 June 2011
- Preceded by: Demetris Christofias
- Succeeded by: Yiannakis Omirou

President of Democratic Alignment
- Incumbent
- Assumed office 21 October 2018

President of Democratic Party
- In office 22 October 2006 – 2 December 2013
- Preceded by: Tassos Papadopoulos
- Succeeded by: Nikolas Papadopoulos

Member of the House of Representatives
- In office 1 June 2006 – 1 June 2016
- Constituency: Nicosia District

Member of the House of Representatives
- Incumbent
- Assumed office 1 June 2021
- Constituency: Limassol District

Personal details
- Born: 31 May 1961 (age 65) Nicosia, Cyprus
- Party: Democratic Party (Until 2018), Democratic Alignment (2018–)
- Spouse: Rodica Dinisiuc
- Children: 2
- Education: University of Perugia
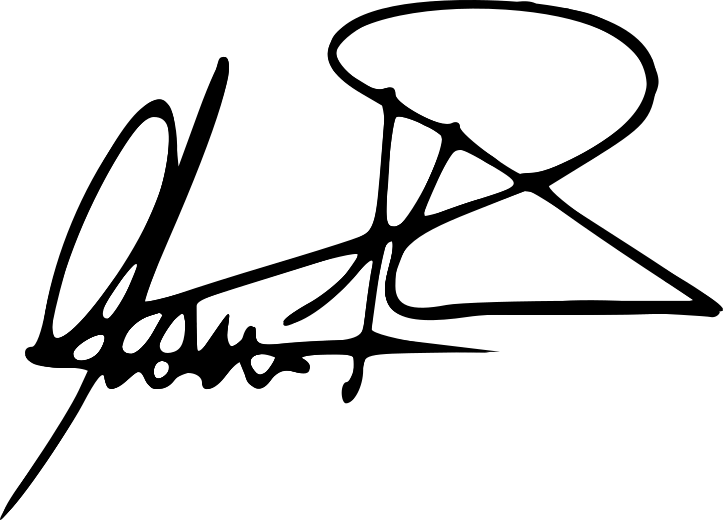
- Signature

Marios Garoyian (Greek: Μάριος Καρογιάν; Armenian: Մարիոս Կարոյեան; born 31 May 1961) is a Cypriot politician. He served as leader of the Democratic Party from 2006 to 2013 and as President of the House of Representatives of Cyprus from 2008 to 2011.

== Early life ==
Garoyian was born in Nicosia. He studied political science at the University of Perugia. He has one son and one daughter. He speaks Greek, English, Italian and Spanish fluently. He is of half Armenian and half Latin descent.

After the election of Dimitris Christofias as President of the Republic of Cyprus on 24 February 2008, the position of the President of the House of Representatives remained vacant until Garoyian's election to the post on 6 March 2008 by the members of the House.

== Parliamentary activities ==
At the parliamentary elections of 21 May 2006, he was elected Member of the House of Representatives standing as a DIKO candidate in Nicosia. He was elected President of the House of Representatives for the remainder of the Ninth Term of Office of the House.

He is a member of the Committee of Selection, of the House Standing Committee on the Environment and of the House Standing Committee on Foreign Affairs and an alternate member of the Special House Committee on Declaration and Examination of Financial Interests.

He is an alternate member of the delegation of the House to the Euro-Mediterranean Parliamentary Assembly.

== Political and social activities ==
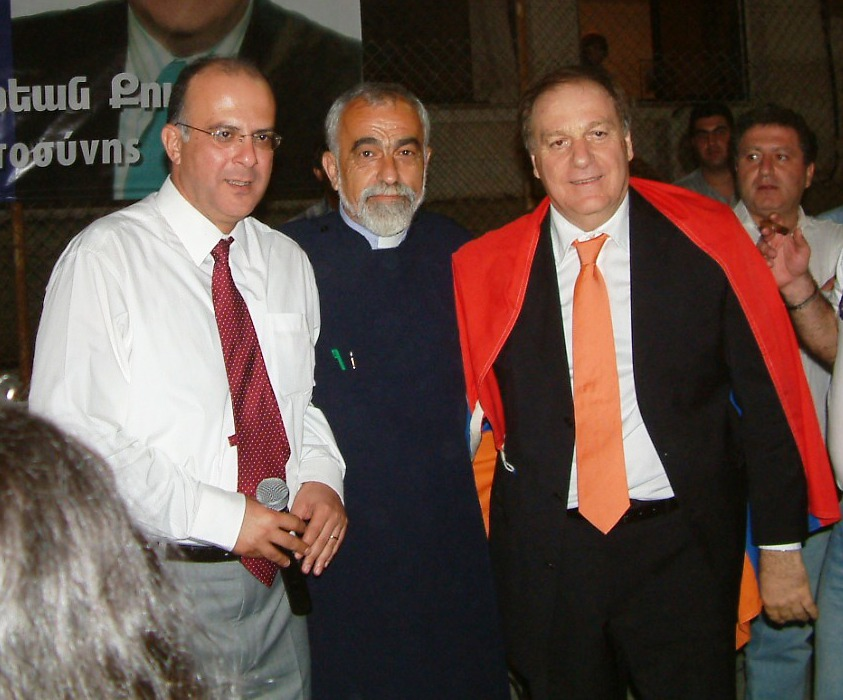
Representative Vartkes Mahdessian together with Marios Garoyian and Archbishop Varoujan

He was president of the "Anagennisi" student union in Italy (1981) and of the National Student Union of Cypriots in Perugia (1983) and a member of the Executive Committee of the Pancyprian Student and Young Scientists Federation.

He was also president of the District Committee of the Youth Organisation of DIKO (NEDIK) in Nicosia and secretary of Unionism of the Labour Department of the party.

He was director of the President’s Office of the House of Representatives from 1991 to 2001, during the presidency terms of Alexis Galanos and the late Spyros Kyprianou. He was director of the Press Office of the President of the Republic Tassos Papadopoulos and Deputy Government Spokesman from 2003 to 2006.

He has been a member of the Central Committee of DIKO since 1988 and a member of the Executive Bureau of the party since 1997. On 22 October 2006 he was elected president of DIKO, a position he held until 2 December 2013.

== Publications ==
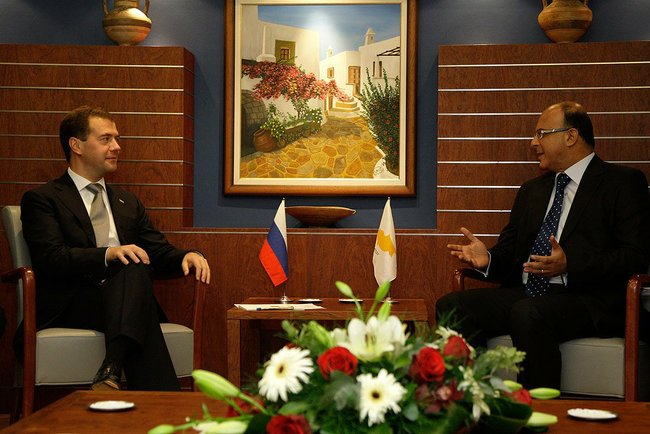
Marios Garoyian as President of the House of Representatives with Dmitry Medvedev

He has published a series of articles on the Cyprus problem and the European Union, as well as on various topics of wider public interest in the Cyprus and foreign press. As an international and a political analyst he appears regularly in Cypriot and Greek media.

== Honorary awards ==
The Hellenic Republic has awarded him the cross of the Grand Commander of the Order of Honour.

Political offices
Preceded by Tassos Papadopoulos	President of Democratic Party; 2006–2013	Succeeded by Nicolas Papadopoulos
Party political offices
Preceded by Demetris Christofias	President of the House of Representatives; 2008–2011	Succeeded by Yiannakis Omirou
