= Yiannakis Omirou =

Greek-Cypriot politician

- Γιαννάκης Ομήρου
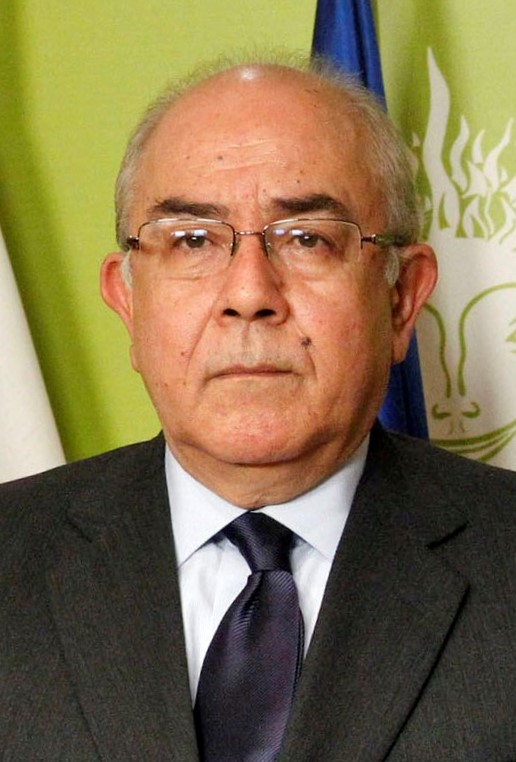
- Omirou in 2013

11th President of the House of Representatives
- In office 2 June 2011 – 2 June 2016
- Preceded by: Marios Garoyian
- Succeeded by: Demetris Syllouris

2nd President of EDEK
- In office 2001–2015
- Preceded by: Vassos Lyssarides
- Succeeded by: Marinos Sizopoulos

Personal details
- Born: 18 September 1951 (age 74) Paphos, Cyprus
- Party: EDEK
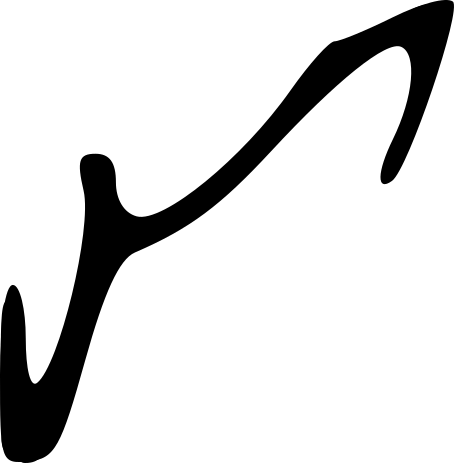
- Signature

Yiannakis Omirou (Greek: Γιαννάκης Ομήρου; born 18 September 1951) is a Greek-Cypriot politician. He was president of the Cypriot parliament from 2011 to 2016 and leader of the political party EDEK between 2001 and 2015.

Omirou was born in Paphos and studied law at the National and Kapodistrian University of Athens. He was an active member of the resistance movement against the 1974 coup. He is single and speaks English fluently.

Political offices
Preceded by Vassos Lyssarides	President of EDEK; 2001–2015	Succeeded by Marinos Sizopoulos
Party political offices
Preceded by Marios Garoyian	President of the House of Representatives; 2011–2016	Succeeded by Demetris Syllouris
