= History of Cyprus =

Human habitation of Cyprus dates back to the Paleolithic era. Cyprus's geographic position has caused the island to be influenced by differing Eastern Mediterranean civilizations over millennia.

Periods of Cyprus's history from 1050 BC have been named according to styles of pottery found, as follows:

- Cypro-Geometric I: 1050–950 BC
- Cypro-Geometric II: 950–900 BC
- Cypro-Geometric III: 900–750 BC
- Cypro-Archaic I: 750–600 BC
- Cypro-Archaic II: 600–480 BC
- Cypro-Classical I: 480–400 BC
- Cypro-Classical II: 400–310 BC

== Prehistoric Cyprus ==
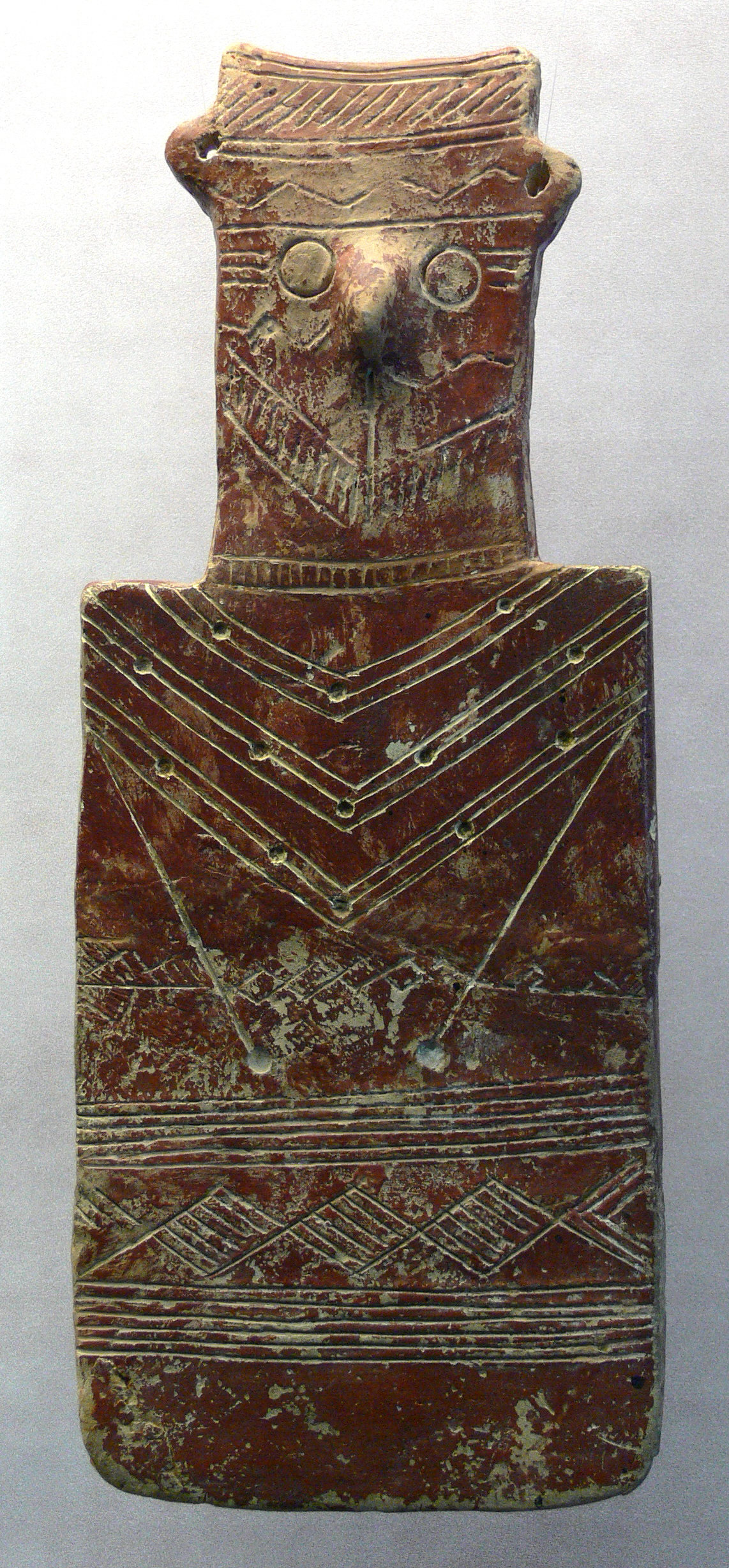
Cypriot cult image. 'Red Polished Ware', 2100–2000 BC. Museum zu Allerheiligen

Prior to the arrival of humans in Cyprus, only four terrestrial mammal species were present on the island, including the Cypriot pygmy hippopotamus and the Cyprus dwarf elephant, which were much smaller than their mainland ancestors as a result of insular dwarfism, with the other species being the Cypriot genet and the extant Cypriot mouse. The earliest humans to inhabit Cyprus were hunter gatherers who arrived on the island around 11,000–10,000 BC. The last records of the now extinct endemic mammals date to shortly after human settlement. The hunter gatherers later introduced wild boar to the island around 12,000 years ago, likely to act as a food source. The earliest presence of Neolithic farming settlements dates to around 8,500 BC.

Dogs, sheep, goats and possibly cattle were introduced, as well as numerous wild animals such as foxes and Persian fallow deer that were previously unknown on the island. The Pre-Pottery Neolithic B settlers built round houses with floors made of terrazzo of burned lime (e.g. Kastros, Shillourokambos) and cultivated einkorn and emmer. Pigs, sheep, goats and cattle were kept but remained, for the most part, behaviourally wild. Evidence of cattle such as was attested at Shillourokambos is rare, and when they apparently died out in the course of the 8th millennium BC they were not re-introduced until the Ceramic Neolithic.

In the 6th millennium BC, the aceramic Khirokitia culture was characterised by roundhouses, stone vessels and an economy based on sheep, goats and pigs. Cattle were unknown, and Persian fallow deer were hunted. This was followed by the ceramic Sotira phase. The Eneolithic era is characterised by stone figurines with spread arms.

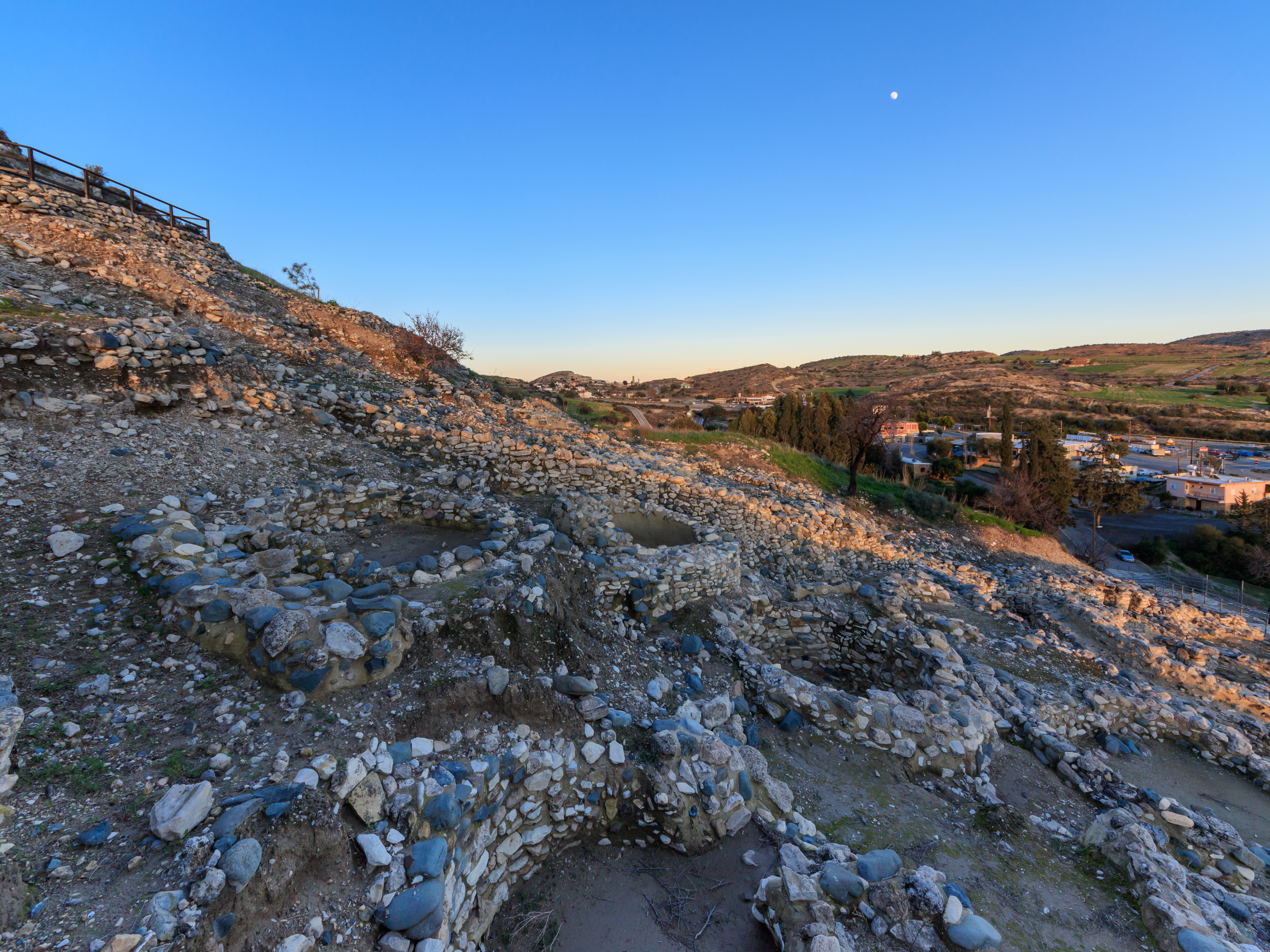
Khirokitia archeological site.

Water wells discovered by archaeologists in western Cyprus are believed to be among the oldest in the world, dated at 9,000 to 10,500 years old, putting them in the Stone Age. They are said to show the sophistication of early settlers, and their heightened appreciation for the environment.

In 2004, the remains of an 8-month-old cat were discovered buried with its human owner at a Neolithic archeological site in Cyprus. The grave is estimated to be 9,500 years old, predating Egyptian civilization and significantly pushing back the earliest known feline-human association.

== Bronze Age ==
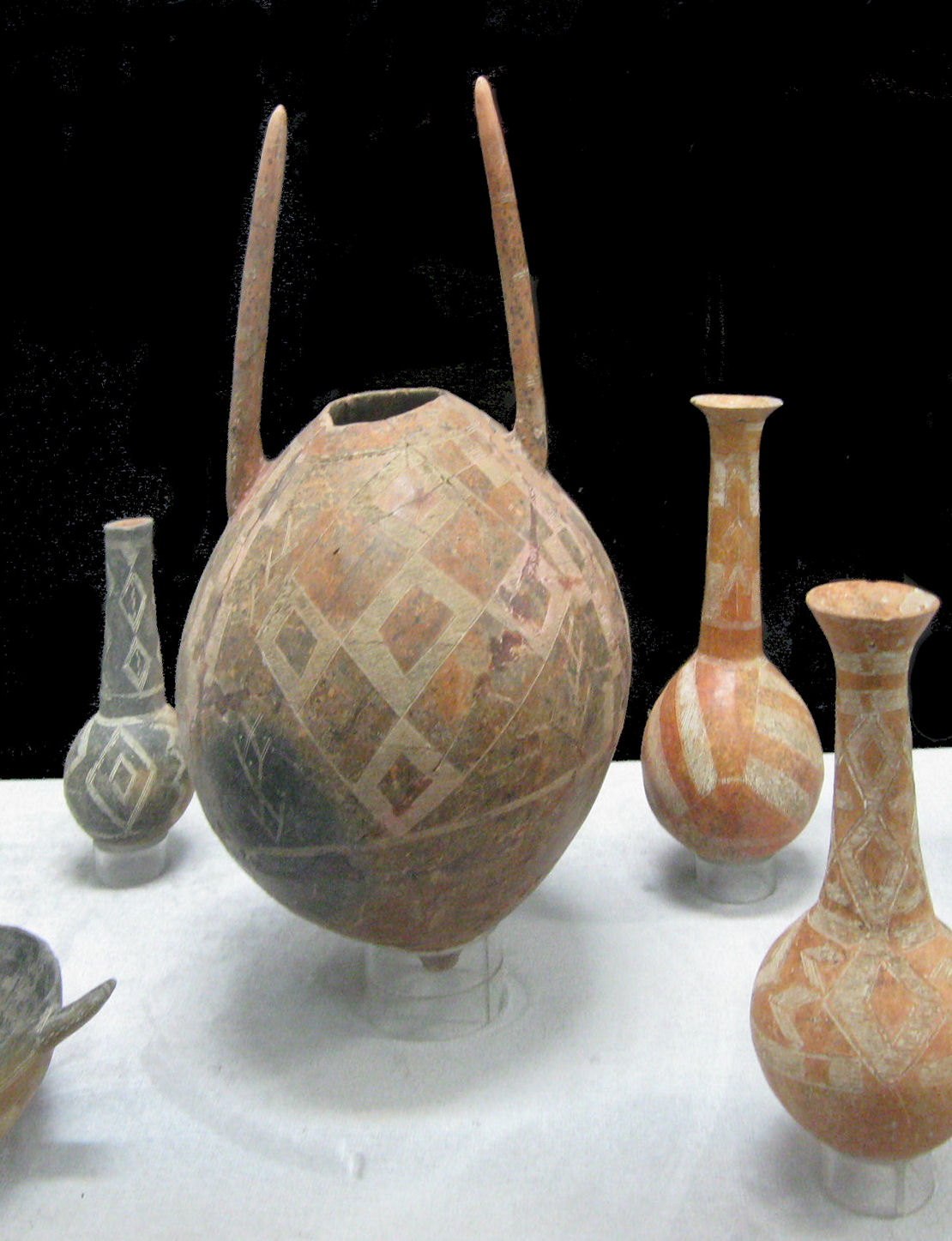
Red-polished ceramics from Enkomi, 1900–1725 BC. St. Barnabas Archaeological Museum, Salamis, Cyprus

In the Bronze Age the first cities, such as Enkomi, were built in Alashiya (today Cyprus). Systematic copper mining began, and this resource was widely traded. Mycenaean Greeks were undoubtedly inhabiting Cyprus from the late stage of the Bronze Age while culturally destroying Alashiya, whereas the island's Greek name is already attested from the 15th century BC in the Linear B script.

The undeciphered Cypro-Minoan script was first used in early phases of the late Bronze Age (LCIB) and continued in use for around 500 years into the LC IIIB, maybe up to the second half of the eleventh century BC. It is not known if pre-Greek languages survived beyond the Bronze Age as Eteocypriot, or if this language was introduced by later eastern immigrants.

The LCIIC (1300–1200 BC) was a time of local prosperity. Cities such as Enkomi were rebuilt on a rectangular grid plan, where the town gates correspond to the grid axes and numerous grand buildings front the street system or newly founded. Great official buildings constructed from ashlar masonry point to increased social hierarchisation and control. Some of these buildings contain facilities for processing and storing olive oil, such as Maroni-Vournes and Building X at Kalavassos-Ayios Dhimitrios. A sanctuary with a horned altar constructed from ashlar has been found at Myrtou-Pigadhes, other temples have been located at Enkomi, Kition, and Palaepaphos in modern Kouklia. Both the regular layout of the cities and the new masonry techniques find their closest parallels in Syria, especially in Ugarit. Rectangular corbelled tombs point to close contacts with Syria and Canaan.

The practice of writing spread and tablets in the Cypro-Minoan script have been found at Ugarit. Ugaritic texts from Ugarit and Enkomi mention Ya, the Assyrian name of Cyprus, that thus seems to have been in use already in the late Bronze Age.

Copper ingots shaped like oxhides have been recovered from shipwrecks such as at Uluburun, Iria and Cape Gelidonya, which attest to the widespread metal trade. Weights in the shape of animals found in Enkomi and Kalavassos follow the Syro-Palestinian, Mesopotamian, Hittite and Aegean standards and thus attest to the wide-ranging trade as well.

Late Bronze Age Cyprus was a client state of the Hittite Empire and governed by the ruling kings of Ugarit. As such Cyprus was essentially "left alone with little intervention in Cypriot affairs".

Achaean Greeks were living in Cyprus from the 14th century. Greeks colonized Cyprus from 1210 to 1000 BC. Dorian Greeks arrived around 1100 BC and, unlike the pattern on the Greek mainland, the evidence suggests that they settled on Cyprus peacefully.

Another wave of Greek settlement is believed to have taken place in the following century (LCIIIB, 1100–1050), indicated, among other things, by a new type of graves (long dromoi) and Mycenaean influences in pottery decoration.

=== Alashiya ===
Alashiya, the Bronze Age Eastern Mediterranean state that was the major source of copper in the region, was likely situated in Cyprus or includes parts of Cyprus.

Correspondences between the King of Alashiya and Egyptian administration could be found in the Amarna letters, while the Ugaritic texts contains exchanges between the King of Alashiya and the King of Ugarit.

In the second half of the 13th century BC, the current town of Enkomi – if it can be identified with Alashiya – was conquered and destroyed twice. The first destruction may have coincided with the historically documented conquest of Alashiya by the Hittite king Tudḫalija IV. The second destruction took place around 1220 BC, apparently by members of the Mycenaean Greek culture, who rebuilt the city in a chessboard fashion. Around 1050 BC Enkomi was destroyed again by an earthquake.

=== Pottery ===
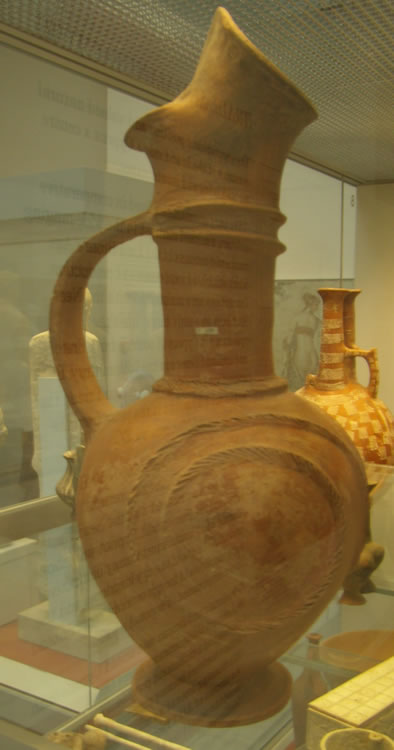
Base ring vessel of Late Bronze Age

In the later phase of the Late Bronze Age (LCIIIA, 1200–1100 BC) great amounts of 'Mycenaean' IIIC:1b pottery were produced locally. New architectural features include cyclopean walls, found on the Greek mainland, as well and a certain type of rectangular stepped capitals, endemic to Cyprus. Chamber tombs are given up in favour of shaft graves. Large amounts of IIIC:1b pottery are found in Palestine during this period as well. While this was formerly interpreted as evidence of an invasion (Sea Peoples), this is seen more and more as an indigenous development, triggered by increasing trade relations with Cyprus and Crete. Evidence of early trade with Crete is found in archaeological recovery on Cyprus of pottery from Kydonia, a powerful urban center of ancient Crete.

=== Cypriot city kingdoms ===
Most authors claim that the Cypriot city kingdoms, first described in written sources in the 8th century BC, were already founded in the 11th century BC. Other scholars see a slow process of increasing social complexity between the 12th and the 8th centuries, based on a network of chiefdoms. In the 8th century (Geometric period) the number of settlements increases sharply and monumental tombs like those in Salamis appear for the first time. This could be a better indication for the appearance of the Cypriot kingdoms.

== Early Iron Age ==
The early Iron Age on Cyprus follows the Submycenaean period (1125–1050 BC) of the Late Bronze Age. It is divided into the Geometric (1050–700 BC) and Archaic (700–525 BC) periods.

Foundations myths documented by classical authors connect the foundation of numerous Cypriot towns with immigrant Greek heroes in the wake of the Trojan War. For example, Teucer, brother of Aias was supposed to have founded Salamis, and the Arcadian Agapenor of Tegea to have replaced the native ruler Kinyras and to have founded Paphos. Some scholars see this a memory of a Greek colonisation already in the 11th century BC. Tomb 49 from the 11th century BC was found in Palaepaphos-Skales, containing three bronze obeloi with inscriptions in Cypriot syllabic script, one of which bears the name of Opheltas. This is the first indication of the use of Greek language on the island.

Cremation as a burial rite is seen as a Greek introduction as well. The first cremation burial in bronze vessels has been found at Kourion-Kaloriziki, tomb 40, dated to the first half of the 11th century BC (LCIIIB). The shaft grave contained two bronze rod tripod stands, the remains of a shield and a golden sceptre as well. Formerly seen as the royal grave of first Argive founders of Kourion, it is now interpreted as the tomb of a native Cypriot or a Phoenician prince. The cloisonné enamelling of the sceptre head with the two falcons surmounting it has no parallels in the Aegean, but shows a strong Egyptian influence.

A population living in Amathus in the early Iron Age left inscriptions in the Eteocypriot language using the Cypriot syllabary. It is not known if this language survived from a Bronze Age language spoken in Cyprus, maybe one written in the Cypro-Minoan script, or if it was related to Hurrian, since later eastern immigrants may have adopted the script, similar to how the Mycenaeans adopted the Minoan script.

=== Phoenicians ===
Literary evidence suggests an early Phoenician presence at Kition which was under Tyrian rule at the beginning of the 10th century BC. Some Phoenician merchants who were believed to come from Tyre colonized the area and expanded the political influence of Kition. After c. 850 BC the sanctuaries [at the Kathari site] were rebuilt and reused by the Phoenicians.

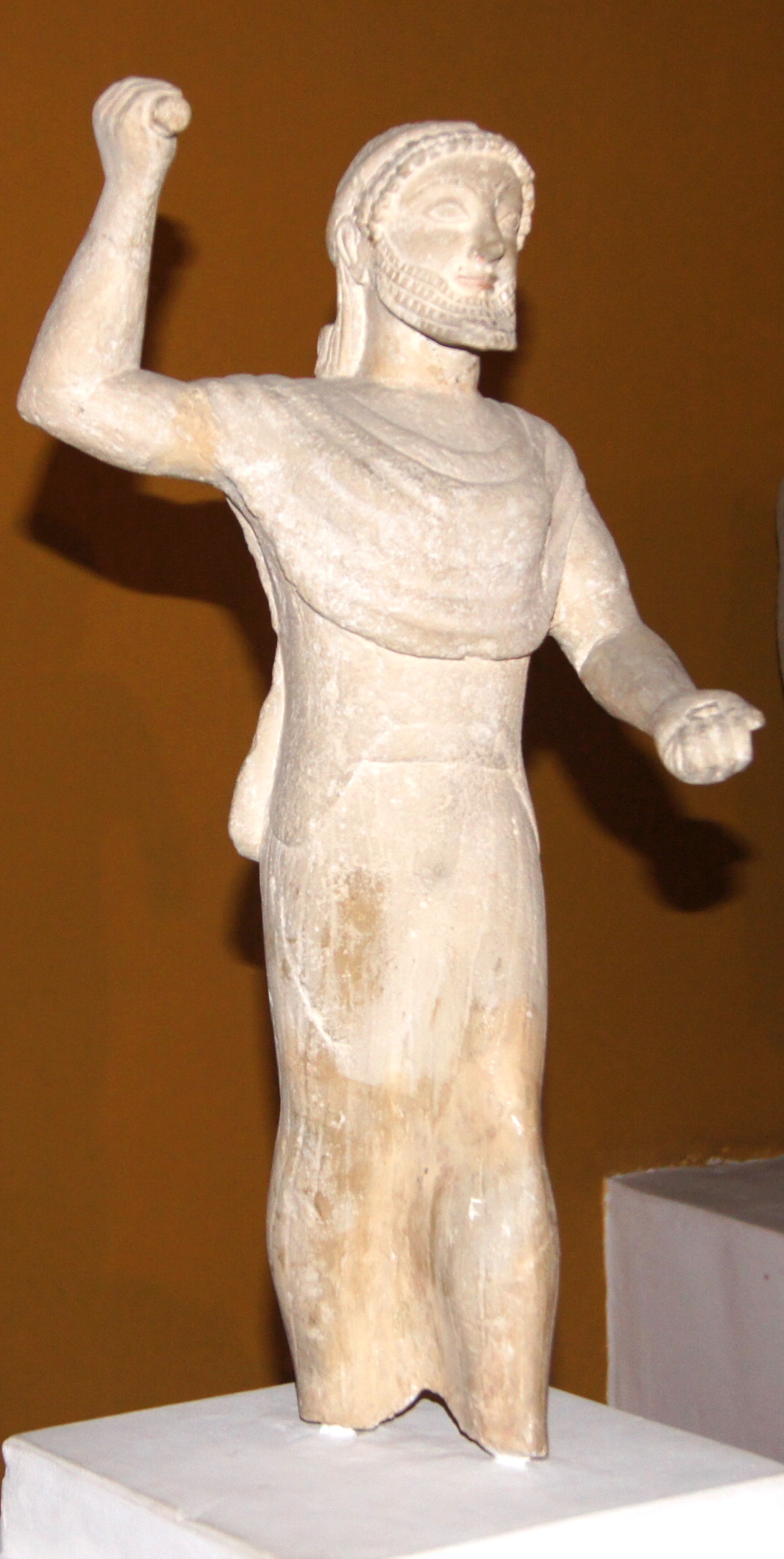
Zeus Keraunios, 500-480 BC, Nicosia museum

The oldest cemetery of Salamis has produced children's burials in Canaanite jars, indication of Phoenician presence already in the 11th century BC (LCIIIB). Similar jar burials have been found in cemeteries in Kourion-Kaloriziki and Palaepaphos-Skales near Kouklia. In Skales, many Levantine imports and Cypriot imitations of Levantine forms have been found and point to a Phoenician expansion even before the end of the 11th century BC.

== Ancient Cyprus ==
The Assyrians rediscovered Cyprus in the late eighth century BC, but did not establish lasting territorial control over the island. The Assyrian name for Cyprus, Iadnana, likely designated it as the "island of the Danunians," although its exact origins remain uncertain. A stela found in 1845 in Kition commemorates the victory of king Sargon II (721–705 BC) in 709 BC over the seven kings in the land of Ia', in the district of Iadnana or Atnana. There are other inscriptions referring to Ia' in Sargon's palace at Khorsabad. The ten kingdoms listed by an inscription of Esarhaddon in 673/672 BC have been identified as Salamis, Kition, Amathus, Kourion, Paphos and Soli on the coast and Tamassos, Ledra, Idalion and Chytri in the interior.

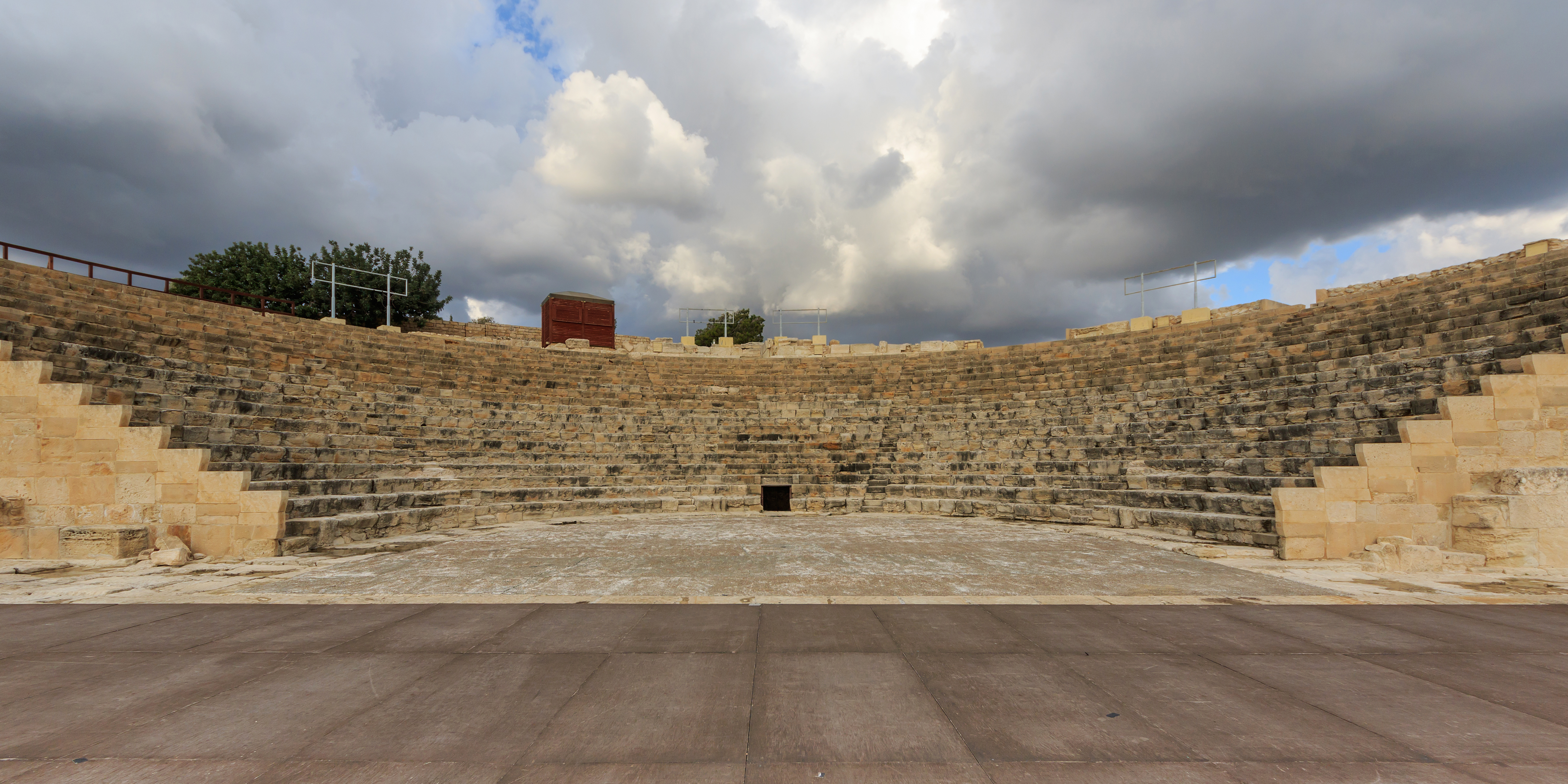
An ancient Greek theater in Kourion.

Cyprus gained independence for some time c. 669 BC but was conquered by Egypt under Amasis II (570–526/525 BC). The island was conquered by the Persians c. 545 BC under Cyrus the Great (559–530 BC). A Persian palace has been excavated in the territory of Marion on the North coast near Soli. The inhabitants took part in the Ionian rising. At the beginning of the 4th century BC, Euagoras I, King of Salamis, took control of the whole island and tried to gain independence from Persia. Another uprising took place in 350 BC but was crushed by Artaxerxes III in 344 BC.

During the siege of Tyre, the Cypriot kings went over to Alexander the Great. In 321 BC four Cypriot kings sided with Ptolemy I and defended the island against Antigonos. Ptolemy lost Cyprus to Demetrios Poliorketes between 306 and 295 BC, but after that it remained under Ptolemaic rule until 58 BC. It was ruled by a governor from Egypt and sometimes formed a minor Ptolemaic kingdom during the power-struggles of the 2nd and 1st centuries BC. Strong commercial relationships with Athens and Alexandria, two of the most important commercial centres of antiquity, developed.

Full Hellenisation only took place under Ptolemaic rule. Phoenician traits disappeared, together with the old Cypriot syllabic script. A number of cities were founded during this time, e.g. Arsinoe between Old Paphos (Palaepaphos) and Nea Paphos by Ptolemy II.

Cyprus became a Roman province in 58 BC, because, according to Strabo, the Roman politician, Publius Clodius Pulcher, held a grudge against the king of Cyprus, Ptolemy, and sent Marcus Cato to conquer the island after he had become tribune. Mark Antony gave the island to Cleopatra and her sister Arsinoe IV, but it became a Roman province again in 30 BC after his defeat at the Battle of Actium (31 BC). From 22 BC it was a senatorial province. The island suffered great losses during the Jewish uprising of 115/116 AD.

After the reforms of Diocletian it was placed under the control of the Consularis Oriens and governed by a proconsul. Several earthquakes led to the destruction of Salamis at the beginning of the 4th century, at the same time drought and famine hit the island.

== Medieval Cyprus ==
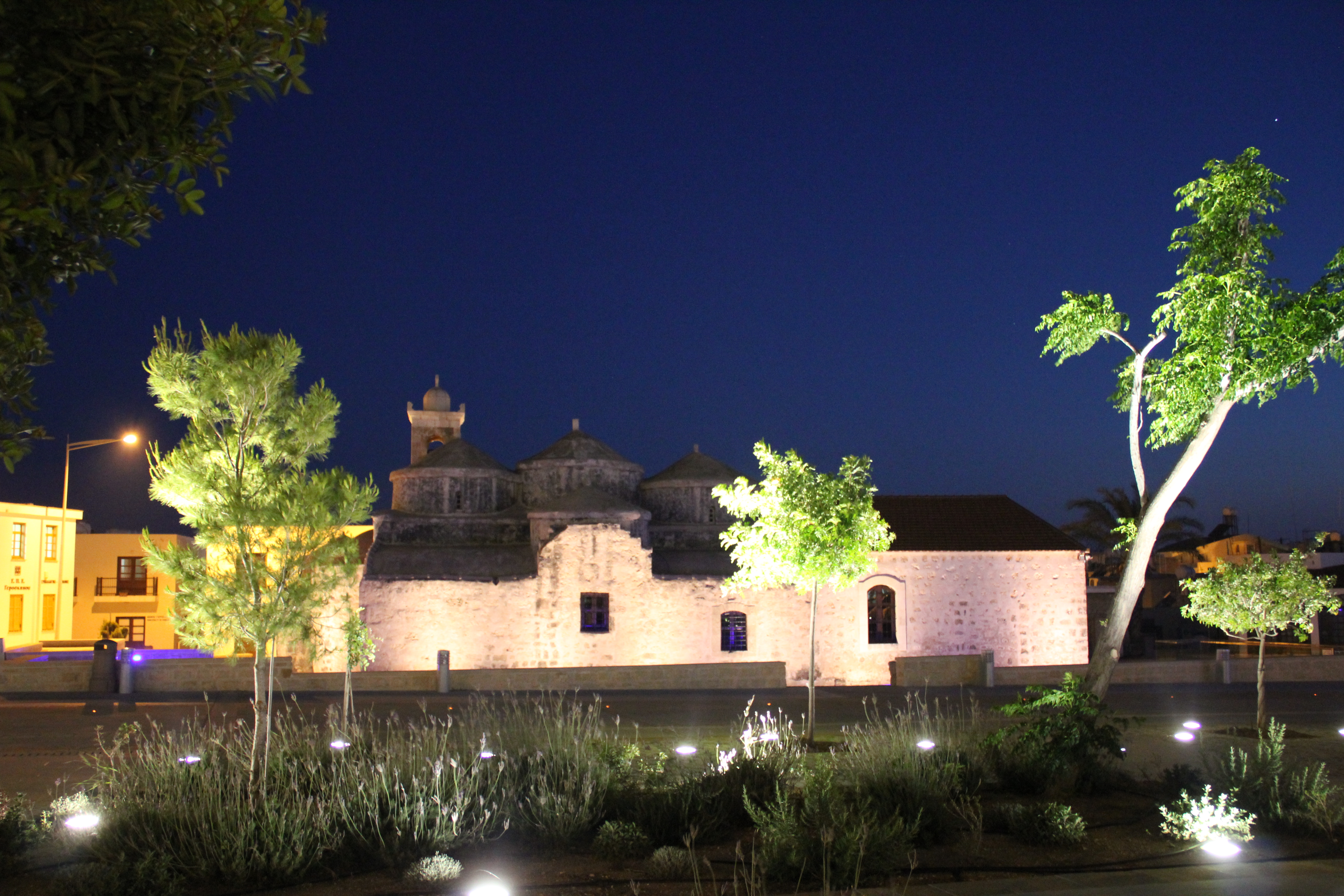
Ayia Paraskevi Byzantine church in Yeroskipou, Cyprus

Upon the division of the Roman Empire into eastern and western halves, Cyprus fell under Eastern Roman administration. At that time, its bishop, while still subject to the Christian Church, was made autocephalous by the First Council of Ephesus in 431.

The Arab Muslims invaded Cyprus in the 650s and conquered the island, but in 688, the Umayyad caliph Abd al-Malik ibn Marwan and the Byzantine emperor Justinian II reached an unprecedented agreement. For the next 300 years, Cyprus was ruled jointly by both the Arabs and the Byzantines as a condominium, despite the nearly constant warfare between the two parties on the mainland. The Arabs and the Byzantines both recovered control over the island for short periods thereafter, but the status quo was always restored.

This period lasted until 965, when Niketas Chalkoutzes conquered the island for the Byzantine Empire. In 1185, the last Byzantine governor of Cyprus, Isaac Komnenos, from a minor line of the Imperial house, rose in rebellion, and attempted to seize the throne. His coup was unsuccessful, but Comnenus retained control of the island. Byzantine actions against Comnenus failed because he enjoyed the support of William II of Sicily. The Byzantine emperor had an agreement with the sultan of Egypt to close Cypriot harbours to the Crusaders.

=== The Third Crusade ===
During the Third Crusade, the island of Cyprus became a target of the Crusaders in the late 12th century. Richard the Lionheart landed in Limassol on 1 June 1191 in search of his sister and his bride Berengaria, whose ship had become separated from the fleet in a storm. Richard's army landed when Isaac refused to return the hostages (Richard's sister, his bride, and several shipwrecked soldiers), and forced Isaac to flee from Limassol. He eventually surrendered, conceding control of the island to the King of England. Richard married Berengaria in Limassol on 12 May 1192; she was crowned as Queen of England by John Fitzluke, Bishop of Évreux. The Crusader fleet continued to St. Jean d'Acre on 5 June of the same year.

The army of Richard the Lionheart continued to occupy Cyprus and raised taxes. He sold the island to the Knights Templar. Soon after that, the French army under the House of Lusignan occupied the island, establishing the Kingdom of Cyprus in 1192. They declared Latin as the official language, later replacing it with French; much later, Greek was recognized as a second official language. In 1196, dioceses of the Latin Church were established on the island, and the Greek Orthodox Cypriot Church experienced a series of religious persecutions perpetrated by the Latin Catholics. Maronites settled on Cyprus during the Crusades and still maintain some villages in the North.

== Kingdom of Cyprus ==
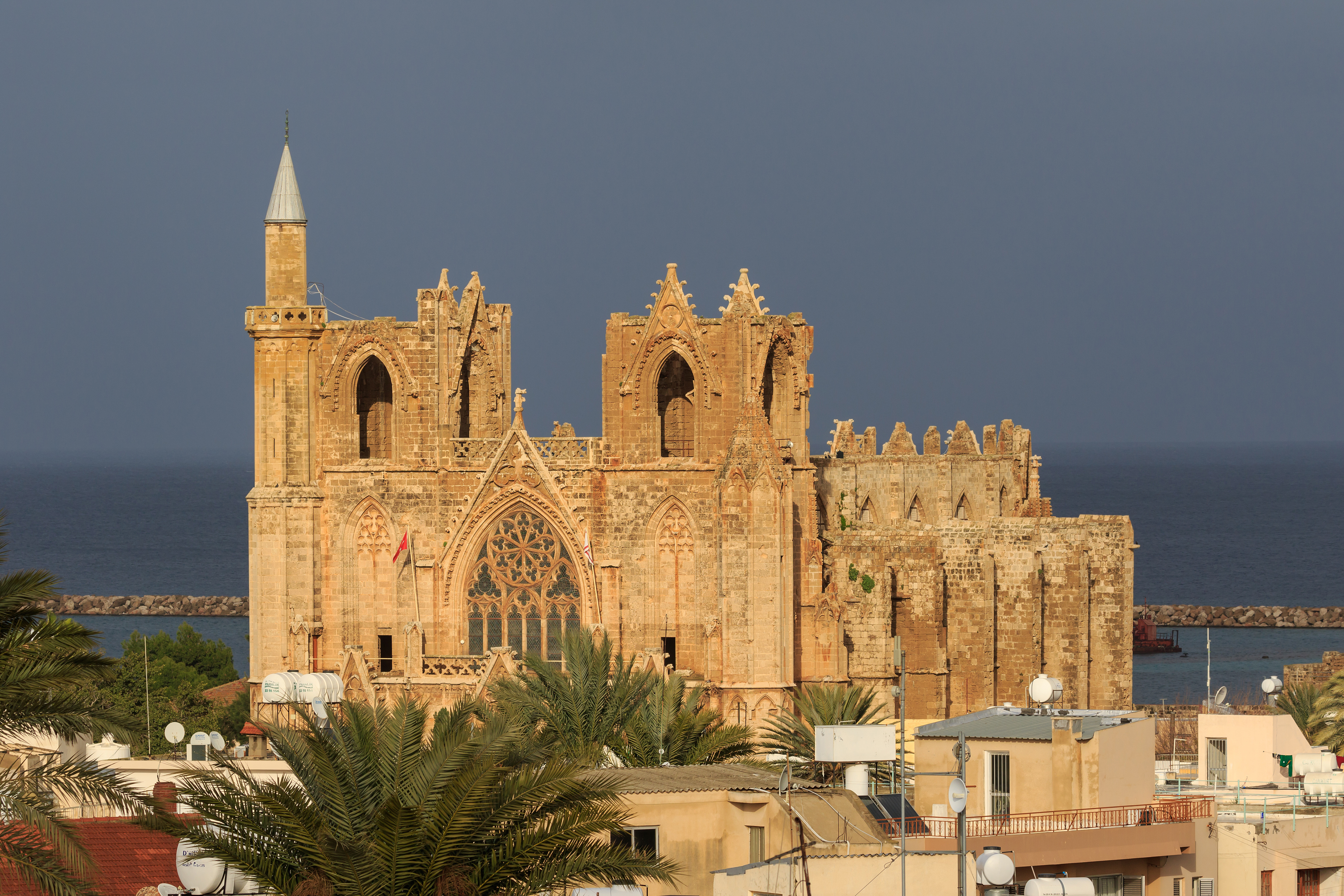
Cathedral of Saint Nicholas, consecrated in 1328, the largest medieval building in Famagusta, where the Kings of Cyprus were crowned also as Kings of Jerusalem. In 1571 having fallen to the Ottoman Empire it became the Mosque of Mağusa, and remains a mosque today

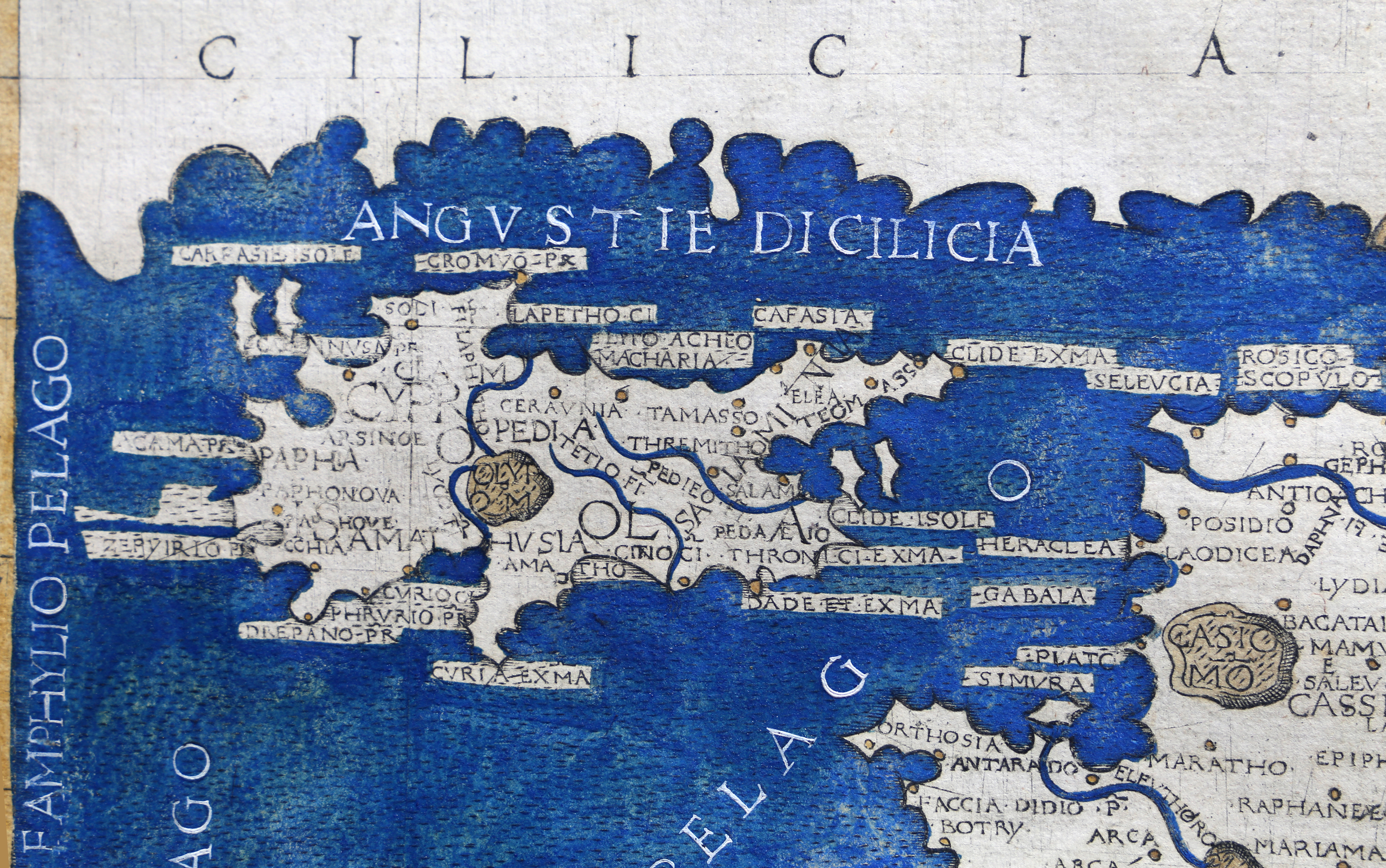
Cyprus in 1482

Amalric I of Cyprus (Aimery de Lusignan) received the royal crown and title from Henry VI, Holy Roman Emperor. A small minority Roman Catholic population of the island was mainly confined to some coastal cities, such as Famagusta, as well as inland Nicosia, the traditional capital. Roman Catholics kept the reins of power and control, while the Greek inhabitants lived in the countryside; this was much the same as the arrangement in the Kingdom of Jerusalem. The independent Eastern Orthodox Church of Cyprus, with its own archbishop and subject to no patriarch, was allowed to remain on the island, but the Latin Church largely displaced it in stature and holding property.

After the death of Amalric of Lusignan, the Kingdom continually passed to a series of young boys who grew up as king. The Ibelin family, which had held much power in Jerusalem prior its downfall, acted as regents during these early years. In 1229 one of the Ibelin regents was forced out of power by Frederick II, Holy Roman Emperor, who brought the struggle between the Guelphs and Ghibellines to the island.

Frederick's supporters were defeated in this struggle by 1233, although it lasted longer in the Kingdom of Jerusalem and in the Holy Roman Empire. Frederick's Hohenstaufen descendants continued to rule as kings of Jerusalem until 1268 when Hugh III of Cyprus (d.1284) of the Lusignan family claimed the title and its territory of Acre for himself upon the death of Conrad III of Jerusalem, thus uniting the two kingdoms. The territory in Palestine was finally lost while Henry II was king in 1291, but the kings of Cyprus continued to claim the title.

Like Jerusalem, Cyprus had an Haute Cour (High Court), although it was less powerful than it had been in Jerusalem. The island was richer and more feudal than Jerusalem, so the king had more personal wealth and could afford to ignore the Haute Cour. The most important vassal family was the multi-branch House of Ibelin. However, the king was often in conflict with the Italian merchants, especially because Cyprus had become the centre of European trade with Africa and Asia after the fall of Acre in 1291.

The kingdom eventually came to be dominated more and more in the 14th century by the Genoese merchants. Cyprus therefore sided with the Avignon Papacy in the Western Schism, in the hope that the French would be able to drive out the Italians. The Mameluks then made the kingdom a tributary state in 1426; the remaining monarchs gradually lost almost all independence, until 1489 when the last Queen, Catherine Cornaro, was forced to sell the island to Venice. Ottomans started raiding Cyprus immediately afterwards, and captured it in 1571.

This is the historical setting to Shakespeare's Othello, the play's title character being the commander of the Venetian garrison defending Cyprus against the Ottomans.

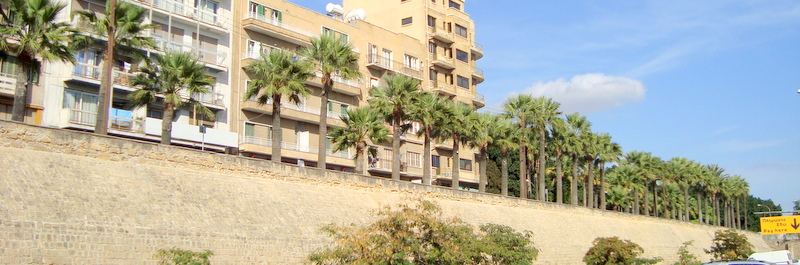
Venetian walls of Nicosia.

== Ottoman Cyprus ==
=== Cyprus 1571 ===
In 1571, Cyprus became an Eyalet, a province, of the Ottoman Empire until 1878. In 1571, the Turks entered the country in order of the Ottoman–Venetian War (1570–1573), also known as the Fourth Ottoman - Venetian War, or the War of Cyprus. Following the Ottoman Empire's invasion of Cyprus with 350-400 ships and 60,000-100,000 soldiers to take control of the island, Turks and Cypriots coexisted on the island. Cyprus was rich in salt, sugar, cotton, grains, and other import and export goods at that time, in addition it was also a transfer country for the Syria-Venice trade. As a result, Cyprus served as the eastern Mediterranean's main emporium for Venice's maritime trade.

After the Venetians lost control and the Ottomans gained control over Cyprus, Venice continued to use Cyprus for trading. Merchants that were imprisoned during the war were released and had their goods and ships returned to them. The trade continued and was only interrupted during wars. There were also Venetian consuls present in Cyprus to stabilize trade and protect the traders. The government of Cyprus used to borrow money from Venician merchants in the early 16th century. Until the end of Ottoman rule on Cyprus, the trade continued with being held during the times of war.

=== Religion and culture under Ottoman rule ===
The Ottoman Empire was a predominantly Muslim state, but it governed a religiously diverse population through established administrative practices rather than through immediate cultural or religious confrontation. After the Ottoman conquest of Cyprus in 1571, the island’s population consisted primarily of Greek Orthodox Christians, alongside smaller communities of Muslims, Latins (Catholics), and others.

To manage this diversity, the Ottomans applied the millet system, under which recognized religious communities were granted a degree of autonomy in matters such as worship, family law, and communal leadership. In Cyprus, the Orthodox Church was formally recognized and assumed an important administrative role over the Christian population, contributing to social stability under Ottoman rule.

Although Muslim settlement on the island increased following the conquest, the Ottoman authorities did not pursue a policy of systematic forced Islamization. Conversion to Islam occurred gradually and for a variety of social and economic reasons, while the majority of the population remained Christian throughout the Ottoman period.

Practices such as female head covering were not unique to Islam in this period. Christian women in Cyprus, particularly married women, also commonly covered their hair, in accordance with longstanding Christian teaching and broader Mediterranean norms of modesty and social order. As a result, women’s dress did not constitute a clear cultural boundary between Muslims and Christians, but instead reflected shared regional customs shaped by religion, tradition, and social expectations.

=== Change of administration of Cyprus ===
After 1670, the Ottomans shifted their governance of Cyprus and its significance multiple times: from a sanjak (sub-province) to a Grand Vizier's fief, to an eyalet, back to a fief, and finally back to a sanjak.

| From | To | Type of administration |
|---|---|---|
| 1670 | 1703 | A sanjak of the Eyalet of the Archipelago |
| 1703 | 1745 | A fief of the Grand Vizier |
| 1745 | 1748 | An eyalet (province) |
| 1748 | 1784 | A fief of the Grand Vizier |
| 1784 | ... | A sanjak of the Eyalet of the Archipelago |

=== Cyprus 1878 (Russo-Turkish War) ===
During the Russo-Turkish War in the Mediterranean Cyprus prepared for the invasion which occurred and left the population with financial issues for the decades to come. The Russians had been spreading propaganda in the Mediterranean which called upon Orthodox Greek Christians to fight against the Ottoman Empire. Cyprus was trying to balance between supporting the Ottoman Empire with grain but on the other hand they tried not to oppose Russia.

The Russo-Turkish War ended the Ottoman control of Cyprus in 1878. Cyprus then came under the control of the British Empire with its conditions set out in the Cyprus Convention between the United Kingdom and Ottoman Empire. However, the sovereignty of the island continued to be maintained by the Ottoman Empire until Great Britain annexed the island unilaterally in 1914, after it declared war against the Ottomans during the First World War. Following World War I, under the provisions of the Lausanne Treaty, Turkey relinquished all claims and rights on Cyprus.

Under British rule, the island began to enjoy a period of increased freedom of speech, something which allowed further development of the Greek Cypriots' ideas of enosis (unification with Greece).

== Modern Cyprus ==
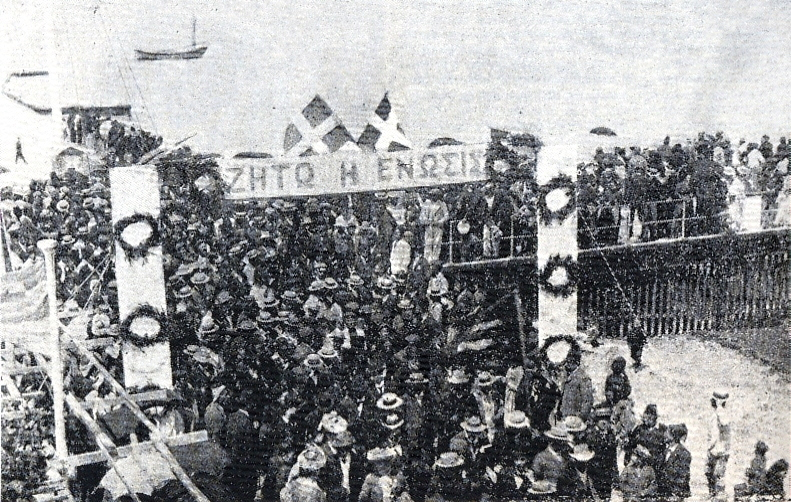
Cypriot demonstrations for Enosis (Union) with Greece.

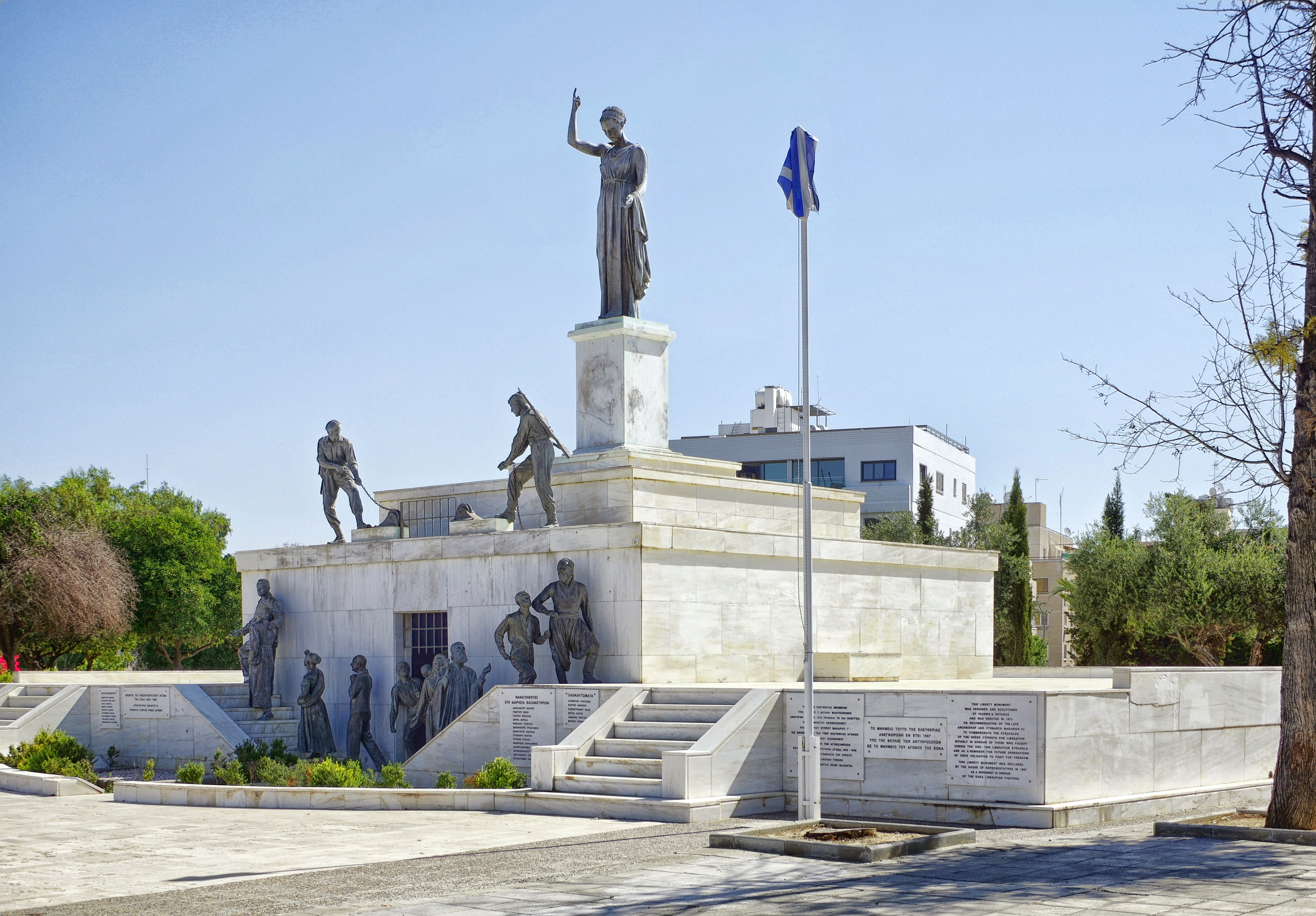
Statue of Liberty symbolising the independence of Cyprus.

In 1878, as the result of the Cyprus Convention, the United Kingdom took over the government of Cyprus as a protectorate from the Ottoman Empire. In 1914, at the beginning of World War I, the Ottomans declared war on Britain, leading to the British annexation of Cyprus.

The island's population welcomed the arrival of the British in 1878, as it meant the end of the long Turkish occupation, on the one hand, but also because (bearing in mind the example of the Ionian Islands) it was believed to be a necessary transitional stage for the final purpose, which was the return of Cyprus to Greece. In the 1920s, the political leaders of the Cypriot Greeks decided to adopt a change of tactics in their pursuit of enosis—the union of Cyprus with Greece. Instead of the uncompromising course for "union and only union", it was decided that, under the circumstances, some civil liberties could be negotiated and won in favour of the Cypriot people. In 1921, the Political Organisation of Cyprus was formed to serve that purpose, but was dissolved later that decade.

Greek Cypriot representatives were repeatedly sent to England over the years to formally set the request to the colonial metropolis, but to no avail whatsoever. The participation of Greek Cypriots in the national struggles of the Greeks (such as in the wars at the end of the 19th century and in the Balkan wars of 1912–13) was an expression of their belief in the common origin of Greeks and Cypriots, in a common fate and a common path. The participation of Greek Cypriot volunteers in the First World War was an expression of the belief that there would be a "Cypriot share" in the "distribution of profits" after the victory (something that also happened later, during the Second World War). Besides, the Greek Prime Minister, Eleftherios Venizelos, had negotiated the handing over of Cyprus to Greece, in the years leading to the First World War. However, during the "distribution of profits" at the Paris conference after the First World War, there was no "Cypriot share" despite the Greek Cypriot leadership's presence and efforts. After the Treaty of Lausanne (1923), by which Turkey renounced all its rights over Cyprus, some new hopes were born because a very serious obstacle to the return of Cyprus to Greece was removed. However, in 1925, following the dissolution of the Ottoman Empire, and with the removal of this obstacle, England proceeded not to cede Cyprus to Greece but to annex it by declaring the island a Crown Colony. It had then become absolutely clear to the Greek Cypriots, from English officials (such as the Colonial Secretary Leo Amery) that unification was out of the question, and that this subject was definitively closed, rebutting the hopes and expectations of the Greek Cypriots for achieving their ideal.

The National Organization of Cyprus (EOK; not to be confused with EOKA), that was founded in 1930 by church circles and whose members were chosen by the Archbishop, played a role in strengthening the demand of enosis. Its purpose was the pursuit of this goal and the rejection of the Autonomy proposed by the English. In 1931, the even more hardline National Radical Union of the Center (ΕRΕΚ) was founded whose members were secret. The repetitive rebuttal of the Greek Cypriots' hopes, along with other political events at the time, triggered the great uprising of October 1931, known as the October riots. Cyprus thus entered a period of autocratic rule known as Palmerokratia ("Palmerocracy"), named after governor Richmond Palmer, which started shortly before the revolt and would last until the beginning of World War II.

=== 1950 onwards ===
In January 1950, the Orthodox Church of Cyprus organized the Union Referendum (referendum about Enosis), in which Greek Cypriots, which constituted around 80% of the population at the time, were called to vote, and ended in strong favor for the movement. However, their shout fell on deaf ears since the international community showed no desire to support their request Between 1955 and 1959 Greek Cypriots formed the EOKA organisation, led by George Grivas, and began the liberation struggle with ultimate goal being enosis. However the EOKA campaign did not result in union with Greece but rather in an independent republic, the Republic of Cyprus, in 1960.

The 1960 constitution put in place a form of power-sharing, or consociational government, in which concessions were made to the Turkish Cypriots minority, including as a requirement that the vice-president of Cyprus and at least 30% of members of parliament be Turkish Cypriots. Archbishop Makarios III would be the President and Dr. Fazıl Küçük would become vice president. One of the articles in the constitution was the creation of separate local municipalities so that Greek and Turkish Cypriots could manage their own municipalities in large towns.

Internal conflicts turned into full-fledged armed fighting between the two communities on the island, which prompted the United Nations to send peacekeeping forces in 1964; these forces are still in place today. In 1974, Greek nationalists performed a military coup with the support of the military junta in Greece. Unable to secure multilateral support against the coup, Turkey invaded the northern portion of the island. Turkish forces remained after a cease-fire, resulting in the partition of the island. The intercommunal violence, the coup, and the subsequent invasion led to the displacement of hundreds of thousands of Cypriots.

The de facto state of Northern Cyprus was proclaimed in 1975 under the name of the Turkish Federated State of Cyprus. The name was changed to its present form, the Turkish Republic of Northern Cyprus, on 15 November 1983. Recognised only by Turkey, Northern Cyprus is considered by the international community to be part of the Republic of Cyprus.

In 2002, UN Secretary General Kofi Annan started a new round of negotiations for the unification of the island. In 2004, after long negotiations between both sides, a plan for unification of the island emerged. The resulting plan was supported by the United Nations, the European Union, and the United States. The nationalists on both sides campaigned for the rejection of the plan, the result being that Turkish Cypriots accepted the plan while Greek Cypriots rejected it overwhelmingly.

After Cyprus became a member of the European Union in 2004, it adopted the euro as its currency on 1 January 2008, replacing the previously used Cypriot pound; Northern Cyprus continued to use the Turkish lira.

The political environment is dominated by the communist AKEL, the liberal conservative Democratic Rally, the centrist Democratic Party and the social-democratic EDEK. In 2008, Dimitris Christofias became the country's first Communist head of state. Due to his involvement in the 2012–13 Cypriot financial crisis, Christofias did not run for re-election in 2013. The presidential election in 2013 resulted in Democratic Rally candidate Nicos Anastasiades winning 57.48% of the vote. As a result, Anastasiades was sworn in on 28 February 2013. Anastasiades was re-elected with 56% of the vote in the 2018 presidential election. On 28 February 2023, Nikos Christodoulides, the winner of the 2023 presidential election run-off, was sworn in as the eighth president of the Republic of Cyprus.

== See also ==
- Kingdom of Cyprus
- Timeline of Cypriot history
- Conquests of Cyprus

General:

- History of Europe
