= Demetris Christofias =

President of Cyprus from 2008 to 2013

- Δημήτρης Χριστόφιας
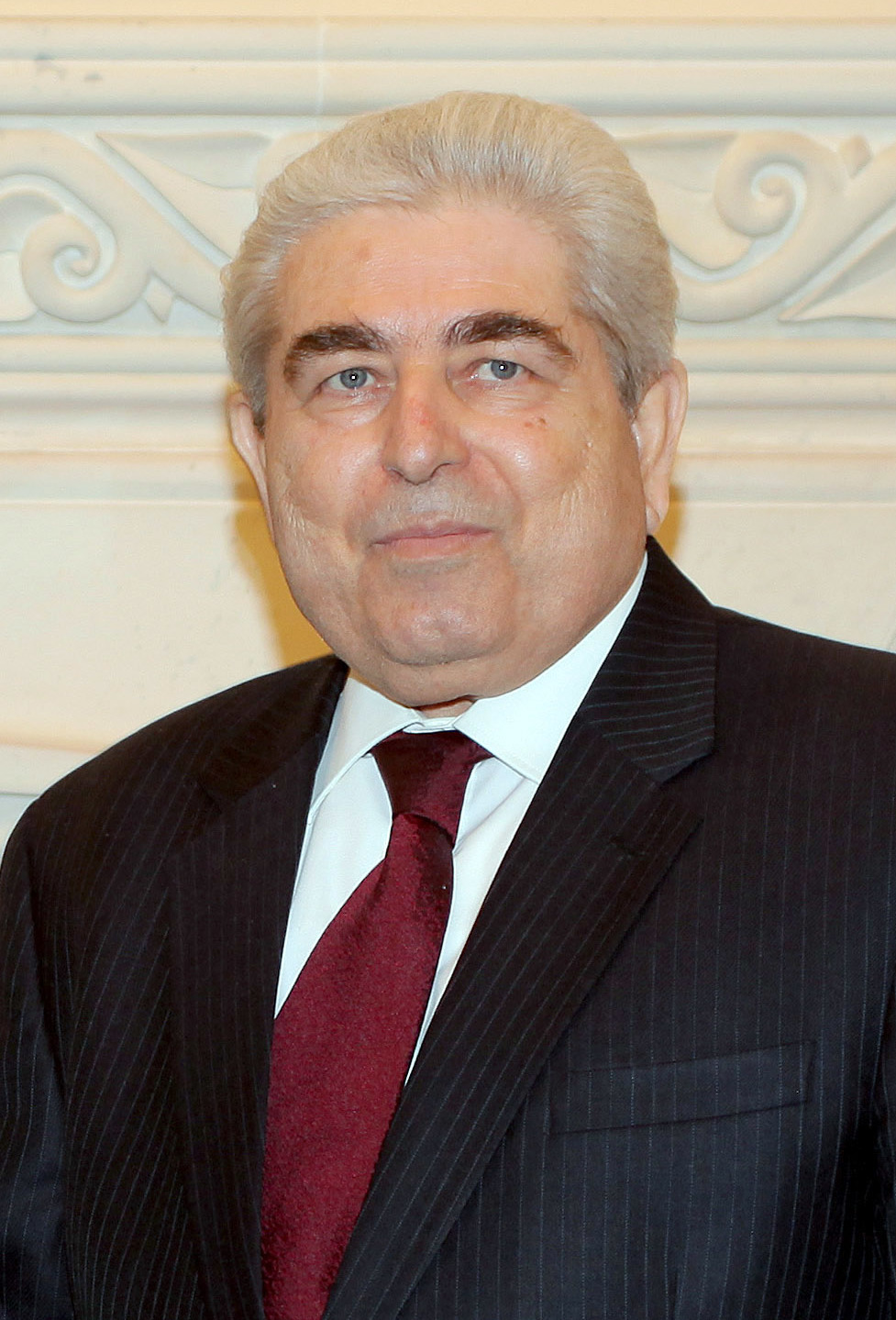
- Christofias in 2011

6th President of Cyprus
- In office 28 February 2008 – 28 February 2013
- Preceded by: Tassos Papadopoulos
- Succeeded by: Nicos Anastasiades

9th President of the House of Representatives
- In office 7 June 2001 – 28 February 2008
- Preceded by: Spyros Kyprianou
- Succeeded by: Marios Garoyian

4th General Secretary of the Progressive Party of Working People
- In office 22 April 1988 – 21 February 2009
- Preceded by: Ezekias Papaioannou
- Succeeded by: Andros Kyprianou

Personal details
- Born: 29 August 1946 Kato Dikomo, British Cyprus
- Died: 21 June 2019 (aged 72) Nicosia, Cyprus
- Party: Progressive Party of Working People
- Spouse: Elsie Chiratou (m. 1972)
- Children: 3
- Education: PhD

Demetris Christofias (Note: Sometimes spelled "Dimitris Christofias".) (Greek: Δημήτρης Χριστόφιας [ðiˈmitɾis xɾiˈstofças]; 29 August 1946 – 21 June 2019) was a Cypriot politician, who served as President of Cyprus from 2008 to 2013. He was previously President of the House of Representatives from 2001 to 2008 and General Secretary of the Progressive Party of Working People from 1988 to 2009.

Taking on the challenge of responding to the 2008 financial crisis, he implemented a wide-ranging social program, increasing pensions and the minimum wage. At the end of his term, however, the 2012–2013 Cypriot financial crisis led to a collapse in the banking system. Putting blame on the banks, he attempted to raise taxes on them as a way of funding the island's recovery, but failed to pass this into legislation. Also citing deadlock in reunification talks, he announced that he would not seek re-election, becoming the first Cypriot leader to opt out of running for a second term. He remains the only communist head of state in the history of both Cyprus and the European Union.

== Early life ==
Demetris Christofias was born on 29 August 1946 in Kato Dikomo, British Cyprus, to a Greek Cypriot family. He had a sister who once donated her kidney to him for a life-saving kidney transplant. He received his high school education at Nicosia Commercial Lyceum, from which he graduated in 1964. He spent five years in Moscow, where he earned a PhD in history from the Russian Academy of Sciences.

== Career ==
=== Pre-presidential work ===
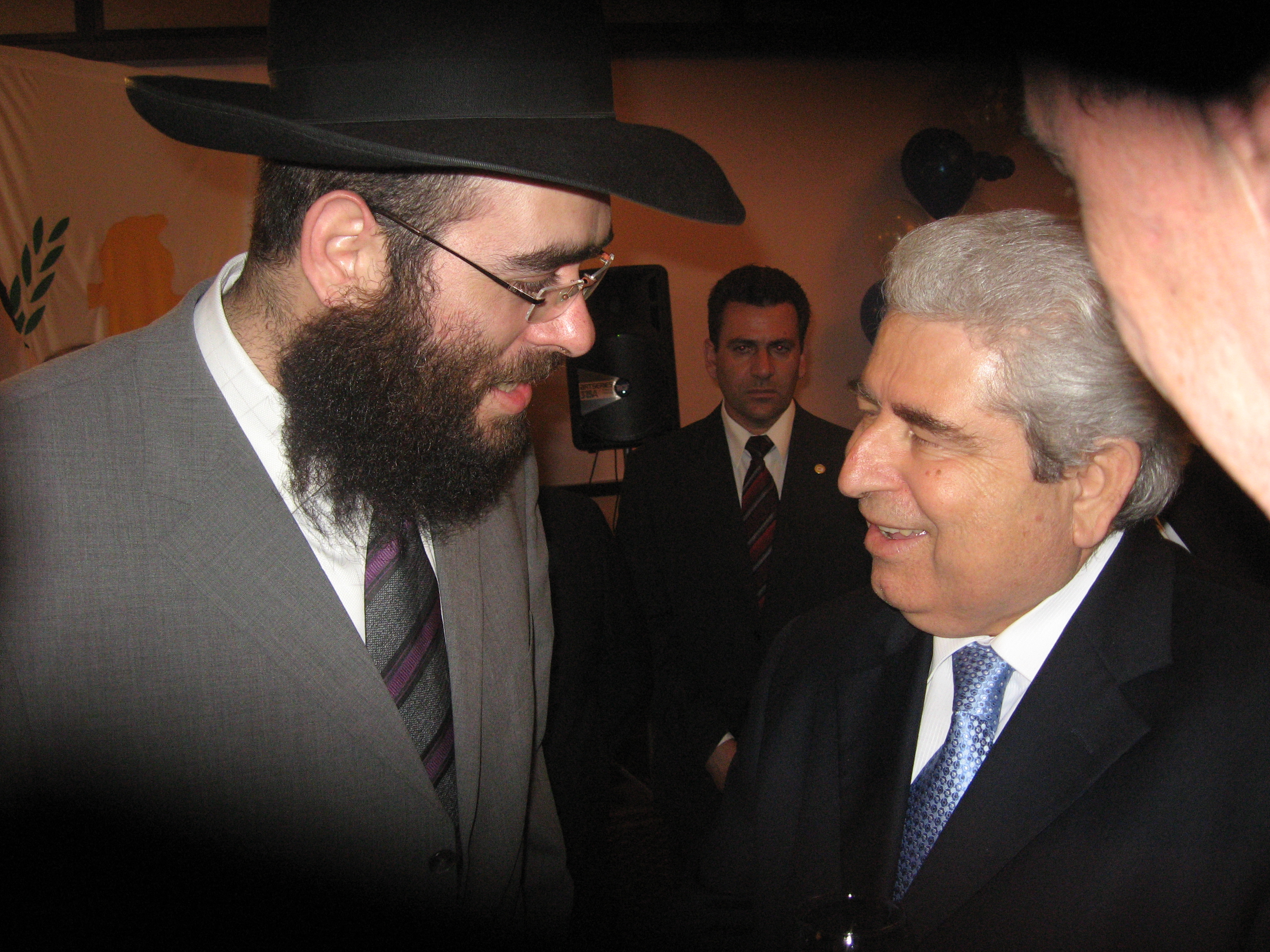
Christofias with Rabbi Arie Zeev Raskin in 2008

At the age of 14, Christofias joined PEOM, a progressive high school student organisation. At the age of 18, he joined PEO Trade Unions and the Progressive Party of Working People's youth branch United Democratic Youth Organisation. In 1969, at the 5th Congress of EDON, he was elected member of the Central Council.

In 1974, Christofias was elected Central Organising Secretary of EDON and in 1977, General Secretary. He served in the latter post until 1987. In 1976 he was elected as a member of the Nicosia-Kyrenia District Committee of AKEL, and in 1982 – at the 15th Congress of AKEL – he was elected as a member of the Central Committee of the Party.

In July 1986, Christofias was elected as an alternate member of the Political Bureau of AKEL. After the 16th Congress of AKEL, held in November 1986, he was elected as a full member of the Political Bureau, and in 1987 (after terminating his service as General Secretary of EDON) he was elected as a member of the AKEL Secretariat. In April 1988, following the death of Ezekias Papaioannou, he was elected as General Secretary of AKEL, a post he held until 2009.

Christofias was elected as a Member of the House of Representatives for the first time in 1991 and was re-elected in the subsequent parliamentary elections of 1996 and 2001. On 7 June 2001, he was elected as President of the House of Representatives. He was re-elected as President of the House of Representatives in 2006. In his function as General Secretary of AKEL and President of the House of Representatives, he was a Member of the National Council, a supreme advisory body to the President of the Republic.

Christofias was ex-officio chairman of the House Standing Committee on Selection and chairman of the ad hoc House Standing Committee on Rules of Procedure and of the Special House Standing Committee on Declaration and Examination of Property. He was also president of the executive committees of the Cyprus group to the Inter-Parliamentary Union and of the Cyprus branch of the Commonwealth Parliamentary Association.

=== Presidency ===
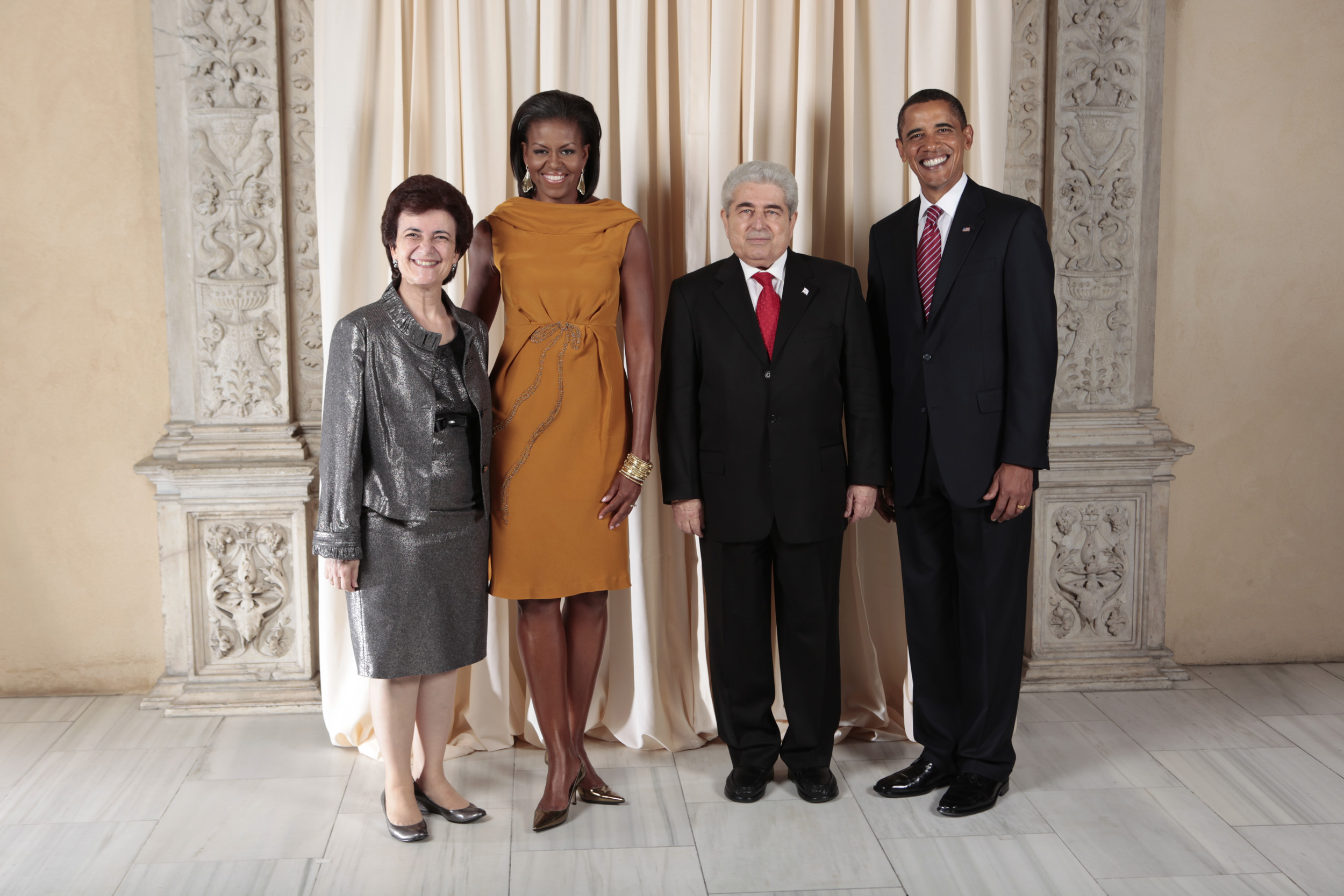
Christofias and Chiratou with U.S. President Barack Obama and Michelle Obama in 2009

The first round of the February 2008 presidential election, held on 17 February, saw a close result between the three leading candidates—Christofias, Ioannis Kasoulides of DISY, and the incumbent Tassos Papadopoulos—Christofias narrowly placing second with 33.3% of the vote, behind Kasoulidis with 33.5%. Christofias and Kasoulidis participated in a second round on 24 February, for which Christofias received the backing of Papadopoulos's party DIKO. Christofias went on to win the election with 53.37% of the vote. After his success, he stated his support for the closure of Cyprus' British military bases and pledged to restart talks to find a solution to the Cyprus problem. Addressing a crowd in Nicosia, he said he looked forward to "substantial cooperation for the benefit of both communities".

Christofias was sworn in as president at a ceremony in the House of Representatives on 28 February 2008, vowing that "the solution of the Cyprus problem will be the top priority of [his] government". Although he was proud to be a communist, he said he would leave the free market economy alone. While much of the focus outside of Cyprus was on his communist background and education in Moscow, voters were more concerned with a solution to the Cyprus problem.

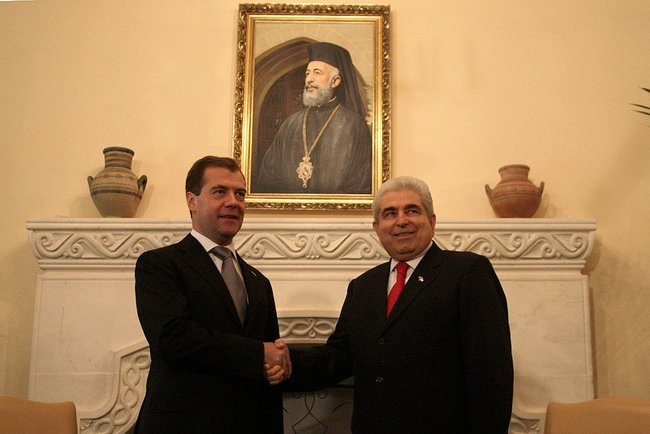
Christofias with Russian President Dmitry Medvedev in 2010

Christofias appointed his government on 29 February 2008. His first government was a coalition between his own party AKEL, Marios Garoyian's Democratic Party and Yiannakis Omirou's Movement for Social Democracy. Christofias started talks with Mehmet Ali Talat on the reunification of Cyprus as a bizonal federal state, but his hopes for Greek Cypriot approval of such a plan were soon scotched by the nationalists' victory in Northern Cyprus' 2009 parliamentary elections.

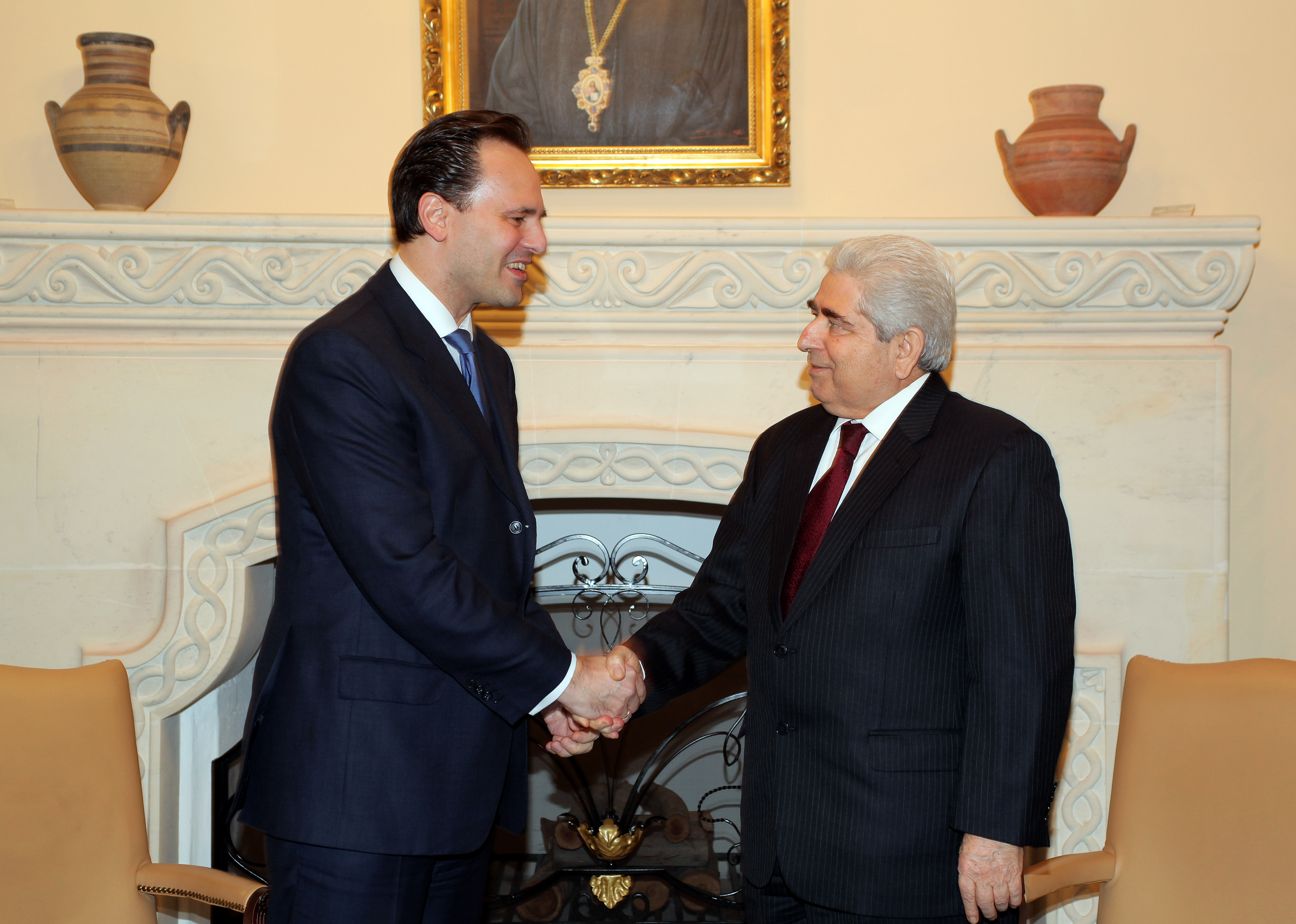
Christofias with Greek Foreign Minister Dimitrios Droutsas in 2011

During this tenure as president, Christofias vowed to resume negotiations for the reunification of the island, making it one of the top priorities of his administration. Although his efforts did not lead to reunification, progress was made as ambulances and workers were able to cross the border, trade developed, and confidence-building measures were set in place.

He increased the minimum wage and pensions at the beginning of his term, but his social policy was stopped when the Cypriot banking system collapsed as a result of the 2012–2013 Cypriot financial crisis. The European Union then only agreed to grant an aid package in exchange for a policy of economic austerity, which Christofias never signed. He tried to limit the crisis with a €2.5 billion loan from Russia, while opposing the privatization scheme. He also found himself confronted in parliament, where his party held only one third of seats, with the majority of other politicians refusing his proposal to increase taxes on the banks responsible for the crisis.'

Christofias announced on 14 May 2012 he would not seek re-election for a second term in the next year, citing a deadlock in talks on the island's reunification. He left office on 28 February 2013, following the presidential elections, and remains the only Cypriot president not to seek re-election.

=== Controversies ===
==== Mari Naval Base explosion ====
On 28 July 2011, Cyprus's cabinet tendered its resignation bowing to political and public pressure after a massive munitions blast at Evangelos Florakis Naval Base on 11 July 2011. Several thousand people upset by the Cypriot government's failure to dispose of the explosives had held a demonstration in the capital Nicosia on 12 July, demanding the resignation of Christofias.

On 3 October 2011, the results of the investigation regarding the Evangelos Florakis Naval Base explosion were released to the public, placing the blame for the incident mainly on President Christofias, holding him “personally and institutionally responsible” for the blast. Christofias rejected the results of the investigation and denied any personal responsibility for the tragedy.

Six days later, the police report, "prepared by head of CID at police HQ", recommended the prosecution of 12 people; the police rejected claims they were trying to protect the Presidential palace officials with their report, instead asserting that the "police perform their duties “impartially and objectively”". The police also report that they "carefully avoided saying who and how many we propose to take to court, because the final word on who will be brought to justice rests with the AG...in no way did we want to stigmatise someone who the AG may later judge there is insufficient evidence to prosecute”. Although the state investigation concluded that he should have been arrested and charged, the Attorney General did no such thing.

== Personal life ==
Christofias met Elsie Chiratou while studying in Moscow, and they returned to Cyprus together before marrying in 1972. They had a son named Christos and two daughters named Marianna and Christina.

Christofias described himself as an atheist, which was unprecedented by a Cypriot political leader due to the island's overwhelmingly Greek Orthodox outlook. In addition to his native Greek, he was fluent in Russian. He had limited English proficiency.

== Death ==
After experiencing acute respiratory problems, Christofias was hospitalised at Nicosia General Hospital on 20 May 2019. He died on 21 June, aged 72. A period of national mourning was later announced, and a state funeral was held.

== Honours and awards ==
- Austria: Grand Decoration of Honour in Gold with Sash of the Decoration of Honour for Services to the Republic of Austria (10 May 2007)
- Russia: Medal of Pushkin (10 December 2007)
- Russia: Order of Friendship (30 August 2010)
- Russia: Jubilee Medal "70 Years of Victory in the Great Patriotic War 1941–1945" (31 May 2015)
- Greece: Grand Collar of the Order of the Redeemer (2008)
- Greek Orthodox Patriarchate of Alexandria: Knight Grand Cross of the Order of Saint Mark (9 April 2009)
- Cuba: Order of José Martí (28 September 2009)
- Holy See: Grand Collar of the Order of Pope Pius IX (2010)
- Syria: Grand Collar of the Order of the Unity of the Nation (4 November 2010)
- Ukraine: First Class of the Order of Prince Yaroslav the Wise (4 July 2011)
- Lebanon: Grand Cordon of the National Order of the Cedar (2012)
- Sovereign Military Order of Malta: Order pro Merito Melitensi (25 October 2012)
- Serbia: Grand Cross of the Order of the Republic of Serbia (30 January 2013)

== Notes ==
Party political offices
Preceded by Ezekias Papaioannou	General Secretary of the Progressive Party of Working People; 1988–2009	Succeeded by Andros Kyprianou
Political offices
Preceded by Spyros Kyprianou	President of the House of Representatives; 2001–2008	Succeeded by Marios Garoyian
Preceded by Tassos Papadopoulos	President of Cyprus; 2008–2013	Succeeded by Nicos Anastasiades
