= Cyprus Red Cross =

Red Cross national society in Cyprus

Cyprus Red Cross Society
- Abbreviation: CRCS
- Founded: 1950
- Type: Non-profit organisation
- Purpose: Humanitarian Aid
- Location: Cyprus
- Affiliations: International Committee of the Red Cross; International Federation of Red Cross and Red Crescent Societies

The Cyprus Red Cross Society (CRCS; Greek: Κυπριακός Ερυθρός Σταυρός, romanized: Kypriakós Erythrós Stavrós) is the only Red Cross society in Cyprus recognised by the International Red Cross and Red Crescent Movement. The Headquarters of the Society are located in Nicosia.

Since 2004, the President of the Cyprus Red Cross has been Fotini Papadopoulos, daughter of Anastasios George Leventis and wife of former President of Cyprus Tassos Papadopoulos

== History ==
The Cyprus Red Cross was created in 1950, while Cyprus was under British rule, as a voluntary aid society and was originally operating as a branch of the British Red Cross; it was later evolved into the Cyprus Red Cross Society after the independence of Cyprus from the United Kingdom and the establishment of the Republic of Cyprus in 1960. After the Independence of Cyprus, the society was recognised by the Cyprus Red Cross law of 1967 as the National Red Cross Society of Cyprus.

Cyprus Red Cross is a properly constituted National Society, recognised as an auxiliary to the public authorities in the humanitarian field by the Government of the Republic of Cyprus, where the four Geneva Conventions are in force. Cyprus Red Cross is an autonomous body directed by its Central Committee, operating under the Cyprus Red Cross Law of 1967 and its own statutes and in conformity with the fundamental principles of the Red Cross and Red Crescent Movement.

The Society, was recognised by the International Committee of the Red Cross (ICRC) on 23 February 2012, and admitted in the International Federation of the Red Cross and Red Crescent Societies (IFRC), in accordance with the terms defined in the Constitution and Rules of Procedure of the International Federation, on 12 November 2013; it constitutes the 188th member of the International Red Cross and Red Crescent Movement.

== Organisation ==
The main authorities of the SRCS are the General Assembly, the Council and the Executive Committee, which are responsible for the policy and overall administration. It has 6 branches, one for each district, namely:

- Nicosia
- Larnaca
- Paphos
- Kyrenia
- Famagusta
- Limassol

In addition, the Society has a Youth Section which was established in 1973.

== Activities ==
The Cyprus Red Cross carries out a wide spectrum of activities, primarily based on volunteers from all segments of society, in response to vulnerabilities among people in Cyprus and abroad, ranging from alleviation of the hardships of those internally displaced as a result of the 1974 invasion, day-to-day response to local disasters and social hardship, to public information about new and re-emerging threats to health.

Highlights:

- The "Stella Soulioti" Children Therapy Centre (formerly known as the Home for Sick Children)
- Blood donation
- General humanitarian activities
- Disaster Relief Emergency Scheme
- Dissemination of Red Cross principles and protection of the Red Cross emblem
- Aid to victims of armed conflicts and natural disasters in other countries
- Fundraising

== The Cyprus Red Cross Youth Section ==
Members of the Cyprus Red Cross Youth Section (CRCYS) participate in all of the Cyprus Red Cross activities but are especially active in the following projects:

Services to Society

- Blood Donation – blood donation groups are organised within the secondary schools and contribute a substantial proportion of the needs in blood in Cyprus.
- The Red Cross Children Therapy Centre – the centre is warmly embraced by the youth section by offering material as well as psychological and emotional support to the children. In addition, it contributes a substantial sum towards the operational expenses of the centre on a yearly basis.
- Visits to Institutions – groups of the CRCYS volunteers adopt one or more humanitarian institutions which they visit regularly offering recreation and presents to the inmates.
- Help to Needy Families – members visit needy families and talk with them about their problems and possible solutions and provide them with food, clothing and toys for the children
- Enclaved Children – Every Christmas and Easter the Youth Section sends presents to the enclaved Greek Cypriot children that live in the north of Cyprus.
- Emergency Relief – The CRCYS participates in the general Cyprus Red Cross Disaster Relief Scheme and is always ready to help and relieve sufferers of natural disasters. The Youth Section also participated most actively and effectively in the relief of the victims of the Turkish invasion of Cyprus.
- Help to other Countries - The section participates in provision of assistance to victims of armed conflicts and natural disasters in other countries by supplying items of immediate need and even sending representatives and aid to children in stricken areas as it did in Romania in March 1990.

Services to members of the CRCYS

- Seminars and lectures - Members take part in national and international seminars that promote information exchange, education and a spirit of solidarity among the young members of the Red Cross and Red Crescent Movement. The CRCYS also organizes lectures on the prevention/handling of serious problems that threaten society, especially the youth, such as drugs, AIDS, smoking, violence etc.
- Excursions, Recreation and Performances – The CRCYS organizes these activities to enable the members in becoming more acquainted with one another and to create a sense of friendship and cooperation.
- Camping – this national activity is organized every July at the Mitsis School at Lemithou and it's open to all youth members of the CRCYS. The camping event serves as both a pleasant holiday to members from needy families and a meeting platform of all the Cyprus Red Cross youth members.

Protection of the Environment

- Tree Planting- this event is organized together with the Cyprus Forest Department where the members get to actively join the reforestation of the island by planting their own trees.
- Cleaning Campaign- the CRCYS undertakes the cleaning of parks, beaches and other public spaces.

Fundraising

- Door to Door collection – The Youth participate most actively in this yearly, national Cyprus Red Cross event that takes place around 8 May (World Red Cross Day)
- Christmas Bazaar – this major event takes place around the Christmas holiday every year at certain public locations where everybody can buy various sweets prepared by the CRCYS, Christmas decorations and presents. In addition, people can join games and listen to Christmas carols performed by the Youth Section choirs.
- Christmas Carols - Youth Section choirs sing Christmas carols at institutions, companies, shopping malls and neighborhoods thus creating a festive atmosphere but also collecting money for further activities.

== See also ==
- List of Red Cross and Red Crescent Societies
- North Cyprus Red Crescent Society
