= First Lady of Cyprus =

Spouse of the President of Cyprus

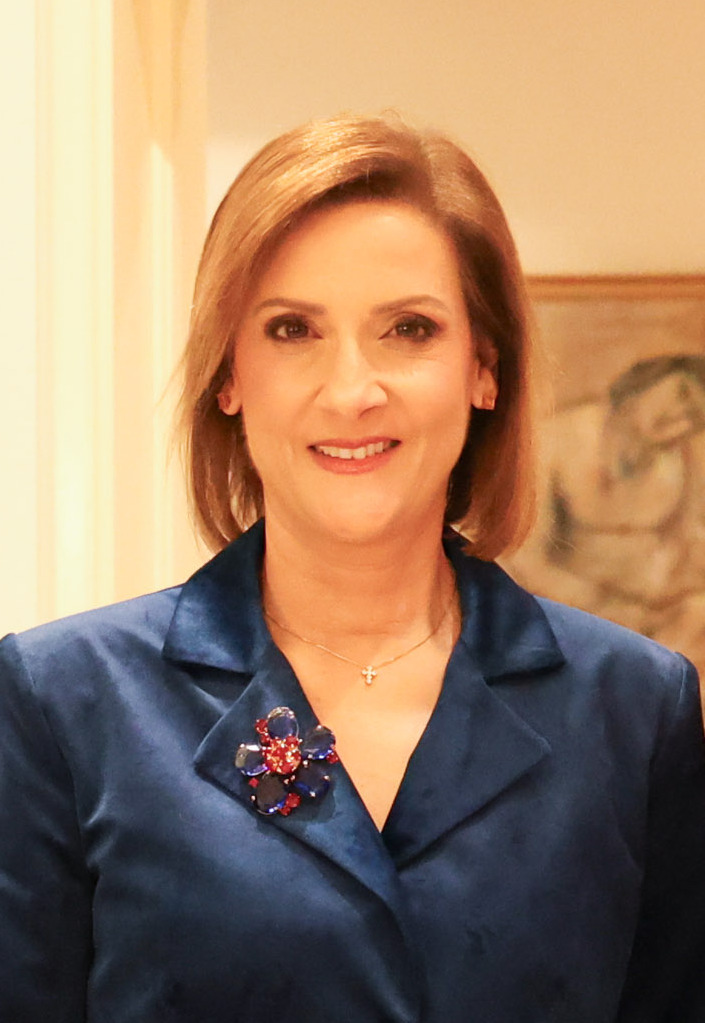
- Incumbent; Philippa Karsera since February 23, 2023
- Residence: Presidential Palace
- Website: First Lady of Cyprus

First Lady of Cyprus refers to the wife of the president of Cyprus. The country's current first lady is Philippa Karsera, a career diplomat and wife of President Nikos Christodoulides, who has held the position since 2023.

== First ladies of Cyprus ==
Name	Photograph	Term Began	Term Ended	President of Cyprus	Notes
Position vacant		August 16, 1960	July 15, 1974	Archbishop Makarios III	Makarios III, a clergyman and politician, was unmarried.
Vera Sampson (de facto)		July 15, 1974	July 23, 1974	Nikos Sampson (de facto)	Sampson was installed following the 1974 Cypriot coup d'état against Makarios
Lila Irene Clerides (acting)		July 23, 1974	December 7, 1974	Glafcos Clerides	
Position vacant		December 7, 1974	August 3, 1977	Archbishop Makarios III	Makarios III was unmarried.
Mimi Kyprianou		August 3, 1977	February 28, 1988	Spyros Kyprianou	
Androulla Vassiliou		February 28, 1988	February 28, 1993	George Vassiliou	Vassiliou later served as the European Commissioner for Health and Food Safety (2008–2010) and European Commissioner for Education, Culture, Multilingualism and Youth (2010–2014).
Lila Irene Clerides		February 28, 1993	February 28, 2003	Glafcos Clerides	Clerides was born Lila Erulkar in India.
Fotini Papadopoulos		February 28, 2003	February 28, 2008	Tassos Papadopoulos	
Elsie Chiratou		February 28, 2008	February 28, 2013	Demetris Christofias	
Andri Moustakoudes		February 28, 2013	February 23, 2023	Nicos Anastasiades	
Philippa Karsera		February 23, 2023	Present	Nikos Christodoulides	Karsera is a career Cypriot diplomat.
