= Presidential Cottage (Troodos) =

Government summer residence in Troodos, Cyprus

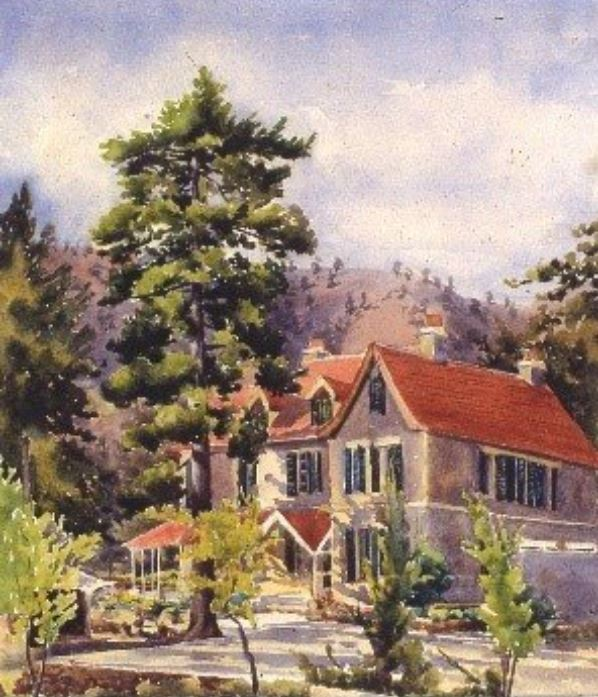
The presidential cottage in Troodos by Ann Villiers

The Presidential Cottage in Troodos, Cyprus, also known as the Government Cottage or Government Summer Residence, is the official summer retreat of the President of Cyprus. Located high at 1729 metres above sea level in the Troodos Mountains, the residence was built during British colonial rule in the late 19th century as the seasonal home of the Governor of Cyprus. Since independence in 1960 it has been used by the President of Cyprus as a working and leisure retreat.

== History ==
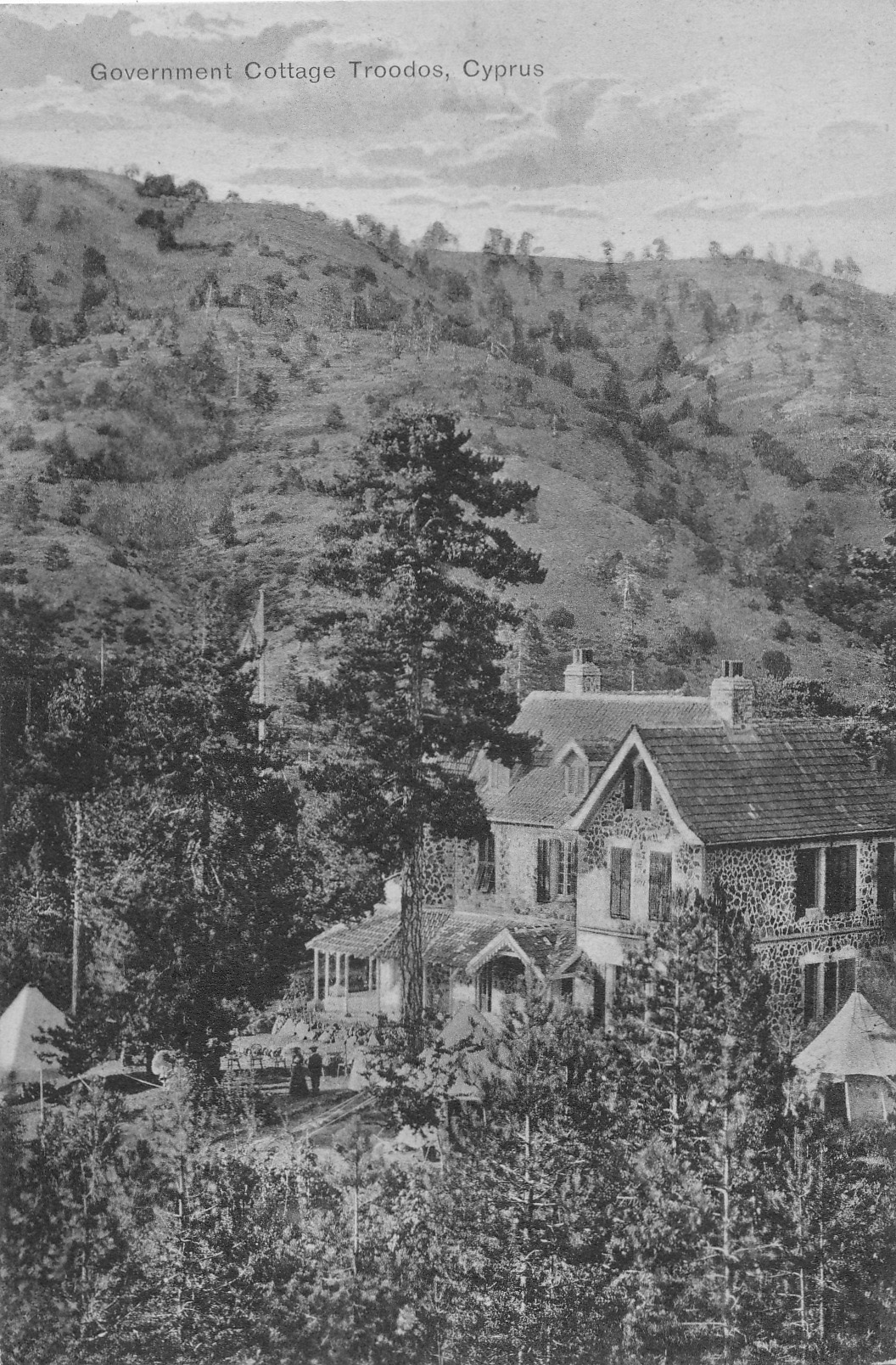
The presidential cottage from a distance (1924)

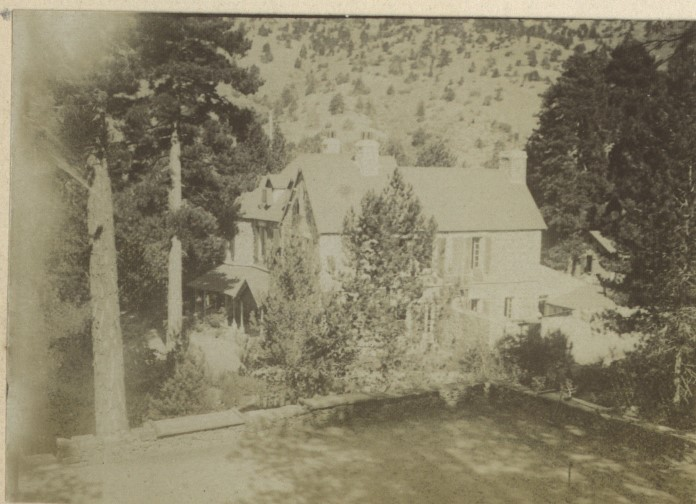
The presidential cottage in Troodos

The decision to establish a summer residence in the mountains was taken soon after the beginning of British rule on the island in 1878. The initiative is generally associated with general Robert Biddulph, the second High Commissioner of Cyprus under British administration, who sought to provide a healthier and cooler environment for government work during the intense summer heat of Nicosia. The colonial administration considered the capital’s climate to be unhealthy, and therefore looked for a mountain refuge where official business could continue without interruption.

Construction of the cottage began in 1879–1880 under the direction of Lieutenant George Wisely of the Royal Engineers. The building became the nucleus of what was effectively a colonial hill station, where senior officials and their families spent the summer season. This practice echoed similar arrangements in India, such as the use of Shimla as the summer capital of British India.

Over the years the residence developed into a centre of social as well as political life in the Troodos. It hosted receptions, banquets and official visits, and became closely associated with the seasonal rhythm of government. After independence in 1960, the property passed to the Republic of Cyprus and was designated the official Presidential Summer Residence.

The complex has been repeatedly modernised and expanded. Major works were carried out in 1932–1933, adding new service buildings and improving sanitary facilities. Further refurbishment occurred at the end of the 20th century, particularly during the presidency of Glafcos Clerides (1999–2001), when heating and modern utilities were installed.

== Architecture ==
The Presidential Cottage is a three-storey stone structure built with local blue limestone, while the roof was covered with imported French tiles rather than the more common Cypriot red tiles. The main residence contains approximately 21 rooms, arranged around central staircases and corridors designed for both domestic use and official receptions.

The estate was originally equipped with extensive auxiliary facilities. These included stables for up to twelve horses, servants’ quarters, storage buildings, and landscaped gardens. Recreational spaces were also introduced, notably tennis and croquet courts, reflecting the lifestyle of the colonial elite. An aqueduct channelled spring water to the residence, a rare feature in the Troodos at the time.

Later improvements added further accommodation, heating systems, and communication facilities. The overall architectural character remains restrained, reflecting British colonial pragmatism combined with adaptations to local building materials and climate.

== Use in the Republic of Cyprus ==
Today the cottage remains an active part of the Cypriot presidency. It is used during the summer months as both a retreat and a working residence, hosting cabinet meetings, diplomatic receptions and occasional international visitors. Public access is restricted, though the building and its grounds are a familiar landmark for those living in or visiting the Troodos region.

== Cultural references ==
A persistent local legend links the French poet Arthur Rimbaud to the site, claiming that he supervised part of the construction in 1880 while working briefly in Cyprus. Although there is evidence that Rimbaud was employed on the island at that time, scholars consider the direct association with the Troodos residence to be unproven.

== See also ==
- Presidential Palace, Nicosia
