= Constantine Leventis =

Greek Cypriot businessman and philanthropist (1938–2002)

- Born: 19 April 1938; Larnaca, Cyprus
- Died: 11 July 2002 (aged 64); London, England
- Education: Harrow School
- Alma mater: Cambridge University
- Occupations: Businessman, philanthropist
- Spouse: Edmée Vassiliades
- Children: 3

Constantine "Dino" Leventis (19 April 1938 – 11 July 2002) was a Greek Cypriot businessman, art benefactor and cultural philanthropist.

== Early life ==
Leventis was born near Larnaca, Cyprus. He was educated in England at Harrow School and at Clare College, Cambridge, where he studied classics. Leventis began his career in Ghana and Nigeria working for the family's trading group, which operated retail, import and export businesses. In Nigeria, he became chief executive of Leventis Motors, the country's largest vehicle importer, and negotiated assembly agreements for Mercedes-Benz trucks.

== Business career ==
After returning to London in the late 1970s, Leventis expanded the family's soft drinks operations in Europe. He oversaw the growth of the Hellenic Bottling Company and its merger with Coca-Cola Beverages to form Coca-Cola Hellenic Bottling Company, becoming the second-largest Coca-Cola bottler worldwide. His business activities also extended to manufacturing, real estate and shipping.

== Philanthropy ==
As chair of the A. G. Leventis Foundation, Leventis supported the study and preservation of ancient Greek and Cypriot art. The foundation funded museum galleries devoted to Cypriot and Hellenic antiquities in major institutions including the British Museum, the Fitzwilliam Museum, the Louvre and the Metropolitan Museum of Art. He also promoted archaeological projects, including the restoration of sites in Greece and Cyprus. Following the 1974 Turkish invasion of Cyprus, Leventis supported efforts to recover looted artefacts and acknowledge shared heritage with Turkish Cypriots. In 1979, he became Cyprus's honorary ambassador to UNESCO.

He was Treasurer of Europa Nostra and he received posthumously a Europa Nostra Medal of Honour in 2003 at the Europa Nostra’s 40th anniversary Conference held at the Palais de l'Europe in Strasbourg.

== Later life and death ==
Leventis settled with his family in England by 1978 and contributed to cultural and educational initiatives for the Greek and Cypriot diaspora, including co-founding London's Hellenic Centre in 1993. He received honours from several countries and was an honorary fellow of Royal Holloway College and the University of North London. He died of cancer in London on 11 July 2002 at the age of 64.
