= Fotini Papadopoulos =

First Lady of Cyprus from 2003 to 2008

- Φωτεινή Παπαδόπουλος
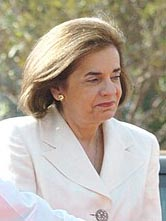
- Papadopoulos in 2006

First Lady of Cyprus
- In office 28 February 2003 – 28 February 2008
- President: Tassos Papadopoulos
- Preceded by: Lila Irene Clerides
- Succeeded by: Elsie Chiratou

Personal details
- Born: 6 March 1950 (age 76) Paris, France
- Spouse(s): Polycarpos Giorkatzis (m. 1967; died 1970) Tassos Papadopoulos (m. 1972; died 2008)
- Children: 4, including Constantinos and Nikolas
- Parent: Anastasios George Leventis (father)

Fotini Papadopoulos (née Leventis, Greek: Φωτεινή Παπαδόπουλος; born 6 March 1950) is a Cypriot philanthropist. She is the widow of president of Cyprus Tassos Papadopoulos, and as such is a former First Lady of Cyprus.

== Life ==
Papadopoulos was born on 6 March 1950 in Paris, France, as the daughter of renowned businessman and philanthropist Anastasios George Leventis. She studied and grew up in Paris.

In 1967, she married politician Polycarpos Giorkatzis, with whom she had two children, Constantinos and Maria. Giorkatzis was murdered in March 1970 and Fotini identified the murderer, although the murder was never solved.

She married Tassos Papadopoulos in 1972, with whom she had two children, Nikolas and Anastasia.

Papadopoulos has been a member of the Cyprus Red Cross since 1973, of which she is also president since 2004, and she created its youth department shortly before the Turkish invasion of 1974. She created several programmes that helped to promote volunteering in schools.

She became First Lady of Cyprus on 28 February 2003 after her husband Tassos was sworn in President of Cyprus. That year Fotini was named "Woman of Europe" by the Cyprus Council of the International Association for the Promotion of Women of Europe. During her tenure, Fotini organised social and charitable events at the Presidential Palace.

Tassos died on 12 December 2008 from cancer. After Tassos' corpse was stolen in December 2009, Fotini confirmed on 9 March 2010 the discovery of his body after DNA testing confirmed it.

== Honors ==
- Honorary Member of the Xirka Ġieħ ir-Repubblika (Malta, 2005).
- Commander of the Order of the Phoenix (Greece, 2014).
- Legion of Honor (France, 2023)
