= Elsie Chiratou =

First Lady of Cyprus from 2008 to 2013

- Έλση Χηράτου
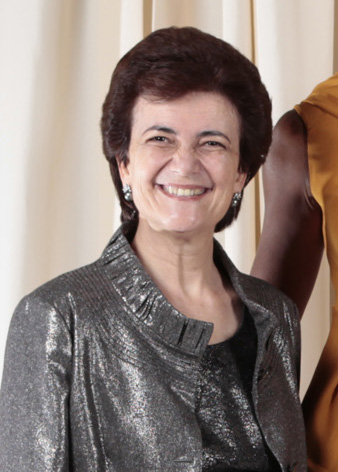
- Chiratou in 2009

First Lady of Cyprus
- In office 28 February 2008 – 28 February 2013
- President: Demetris Christofias
- Preceded by: Fotini Papadopoulos
- Succeeded by: Andri Moustakoudes

Personal details
- Born: 7 October 1952 (age 73) Pelendri, British Cyprus
- Party: AKEL
- Spouse: Demetris Christofias (m. 1972; died 2019)
- Children: 3, including Christos Christofias
- Education: Institute of Social Sciences of Moscow

Elsie Chiratou (Greek: Έλση Χηράτου; born 7 October 1952) is a Cypriot politician. She is the widow of president of Cyprus Demetris Christofias, and as such is a former First Lady of Cyprus.

== Life ==
Chiratou was born on 7 October 1952, in Pelendri, British Cyprus, although in 1955 her family moved to Limassol, where she grew up. In the early 1970s, she moved to Moscow to study at the Institute of Social Sciences.

During the Turkish invasion of Cyprus, she and her husband Dimitris Christofias traveled from Dikomo to Nicosia to resist the coup. Between 1975 and 1977 she worked for the Pan-Cyprian Federation of Women's Organizations (POGO) from 1975 to 1977 and from 1977 to 2013, she worked for the AKEL Nicosia-Kyrenia District Committee.

She became First Lady of Cyprus on 28 February 2008 when her husband Christofias was sworn in President of Cyprus. She was the first left-wing First Lady, and during her tenure she remained close to vulnerable communities, working to ensure that people with disabilities could access the Presidential Palace, and has served as honorary president of various institutions and charitable organizations in the country, such as the Bank of Cyprus Oncology Centre.

Christofias died on 21 June 2019 from a long illness.

== Personal life ==
In Moscow, Chiratou met Dimitris Christofias, whom she married on 20 August 1972 in Dikomo and with whom she had three children, including the politician Christos Christofias.
