= Hellenic Centre =

British charitable organization

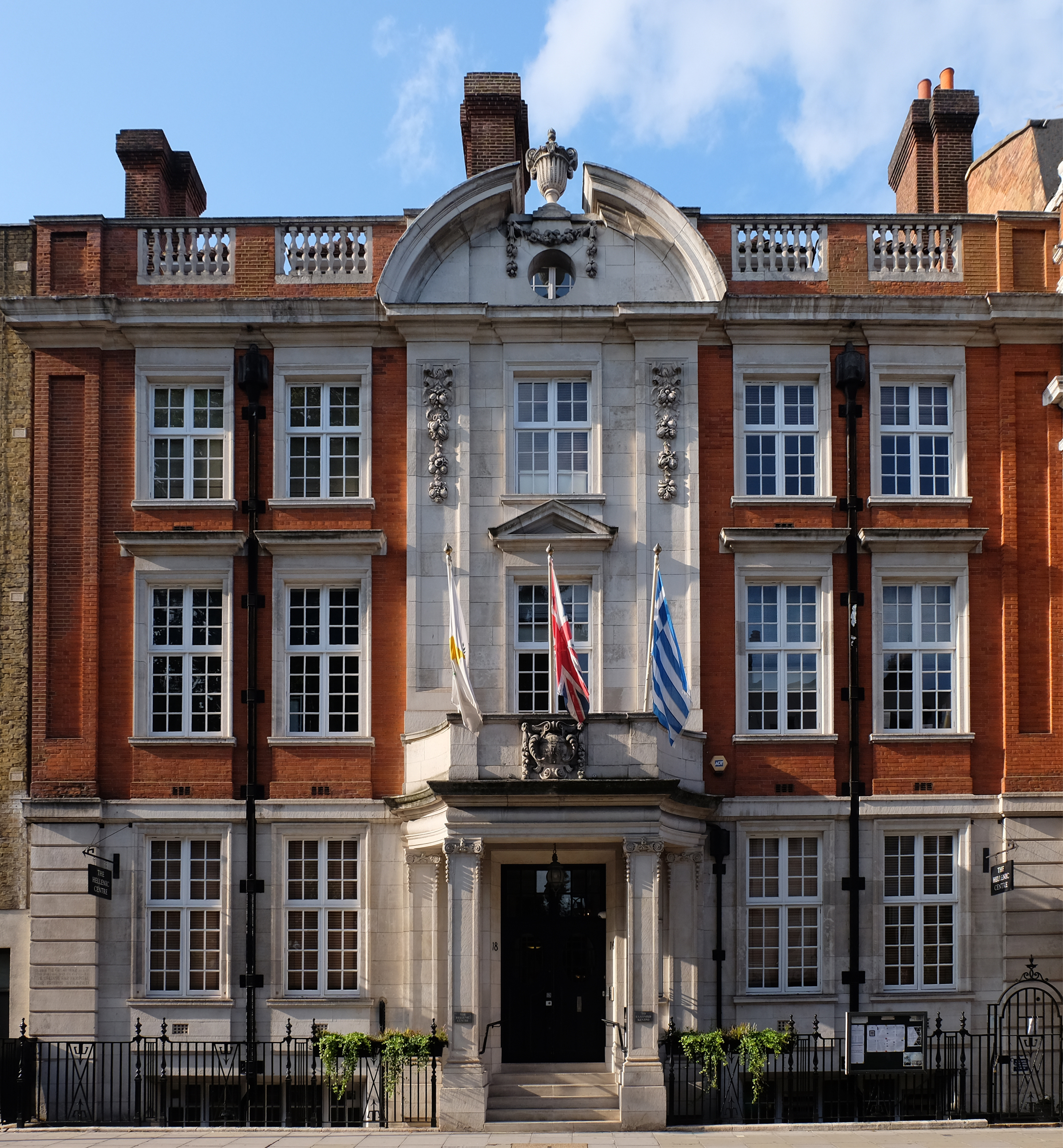
The Hellenic Centre, 16-18 Paddington Street, W1U 5AS

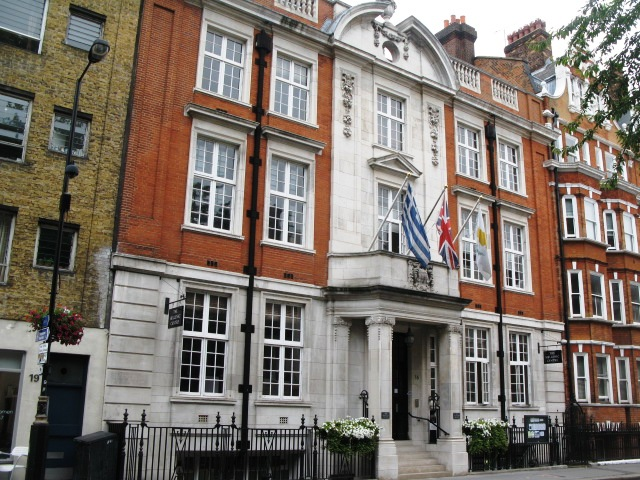
The Hellenic Centre

The Hellenic Centre is a British organisation focused on Greek culture and language. Based in London, it was established to "promote awareness of Hellenic culture and nurture UK relations with the Hellenic world". Operating from premises at 16-18 Paddington Street, the centre is run by the Hellenic Community Trust, a company limited by guarantee, and registered as a charity in 1994.

== History ==
Following previous unsuccessful attempts to establish such a centre, the acquisition of a building in 1992 was a key step. The Hellenic Centre is located in an early 20th century Portland stone and red brick building close to Marylebone High Street in central London. This was purchased for £1.25 million in 1992, with the help of donations and support from individuals and organisations including the A G Leventis Foundation, Fafalios Shipping SA, the Bank of Cyprus London Ltd, the Michael Marks Foundation, and the governments of Greece and Cyprus.

The Hellenic Community Trust was established as a charitable body to take ownership of the building. An appeal was then launched to raise further money needed for renovations and refurbishment required to provide meeting and exhibition rooms, including the Great Hall. The centre was blessed by the ecumenical patriarch Bartholomew I in 1993, and officially inaugurated on November 18, 1994, by the president of the Republic of Cyprus Glafcos Clerides.

The centre is run by the trustees and an executive board (all volunteers); a full-time director manages the centre on a day-to-day basis, with the necessary administrative support.

=== Building history ===
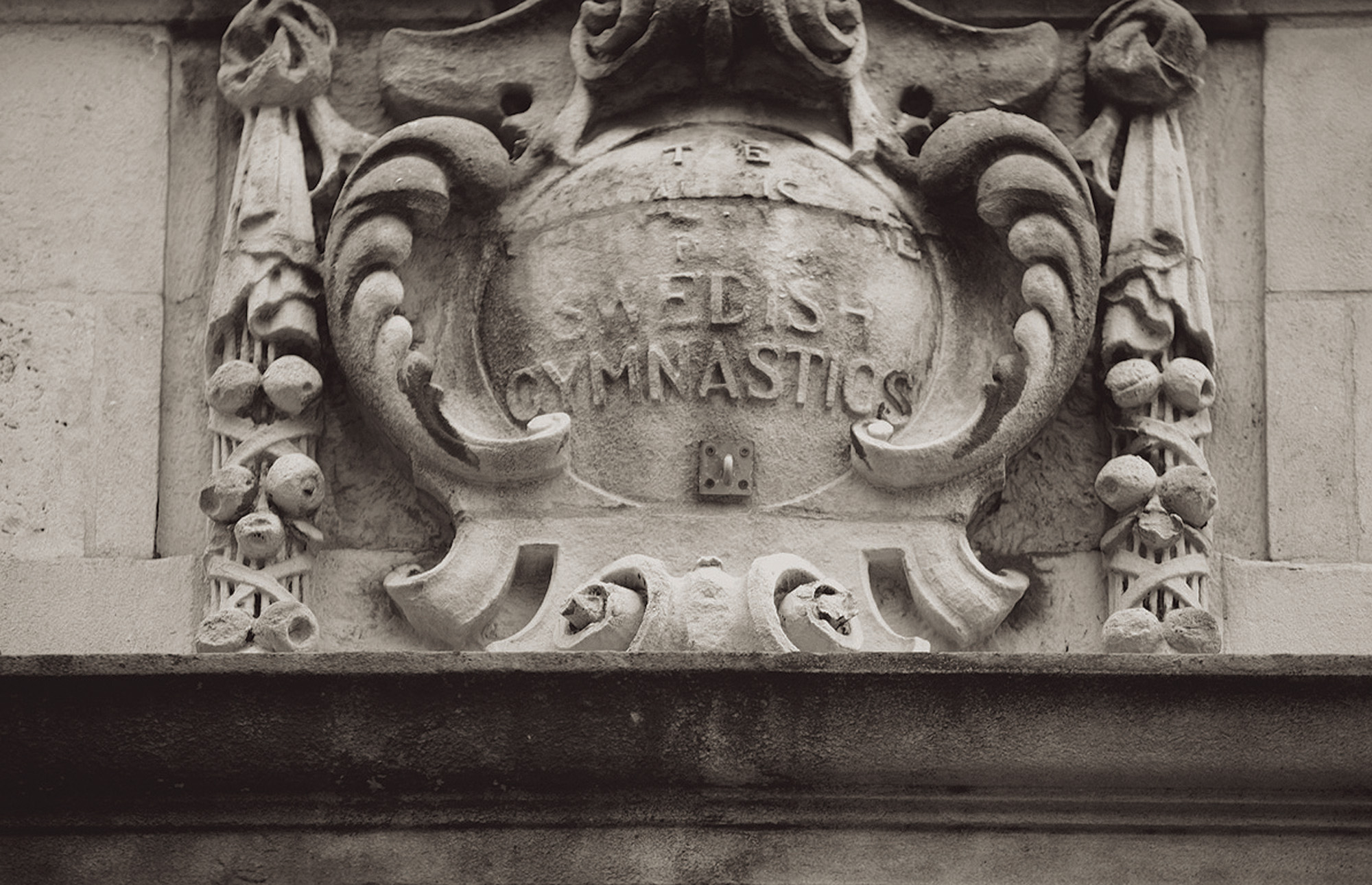
Stone cartouche above the front porch of the Hellenic Centre, with the words “Central Institute for Swedish Gymnastics” bracketed between a pair of carved curling leaves

The building was originally commissioned by Allan Broman (1861-1947) in 1910 from architects Forsyth and Maule. Broman was a pioneer of Swedish medical gymnastics and massage—a form of what is now known as physiotherapy. Devised by Per Henrik Ling in Stockholm in the early 19th century, the approach aimed to improve physical fitness and aid recovery after illness. Lecture halls and classrooms were created for training teachers.

Following the outbreak of World War I in 1914, the building became the Swedish War Hospital for British Wounded, treating patients with shell shock, gas poisoning, trench fever and wounds from shell splinters, shrapnel and machine-gun fire. Pioneering operations to join severed nerve ends were performed in the hospital's operating theatres, whose equipment included X-ray machines.

After the war, the building was purchased by London County Council as a teacher training college for physical education. The building later passed to the Inner London Education Authority, but closed in 1990 after ILEA's abolition.

After a conversion preserving many of its original features (including some of the gymnastic equipment, transformed into modern sculptures by the artist George Kyriakou), the building was reopened as the Hellenic Centre in 1994.

== Awards and recognition ==
- Athens Academy Award - 24 March 2011
