= Katherine Clerides =

Cypriot politician (1949–2025)

Kaiti Clerides (Greek: Καίτη Κληρίδου; 10 May 1949 – 6 October 2025), was a Cypriot activist who advocated for the peaceful reunification of Cyprus. She was Honorary President of the Board of the Glafcos Clerides Institute in Cyprus and a former MP in the House of Representatives, Cyprus. She was the first woman to be elected as vice-president of the Democratic Rally party (2003–2007) and the first Secretary of the Women's Organization of her party. She was a member of the Cyprus Conflict Resolution Trainers Group which is thought to have helped to start the peace movement in Cyprus. She was known for her decades of work on the rights of women and girls in Cyprus and for her inter-community and reconciliation work on the divided island. She was a barrister-at-law and a citizen peace-builder. In 2016 she became a JAMS Weinstein Senior Fellow in recognition of her contribution to the field of Alternative Dispute Resolution (ADR), having participated in conflict resolution workshops, organized by the Fulbright Commission, for Greek and Turkish Cypriots working for the reconciliation and reunification of the island. She was married to Costas Shammas, an accountant and peace activist.

== Early life and education ==
Katherine Clerides was born in London, England on 10 May 1949, the daughter of Glafcos Clerides (1919–2013), who was President of the Republic of Cyprus from 1993 to 2003, and Lilla Erulkar (1921–2007). She was the granddaughter of Ioannis Clerides, former mayor of Nicosia. Clerides had qualifications in sociology (Bedford College, University of London), political science (New York University), and law (Gray's Inn, London).

== Political and community career ==
Clerides worked at the Department of Statistics and Research of the Republic of Cyprus from 1970 to 1971 and at the Centre for Social Research from 1972 to 1974. From 1975 to 1977 she worked at the International Federation of Family Planning in London. From 1980 to 1991 she was a legal advisor to the Bank of Cyprus. In 1974 she took on the duties of press representative at the Cyprus Press and Information Office, informing foreign journalists about the Cyprus issue and the problems of refugees.

She was an MP for the Nicosia district of Cyprus for two terms between 1991 and 2003, and was also a substitute candidate from 2004 to 2006. She founded and was the head of the Secretariat of Community Outreach and Civil Society Empowerment of the Democratic Rally party (DISY) of Cyprus. She was a founding member and the secretary of the women's organization of the DISY and became president of the Social Policy and Women's Rights Committee of the party. She has also been the vice president of the DISY. She established the DISY Bi-Communal Relations Bureau in 1999.

Clerides was Honorary President of the Board of the Glafcos Clerides Institute in Cyprus. The institute is a member of the Wilfried Martens Centre for European Studies, the political think tank of the European Peoples’ Party. During her time as an MP, Clerides worked on legislation that was designed to improve the position of women, such as the prevention of violence in the home and sexual harassment at work, the division of property on divorce, pensions and the promotion of LGBTQ+ rights.

She was a founding member and co-chair of the International Ecological Peace Village for the Promotion of Sustainable Development and Conflict Resolution and a founding member of the Association for the Protection of Persons with Intellectual Disabilities, of the Initiative Group on Addressing Sexual Harassment in the Workplace and the Initiative Group on Traffic Safety.

Clerides served as Commissioner for Humanitarian Affairs of the Cyprus Government from 2013 to 2015 with responsibility for the religious minorities of Maronites, Armenians and Latins, Cypriots of the diaspora, and matters relating to missing and enslaved persons.

== Bi-communal work ==
Clerides worked continuously for contact and reconciliation between Greek and Turkish Cypriots. On 8 March 2000 she gave a talk at the 'Cyprus Uncovered' conference on the prospects for peace in Cyprus at Cambridge University. In May 2005 she gave a talk at the ‘Roads to Stable Peace in Cyprus’ conference with Serdar Denktas, the son of former Turkish Republic of Cyprus President, Rauf Dentas. She was involved in the Europe-Cyprus: The Cyprus oral history and living memory project. She attended the 'Empower, Motivate, Connect' AIPFE-Women of Europe presentation of the organization's vision in 2015. The next year, 2016, she was a visiting scholar in the Negotiation, Conflict Resolution and Peacebuilding (NCRP) programme in California State Hills University. She disagreed with the ruling party and defended the Turkish Cypriot candidate Niyazi Kizilyurek in elections. She can be seen giving an interview under the auspices of the Martens Centre by video interview with Florian Hartleib. Another video was made in March, 2022 with CVAR (The Centre for Visual Arts and Research) at the Bicommunal Museum, entitled "Thoughts over a cup of Coffee." She donated three thousand books from the special collection of her father, former President Glafcos Clerides, to CVAR. In May 2022 she attended the Cyprus Peace and Dialogue Association and International Communities Organization 'Party in the Park, bringing Cypriot Communities Together'. She supported Mary Pyrgos at her 'Cyprus Stories' stall situated at the United Nations Peacekeeping Force in Cyprus, Business and Networking Fair held inside the UN buffer zone in Nicosia in summer, 2022.

== Death ==
Clerides died of cancer on 6 October 2025, at the age of 76.

== Awards ==
In 1994 Clerides became an Eisenhower Exchange Fellow focusing on women's issues, federalism and environmentally friendly development.

She became a JAMS Weinstein Senior Fellow in 2016 in recognition of her contribution to the field of Alternative Dispute Resolution (ADR), having participated in conflict resolution workshops, organized by the Fulbright Commission, for Greek and Turkish Cypriots working for the reconciliation and reunification of the island.

== Selected publications ==
- Building Bridges in a Polarized World and Divided Cyprus 2022 Heterotopia
- Overcoming Ethnic Divides: Is Cyprus Ready For Success with Y. Harris 2016
- 'Building bridges on a divided island: The Case of Cyprus' pp 38–41 in The Heybeliada Talks: Two years of Public Diplomacy on Cyprus Eds. S. Tiryaki and M. Akgun 2011
