= North Cyprus Red Crescent Society =

Emblem

The KKTC Kızılayı (Turkish: North Cyprus Red Crescent Society) is the Red Crescent society in the Turkish Republic of Northern Cyprus. It is an observer member of the International Red Cross and Red Crescent Movement.

== Foundation ==
North Cyprus Red Crescent Society was formed by the core group of people who has worked voluntarily since 1963. Its headquarters are in Lefkoşa, and it has seven branches in Turkish Republic of Northern Cyprus.

== Organisation ==
North Cyprus Turkish Red Crescent Society has all representative and competent organs composed of the elected members. These organs are described in the 3rd Section of it Statute. The elections are held on a regular basis as prescribed in its statute. The branches are the following:

1. Lefkoşa,
2. Girne,
3. Magusa,
4. Esentepe,
5. Güzelyurt,
6. Dipkarpaz,
7. İskele.

== Legal basis ==
The Turkish Federated State of Cyprus recognised Northern Cyprus Turkish Red Crescent on 12 November 1974 with the Decision of Council of Ministers No. 5251. The first by law of the Northern Cyprus Turkish Red Crescent was adopted in 1974, and revised in 2005 and 2008. Turkish Cypriot Provisional Administration established on 28 December 1967 included arrangements, which protected the names and emblems of Red Crescent and Red Cross Societies, in Military Crime and Procedural Law 16 on 13 April 1973. The Turkish Federated State of Cyprus, which was established later, brought in the same arrangements with the Law on Military Crimes and Sentences 17 adopted on 19 April 1983.

In 2013, the North Cyprus Red Crescent Society became an observer member of the International Federation of Red Cross and Red Crescent Societies.

On 9 May 2013, the North Cyprus Red Crescent Society applied for "full" membership to the ICRC, IFRC and Standing Commission.

== Mission ==
As in the mission description, the North Cyprus Turkish Red Crescent Society has voluntarily worked to build up its capacity to serve the victims of natural and man-made disasters. This has been done through different programmes at organisational and communal levels. It has worked with different stakeholders including official authorities as the necessity of its auxiliary role.

== Activities ==
The government of Northern Cyprus granted (via the North Cyprus Red Crescent Society) tents, blankets, food, construction materials (cement, covering slate, timber and bricks), power generators, wood stoves, and warm clothes in the Kyrgyzstan earthquake in 2008.

== See also ==
- Cyprus Red Cross
- List of Red Cross and Red Crescent Societies
- Membership of Northern Cyprus in international organizations
