= Dimitris Lipertis =

Cypriot poet (1866–1937)

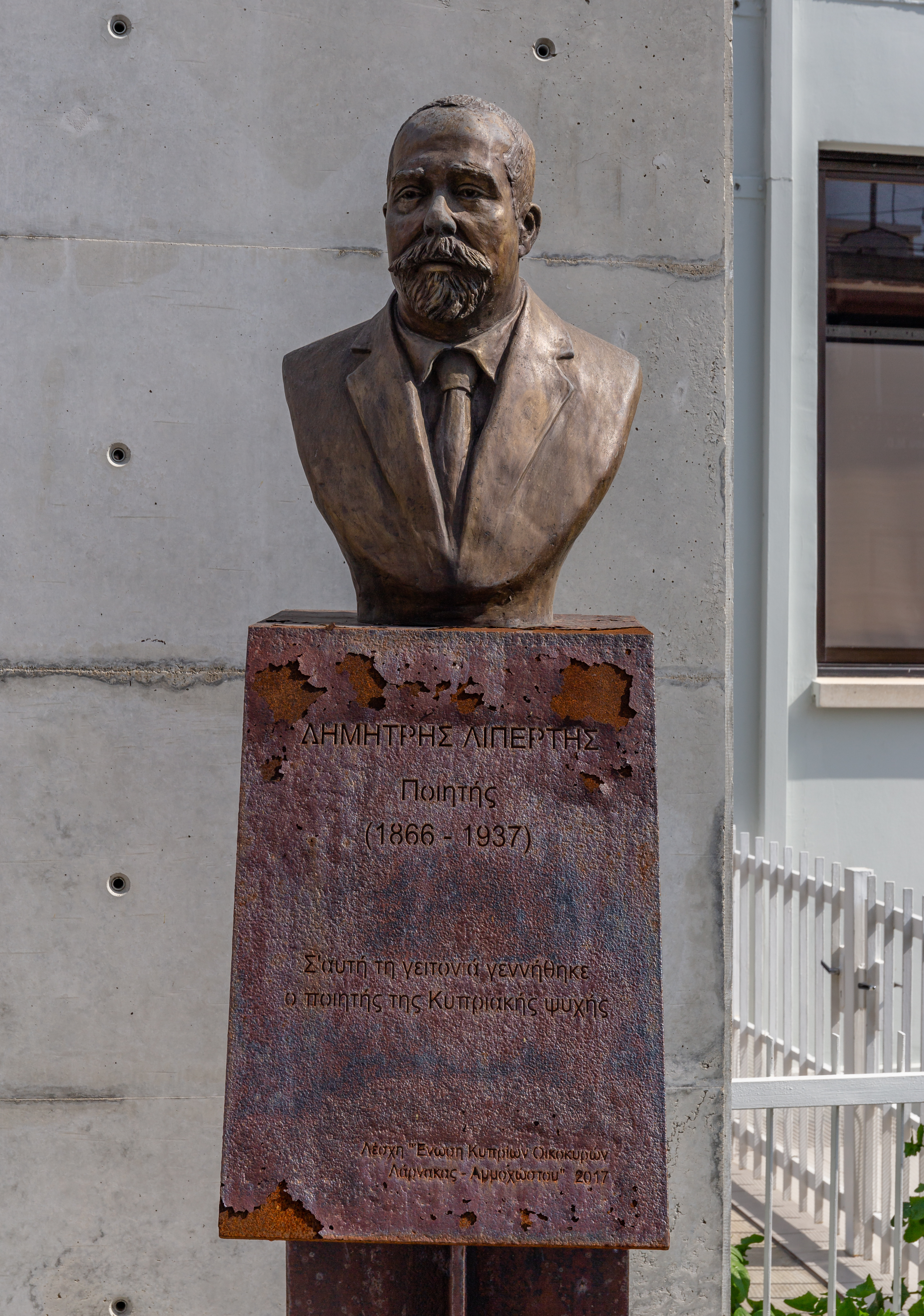
- Memorial of Dimitris Lipertis in Larnaca
- Born: Δημήτρης Λιπέρτης; 1866; Larnaca, Cyprus
- Died: 1937 (aged 70–71); Nicosia, Cyprus
- Occupation: Poet
- Writing career
- Period: 1890–1937

Dimitris Theophani Lipertis (Greek: Δημήτρης Λιπέρτης; 1866–1937) was a Greek Cypriot poet.

== Biography ==
Lipertis was born in Larnaca in 1866 (exact date disputed–either 22 September or 26 October). His father, Theofanis Lipertis hailed from Kyrenia, but moved to Larnaca where he set up a trading company. His mother was Kokonou Modinos.

He obtained his basic education from various literary figures of Larnaca. He then furthered his studies in Beirut (from 1880 to 1884) where he studied languages at the American University of Beirut and the Jesuit Université Saint-Joseph specializing in English and French. On his return to Cyprus, he first took up a clerical post (1885–1890) at Larnaca legal courts. For the next decade he worked in various governmental departments such as payroll officer in the public works department, inspector of vineyard diseases, coastguard official etc. Through his various jobs he came into contact with the Cypriot countryside and its genuine inhabitants, along with getting to know the various dialects spoken in the different regions of Cyprus.

In 1900 he left Cyprus for Naples where he studied philosophy and then to Athens for theology studies. He also traveled to Egypt in search of employment. On his return he began working as a teacher in the capital Nicosia. He first worked at the Pancyprian Gymnasium from 1910 to 1912 as a French language teacher and then at The English School. He also served as the first headmaster of the Mitsis Commercial Academy at Lemithou.

Lipertis died in Nicosia in 1937.

In 1978, his portrait was depicted on one of two stamps in a commemorative issue themed on Cypriot poets. The other stamp depicted Vasilis Michaelides.

Outside the theater of the Municipality of Strovolos, his bust is decorating the entrance on the left while the bust of Vasilis Michaelides stands on the right side.

== Works ==
He wrote and published some poetry in katharevousa but the main body of his work is in the Cypriot Dialect. Some of his poems have been set to music by Cypriot composer Achilleas Lymbouridis and Greek composer Dimitris Layios. He is considered as one of the most prominent modern Cypriot poets and has been the theme of stamps issued by the Cyprus Post Office.

He published 3 collections of poems:

- 1891 - The relaxed harp (Halaromeni Lira - Χαλαρωμένη Λύρα)
- 1898 - Stoni (Στόνοι)
- 1923 - The Cypriot Songs (Tzipriotika Tragoudia - Τζ'υπριώτικα Τραούδκια)

In addition his private letters to various people were characterized by a vivid and intelligent content with clever humor and literary merit.
