= 2003 Cypriot presidential election =

- 16 February 2003
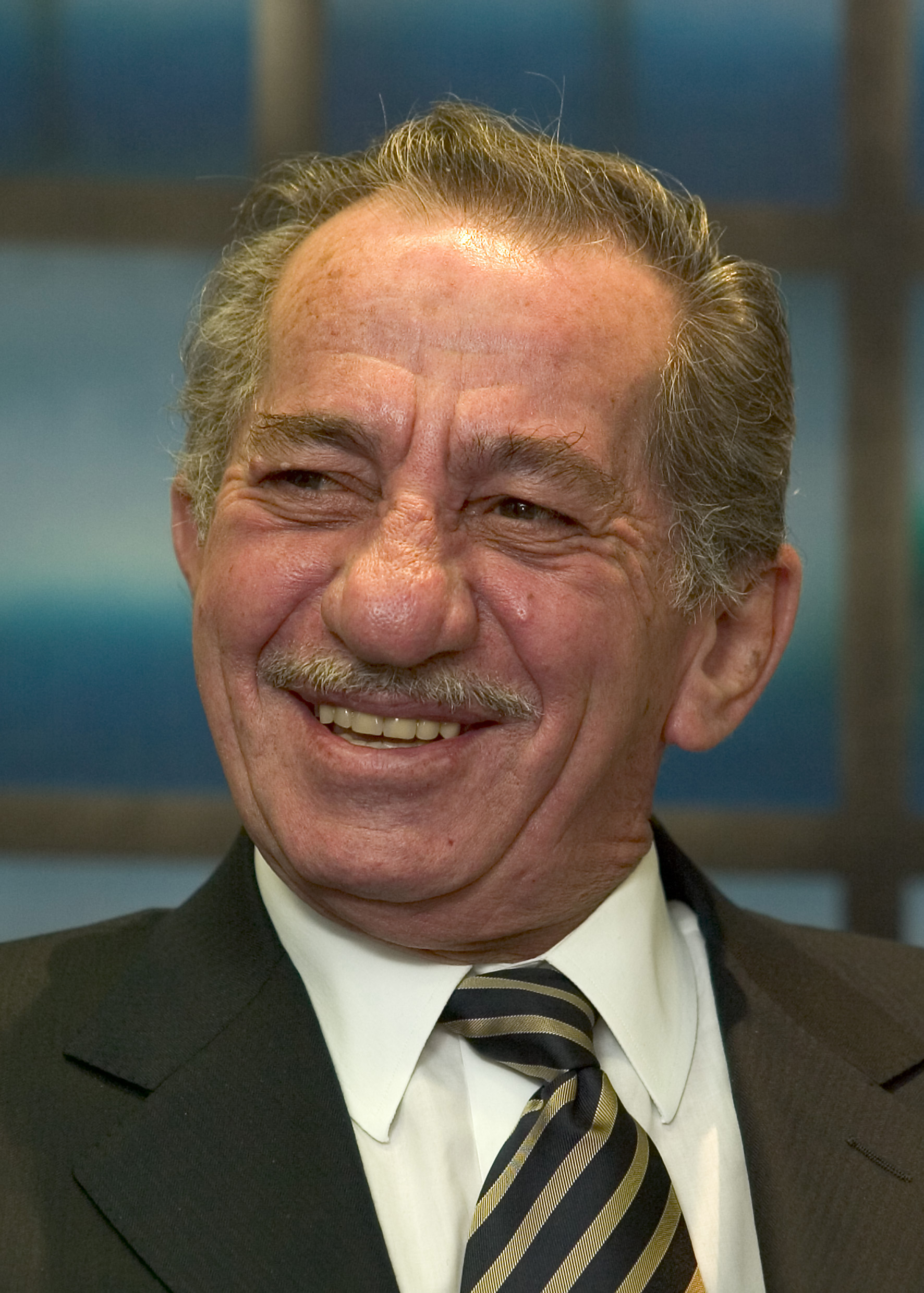

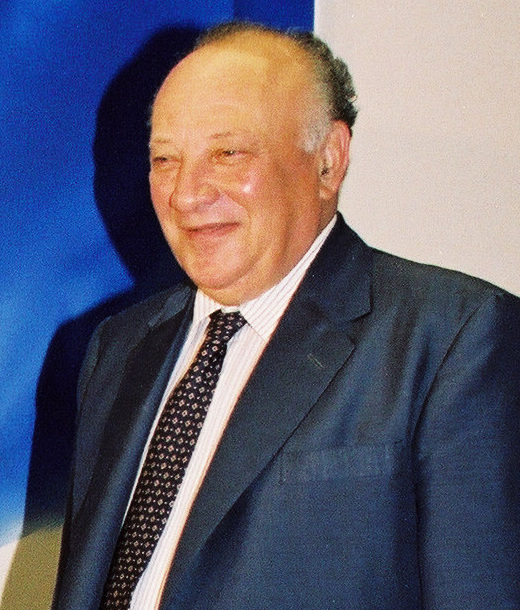

Candidate	Tassos Papadopoulos	Glafcos Clerides	Alecos Markides
Party	DIKO	DISY	Independent
Popular vote	213,353	160,724	27,404
Percentage	51.51%	38.80%	6.62%
- Results by district
President before election
Glafcos Clerides
DISY
Elected President
Tassos Papadopoulos
DIKO

Presidential elections were held in Cyprus on 16 February 2003. The election campaign was dominated by the ongoing negotiations over the Annan Plan for Cyprus. Incumbent President Glafcos Clerides was largely in favour of the plan, while leading opposition candidate Tassos Papadopoulos wanted substantial amendments before he would accept it. Papadopoulos in the first round with 52% of the vote. Voter turnout was 91%.

== Candidates ==
On 3 January 2003 the incumbent President Glafcos Clerides said that he would be standing for re-election in the upcoming presidential election, after previously saying he would not stand again. Clerides, from the Democratic Rally party, had been elected in 1993 and 1998 and called for Cypriots to elect him for a further limited 16 months as president to give him time to try to reach a deal with Turkish Northern Cyprus on reunifying the island. He wanted other candidates to unite behind him and agree to form a national unity government to try to reach a settlement; however, this was not agreed to by his opponents.

Clerides' main opponent was expected to be Tassos Papadopoulos, leader of the Democratic Party. Papadopoulos was seen as being more hardline in negotiations with the Turkish Cypriots and had previously accused Clerides of selling out the interests of Greek Cypriots in negotiations. Papadopoulos was backed by the biggest party in Cyprus, the communist Progressive Party of Working People and had been clear favourite in the election until Clerides announced he would stand again.

Clerides' campaign was hurt by the decision of his close aide and attorney general Alecos Markides to also stand in the election as an independent. Markides was standing as he believed Cyprus needed a younger, more modern, leader than the 83-year-old Clerides. His candidacy however was seen as likely to split the support of centre-right voters and thus assist Papadopoulos in the election.

A further seven candidates stood in the election including one, Costas Kyriacou, calling for free love.

== Campaign ==
Opinion polls during the campaign showed Papadopoulos with a significant lead over Clerides. The ongoing negotiations over the Annan Plan for Cyprus dominated the campaign with Clerides being seen as more favourable to the plan than many voters and this contributed to the more sceptical Papadopoulos pulling ahead. Papadopoulos called for the Annan plan to be amended and said that Clerides was giving away too much in negotiations. However Papadopoulos emphasized that he would negotiate for a deal if he was elected and ran television adverts which attempted to reduce voter concerns over his previous nationalist stance.

The election campaign was low key with Clerides refusing to campaign for the election. On the day before the election the final polls showed Papadopoulos with a 12% lead over Clerides, with a reasonable chance of winning over 50% of the vote and avoiding the need for a second round.

== Results ==
The results saw Papadopoulos winning over 51% of the vote compared to almost 39% for Clerides, meaning that he was elected in the first round. Markides trailed in third place with 6.6% of the vote, while Kyriakou won 0.44% but claimed that he really won 73%. Voting was compulsory and so voter turnout was high at over 90%.

The leader of Turkish North Cyprus Rauf Denktaş described the result as disappointing but Papadopoulos said he would begin talks on the United Nations plan within a few days of the election.

Candidate	Party	Votes	%
Tassos Papadopoulos	Democratic Party	213,353	51.51
Glafcos Clerides	Democratic Rally	160,724	38.80
Alecos Markides	Independent	27,404	6.62
Nicos Koutsou	New Horizons	8,771	2.12
Costas Kyriacou	Independent	1,840	0.44
Andreas Efstratiou	Independent	606	0.15
Adamos Katsantonis	Independent	558	0.13
Christos Iosifides	Independent	391	0.09
Georgios Mavrogenis	Independent	337	0.08
Pantelis Sofokleous	Independent	209	0.05
Total		414,193	100.00
Valid votes		414,193	95.95
Invalid/blank votes		17,497	4.05
Total votes		431,690	100.00
Registered voters/turnout		476,758	90.55
Source: MOI
