= Andri Moustakoudes =

First Lady of Cyprus from 2013 to 2023

- Άντρη Μουστακούδη
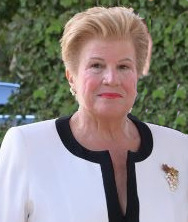
- Moustakoudes in 2022

First Lady of Cyprus
- In office 28 February 2013 – 28 February 2023
- President: Nicos Anastasiades
- Preceded by: Elsie Chiratou
- Succeeded by: Philippa Karsera

Personal details
- Born: 1948 (age 77–78) Limassol, British Cyprus
- Spouse: Nicos Anastasiades (m. 1971)
- Children: 2
- Occupation: Doxiadis School

Andri Moustakoudes (Greek: Άντρη Μουστακούδη; born September 1948) is a Cypriot civil engineer. She served as First Lady of Cyprus between 2013 and 2023 during the presidency of her husband, Nicos Anastasiades.

== Early life ==
Moustakoudes was born in September 1948 in Limassol, British Cyprus, where she grew up. The eldest of three children, her father Spyros passed away in 2021 at the age of 98 and her mother Ersi in 2023 at the age of 93. After finishing secondary school, she moved to Athens to attend the Doxiadis School, where she graduated with a degree in civil engineering.

== Career ==
After passing the special exams, Moustakoudes returned to Cyprus where she studied by correspondence at the Athens School of Interior Design. She worked in the road construction sector of the Department of Public Works, where she became a senior technical inspector and took early retirement.

=== First Lady of Cyprus (2013–2023) ===
She became First Lady of Cyprus on 28 February 2013 after her husband Nicos Anastasiades was sworn in President of Cyprus.

In 2015, she helped create the Independent Agency for Social Support to provide financial aide to young students in a vulnerable situation, which she chaired during her role as First Lady.

She represented Cyprus at the enthronement ceremony of Emperor Naruhito in 2019 and accompanied her husband at the funeral of Queen Elizabeth II in 2022.

Philippa Karsera succeeded her on 28 February 2023.

== Personal life ==
She married Nicos Anastasiades in 1971 with whom had two daughters.

Moustakoudes obtained her ikebana teaching diploma after attending a five-year programme at a Japanese school.
