= Nikolas Papadopoulos =

Cypriot politician (born 1973)

- Νικόλας Παπαδόπουλος
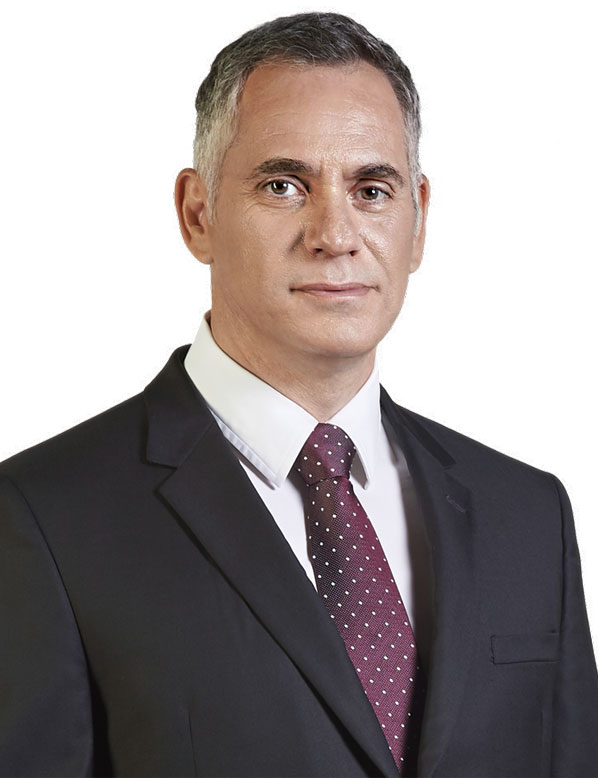
- Official portrait, 2020

President of Democratic Party
- Incumbent
- Assumed office 30 November 2013
- Preceded by: Marios Garoyian

Member of the House of Representatives
- Incumbent
- Assumed office 2006

Personal details
- Born: Nikos Papadopoulos; 22 April 1973 (age 53) Nicosia, Cyprus
- Party: Democratic Party
- Spouse: Yiota Kyprianidou
- Children: 4
- Parents: Tassos Papadopoulos (father); Fotini Papadopoulos (mother)
- Education: University College London
- Website: www.nikolas2018.eu

Nikolas Papadopoulos (Greek: Νικόλας Παπαδόπουλος; born 22 April 1973) is a Greek Cypriot lawyer and politician. He has been Member of Parliament for Nicosia since 2006 and leader of centrist DIKO party since 2013. Papadopoulos chairs the parliamentary committee on Finance and Budget. He is the son of President Tassos Papadopoulos and First Lady Fotini Papadopoulos.

== Family and education ==
Papadopoulos was born in Nicosia in 1973, the son of lawyer, politician and future president Tassos Papadopoulos and his wife Fotini. He studied law at University College London and was called to the bar at Inner Temple. During his time in London, he served as president of EFEK, the Cypriot students' federation in Britain. On his return to Cyprus, Papadopoulos began work at his father's firm called "Tassos Papadopoulos and Associates".

Papadapoulos is married and has three daughters and one son. In addition to Greek, he speaks English.

== Political career ==
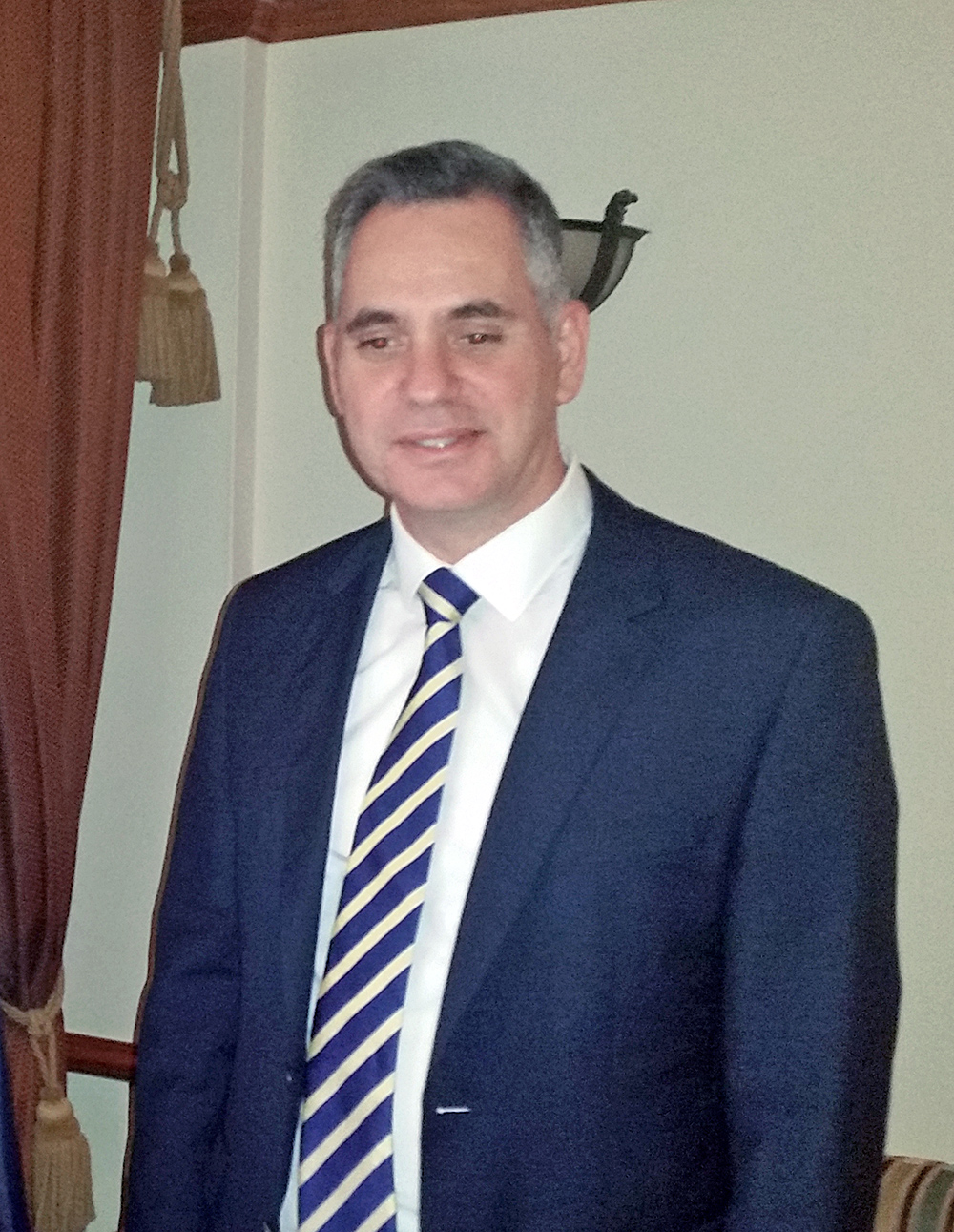

Padapoulos was elected to the House of Representatives as a DIKO MP for the Nicosia constituency in 2006. He was re-elected in 2011. He is the chairperson of the Committee on Finance and Budget as of 2019.

Starting in 2009, he became vice-president of DIKO. In the 2013 presidential election, he openly disagreed with DIKO's choice for president, Nicos Anastasiades, instead supporting Giorgos Lillikas. He disagreed with him voting yes to the Annan Plan, when the party's position at the time was no, and said that he was opposite of many of the positions of DIKO. He also disagreed with having Stavros Malas as president, who he said had the same positions as Anastasiades but was also supported by AKEL, which he accused of destroying the country. This led him to resign as vice president of DIKO, as internal party proceedings also disagreed with Papadopoulos. However, just a few months later in December, Padapoulos replaced Marios Garoyian as president of DIKO.
