= Philippa Karsera =

First Lady of Cyprus since 2023

- Φιλίππα Καρσερά
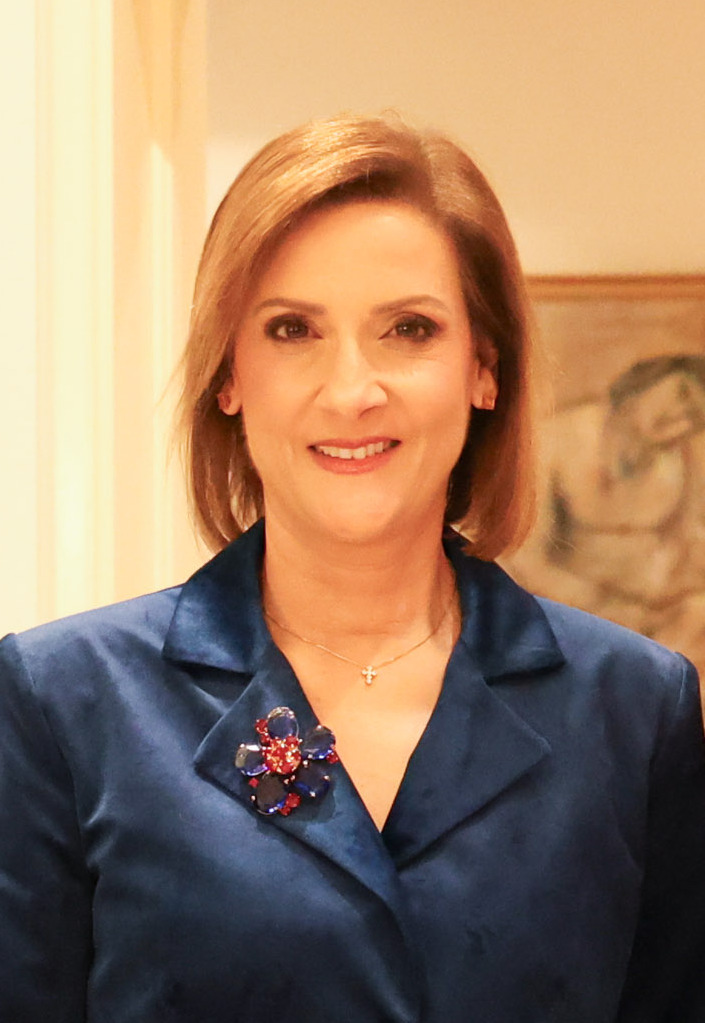
- Karsera in 2026

First Lady of Cyprus
- Incumbent
- Assumed role 28 February 2023
- President: Nikos Christodoulides
- Preceded by: Andri Moustakoudes

Personal details
- Born: 24 February 1977 (age 49) Limassol, Cyprus
- Spouse: Nikos Christodoulides (m. 2001)
- Children: 4
- Education: Panteion University; King's College London; University of Cyprus
- Occupation: diplomat

Philippa Karsera (Greek: Φιλίππα Καρσερά; born 24 February 1977) is a Cypriot diplomat who has been the first lady of Cyprus since 2023 as the wife of Nikos Christodoulides, the president of Cyprus.

== Early life ==
Karsera was born on 24 February 1977 in Limassol, Cyprus. She obtained a degree in Political Science and International and European Studies from Panteion University and a master's degree in War Studies from King's College London, and a degree in law from the University of Cyprus in 2021.

== Career ==
She began her diplomatic career in 1999 at the Ministry of Foreign Affairs, working both in Cyprus and in diplomatic missions in other countries such as the High Commissioner office to Great Britain, at the Embassy in Athens and at Cyprus's Permanent Representation in Brussels.

Between 2018 and 2021, Karsera was European affairs adviser to President Nicos Anastasiades, and between 2020 and 2022, Karsera was Deputy Secretary General for European Affairs and headed the crisis management department until February 2023.

=== First Lady of Cyprus ===
She became First Lady of Cyprus on 28 February 2023 after his husband Nikos Christodoulides was sworn in as President of Cyprus in the House of Representatives.

As First Lady, she chaired the Independent Social Support Agency until she was forced to resign in January 2026 following corruption allegations and what she called "unrelenting attack" against her, causing a political scandal. She also chairs the Radio Marathon Management Committee.

She has promoted initiatives to bring Cypriot history and culture closer to children. Karsera accompanied her husband Christodoulides at the coronation of Charles III and Camilla on 6 May 2023 and was among the guests at the wedding of Hussein, crown prince of Jordan that took place on 1 June 2023, representing herself alone Cyprus.

In September 2023 she travelled to New York during the UNGA, visiting the National September 11 Memorial & Museum where she laid flowers and visited a Greek Orthodox school and had a meeting with the Cyprus Children's Fund board. She attended the 2024 Summer Olympics opening ceremony in Paris with her husband.

In July 2024, she received the certificate for achieving zero waste at the Presidential Palace.

== Personal life ==
Karsera met Christodoulides on her first day of joining the diplomatic service in 1999 and they married in 2001. The couple have four daughters.
