= PEKA =

PEKA, the Political Committee of the Cypriot Struggle (Greek: Πολιτική Επιτροπή Κυπριακού Αγώνα, romanized: Politiki Epitropi Kypriakou Agona), was the political wing of the EOKA movement which fought against the British, for the union of the island with Greece between 1955 and 1959. It was founded in the summer of 1956 with the specific aims to:

1. Co-ordinate the political and military struggle.

2. Raise the morale of the Greek-Cypriot people.

3. Enlighten world public opinion as to the struggle, its origin and its aims.

4. Keep Greek-Cypriots united in their demand for Enosis.

PEKA published numerous leaflets with the goal of 'public enlightenment' and morale boosting, written by and for Greek Cypriots, and encouraged resistance against the British colonial forces led by Field Marshal Harding. Harding censored the local press and censored and fined the leaflet distributors before resigning as Governor of Cyprus in later 1957.

PEKA was first headed by Renos Lysiotis, who was succeeded by Michalis Maratheftis, and finally in 1958 by Tassos Papadopoulos, former President of Cyprus.
