= Alecos Markides =

Cypriot politician (1943–2020)

Alekos Markidis (Greek: Αλέκος Μαρκίδης; 23 January 1943 – 23 April 2020) was a Cypriot attorney and politician. He was elected a member of the Cypriot Parliament, in 1985, serving until 1995. He served as Attorney General of Cyprus from 1995 to 2003. He ran as a presidential candidate in the 2003 election, finishing third.

== Early and personal life ==
Markides was born on 23 January 1943 in Nicosia, which was then part of British Cyprus. He studied law at the National and Kapodistrian University of Athens, graduating in 1966 with first-class honours, before studying abroad in England. In England he became a Barrister-at-Law, being called to the bar at the Middle Temple, and started working as a lawyer in Cyprus in September 1971.

Markides was fluent in Greek and also spoke English. He was married to Ermioni Markidi, who was one of the first female lawyers in Cyprus and the first woman to run for the presidency of the Cyprus Bar Association in 1985. After facing health issues, she died on 26 January 2022. Markides died on 23 April 2020 at the age of 77.

== Political career ==
From 1979 to 1993 he served as General Secretary of Democratic Rally and from 1993 to 1995 was deputy president of the party. In 1985 he was elected as a Member of Parliament to the Parliament of Cyprus in the Nicosia Constitutency with DISY during the fifth parliamentary term. He was re-elected to the parliament during the 1991 elections, this time for the DISY-Liberal Party coalition during the parliament's sixth term. In 1995 he was appointed Attorney General of Cyprus, a position he held until 2003.
