= Lila Irene Clerides =

First Lady of Cyprus from 1993 to 2003

First Lady of Cyprus
- In office 28 February 1993 – 28 February 2003
- President: Glafcos Clerides
- Preceded by: Androulla Vassiliou
- Succeeded by: Fotini Papadopoulos
- Acting; 23 July 1974 – 7 December 1974
- President: Glafcos Clerides
- Preceded by: Vera Sampson
- Succeeded by: Position vacant

Personal details
- Born: Lila Erulkar; 31 October 1921 Ahmedabad, British India
- Died: 5 June 2007 (aged 85) Larnaca, Cyprus
- Spouse: Glafcos Clerides (m. 1947)
- Children: Katherine Clerides
- Occupation: Actress

Lila Irene Clerides (Greek: Λίλα Ειρήνη Κληρίδου; née Lila Erulkar, Greek: Λίλα Ερουλκάρ; 31 October 1921 – 5 June 2007) was the First Lady of Cyprus briefly in 1974 and again from 1993 until 2003 during the presidency of her husband, Glafcos Clerides.

== Biography ==
Lila Erulkar was born on 31 October 1921, in Ahmedabad, British India. Her father, Dr Abraham Solomon Erulkar, was a prominent Indian Jewish medical doctor in Bombay, President of the Medical Council of India, and personal physician to Mahatma Gandhi. A supporter of Indian nationalism, Dr Erulkar was a close associate of both Gandhi and Khan Abdul Ghani Khan.

Clerides was raised in the Gujarati port city of Surat, as well as Bombay. She lived and studied in Bombay until she moved to London when she was 11 years old. Erulkar studied speech at the Royal Academy of Music and became a professional actress.

Towards the end of World War II, Clerides was hired by the BBC World Service in London, where she worked with novelist George Orwell. While working in London, she met her future husband, Cypriot Glafcos Clerides, a law student and gunner for the Royal Air Force (RAF), shortly after the end of the war. Clerides had visited BBC's headquarters to see his sister, Chrysanthe, who also worked at the broadcaster. Clerides met him in the office while he waited to see Chrysanthe. The trio went out to the Vienna Café after work, and Clerides and Clerides began dating shortly afterwards.

Clerides once recalled that she went on her first date with Clerides because he was a "craggy youth who had just been released from a concentration camp" (Clerides had been held as a POW in Nazi Germany during World War II). After a few dates, Clerides proposed marriage to Clerides, who initially turned him down, telling him, "You were a prisoner of war and have seen no women, let's wait a little". However, he persisted and she eventually accepted his proposal. Clerides sent a letter to her father in India to ask his permission to marry Lila. Dr. Erulkar replied to Clerides with a short telegram, but advised that the couple wait one year to marry, according to the account in Clerides' biography. The couple complied to the request.

After waiting one year, the couple married in a civil ceremony held in London in 1947. Clerides converted to Greek Orthodox Christianity and chose "Irene" as her baptismal name. The couple had one daughter, Katherine (nicknamed Katy), born in 1949, who would serve in the House of Representatives for the Democratic Rally party.

=== First Lady of Cyprus ===
Clerides became First Lady in 1993. Upon their elevation to President and First Lady, Archbishop Chrysostomos I of Cyprus, the head of the Church of Cyprus, suggested that the couple should have a religious ceremony in the church as well, which they did in 1995 at the ages of 76 and 74 respectively.

In February 1997, Clerides and Clerides undertook an official, six-day state visit to her native India, including Mumbai. During her tour, Clerides explained that India's independence movement helped her understand Cyprus' move towards independence from the United Kingdom. She also spoke of her admiration for India, saying, "I love India. I love the people. I love its history. I was brought up as an Indian and I have to admit that my pride in India is noticed by everybody. I have not changed in that in one iota."

== Death ==
Clerides suffered from deteriorating health during her later years. She spent several weeks in hospital during the summer of 2007, but was discharged about one week before her death. Clerides died at Larnaca General Hospital, on 5 June 2007, at age 85. She was buried in a family plot in a cemetery in Nicosia.
