= Constantinos Yiorkadjis =

Cypriot politician

Constantinos Yiorkadjis (Note: This is the English-language transliteration used by the Nicosia Municipality website.) (Greek: Κωνσταντίνος Γιωρκάτζης; born 20 February 1968) is a Cypriot politician who was mayor of Nicosia from 2012 to 2024.

== Biography ==
Yiorkadjis is the son of Polycarpos Giorkatzis, a minister assassinated in 1970, and Fotini Leventis. His mother later remarried to Tassos Papadopoulos, who was elected President of Cyprus.

He enlisted in the National Guard in 1986 and rose to the rank of lieutenant. He graduated with honours in business administration and economics from Boston University in 1993. After beginning work in Boston, he worked for the Coca-Cola Hellenic Bottling Company in Athens. He worked as a sales manager, regional manager and director of research and development for Frigoglass.

In September 2011, he registered as an independent candidate for mayor of Nicosia. His candidacy was endorsed by the right-wing parties Democratic Rally and Democratic Party. With 57.11% of votes, he defeated the incumbent Eleni Mavrou.

In December 2016, Yiorkadjis won a second term with 68.86% of the vote. In 2024, he was elected president of Nicosia District.
