= Membership of Northern Cyprus in international organizations =

The Turkish Republic of Northern Cyprus unilaterally declared independence from the Republic of Cyprus on 15 November 1983. It has received diplomatic recognition as an independent state by one United Nations member state, Turkey.

Northern Cyprus has gained membership of some international intergovernmental and international non-governmental organisations in an observer capacity.

== Membership in international intergovernmental organizations ==
Northern Cyprus has gained membership of the following intergovernmental organizations:

Entity	Name used	Status	Date
Organisation of Islamic Cooperation (OIC)	Turkish Cypriot State	Observer	1979
International Organization of Turkic Culture (Türksoy)	Turkish Republic of Northern Cyprus	Observer	1994
Parliamentary Assembly of the Council of Europe (PACE)	Turkish Cypriot community	Observer	2004
Economic Cooperation Organization (ECO)	Turkish Cypriot State	Observer	2012
Organization of Turkic States (OTS)	Turkish Republic of Northern Cyprus	Observer	2022
Parliamentary Assembly of Turkic States (TURKPA)	Turkish Republic of Northern Cyprus	Observer	2023

== Membership in international non-governmental organizations (NGOs) ==
Northern Cyprus has gained membership of the following international non-governmental organizations (NGOs):

Entity	Organization represented	Status	Date
International Federation of Red Cross and Red Crescent Societies	North Cyprus Red Crescent Society	Observer	2013

== Membership in international sports organizations ==
Northern Cyprus has gained membership of the following federations:

Entity	Notes	Status	Date
Federation International de Football-Tennis Association (FIFTA)	Northern Cyprus is a full member of FIFTA.	Member	
Futsal European Federation	Northern Cyprus is a member.	Member	
European Pocket Billiard Federation (EPBF)	Northern Cyprus is a full member of EPBF.	Member	
United World Wrestling (UWR)	Northern Cyprus is an associate member of UWR.	Associate member	June 2011
World Pool-Billiard Association (WPBF)	Northern Cyprus is a member of the WPBF.	Member	
