= Troodos (community) =

Troodos Troodos
- Location in Cyprus
- Coordinates: 34°56′24″N 32°54′18″E
- Country: Cyprus
- District: Limassol District
- Time zone: UTC+2 (EET)
  - Summer (DST): UTC+3 (EEST)

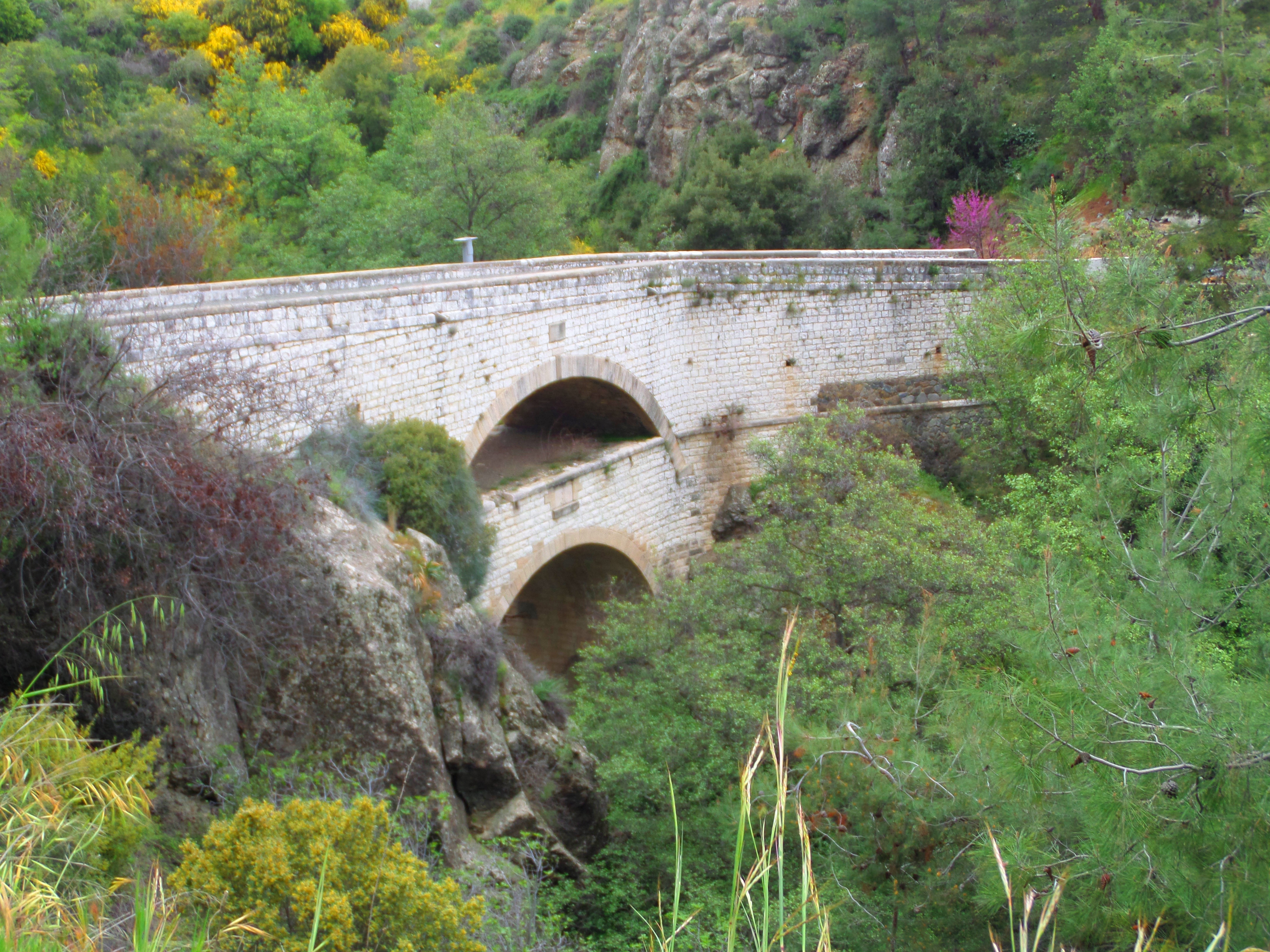
Double Bridge in Trimiklini.

Troodos (Greek: Τρόοδος) is a community in the Limassol District of Cyprus. Troodos was established in 2015. The summer residence of the president of Cyprus is located here.
