= Polycarpos Giorkatzis =

Cypriot politician (1932–1970)

Polykarpos Giorkatzis
- Πολύκαρπος Γιωρκάτζης

Minister of the Interior
- In office 16 Aug 1960 – 1 Nov 1968
- Preceded by: Tassos Papadopoulos (Provisional)
- Succeeded by: Epaminondas Komodromos

Minister of Defence
- In office 1 Jul 1964 – 1 Nov 1968
- Preceded by: Osman Örek
- Succeeded by: Epaminondas Komodromos

Personal details
- Born: 5 July 1932 Palaichori Morphou, Crown Colony of Cyprus
- Died: 15 March 1970 (aged 37) Mia Milia, Republic of Cyprus
- Spouse: Fotini Leventi (m. 1967; died 1970)
- Children: Constantinos Giorkatzis; Maria Giorkatzi

Polykarpos Giorkatzis (Greek: Πολύκαρπος Γιωρκάτζης (locally [poˈlikaɾ̥poz‿ʝoɾ̥ˈkat͡ʃis]); 5 July 1932 – 15 March 1970) was a Greek Cypriot politician. He served as the first Minister of the Interior of the Republic of Cyprus. He also served as provisional minister of Labour in the period leading to Cyprus being proclaimed an independent state. Before entering the political stage he fought for EOKA. His political career evolved from a staunch supporter of Makarios to becoming one of the archbishop's principal political rivals. He was assassinated in 1970.

== EOKA years ==
Giorkatzis joined the ranks of EOKA, the Greek Cypriot organization fighting against British rule in Cyprus, in his twenties and assumed the nom de guerre Laertes. He became regional commander of EOKA operations in Nicosia. He was nicknamed "Houdini" in reference to his several successful escapes including from the Nicosia hospital on 31 August 1956 and from Nicosia Central Prisons on 2 May 1958. After the end of the struggle he claimed to have been tortured whilst held captive by the colonial security forces.

== Political career ==
=== Provisional Minister of Labour ===
Giorkatzis was appointed Minister of Labour in the transitional government set up immediately before the Republic of Cyprus became independent. The Ministry of Labour, however, was effectively run by Tassos Papadopoulos, who held the official title of Minister of the Interior. British pressure had forced Makarios to distance Giorkatzis, a former active EOKA member from the Ministry of Interior which was in charge of internal security, police and intelligence.

=== Minister of the Interior ===
Following the first elections in 1960, Archbishop Makarios III, officially swapped the ministries between the two men. Typically for the ex-EOKA ministers in Makarios' first Council of Ministers, Giorkatzis was very young at the time, aged 29. He also had no higher education.

As Minister of the Interior, Giorkatzis quickly became notorious for using the police as his personal army. It is rumoured that he also set up a vast information network. He was also the leader of the underground Greek Cypriot pro-Enosis movement, initially known simply as the Organisation, which later clashed with the Turkish Cypriot TMT in the intercommunal strife which began in December 1963. Giorkatzis' code name in the Organisation was "Akritas", another name for the legendary Byzantine hero Digenis, an obvious link to the pseudonym of EOKA leader Georgios Grivas. Giorkatzis is alleged to have authored the so-called Akritas plan (plan of action in case of clashes between the Greek and Turkish communities in Cyprus). The document became famous after it was leaked to the press, and acquired its popular name from the codename signed under it. With Glafkos Clerides he established the first centre right party of Cyprus, attracting many of the EOKA members in its ranks.

=== Links to failed Greek PM assassination ===
In 1968, Giorkatzis offered assistance to Alekos Panagoulis, a Greek political activist (and later politician), who opposed the rise of the military junta in Greece, in his attempted assassination of dictator Georgios Papadopoulos on 13 August 1968. Panagoulis was arrested shortly after the failure of the attempt. It is not likely Giorkatzis was acting out of ideology. It is much more probable that he attempted to use Panagoulis as part of some greater plan, since there were growing signs of disagreement between the government of Cyprus under President and Archbishop Makarios and the military junta in Greece. What is known is that Giorkatzis simultaneously attempted to ship explosives and weapons to Greece using diplomatic bag prerogatives.

Despite the torture he was subjected to, Panagoulis revealed nothing. However, the Giorkatzis connection became known to the junta and Archbishop Makarios, President of the Republic of Cyprus, was forced by the junta to ask for Giorkatzis' resignation. The dictator Georgios Papadopoulos, the target of the attempt, had been godfather at the baptism of Giorkatzis' first child, Constantinos, just a year earlier, which particularly incensed Papadopoulos.

== Assassination ==
A week later, Giorkatzis drove to a secret night rendezvous in an open area outside the village of Mia Milia. He asked a close associate to accompany him, but dropped him off some distance from the meeting point and drove on alone. As Giorkatzis' car approached another car parked at the meeting point, the occupants of the other car opened fire with automatic weapons. One of them then walked up to Giorkatzis' car and delivered a coup de grâce. They then drove off leaving Giorkatzis dead at the scene. Fanis Demetriou, the police officer in charge of the investigation, quickly found evidence pointing towards the same two Greek officers in Makarios' entourage who had been found to be involved in the Hermes plot. After he reported this to his superiors, Demetriou was ordered off the case. The two particular Greek officers were eventually only questioned several weeks later, at which time they gave identical accounts of their whereabouts on the night of the murder. They both left the island shortly thereafter and never returned.

Giorkatzis' widow Fotini married Tassos Papadopoulos, then Minister of Labour, two years after her husband's death. Papadopoulos and Giorkatzis had been close friends, and Papadopoulos had been best man at Giorkatzis' wedding.

Though Giorkatzis planned and executed an operation to assassinate the President of the Republic, and though his role in this has been acknowledged by the courts, the yearly church service in his memory is attended by prominent figures among the Greek Cypriot political leadership and at least one street has been named after him. A museum honoring the most distinguished aspects of his life is active in his birthplace in Palaichori, formally opened in 2002 by the then President Glafkos Clerides.

== Quotes ==
- "Anything can happen now. To Makarios, people are like lemons: when they are squeezed dry, he throws them away." Quoted soon after the failed assassination attempt on Makarios on 8 March 1970. Giorkatzis was removed from a plane whilst trying to flee to Beirut.
