= Lemithou =

Lemithou Λεμύθου
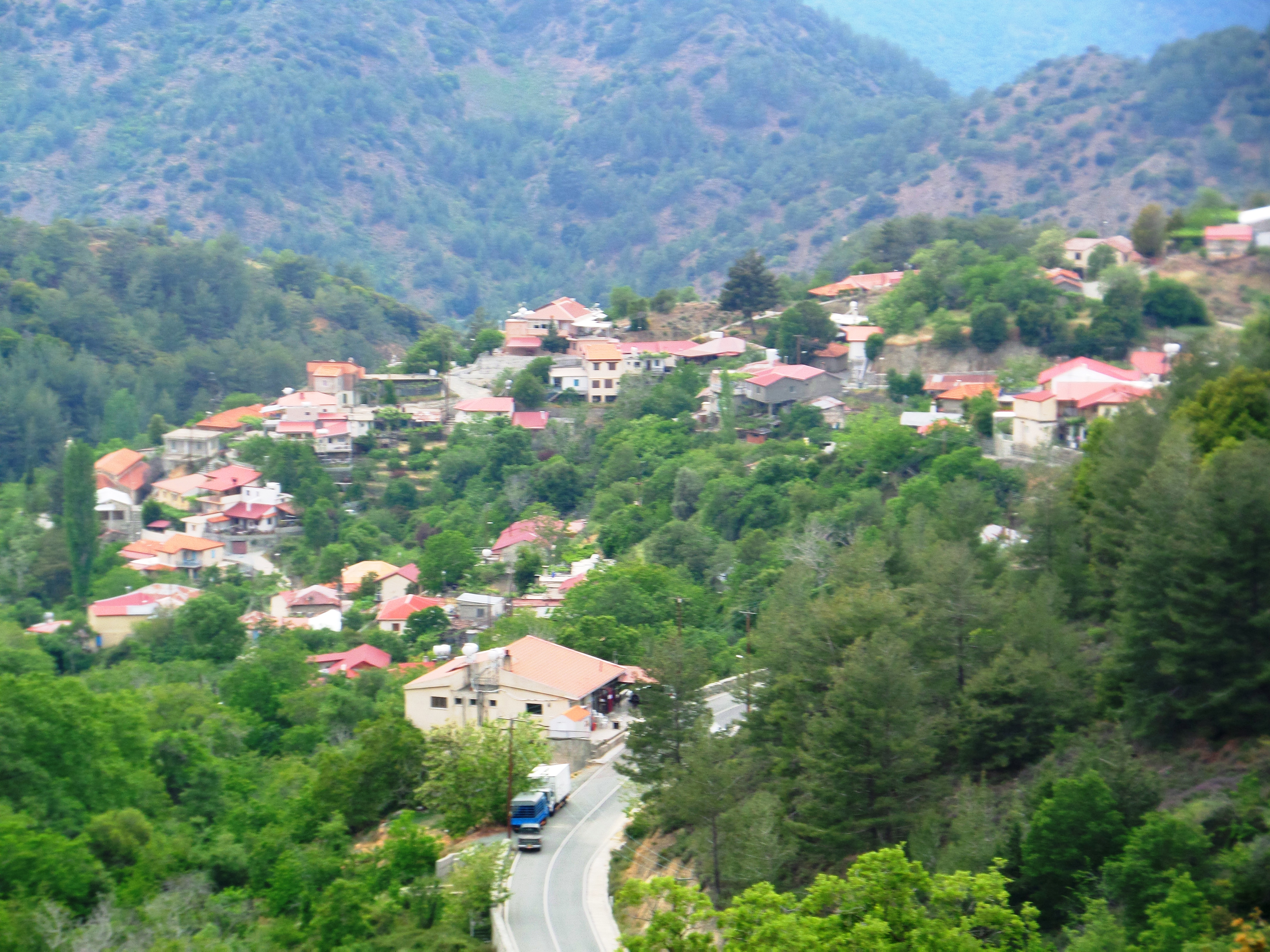

- Location in Cyprus
- Coordinates: 34°56′57″N 32°48′41″E
- Country: Cyprus
- District: Limassol District

Population (2001)
  - Total: 108
- Time zone: UTC+2 (EET)
  - Summer (DST): UTC+3 (EEST)
- Website: http://www.lemythou.org/

Lemithou (Greek: Λεμύθου), also spelt Lemythou, is a village in the Limassol District of Cyprus, located 3km west of Prodromos, the highest village in Cyprus, in the Marathasa Valley of the Troodos Mountains.

Lemithou is the birthplace of Cypriot philanthropist and businessman Anastasios George Leventis, who made his fortune in Gold Coast (now Ghana) and Nigeria.

Lemithou is also known for the Mitsis Commercial School of Lemithou. The book Mitsis Commercial School of Lemithou (1912-2004) (Η Εμπορική Σχολή Μιτσή Λεμύθου (1912-2004)) by Costis Kokkinoftas, published in Nicosia in 2005, is presented in the 19 December 2013 issue of Alithia newspaper by Maria Piliotou. The founder of the school was Demosthenis Mitsis and the first principal was the very well known Cypriot poet Demetris Lipertis.
