= Anastasios George Leventis =

Greek Cypriot businessman (1902–1978)

- Born: December 1902; Lemythou, Cyprus
- Died: October 25, 1978 (aged 75)
- Occupations: Entrepreneur, founder and owner of Leventis Group

Anastasios George Leventis (Greek: Αναστάσιος Γ. Λεβέντης; December 1902 – October 25, 1978) was a Greek Cypriot businessman who founded a major merchandise trading firm, A.G. Leventis (Nigeria) Plc, in West Africa. A dominant figure in the economy of many West African countries and especially Nigeria, he was awarded the title of Babalaje of Egbaland by Alake Ladapo Ademola.

His daughter Fotini first married the politician Polycarpos Giorkatzis and after his assassination she married another politician Tassos Papadopoulos, who eventually became President of Cyprus.

== Early life ==
Leventis was born in the village of Lemythou, Limassol District, in the Troodos Mountains. His father was a minister of the Greek Orthodox Church and was also a schoolmaster. Leventis attended Mitsis Commercial School. At the age of 16, he traveled to France to look for employment and educational opportunities. In 1920, he took up a job opportunity in Nigeria working at a trading post in Nwaniba, Akwa Ibom State.

== Career ==
In 1922, Leventis joined the firm of A.J. Tangalakis in Abeokuta, Ogun State. He developed most of his connections with Nigeria while working in the city. When his firm merged with G. B. Ollivant, Leventis stayed with the amalgamated entity and rose to become the general manager of G. B. Ollivant in Ghana. In 1937, he left the firm after it was acquired by United Africa Company. Leventis then formed his own company and started out as a produce buyer, partly financed by some British cotton manufacturers. He was assisted in the new venture by his brother C. P. Leventis, who organized the Nigerian branch in 1942, and a friend, G. E. Keralakis.

In Ghana, Leventis was sympathetic to the cause of African nationalists. He was a friend of Kwame Nkrumah and J. B. Danquah. When a riot flared up in the country, many foreign stores were burnt and closed but only Leventis-owned stores remained untouched and were opened throughout the period of conflict. After being elected president of Ghana, Nkrumah sought to make him Ghanaian ambassador to France.

Leventis established a branch of his company in Nigeria, called A.G. Leventis Nigeria Plc. Within a few years, the Nigerian company expanded its business line from cotton exports to merchandise trading and secured new sources of supplies. In the late 1940s, motivated by diversification and modernization, the firm changed its strategy. In 1960, the Leventis Group speedily completed the Federal Palace Hotel at the request of the Nigerian government, the hotel serving as accommodation for guests expected during Nigeria's independence celebrations.

By the 1960s, his firm had grown to become one of the largest distributors in Nigeria and one of the largest merchandise traders in the West African region. In Nigeria, he restructured the business from general trading into a specialized trading firm and established various department stores. During this period, he thrived as a result of the nation's relatively open economy, as it was not until the 1970s that economic nationalism became a dominant initiative. His marketing style made the Leventis name familiar to many customers in Nigeria. Apart from his sympathy for the nationalist movement in Africa, he also gave his support to his native country's independence movement. He developed a friendship with Archbishop Makarios III, who appointed him Cyprus' ambassador to UNESCO and awarded him the medal of St. Barnabas.

The Egba Scholarship Scheme, popularly known as "A.G. Leventis (Egba) Scholarship Scheme", which awards study funds to both undergraduate and postgraduate students of Abeokuta and Egbaland in general, was established in his name and still exists.

== Philanthropy ==
After his death in 1978, the A. G. Leventis Foundation was established in 1979 by his nephew Constantine Leventis. It has a primary focus on the cultural heritage of Cyprus and Greece, especially reflected in its collections of Cypriot antiquities displayed in several museums around the world, its restoration of cultural monuments, and its sponsorship of scholarships for postgraduate work in several fields including archaeology and agriculture. The foundation also sponsors work in the areas of environmental protection and medical research.

In 1987, the A. G. Leventis Gallery was opened in the British Museum to display Cypriot antiquities from the early Bronze Age to the Roman era. In 1997, a similar display was opened at the Fitzwilliam Museum, and in 2000 another at the Metropolitan Museum of Art, New York.

In 2008, the A. G. Leventis Foundation endowed a new chair at Cambridge University in Greek culture, the A. G. Leventis Professor of Greek Culture. Other endowments by the foundation include, in 1997, a visiting professorship in Greek studies at the University of Edinburgh, in 2015 a chair in Byzantine Studies also at the University of Edinburgh, and in 2017 a professorship of Greek Culture to be held alongside the Regius Professorship of Greek at Trinity College Dublin.

== Private life ==
The earliest records of his family go back to the 18th century, when a young ancestor had traveled to the Peloponnese to join the abortive 1770 uprising against Ottoman rule (known to history as the Orlov revolt). By the time of his birth, his family counted a number of distinguished clerics, who served at the highest levels — metropolitan bishops, patriarchs from the Orthodox churches of Jerusalem and of Antioch, as well as from the Church of Cyprus.

He was uncle to Constantine "Dino" Leventis (1938–2002), businessman and major art benefactor of Hellenic art at the Metropolitan Museum of Art in New York and other museums around the world: in April 2000, the Metropolitan Museum opened the A.G. Leventis Foundation Gallery, where the museum's collection of Cypriot sculpture, terracottas, vases, jewelry and coins from the 5th and 4th centuries BC are displayed. The foundation also helped pay for similar galleries devoted to ancient Greek and Cypriot art in the British Museum, the Louvre in Paris and the Fitzwilliam Museum at Cambridge, among others, according to its latest annual report. In Greece, it has financed extensive archeological work.
