= Tassos Papadopoulos =

President of Cyprus from 2003 to 2008

- Τάσσος Παπαδόπουλος
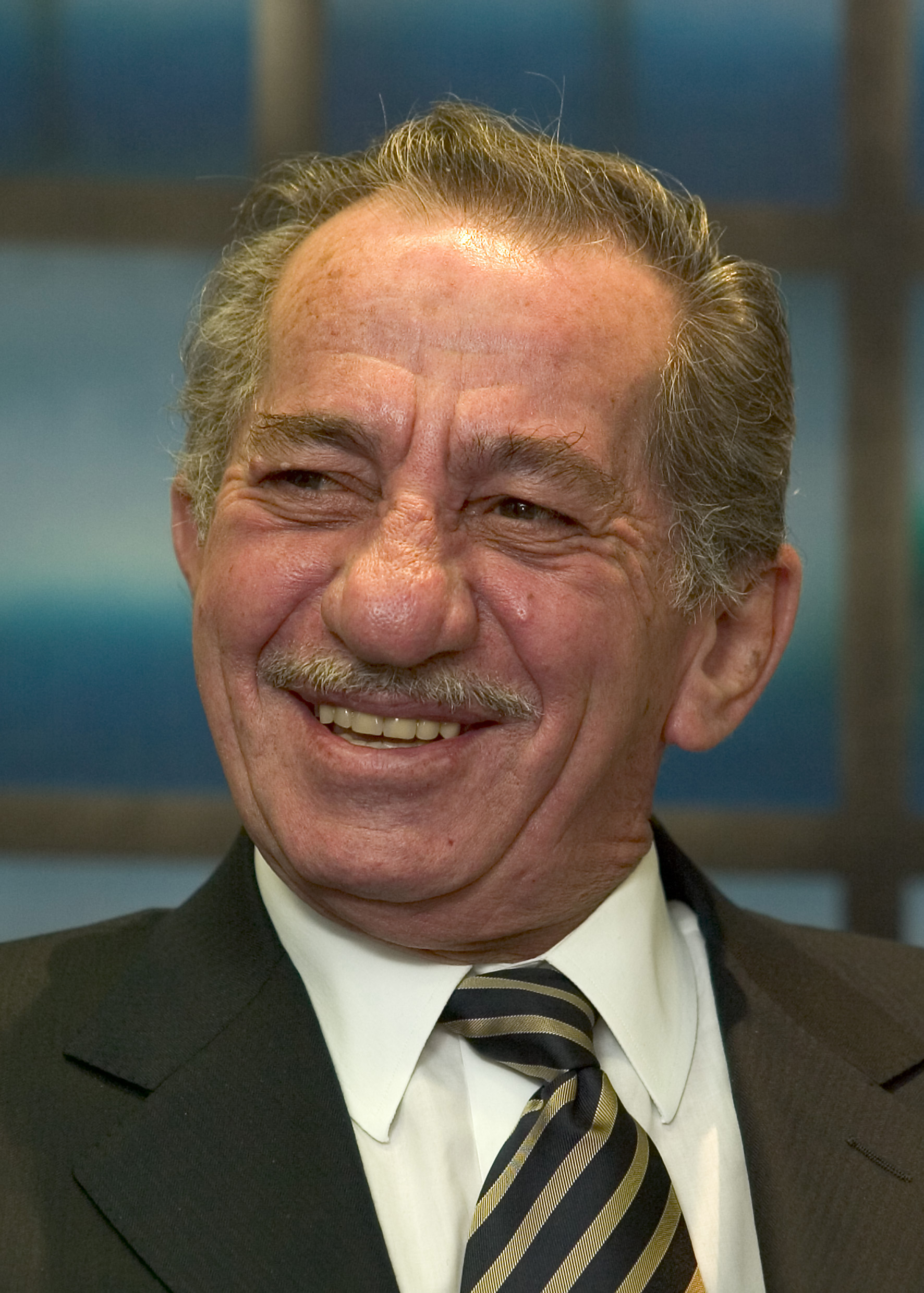
- Papadopoulos in 2005

5th President of Cyprus
- In office 28 February 2003 – 28 February 2008
- Preceded by: Glafcos Clerides
- Succeeded by: Demetris Christofias

2nd President of the Democratic Party
- In office 7 October 2000 – 22 October 2006
- Preceded by: Spyros Kyprianou
- Succeeded by: Marios Karoyian

Member of the House of Representatives
- In office 1991–2003
- Constituency: Nicosia

2nd President of the House of Representatives
- In office 22 July 1976 – 20 September 1976
- Preceded by: Glafcos Clerides
- Succeeded by: Spyros Kyprianou

Member of the Cabinet
- In office 1960–1974
- President: Makarios III
- As Minister of: Interior; Labour; Finance; Health; Agriculture

Personal details
- Born: 7 January 1934 Nicosia, British Cyprus
- Died: 12 December 2008 (aged 74) Nicosia, Cyprus
- Party: Democratic Party
- Spouse: Fotini Georkadji (m. 1972)
- Children: Nikolas; Anastasia
- Education: King's College London

Efstathios "Tassos" Nikolaou Papadopoulos (Greek: Ευστάθιος (Τάσσος) Νικολάου Παπαδόπουλος; 7 January 1934 – 12 December 2008) was a Cypriot politician and barrister, who served as President of Cyprus from 2003 to 2008.

An experienced member of the Makarios III’s cabinet, Papadopoulos took charge of the country’s parliament in 1976, two years after the Turkish invasion, and became one the island’s most notable proponents of a hardline position on Cypriot reunification. It was this sentiment that he successfully employed as a candidate in the 2003 presidential election, after which he directed the population to reject the Annan Plan. However, his inability to negotiate an alternative contributed to his failure to win re-election in 2008, despite generally maintaining high approval ratings during his presidency.

== Early life ==
His parents were Nicolas and Aggeliki from Assia. He was the first of three children. Papadopoulos attended the Ayios Kassianos and Elenio primary schools in Nicosia and then the Pancyprian Gymnasium. His father's circle which included lawyers and judges, were influential on his future career and he went on to study law at King's College London before becoming a barrister-at-law through Gray's Inn.

His life in London would prove to be pivotal in his future political life. In the second year of his studies he lived with future politician Spyros Kyprianou and Lellos Demetriades (lawyer and future mayor of Nicosia) both of whom had started their political life by founding EFEKA (short for National Student Union of Cypriots in England).

== Political career ==
=== Militant ===
Papadopoulos returned to Cyprus on 20 March 1955, ten days before the start of EOKA's armed struggle against British colonialism. At first he joined EOKA and became regional chief of operations in Nicosia, whilst Polycarpos Yiorkadjis was held captive. Soon however, he became active in PEKA, the political arm of the EOKA guerrilla organisation. In 1958, aged 24, he became PEKA's general secretary.

He took part in the London Conference in 1959 and was one of the two delegates (besides the AKEL delegates) who voted against the signing of the London and Zurich Agreements. He was also one of the four representatives of the Greek Cypriot side at the Constitutional Commission which drafted the Constitution of the Republic of Cyprus.

=== Ministerial appointments ===
Following independence, aged 25 and to his own surprise he was appointed first as provisional Minister of Internal Affairs and soon afterwards as Minister of Labour. He was the youngest member of the new cabinet and remains the youngest minister to date to serve in a Cypriot government. For the following 12 years he served successively as Minister of the Interior, Minister of Finance, Minister of Labour and Social Insurance, Minister of Health and Minister of Agriculture and Natural Resources.

=== United Party ===
In 1969 he co-founded the Eniaion Komma (United Party) a party aligned to and supportive of Makarios. Glafcos Clerides became president whilst Papadopoulos remained vice-president of the party. At the Parliamentary elections held on 15 July 1970 he was elected member of the House of Representatives, standing as an Eniaion Party candidate for the Nicosia constituency. However, following a difference of opinion with the leader he later resigned from the party.

=== Imprisonment during the 1974 coup ===
In 1974, Papadopoulos was imprisoned by the military forces responsible for the coup d'état. Belonging to Makarios' cabinet made him a prime target and he was rounded up in Famagusta where he was imprisoned. He was released on the evening before the first Turkish invasion of Cyprus.

=== Other roles ===
He served as advisor to the first representative of the Greek Cypriot side in the intercommunal talks, Glafcos Clerides, until April 1976 and subsequently he took up that post himself, serving until July 1978. He represented Cyprus at many international conferences, particularly the annual congresses of the International Labour Organization (ILO). Furthermore he represented the Greek Cypriot community in many recourses by Cyprus filed at the United Nations and the Council of Europe.

Until his election he practised law in Nicosia.

Standing as an independent candidate, he was re-elected in the election of 5 September 1976. From 22 July to 20 September 1976, he served as President of the House of Representatives. In the 19 May 1991 parliamentary elections he was elected member of the House of Representatives, standing as a candidate for the Democratic Party in the Nicosia constituency. He was re-elected on 26 May 1996.

=== Democratic Party leadership ===
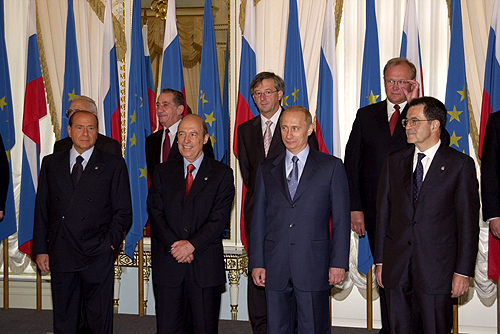
Photo session of participants in Russia – EU Summit

On 7 October 2000, he was elected unopposed as the President of the Democratic Party during the historic electoral congress at which the founder of the Party, Spyros Kyprianou, stood down. At the 27 May 2001 elections he was re-elected at the head of the Democratic Party ticket.

He was a member of the National Council, Chairman of the Standing Parliamentary Committee on European Affairs and member of the Committee on Selection and the Committee on Financial and Budgetary Affairs. He was also Co-chairman of the Joint Cyprus-EU Parliamentary Committee.

=== President of Cyprus ===
He campaigned for the 2003 presidential election on a platform that he would be able to secure a better deal over the Cyprus dispute than the incumbent Glafcos Clerides. He was backed not by just his own party, Diko, but also the party of the Left AKEL and social democratic Kisos and even by many nationalist members of the Democratic Rally of which 61% of party members opposed the plan.

Papadopoulos assumed the Presidency on 28 February 2003 after winning a first round majority with 51.51% of the vote. Before the 2004 Annan Plan Referendum he urged Greek Cypriots to vote No, declaring "I received a state. I will not deliver a community".

Papadopoulos was a candidate for a second term in office in the 2008 presidential election. In the first round, held on 18 February, he placed third, slightly behind Dimitris Christofias and Ioannis Kasoulides with about 31.8% of the vote, and was therefore eliminated from the second round. He had enjoyed a slight advantage in opinion polls prior to the election and his elimination was regarded as a surprise. He promptly conceded defeat on the day of the election.

== Personal life ==
Papadapoulos was an ethnic Greek Cypriot.

He was married to Fotini Georkadji, daughter of Anastasios G. Leventis and widow of assassinated politician Polykarpos Georkadjis, from 1972 until his death in 2008. Papadopoulos had been best man at his wife's first wedding.

They had two children, Nikolas and Anastasia, and Papadopoulos raised Fotini's older children Constantinos and Maria from her marriage to Polykarpos Georkadjis.

Tassos Papadopoulos died on 12 December 2008 at 13:05 pm of small cell lung carcinoma. He was a heavy smoker. Papadopoulos had been admitted to the Intensive Care Unit of the Nicosia General Hospital on 22 November for the disease. The funeral took place on 15 December 2008 in Agia Sophia Church in Nicosia.

On 11 December 2009, it was reported that thieves had dug up the grave and stolen the body of the former president. Republic of Cyprus President Dimitris Christofias described it as "sacrilege". On 8 March 2010, the body was discovered in a cemetery near the capital. The family expressed their relief and denied any ransom had been paid.

Cypriot police said DNA results obtained early on 9 March 2010 positively identified the corpse as Papadopoulos's, after a telephone tip-off led police to the body the previous night.

== Honours and awards ==
- Grand Star of the Decoration of Honour for Services to the Republic of Austria (Austria, 2007)
  - Grand Decoration of Honour in Gold with Sash for Services to the Republic of Austria for Fotini Papadopoulou, his wife (Austria, 2007)
- Grand Cross of the Grand Order of King Tomislav (Croatia, 13 November 2006)
- Grand Cross with Chain of the National Order of Merit (Malta, 2005)
- Collar of the Order of the Cross of Terra Mariana (Estonia, 2004)
- Commander Grand Cross with Chain of the Order of Three Stars (Latvia, 2007)
- 1st Class of the Order of the White Double Cross (Slovakia, 2007)
- Medal of the Order for Exceptional Merits (Slovenia, 2006)

Political offices
Preceded by Glafcos Clerides	President of Cyprus; 2003–2008	Succeeded by Dimitris Christofias
