= Presidential Palace, Nicosia =

Presidential Palace of the Republic of Cyprus

Coordinates: 35.1556°N 33.3473°E

Presidential Palace of Nicosia
- Προεδρικό Μέγαρο (Greek)
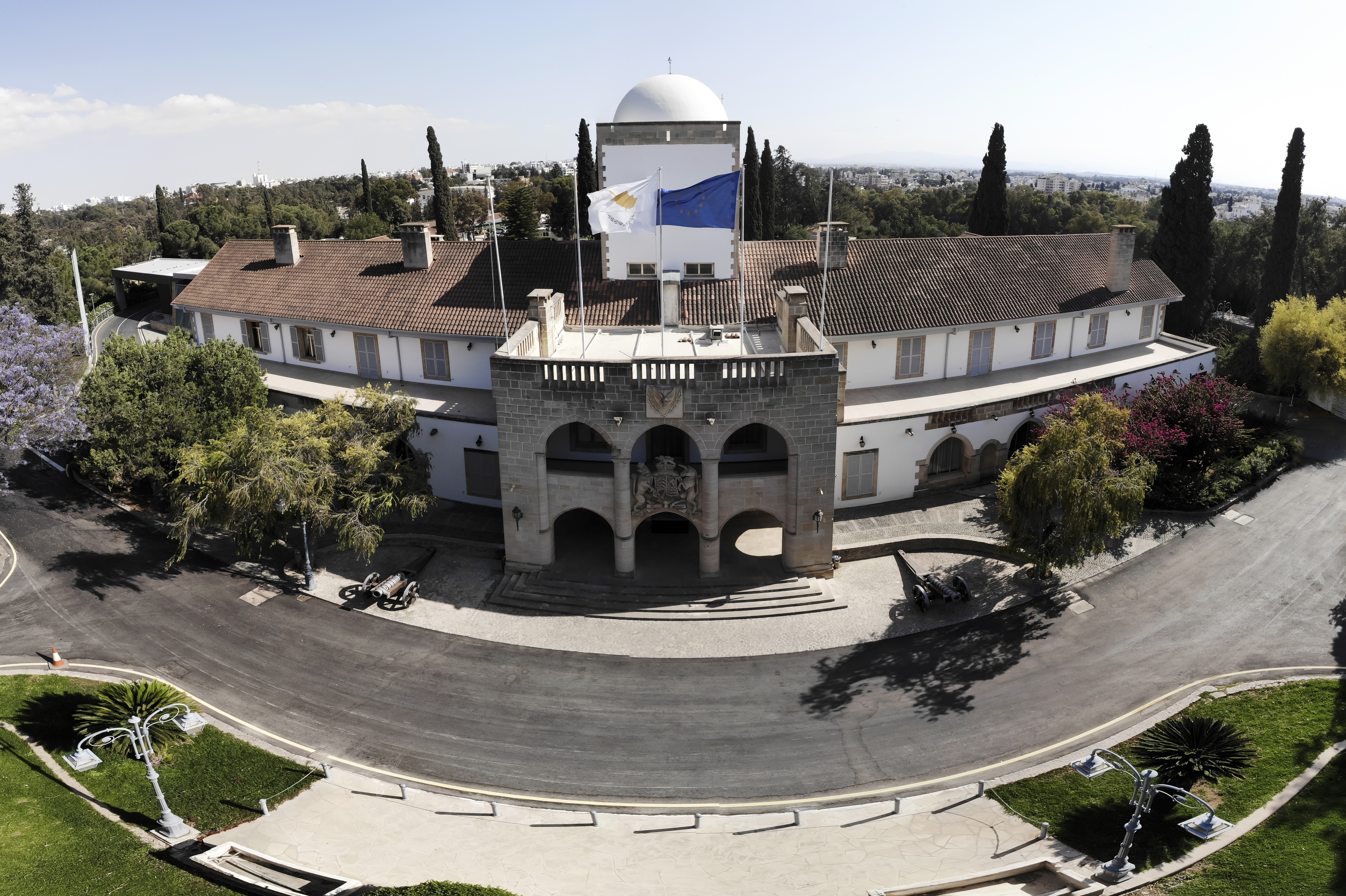
- The Presidential Palace in May 2021
- Interactive map of the Presidential Palace of Nicosia area

General information
- Type: Palace
- Location: 584W+7W6; Strovolos 1400; Cyprus
- Current tenants: President Nikos Christodoulides, First Lady Philippa Karsera, and their four children
- Construction started: 1932
- Completed: 1937
- Owner: Government of Cyprus

Design and construction
- Architect: Maurice Webb
- Architecture firm: Nicosia Public Works Department

The Presidential Palace (Greek: Προεδρικό Μέγαρο; Turkish: Cumhurbaşkanlığı Sarayı) is the official residence and principal workplace of the president of Cyprus. It is located in the Strovolos area of Nicosia and is surrounded by a thick pine woodland. The building was formerly called Government House.

== History ==
The original building was a prefabricated structure erected in November 1878 on a site known as Snake Hill, on which Richard I of England is said to have set up camp. The building was shipped by the War Office from England to Ceylon, its original destination; by the time it reached Egypt, it was no longer required in Ceylon and was diverted to Cyprus. The building arrived in Larnaca and was transported to Nicosia in boxes on the backs of camels.

The building was burned down during the 1931 Cyprus Revolt. As a result of the disturbances, a special law was enacted by Sir Ronald Storrs, Governor of Cyprus, on 21 December 1931, whereby the Greek Cypriot inhabitants had to pay for the construction of a new Government House. A total of £34,315 was demanded, payable by 30 June 1932; the amounts required from various towns included £14,000 from Nicosia, £5,500 from Limassol, £5,000 from Famagusta, £2,000 from Larnaca, £500 from Paphos, and £6,315 from various villages.

The new building was designed by Maurice Webb, and constructed by J V Hamilton & L F Weldon of the Nicosia Public Works Department. The main structure was built of sandstone from Gerolakkos, with harder sandstone from Limassol used for the staircases. Construction was completed in 1937, at a total cost of £70,000. Among the Palace's most prominent features are the British coat of arms and four gargoyles with human heads depicting the British general foreman in charge of construction, the head mason, the head carpenter, and an unknown labourer.

Originally named Government House, the building was renamed the Presidential Palace after Cyprus gained independence from British rule in 1960. It suffered fire damage by the Cypriot National Guard and EOKA-B during the 1974 Cypriot coup d'état, and was rebuilt by the Public Works Department and Philippou Brothers in 1977. The rebuilding costs were paid by the Greek government.

On 28 May 2010, it was announced that the building was to have a €1.2 million upgrade to reduce its carbon emissions. The project included solar panels in the car park, a new ventilation system, and new windows. A further €2.7 million was spent to build a new hall for Cyprus' tenure as European Union President from July to December 2012.

== Gallery ==
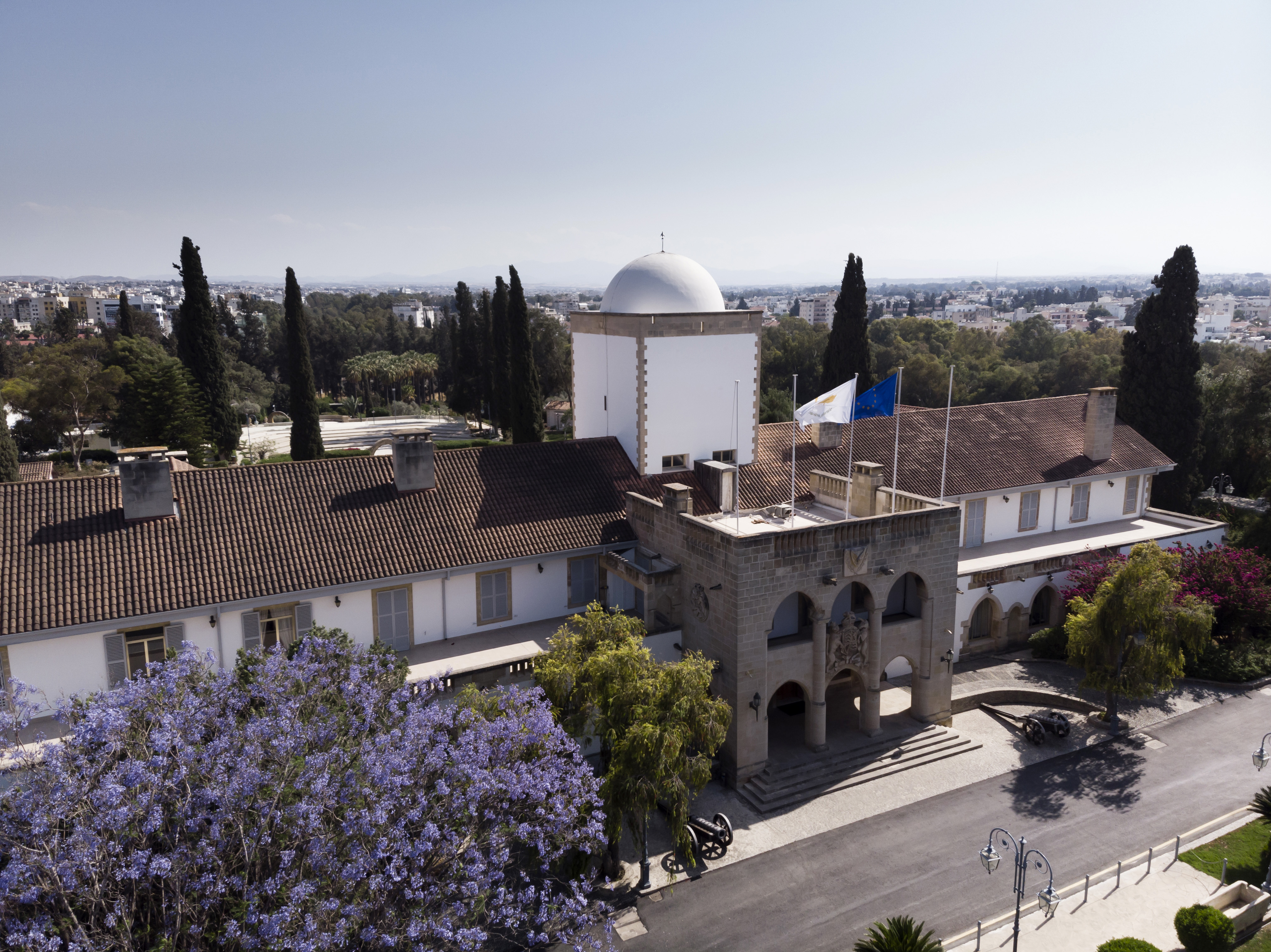
The Presidential Palace in May 2021

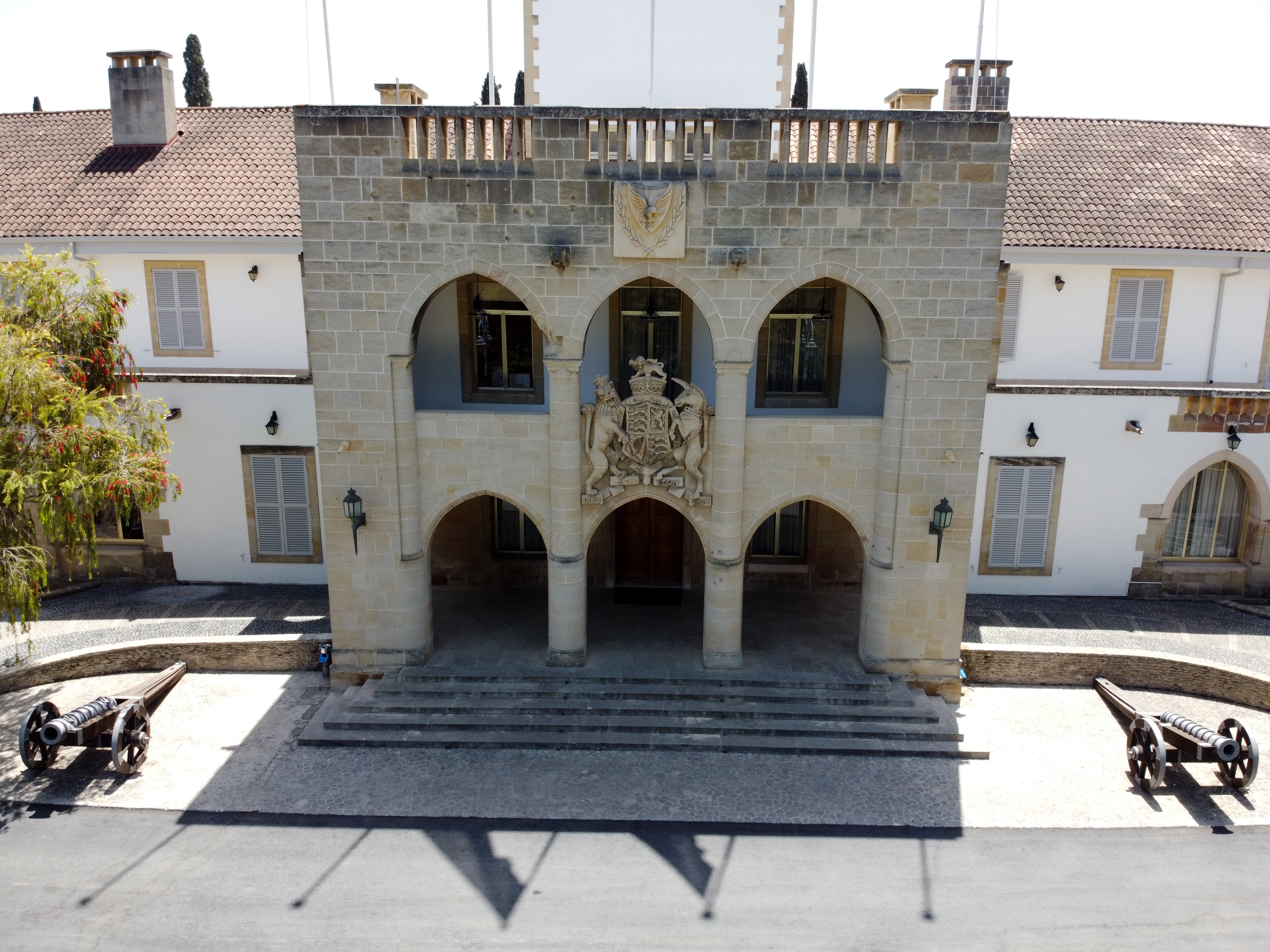
Entrance to the Presidential Palace entrance in May 2021, showing the British coat of arms above the doorway

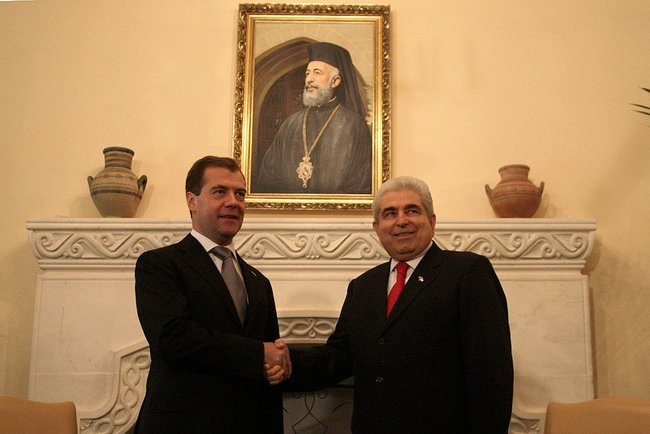
Cypriot President Demetris Christofias with Russian President Dmitry Medvedev at the Palace in October 2010

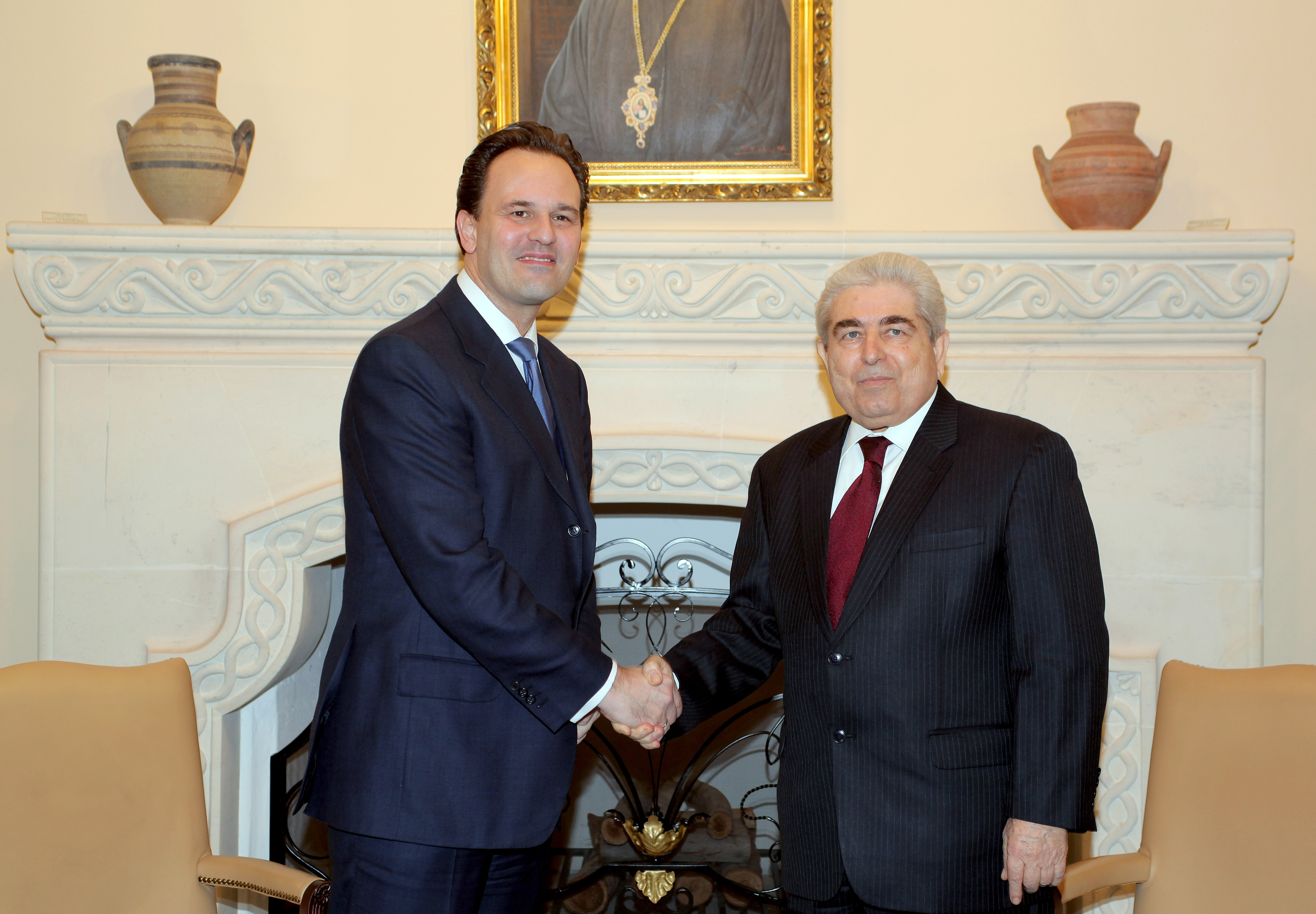
Cypriot President Demetris Christofias with Greek Minister of Foreign Affairs Dimitrios Droutsas at the Palace in February 2011

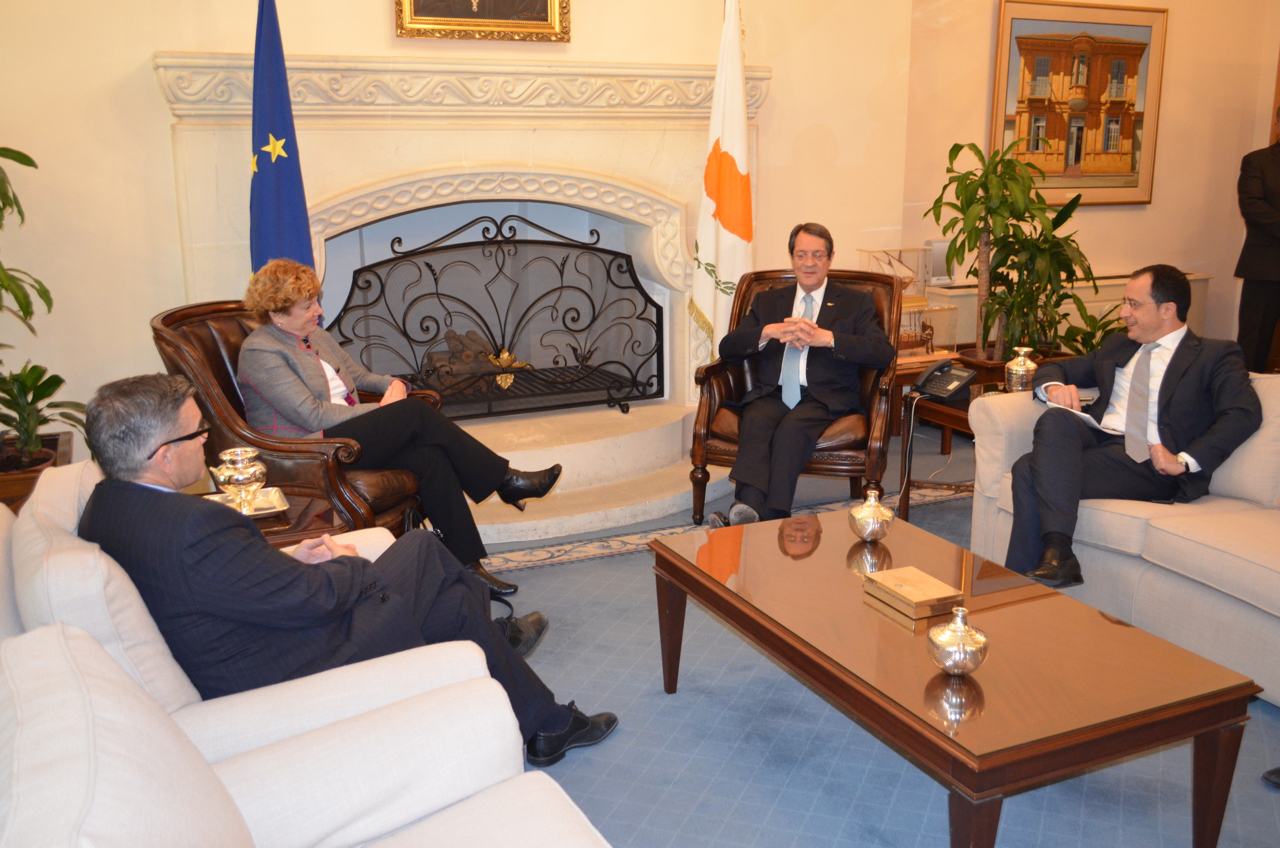
Cypriot President Nicos Anastasiades and his future successor, Government Spokesman Nikos Christodoulides, with U.S. Ambassador to Cyprus Kathleen A. Doherty at the Palace in February 2018

== See also ==
- Government Houses of the British Empire and Commonwealth
- Presidential Cottage (Troodos)
