= Glafcos Clerides =

President of Cyprus from 1993 to 2003

- Γλαύκος Κληρίδης
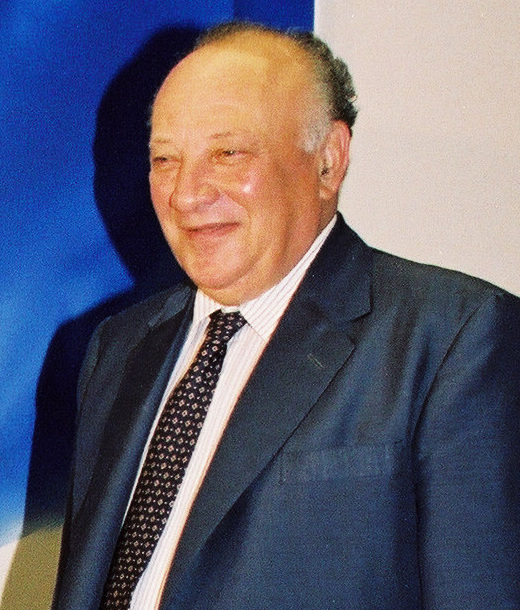
- Clerides in 1993

4th President of Cyprus
- In office 28 February 1993 – 28 February 2003
- Preceded by: George Vassiliou
- Succeeded by: Tassos Papadopoulos
- In office 23 July 1974 – 7 December 1974; Acting
- Preceded by: Nikos Sampson (acting)
- Succeeded by: Makarios III

1st President of the House of Representatives
- In office 16 August 1960 – 22 July 1976
- Preceded by: New office
- Succeeded by: Tassos Papadopoulos

1st President of DISY
- In office 1976–1993
- Succeeded by: Yiannakis Matsis

Member of the House of Representatives
- In office 16 August 1960 – 19 September 1976
- Constituency: Nicosia
- In office 4 June 1981 – 27 February 1993
- Constituency: Nicosia

Personal details
- Born: 24 April 1919 Nicosia, British Cyprus (now Cyprus)
- Died: 15 November 2013 (aged 94) Engomi, Cyprus
- Party: Patriotic Front (1959–1969); Eniaion (1969–1976); Democratic Rally (from 1976)
- Spouse: Lila Erulkar (m. 1947; died 2007)
- Education: King's College London

Military service
- Branch/service: Royal Air Force
- Years of service: 1942–1944

Glafcos Ioannou Clerides (Greek: Γλαύκος Ιωάννου Κληρίδης; 24 April 1919 – 15 November 2013) was a Cypriot statesman who served as President of Cyprus in 1974 and from 1993 to 2003.

A barrister and former Royal Air Force pilot, Clerides played an important role in the Cypriot struggle for independence, first as a member of the anti-colonial guerrilla organization EOKA and later in the drafting of the country's constitution. He then served as the first Speaker of the House of Representatives from 1960 to 1976, and briefly took over the presidency of Cyprus on an interim basis following the failure of the 1974 coup, overseeing the island's defence amidst the Turkish invasion.

Clerides later founded the centre-right Democratic Rally in 1976 and won the presidential election as its candidate in 1993, before securing a second term in 1998. He failed to win a third term in 2003. As President, Clerides presided over a period of significant economic growth and was instrumental in Cyprus' accession to the European Union. Widely respected for his political and legal acumen, he remained an influential figure in Cypriot politics until his death in 2013.

== Personal life ==
Glafcos Clerides was born on 24 April 1919 in Nicosia. He was the eldest son of the lawyer John Clerides and Elli Argyridou. He had one sister, Chrysanthi, and one brother, Xanthos. Clerides married Lila Erulkar (31 October 1921 – 5 June 2007), the Indian Jewish daughter of Abraham Erulkar, personal physician to Mahatma Gandhi, in London in 1947. They had one daughter, Katherine (born 1949 in London), who went on to serve as a member of the House of Representatives for the Democratic Rally. He died at Evangelistria Clinic, on 15 November 2013, at age 94.

== World War II ==
During World War II, Clerides served in the British Royal Air Force. In 1942 his airplane was shot down over Germany and he was captured. He remained a prisoner of war until the end of the conflict. His name was mentioned in dispatches for distinguished services.

== Post-World War II ==
Following the war, he studied law at King's College London and earned an LLB degree in 1948. He was called to the bar through Gray's Inn in 1949, and went on to practice law in Cyprus.

== Cypriot independence ==
During the 1955-59 Cypriot War of Independence, he served in EOKA under the pseudonym 'Hyperides' and defended many of the organization's fighters who had been arrested by the British authorities. One of his most important accomplishments during that time was the composition of a dossier that enumerated and provided evidence on cases of human rights violations by the British, which the Greek government presented to the Council of Europe's Human Rights Committee.

Clerides participated in the 1959 London Conference on Cyprus and during the transitional period from colonial administration to independence (1959–1960), he served as Minister of Justice. During the same period he was head of the Greek Cypriot delegation in the Joint Constitutional Committee.

== Post-independence ==
In July 1960, he was elected to the House of Representatives which, in turn, elected him as its first speaker. He held this position until 22 July 1976. In the first presidential election Clerides backed Makarios III, the other candidate being his father Ioannis Clerides.

Following the 1974 coup d'état in which EOKA B, a Greek Cypriot unionist paramilitary organization, overthrew the democratically elected president Makarios and installed Nikos Sampson, Turkey invaded Cyprus. Three days later, Sampson was forced to resign. On the same day, 23 July 1974, Clerides temporarily assumed the duties of the President of the Republic, in accordance with the relevant provisions of the Constitution. He exercised these duties until 7 December 1974, the day of the return of Makarios, who was forced to flee on 16 July 1974 on account of the coup. Both Makarios and the House of Representatives thanked Clerides publicly for the task he performed during that period. Critics, especially from EDEK refer to that period as the post-coup, implying that democracy was not fully restored until the return of Makarios. Clerides on the other hand had repeatedly condemned what he called "violence and counter violence" that led to the coup (i.e. the conflict between EOKA-B and "Efedriko", a special paramilitary police body formed to fight EOKA-B).

In 1976 he founded the Democratic Rally (DISY). He was a candidate for the presidency of Cyprus five times between 1983 and 2003 and elected to two five-year terms, in 1993 and in 1998.

Clerides was the author of an autobiographical over-toned depiction of 20th century Cypriot history, My Deposition, in four volumes (Alithia Publishing, Cyprus, 1988).

== Presidency ==
Clerides was elected president of the Republic of Cyprus in 1993 and was re-elected in 1998.

His government played a crucial role in Cyprus' accession to the European Union, with negotiations starting in 1998 and successfully concluding in 2002. It is noteworthy that Clerides achieved Cyprus' accession to the European Union without a prerequisite of a solution to the Cyprus problem.

Under his leadership, Cyprus boasted a stable economy that made it the wealthiest of the ten countries that joined the European Union in 2004.

Clerides' presidency was also marked by efforts to strengthen the defensive capabilities of the Cypriot National Guard. In November 1993, the "Defense Doctrine of the Single Area" was declared by Greece and Cyprus, with its main characteristic being its defensive nature and the goal of preventing or dealing with any aggressive action against either party. With the declaration of the doctrine, Greece's commitment to considering any Turkish attempt to advance in free Cyprus as a cause of war was emphasized.

His administration's purchase of S-300 air-defense missiles in 1997 resulted in a rapidly escalating political standoff between Cyprus and Turkey. Under heavy international pressure, Clerides decided to transfer the S-300s to the Hellenic Air Force in exchange for alternative weapons from Greece.

He was defeated in the 2003 presidential election by Tassos Papadopoulos, after a campaign with heavy emphasis on the Annan Plan.

== Honors and awards ==
From 1959 to 1960 Clerides held the position of President of the Cyprus Red Cross. In recognition of his outstanding services he was awarded a Certificate of Honor and Life Membership. He was also named an Honorary Member of the International Raoul Wallenberg Foundation.

Posthumously, the Republic of Cyprus gave his name to Larnaca International Airport.

=== Honors received from foreign countries ===
- Holy See: Knight of the Collar of the Order of the Holy Sepulchre
- Malta: Companion of Honour with Collar of the National Order of Merit (5 September 2002)
- Russia: Jubilee Medal "60 Years of Victory in the Great Patriotic War 1941–1945" (9 May 2005)
- Greece: Grand Cross of the Order of the Redeemer

== Bibliography ==
- Niyazi Kızılyürek, Glafkos Clerides: The Path of a Country, Rimal Publications, Nicosia, 2008, 278 p. ISBN 9789963610341

Political offices
Preceded by Nikos Sampson	Acting President of Cyprus; July 1974 – December 1974	Succeeded by Archbishop Makarios III
Preceded by George Vasiliou	President of Cyprus; 1993–2003	Succeeded by Tassos Papadopoulos
