= 1991 in Cyprus =

- Decades: 1970s; 1980s; 1990s; 2000s; 2010s
- See also: Other events in 1991 · Timeline of Cypriot history

This is a list of events in the year 1991 in Cyprus.

== Incumbents ==
- President: George Vassiliou
- President of the Parliament:
  - Vassos Lyssarides (until 30 May)
  - Alexis Galanos (starting 30 May)

== Events ==
Ongoing – Cyprus dispute

- 19 May – Democratic Rally won 20 of the 56 seats in the parliament following parliamentary elections. Voter turnout was 93%.
