= 1985 in Cyprus =

- Decades: 1960s; 1970s; 1980s; 1990s; 2000s
- See also: Other events in 1985 · Timeline of Cypriot history

Events in the year 1985 in Cyprus.

== Incumbents ==
- President: Spyros Kyprianou
- President of the Parliament: Georgios Ladas (until 30 December); Vassos Lyssarides (starting 30 December)

== Events ==
Ongoing – Cyprus dispute

- 8 December – Democratic Rally won 19 of the 56 seats in the parliament following parliamentary elections. Voter turnout was 94.6%.
