= 1996 in Cyprus =

- Decades: 1970s; 1980s; 1990s; 2000s; 2010s
- See also: Other events in 1996 · Timeline of Cypriot history

Events in the year 1996 in Cyprus.

== Incumbents ==
- President: Glafcos Clerides
- President of the Parliament: Alexis Galanos (until 7 June); Spyros Kyprianou (starting 7 June)

== Events ==
Ongoing – Cyprus dispute

- 26 May – Democratic Rally won 20 of the 56 seats in the parliament following parliamentary elections. Voter turnout was 92.9%.
