= 1982 in Cyprus =

- Decades: 1960s; 1970s; 1980s; 1990s; 2000s
- See also: Other events in 1982 · Timeline of Cypriot history

Events in the year 1982 in Cyprus.

== Incumbents ==
- President: Spyros Kyprianou
- President of the Parliament: Georgios Ladas

== Events ==
Ongoing – Cyprus dispute

- 15 June – U.N. Security Council resolution 510 was adopted unanimously and noted that, due to the existing circumstances, the presence of the United Nations Peacekeeping Force in Cyprus (UNFICYP) would continue to be essential for a peaceful settlement.
