= 1990 in Cyprus =

- Decades: 1970s; 1980s; 1990s; 2000s; 2010s
- See also: Other events in 1990 · Timeline of Cypriot history

Events in the year 1990 in Cyprus.

== Incumbents ==
- President: George Vassiliou
- President of the Parliament: Vassos Lyssarides

== Events ==
Ongoing – Cyprus dispute

- The first Cypriot National Badminton Championships were held.
- The Cyprus Institute of Neurology and Genetics began operating.
