= Second Hundred Years' War =

Periodization coined by John Robert Seeley

- Part of the Anglo-French Wars
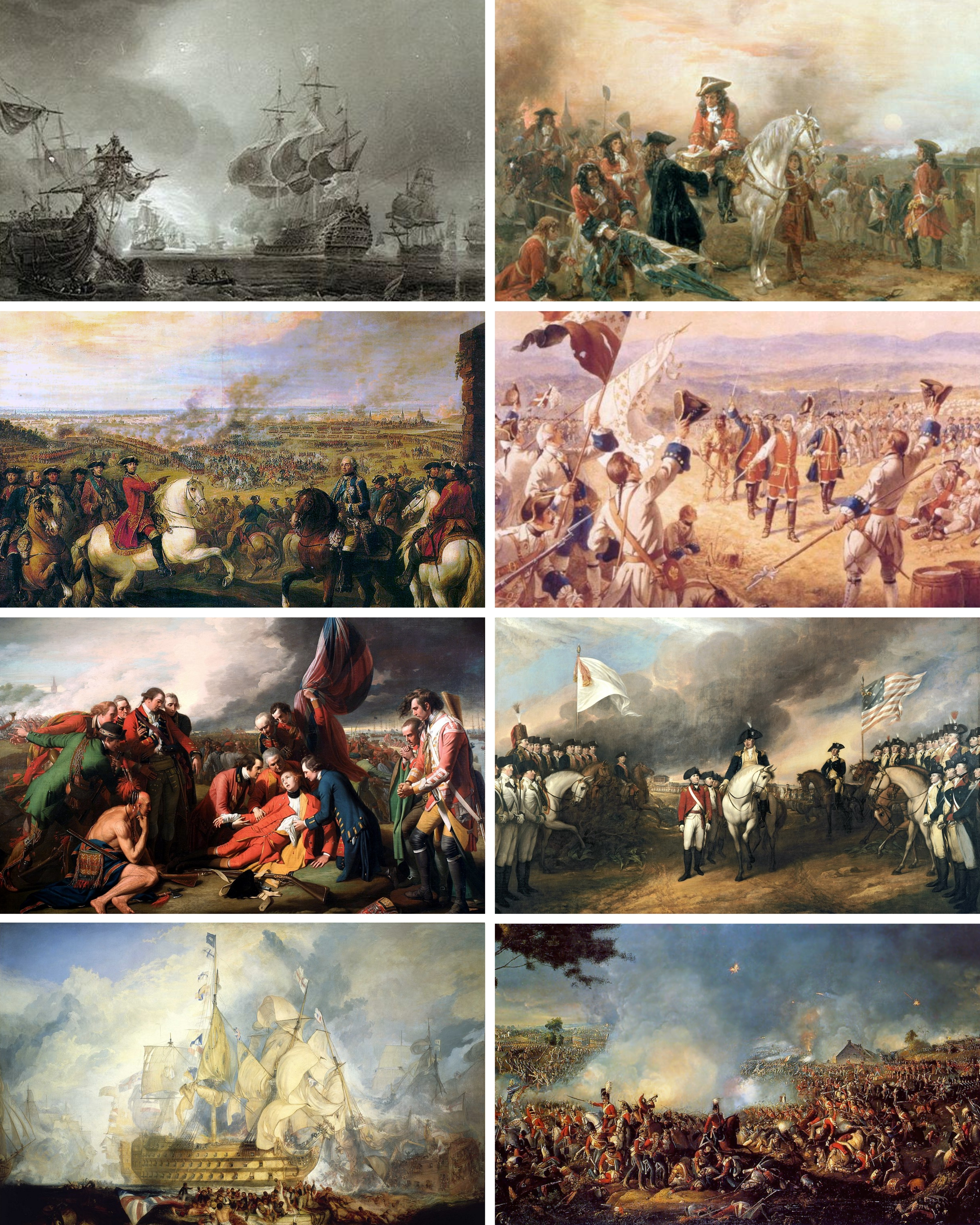
- Left to right, top to bottom: Battle of Beachy Head (10 July 1690); Battle of Blenheim (13 August 1704); Battle of Fontenoy (11 May 1745); Battle of Carillon (8 July 1758); Battle of the Plains of Abraham (13 September 1759); Siege of Yorktown (19 October 1781); Battle of Trafalgar (21 October 1805); Battle of Waterloo (18 June 1815)
Date	18 May 1689 – 20 November 1815 (126 years, 6 months and 2 days)
Location	Europe, Atlantic, Africa, the Americas, Indian subcontinent & ocean
Result	British victory
Territorial changes	Britain annexes Canada, French India, Malta, Ionian islands, St Vincent, Dominica, St. Lucia, Tobago, Mauritius and Seychelles from France

Belligerents
England (until 1707); Great Britain (until 1801); United Kingdom	Kingdom of France (until 1792); French First Republic (until 1804); First French Empire

Commanders and leaders
William III; Mary II; Anne; George I; George II; George III; George, Prince Regent	Louis XIV; Louis XV; Louis XVI; Napoleon I

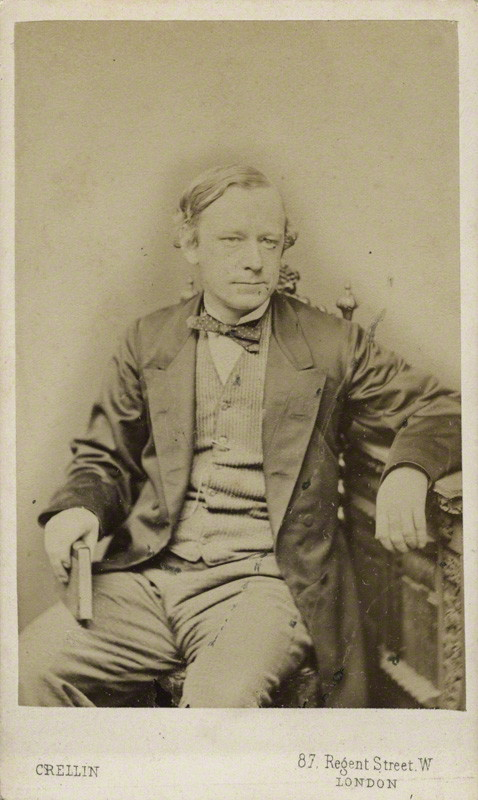
John Robert Seeley, who coined the concept

The Second Hundred Years' War is a periodization coined by the English historian John Robert Seeley in his work The Expansion of England (1883). Seeley used the periodization to describe the series of wars fought between England (and from 1707 onwards, Great Britain) and France that occurred between 1688 and 1815 as one continuous conflict for global dominance. These conflicts include the Nine Years' War, War of the Spanish Succession, War of the Austrian Succession, Seven Years' War, American Revolutionary War and French Revolutionary and Napoleonic Wars. The concept of a "Second Hundred Years' War" has not been widely accepted in academia and has been challenged by several historians, who question whether it accurately reflects the complex and distinct Anglo-French conflicts during that period. The Second Hundred Years' War is named after the Hundred Years' War, which occurred in the 14th and 15th centuries.

== Background ==
Like the Hundred Years' War, this term does not describe a single military event but a persistent general state of war between the two primary belligerents. The use of the phrase as an overarching category indicates the interrelation of all the wars as components of the rivalry between France and Britain for world power. It was a war between and over the future of each state's colonial empires.

The two countries remained continual antagonists even as their national identities underwent significant evolution. Great Britain was not a single state until 1707, prior to which it was the separate kingdoms of England and Scotland, albeit with a shared Crown and military establishment. In 1801, Britain was united with the Kingdom of Ireland to form the United Kingdom. The period also saw France under the Bourbon dynasty, the regimes of the French Revolution and the First Empire.

The various wars between the two states during the 18th century usually involved other European countries in large alliances; except for the War of the Quadruple Alliance when they were bound by the Anglo-French Alliance, France and Britain always opposed one another. Some of the wars, such as the Seven Years' War, have been considered world wars and included battles in the growing colonies in India, the Americas, and ocean shipping routes around the globe.

== Wars ==
=== Beginning: 1688–1714 ===
The series of wars began with the accession of the Dutch William III as King of England in the Revolution of 1688. The Stuarts had sought friendly terms with Louis XIV: James I and Charles I, both Protestants, had avoided involvement as much as possible in the Thirty Years' War, while Charles II and the Catholic convert James II had even actively supported Louis XIV in his War against the Dutch Republic. William III, however, sought to oppose Louis XIV's Catholic regime and styled himself as a Protestant champion. Tensions continued in the following decades, during which France protected and supported Jacobites who sought to overthrow the later Stuarts and, after 1715, the Hanoverians. The principal Anglo-French conflicts in this time period were the Nine Years' War and the War of Spanish Succession. The war of Spanish Succession saw Britain begin its ascendancy as a commercial and naval power, but after the Peace of Utrecht, the two formed an Anglo-French alliance, their interests converging as they wished to prevent the rise of Spanish or Russian power. The alliance soon fell apart, and the two countries soon became bitter rivals once again.

=== Colonies: 1744–1783 ===
After William III, the rivalry between the two countries shifted from being primarily about religion to being primarily about trade, colonies, and maintaining a balance of power. The primary conflicts in this time period between Britain and France were, in order: The War of the Austrian Succession, The Carnatic Wars, The Seven Years' War, and the American Revolutionary War. By the end of the Seven Years war, Britain decisively overtook France as Europe's greatest power, destroying French colonial power in India and North America. Yet France took advantage of American Revolutionary War to undermine British colonial hegemony in North America by supporting the rebellious colonists with both men and material, but debts from that conflict in turn sowed the economic seeds of France's own revolution shortly thereafter.

=== Revolution and Empire: 1792–1815 ===
The outbreak of the French Revolutionary Wars led to a renewed period of conflict between Britain and France, the latter now under the control of a republican government. The British led a pan-European coalition which opposed the French in the wars of the first, second, third, fourth, fifth and sixth coalitions. Despite Britain's allies in the Coalition suffering repeated defeats at French hands, British naval successes against the French, which deprived France of large parts of the French colonial empire, helped ensure the continued existence of further coalitions during the Napoleonic Wars. The final defeat of Napoleon in the Battle of Waterloo led to his abdication and exile, and effectively ended the recurrent conflict between France and Britain, with Britain decisively affirming its naval, imperial, and colonial supremacy over France for the foreseeable future. The British goal of restoring the French monarchy was confirmed by the Treaty of Paris and the subsequent Congress of Vienna.

== Aftermath ==
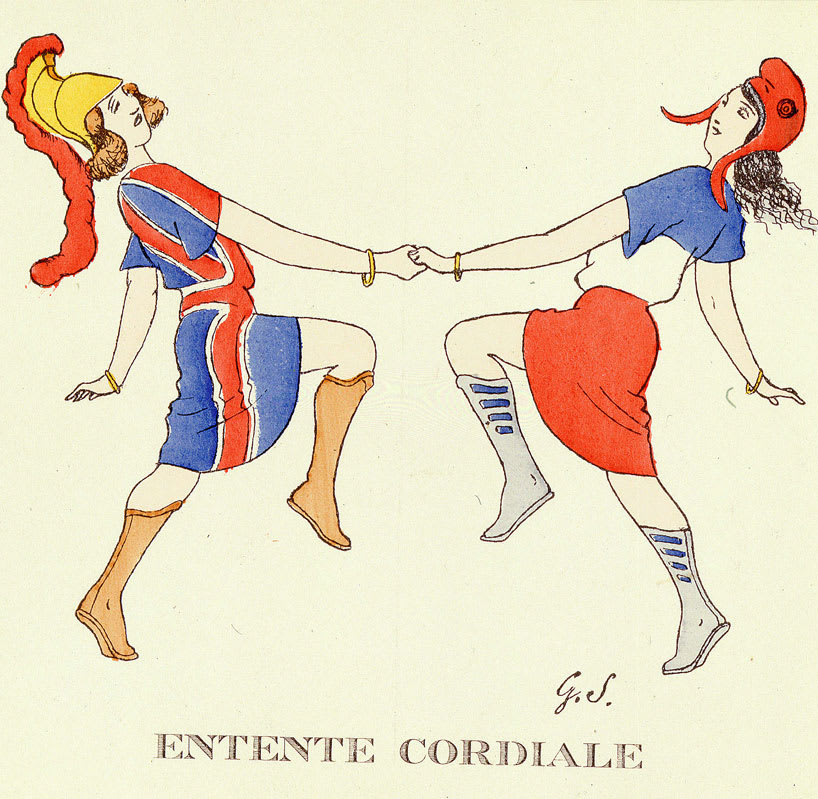
A French postcard made in 1904, showing Britannia and Marianne dancing together, symbolizing the Entente Cordiale

After the end of the French Revolutionary and Napoleonic Wars, direct conflict between France and Britain came to an end, as both countries focused on expanding their colonial empires and consolidating influence in their respective spheres of influence. The two nations fought on the same side in the Greek War of Independence and the Crimean War, reflecting an increasing level of alignment in British and French foreign policies concerning Europe. During the fin de siècle period, rising levels of fear over the growing power of the German Empire (which was established in 1871 as a result of the Franco-Prussian War) led to the Entente Cordiale, a rapprochement in Anglo-French relations marked by a series of agreements signed on 8 April 1904. It marked the definitive end of almost a thousand years of intermittent conflict, including resolutions to colonial disputes between the two nations. The Entente replaced the modus vivendi that had existed since the end of the Napoleonic Wars in 1815 with a more formal agreement.

== Wars included in the extended conflict ==
- Nine Years' War (1688–1697)
  - Williamite War (1688–1691)
  - King William's War (1689–1697)
- War of the Spanish Succession (1701–1714)
  - Queen Anne's War (1702–1713)
- War of the Austrian Succession (1742–1748)
  - King George's War (1744–1748)
  - 1st Carnatic War (1744–1748)
  - Jacobite rising of 1745 (1745–1746)
- Father Le Loutre's War (1749–1755)
- 2nd Carnatic War (1749–1754)
- Seven Years' War (1756–1763)
  - French and Indian War (1754–1763)
  - 3rd Carnatic War (1757–1763)
- Anglo-French War (1778–1783)
  - American Revolutionary War (1775–1783)
- French Revolutionary Wars (1792–1802)
  - War of the First Coalition (1792–1797)
  - Haitian Revolution (1793–1804)
  - War of the Second Coalition (1798–1802)
  - Irish Rebellion of 1798 (1798)
- Napoleonic Wars (1803–1815)
  - War of the Third Coalition (1803–1806)
  - War of the Fourth Coalition (1806–1807)
  - Peninsular War (1808–1814)
  - War of the Fifth Coalition (1809)
  - War of the Sixth Coalition (1812–1814)
  - Hundred Days (1815)

== Important figures ==
England, Great Britain
Ruler	Reign
Queen Mary II	1689–1694
King William III	1689–1702
Queen Anne	1702–1714
King George I	1714–1727
King George II	1727–1760
King George III	1760–1820

France
Ruler	Reign
King Louis XIV	1643–1715
King Louis XV	1715–1774
King Louis XVI	1774–1792
National Convention	1792–1795
Directory	1795–1799
First Consul Bonaparte→Emperor Napoleon I	1799–1814; 1815
King Louis XVIII	1814–1815; 1815–1824

== See also ==
- Carnatic Wars
- European colonization of the Americas
- French–German enmity
- French–Habsburg rivalry
- France–United Kingdom relations
- French and Indian Wars
- Long eighteenth century
