= 1993 in Cyprus =

- Decades: 1970s; 1980s; 1990s; 2000s; 2010s
- See also: Other events in 1993 · Timeline of Cypriot history

Events in the year 1993 in Cyprus.

== Incumbents ==
- President: George Vassiliou (until 28 February); Glafcos Clerides (starting 28 February)
- President of the Parliament: Alexis Galanos

== Events ==
Ongoing – Cyprus dispute

- 7 & 14 February – Glafcos Clerides of the Democratic Rally defeated George Vassiliou of the AKEL in presidential elections to become the next president. Voter turnout was 92.4% in the first round and 93.3% in the second round.
