= 1994 in Cyprus =

- Decades: 1970s; 1980s; 1990s; 2000s; 2010s
- See also: Other events in 1994 · Timeline of Cypriot history

Events in the year 1994 in Cyprus.

January 3 - The Green Line, which had divided Cyprus since 1974, was opened for the first time in nearly 20 years, allowing limited movement between the north and south of the island.

March 22 - The United Nations Security Council passed Resolution 904, which established the United Nations Peacekeeping Force in Cyprus (UNFICYP) to monitor the ceasefire line and help maintain peace and stability on the island.

May 29 - The European Union lifted an embargo on trade with the Turkish-occupied north of Cyprus, which had been in place since 1987.

August 15 - Archbishop Chrysostomos II was elected as the new head of the autocephalous Church of Cyprus, succeeding Archbishop Chrysostomos I.

September 5 - A massive explosion rocked a munitions depot near the village of Dali, causing widespread damage and injuring several people.

October 1 - Cyprus became a full member of the Council of Europe, an international organization dedicated to upholding human rights, democracy, and the rule of law.

November 3 - The Cypriot government launched a major crackdown on illegal immigration, leading to the arrest and deportation of hundreds of undocumented migrants.

December 11 - The first-ever direct talks between the leaders of the Greek and Turkish Cypriot communities, President Glafcos Clerides and Rauf Denktaş, took place in Nicosia, under the auspices of the United Nations. The talks aimed to find a peaceful solution to the Cyprus problem and reunify the island.

== Incumbents ==
- President: Glafcos Clerides; He was a prominent Cypriot politician who served as the fourth President of the Republic of Cyprus from 1993 to 2003. He was born on April 24, 1919, in Nicosia, Cyprus, and died on November 15, 2013, in Nicosia. He was an influential figure in Cypriot politics for several decades. He was first elected to the Cypriot House of Representatives in 1960 and served as the Speaker of the House from 1976 to 1981. In 1974, he was appointed as the Minister of Foreign Affairs and played a crucial role in the negotiations to resolve the Cyprus dispute following the Turkish invasion of the island. In 1993, Clerides was elected as President of the Republic of Cyprus, defeating incumbent President George Vassiliou in the elections. He was re-elected for a second term in 1998. During his presidency, Clerides played a significant role in the efforts to resolve the Cyprus issue and reunify the island. He was also instrumental in securing Cyprus' accession to the European Union in 2004. He was known for his statesmanship, integrity, and commitment to democracy. He was widely respected both in Cyprus and internationally for his efforts to promote peace and stability in the Eastern Mediterranean region.
- President of the Parliament: Alexis Galanos; He was a Cypriot politician who previously served as the President of the Parliament of Cyprus. He was born on October 6, 1950, in Larnaca, Cyprus. Galanos was a member of the Democratic Rally party and was elected to the Cypriot House of Representatives in 2001, representing the Larnaca district. He served as the President of the Parliament from 2011 to 2016. Prior to his political career, Galanos worked as a lawyer.

== Events ==
Ongoing – Cyprus dispute

- 12 – 27 February – Cyprus sent a delegation to compete at the 1994 Winter Olympics in Lillehammer, Norway.
