= 1983 in Cyprus =

- Decades: 1960s; 1970s; 1980s; 1990s; 2000s
- See also: Other events in 1983 · Timeline of Cypriot history

Events in the year 1983 in Cyprus.

== Incumbents ==
- President: Spyros Kyprianou
- President of the Parliament: Georgios Ladas

== Events ==
Ongoing – Cyprus dispute

- 13 February – Spyros Kyprianou of the Democratic Party (and also supported by AKEL) won presidential elections, receiving 56.5% of the vote. Voter turnout was 95.0%.
