= 1986 in Cyprus =

- Decades: 1960s; 1970s; 1980s; 1990s; 2000s
- See also: Other events in 1986 · Timeline of Cypriot history

Events in the year 1986 in Cyprus.

== Incumbents ==
- President: Spyros Kyprianou
- President of the Parliament: Vassos Lyssarides

== Events ==
Ongoing – Cyprus dispute

- 13 June – U.N. Security Council resolution 585 was adopted unanimously and noted that, due to the existing circumstances, the presence of the United Nations Peacekeeping Force in Cyprus (UNFICYP) would continue to be essential for a peaceful settlement.
