= 1988 in Cyprus =

- Decades: 1960s; 1970s; 1980s; 1990s; 2000s
- See also: Other events in 1988 · Timeline of Cypriot history

Events in the year 1988 in Cyprus.

== Incumbents ==
- President: Spyros Kyprianou (until 28 February); George Vassiliou (starting 28 February)
- President of the Parliament: Vassos Lyssarides

== Events ==
Ongoing – Cyprus dispute

- 14 February – George Vassiliou, an independent candidate supported by AKEL, defeated Glafcos Clerides of the Democratic Rally in presidential elections. They were the first presidential elections in the country's history to go to a second round. Voter turnout was 94.3% in both rounds.
- September – 1988 Non-Aligned Foreign Ministers Conference was held in Nicosia.
