= 1962 in Cyprus =

- Decades: 1940s; 1950s; 1960s; 1970s; 1980s
- See also: Other events in 1962 · Timeline of Cypriot history

Events in the year 1962 in Cyprus.

== Incumbents ==
- President: Makarios III
- President of the Parliament: Glafcos Clerides

== Events ==
- ETHA Engomis FC, a Cypriot football club based in Engomi, Nicosia, was founded.
