= 1984 in Cyprus =

- Decades: 1960s; 1970s; 1980s; 1990s; 2000s
- See also: Other events in 1984 · Timeline of Cypriot history

Events in the year 1984 in Cyprus.

== Incumbents ==
- President: Spyros Kyprianou
- President of the Parliament: Georgios Ladas

== Events ==
Ongoing – Cyprus dispute

- 14 December – U.N. Security Council resolution 559 was adopted unanimously.

== Births ==
- 1 September - Geadis Geadi, member of the European parliament
