= 1992 in Cyprus =

- Decades: 1970s; 1980s; 1990s; 2000s; 2010s
- See also: Other events in 1992 · Timeline of Cypriot history

Events in the year 1992 in Cyprus.

== Incumbents ==
- President: George Vassiliou
- President of the Parliament: Alexis Galanos

== Events ==
Ongoing – Cyprus dispute

- 25 March – Eurocypria Airlines Limited, a charter airline owned by the government of Cyprus, was founded.
