= 1995 in Cyprus =

- Decades: 1970s; 1980s; 1990s; 2000s; 2010s
- See also: Other events in 1995 · Timeline of Cypriot history

Events in the year 1995 in Cyprus.

== Incumbents ==
- President: Glafcos Clerides
- President of the Parliament: Alexis Galanos

== Events ==
Ongoing – Cyprus dispute

- 14 March – Alexandros Panayi represented Cyprus in Eurovision with the song "Sti fotia". It finished 9th with 79 points.
- 6 – 11 November – The 1995 PSA Men's Detjen World Open Squash Championship took place in Nicosia. Jansher Khan won his seventh World Open title, defeating Del Harris in the final.
