= 1969 in Cyprus =

- Decades: 1940s; 1950s; 1960s; 1970s; 1980s
- See also: Other events in 1969 · Timeline of Cypriot history

Events in the year 1969 in Cyprus.

== Incumbents ==
- President: Makarios III
- President of the Parliament: Glafcos Clerides

== Events ==
- The Movement for Social Democracy was founded by Vasos Lyssaridis.
