= 1989 in Cyprus =

- Decades: 1960s; 1970s; 1980s; 1990s; 2000s
- See also: Other events in 1989 · Timeline of Cypriot history

Events in the year 1989 in Cyprus.

== Incumbents ==
- President: George Vassiliou
- President of the Parliament: Vassos Lyssarides

== Events ==
Ongoing – Cyprus dispute

- The University of Cyprus was established.
- Kormakitis FC, a Cypriot association football club based in Kormakitis, was founded.
