= 1981 in Cyprus =

- Decades: 1960s; 1970s; 1980s; 1990s; 2000s
- See also: Other events in 1981 · Timeline of Cypriot history

Events in the year 1981 in Cyprus.

== Incumbents ==
- President: Spyros Kyprianou
- President of the Parliament: Alekos Michaelides (until 4 June); Georgios Ladas (starting 4 June)

== Events ==
Ongoing – Cyprus dispute

- 24 May – AKEL and the Democratic Rally both won 12 of the 35 seats in the parliament in parliamentary elections. Voter turnout was 95.7%.
