= 1987 in Cyprus =

- Decades: 1960s; 1970s; 1980s; 1990s; 2000s
- See also: Other events in 1987 · Timeline of Cypriot history

Events in the year 1987 in Cyprus.

== Incumbents ==
- President: Spyros Kyprianou
- President of the Parliament: Vassos Lyssarides

== Events ==
Ongoing – Cyprus dispute

- The Cyprus International, an international open in badminton, held its first game.
- The Heritage Private School was founded.
