= 1965 in Cyprus =

- Decades: 1940s; 1950s; 1960s; 1970s; 1980s
- See also: Other events in 1965 · Timeline of Cypriot history

Events in the year 1965 in Cyprus.

== Incumbents ==
- President: Makarios III
- President of the Parliament: Glafcos Clerides

== Events ==
- 19 March – U.N. Security Council Resolution 201 was adopted unanimously. In it, the Council extended the stationing of the United Nations Peacekeeping Force in Cyprus for another 3 months, to end on June 26, 1965.
