= 1961 in Cyprus =

- Decades: 1940s; 1950s; 1960s; 1970s; 1980s
- See also: Other events in 1961 · Timeline of Cypriot history

Events in the year 1961 in Cyprus.

== Incumbents ==
- President: Makarios III
- President of the Parliament: Glafcos Clerides

== Events ==
March - Cyprus became a republic in the Commonwealth of Nations at the 1961 Commonwealth Prime Ministers' Conference, and President Makarios III became a Commonwealth Head of State & a Commonwealth Head of Government as a result.

- The Cypriot Chess Championship joined FIDE.
