= 1978 in Cyprus =

- Decades: 1950s; 1960s; 1970s; 1980s; 1990s
- See also: Other events in 1978 · Timeline of Cypriot history

Events in the year 1978 in Cyprus.

== Incumbents ==
- President: Spyros Kyprianou
- President of the Parliament: Alekos Michaelides

== Events ==
Ongoing – Cyprus dispute

- 16 June – U.N. Security Council Resolution 430 was adopted and noted that, due to the existing circumstances, the presence of the United Nations Peacekeeping Force in Cyprus would continue to be essential for a peaceful settlement.
