= 1968 in Cyprus =

- Decades: 1940s; 1950s; 1960s; 1970s; 1980s
- See also: Other events in 1968 · Timeline of Cypriot history

The following events occurred in Cyprus in the year 1968.

== Incumbents ==
- President: Makarios III
- President of the Parliament: Glafcos Clerides

== Events ==
- 25 February – Incumbent President Makarios III won the presidential elections with 96.3% of the vote. Voter turnout was 93.5%.
