= 1977 in Cyprus =

- Decades: 1950s; 1960s; 1970s; 1980s; 1990s
- See also: Other events in 1977 · Timeline of Cypriot history

Events in the year 1977 in Cyprus.

== Incumbents ==
- President: Makarios III (until 3 August); Spyros Kyprianou (starting 3 August)
- President of the Parliament: Spyros Kyprianou (until 20 September); Alekos Michaelides (starting 20 September)

== Events ==
Ongoing – Cyprus dispute

- 15 June – U.N. Security Council Resolution 410 was adopted and noted that, due to the existing circumstances, the presence of the United Nations Peacekeeping Force in Cyprus would continue to be essential for a peaceful settlement.
