= 1960 in Cyprus =

- Decades: 1940s; 1950s; 1960s; 1970s; 1980s
- See also: Other events in 1960 · Timeline of Cypriot history

Events in the year 1960 in Cyprus.

== Incumbents ==
- Governor of Cyprus: Sir Hugh Foot (until 16 August)
- Chief Justice of Cyprus: Sir Paget John Bourke (until 16 August)
- President: Makarios III (from 16 August)
- President of the Parliament of Cyprus: Glafcos Clerides (from 16 August)

== Events ==
- 31 July – The House of Representatives was elected, with a victory for the Patriotic Front, which gained 30 seats. Of the 50 seats, Greek Cypriots won 35 and Turkish Cypriots won 15.
- 7 August – The Communal Chambers were elected, with the Patriotic Front winning the majority of seats in the Greek Chamber, whilst the Cyprus Turkish National Union won all seats in the Turkish Chamber.
- 16 August – The country gained independence from the United Kingdom, with Makarios III becoming the first President of the Republic of Cyprus.
