= 1970 in Cyprus =

- Decades: 1950s; 1960s; 1970s; 1980s; 1990s
- See also: Other events in 1970 · Timeline of Cypriot history

Events in the year 1970 in Cyprus.

== Incumbents ==
- President: Makarios III
- President of the Parliament: Glafcos Clerides

== Events ==
- 5 July – Eniaion won 15 of the 35 seats in parliament following parliamentary elections. However, AKEL receiving a far larger share of the vote.
