= 1975 in Cyprus =

- Decades: 1950s; 1960s; 1970s; 1980s; 1990s
- See also: Other events in 1975 · Timeline of Cypriot history

Events in the year 1975 in Cyprus.

== Incumbents ==
- President: Makarios III
- President of the Parliament: Glafcos Clerides

== Events ==
Ongoing – Cyprus dispute

- 12 March – U.N. Security Council Resolution 367 was adopted after receiving a complaint from the government of the country, the Council again called upon all States to respect the sovereignty, independence, territorial integrity and non-alignment of the Republic of Cyprus.
