= 1976 in Cyprus =

- Decades: 1950s; 1960s; 1970s; 1980s; 1990s
- See also: Other events in 1976 · Timeline of Cypriot history

Events in the year 1976 in Cyprus.

== Incumbents ==
- President: Makarios III
- President of the Parliament: Glafkos Klerides (until 22 July); Tassos Papadopoulos (22 July–20 September); Spyros Kyprianou (starting 20 September)

== Events ==
Ongoing – Cyprus dispute

- 5 September – The Democratic Front won 21 of the 35 seats in the parliament following parliamentary elections. Voter turnout was 85.3%.
