= 1964 in Cyprus =

- Decades: 1940s; 1950s; 1960s; 1970s; 1980s
- See also: Other events in 1964 · Timeline of Cypriot history

Events in the year 1964 in Cyprus.

== Incumbents ==
- President: Makarios III
- President of the Parliament: Glafcos Clerides

== Events ==
- 4 March – U.N. Security Council Resolution 186 was adopted unanimously. It asked the Government of Cyprus to take all additional measures necessary to stop violence and bloodshed and called on communities in Cyprus and their leaders to act with restraint.
- 11 – 13 May – The Famagusta incident resulted in the deaths of Greek Cypriot officers and Turkish Cypriots.
