= 1973 in Cyprus =

- Decades: 1950s; 1960s; 1970s; 1980s; 1990s
- See also: Other events in 1973 · Timeline of Cypriot history

Events in the year 1973 in Cyprus.

== Incumbents ==
- President: Makarios III
- President of the Parliament: Glafcos Clerides

== Events ==
- 18 February – Presidential elections were scheduled to be held but, as incumbent President Makarios III was the only candidate, the elections were not held and Makarios III was automatically declared the winner. A separate election for the vice president also took place. Rauf Denktaş stood unopposed and was elected.
