= 1980 in Cyprus =

- Decades: 1960s; 1970s; 1980s; 1990s; 2000s
- See also: Other events in 1980 · Timeline of Cypriot history

Events in the year 1980 in Cyprus.

== Incumbents ==
- President: Spyros Kyprianou
- President of the Parliament: Alekos Michaelides

== Events ==
Ongoing – Cyprus dispute

- 13 June – U.N. Security Council Resolution 472 was adopted and noted that, due to the existing circumstances, the presence of the United Nations Peacekeeping Force in Cyprus (UNFICYP) would continue to be essential for a peaceful settlement.
