= 1974 in Cyprus =

- Decades: 1950s; 1960s; 1970s; 1980s; 1990s
- See also: Other events in 1974 · Timeline of Cypriot history

Events in the year 1974 in Cyprus.

== Incumbents ==
- President: Makarios III
- President of the Parliament: Glafcos Clerides

== Events ==
Ongoing – Cyprus dispute

- 20 July – The Turkish invasion of Cyprus was launched.
