= 1967 in Cyprus =

- Decades: 1940s; 1950s; 1960s; 1970s; 1980s
- See also: Other events in 1967 · Timeline of Cypriot history

Events in the year 1967 in Cyprus.

== Incumbents ==
- President: Makarios III
- President of the Parliament: Glafcos Clerides

== Events ==
- 20 April – A Bristol Britannia of the Swiss airline Globe Air flew into the ground 3.5 kilometres (2.2 mi) south of Nicosia Airport, killing all 126 passengers and crew on board.
- 15 November – The Cyprus crisis of 1967 broke out.

== Deaths ==
- 20 April – A Bristol Britannia of the Swiss airline Globe Air flew into the ground 3.5 kilometres (2.2 mi) south of Nicosia Airport, killing all 126 passengers and crew on board.
