= Doros Loizou =

Cypriot poet (1944–1974)

- Δώρος Λοΐζου
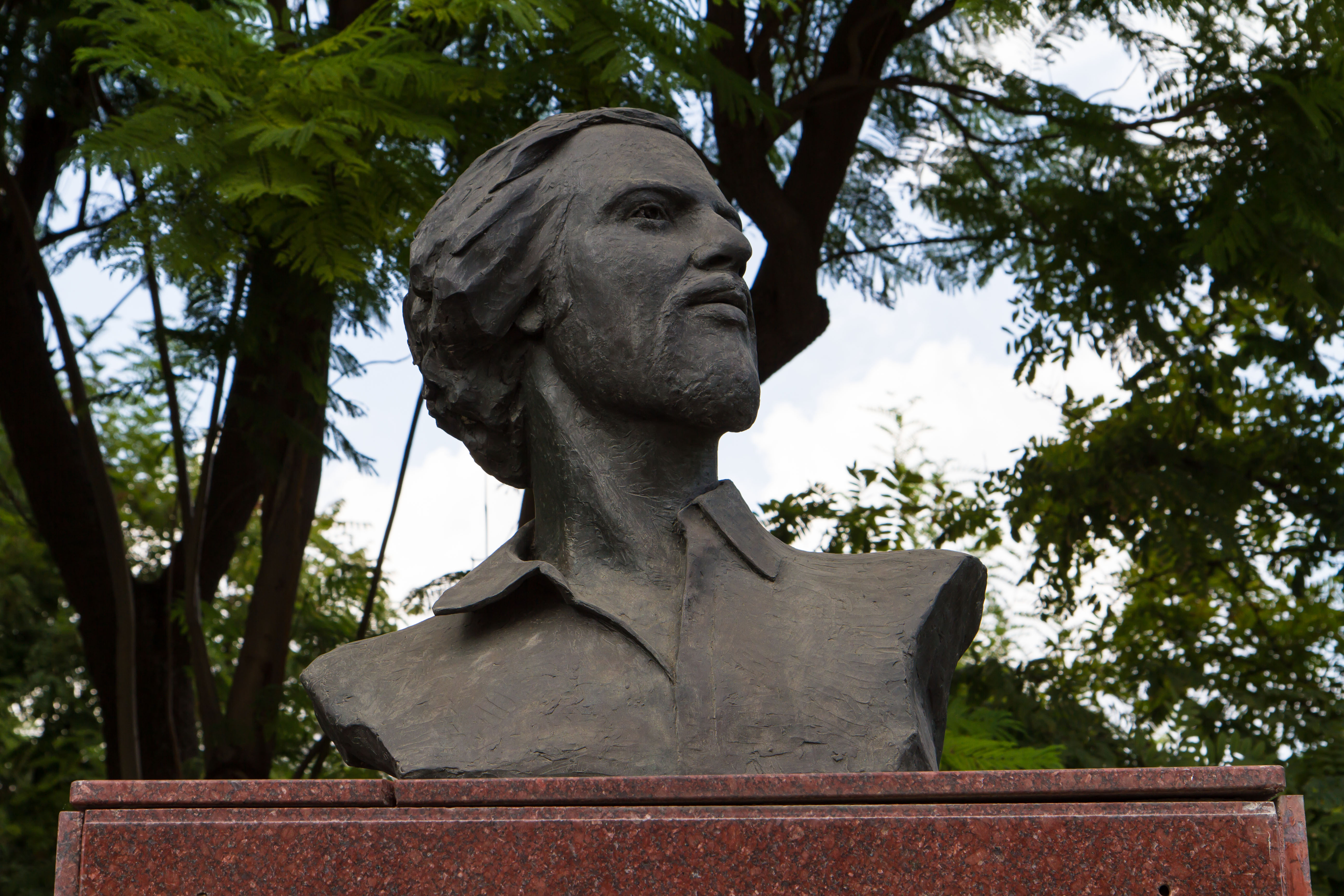
- Bust of Doros Louizou in Nicosia.
- Born: February 23, 1944; Nicosia, Cyprus
- Died: August 30, 1974 (aged 30)
- Cause of death: Attempted assassination of Vassos Lyssarides
- Political party: EDEK
- Spouse: Barbara Bell 1971

Doros Loizou (Δώρος Λοΐζου) (February 23, 1944—August 30, 1974) was a Cypriot poet and leader of the youth section of EDEK (the Movement for Social Democracy). He was killed in the attempted assassination of Vassos Lyssarides.

Mimi Sofokleous, a poet presented his book titled “The Poet Doros Loizou (1944-1974)” in Strovolos in honour of Doros and the book is published by Afī Editions.

== Life ==
Doros Loizou was the first child of Byron and Laura Loizou, born in Nicosia on February 23, 1944. In 1947, he attended the Hellenic Academy infant school. From 1949 to 1955, he was a student at Saint Anthony primary school. From 1956 to 1962, he attended the Pancyprian Gymnasium. While a student, he writes his first poems.

In the Struggle against British Rule from 1955 to 1959, he fought with Cypriots as part of the Students Movement of EOKA.

In 1963, Loizou studied at the Theatre School of T. Sakettas and C. Michaelides, and starred in two plays put on by the Public Theatre of Nicosia.

He volunteered to serve in the Cypriot National Guard.

In 1966, he went to Rhodes-Greece to study hotel management, and, in response to the 1967 Colonels' Coup, organized a 1968 strike among his fellow students to demand better living conditions and freedom of expression. He listened to forbidden Theodorakis. During a National Celebration, he covered a picture of the King with a Greek Flag. These activities led the Greek junta to expel him.

After his expulsion, Loizou returned to Cyprus, where he founded the Pancyprian Art and Literature Youth Club. He then left to go to New York City to continue studying hotel management, but stayed only until 1969, abandoning his study of hotel management, in favor of studying history at the Boston Hellenic College.

In 1971, he began to travel and give speeches on Greek civilization, specifically Greek poetry. He translated various poems from other languages.

The Boston Hellenic College elected him Student Body president. He wrote a letter to President Richard Nixon, demanding an end to the Vietnam War, which was read in Congress on May 6, 1971. He began to work as a journalist at a New York Greek-American paper, and at his college's student newspaper.

He met Barbara Bell, and they married in October 1971. He received a diploma in history with an honorable mention. After they moved to live in Cyprus, Loizou worked as a history and literature teacher at the English School in Nicosia. Seeking a way to continue his political activities, he was advised by his friends to join EDEK, where he served as Organizing Secretary of the youth sector. He managed the Socialist Expression paper. In 1973, he quit teaching to become a full-time politician.

After the 1974 Cypriot coup d'état, Loizou began organizing resistance groups, one in Kaimakli. He was arrested and questioned about the leader of EDEK, but revealed nothing and was released. He said to his wife on it: "I showed no fear, so they didn't harm me." He had to move to avoid capture or murder by fascist groups.

== Death ==
Loizou drove the car Vassos Lyssarides and Barbara Bell were riding in on August 30, 1974, and, after being shot at, immediately accelerated, saving the lives of the passengers. He himself died.

== Funeral ==
Lyssarides attended Loizou's funeral. He stated that President Glafcos Clerides had to disarm EOKA B, and that if he didn't, "the volcano will erupt for it will not be possible to hold the people back"; statements that were applauded by Loizou's widow, Barbara Bell. Hundreds of protestors supporting Makarios III attended Loizou's funeral procession, holding signs blaming EOKA B and the CIA for his death.

Loizou's father said: "Stop the bloodshed, we've had enough, we can't take any more. I hope Doros is the last to die."
