= French Revolutionary and Napoleonic Wars =

Series of European conflicts, 1792–1815

- Part of the Second Hundred Years' War and aftermath of the French Revolution
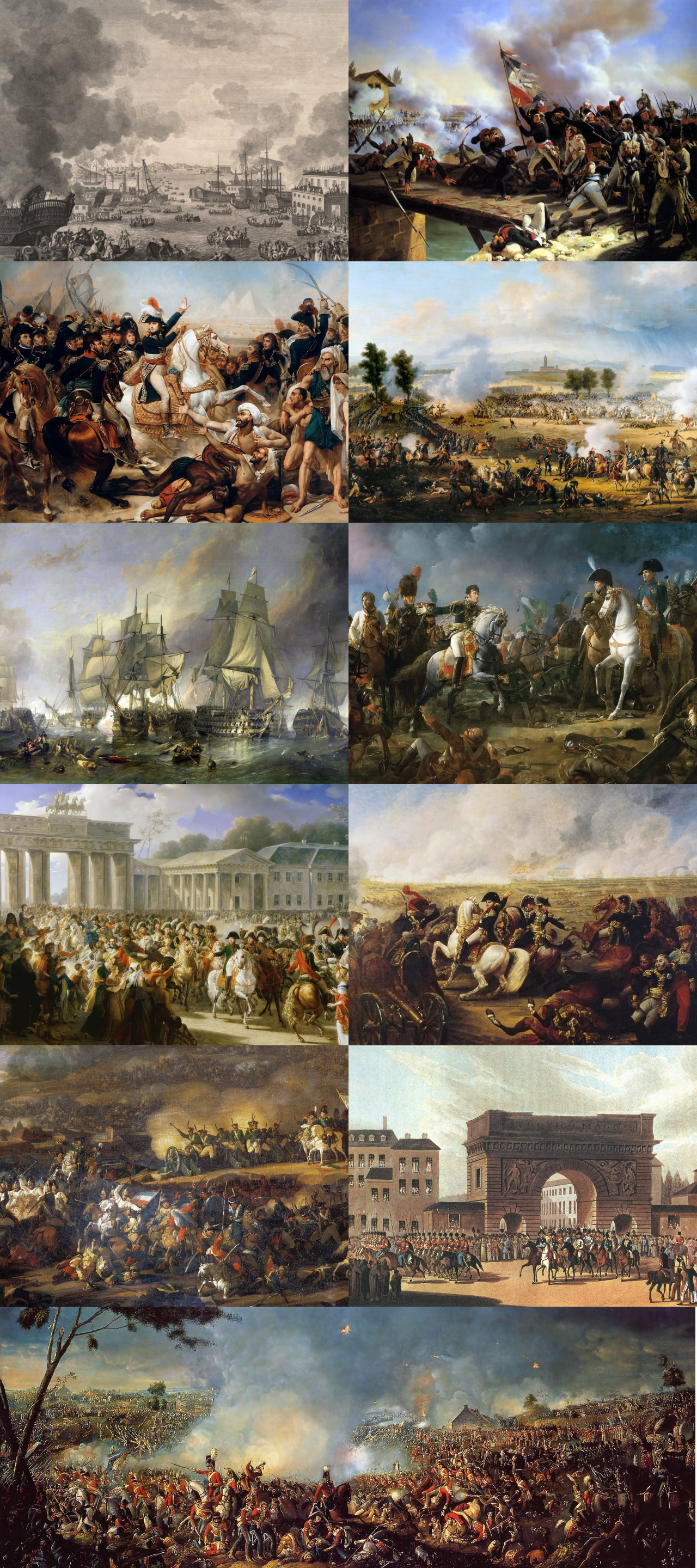
- Coalition wars Click an image to load the appropriate article. Left to right, top to bottom: battles of Toulon, Arcole, the Pyramids, Marengo, Trafalgar, Austerlitz, Berlin, Wagram, Leipzig, Paris, Waterloo
Date	20 April 1792 – 20 November 1815 (23 years and 7 months)
Location	Europe, overseas colonies of European states
Result	Coalition victory

Belligerents
French First Republic (before 1804); First French Empire (after 1804); French client states	Main European powers: Great Britain (Note: Kingdom of Great Britain (to 1801), UKGBI (from 1801)); Austrian Empire (from 1804); Kingdom of Prussia; Russian Empire

Casualties and losses
French: 1,000,000 dead, wounded, missing, captured, or deserted (1792–1801); 306,000 killed (1805–1815)	Austrian: 514,700 killed, wounded, or captured (1792–1797); 440,000 killed, wounded, or captured (1799–1801); 396,000 killed in action (1805–1815); Prussian: 154,000 killed in action (1805–1815); Russian: 299,000 killed in action (1805–1815)
- War of the Fourth Coalition 700,000 deaths War of the Fifth Coalition 300,000 deaths Peninsular War 2,400,000 deaths War of the Sixth Coalition 450,000 deaths War of the Seventh Coalition 60,000 deaths

Coalition Wars
Locations of battles in the Coalition Wars:
1 First Coalition: France 1792:...Toulon...
2 Second Coalition: Egypt 1798:...Pyramids...
3 Second Coalition: Italy 1799:...Marengo...
4 Third Coalition: Germany 1803:...Austerlitz...
5 Fourth Coalition: Prussia 1806:...Jena...
6 Fifth Coalition: Austria 1809:...Wagram...
7 Sixth Coalition: Germany 1813:...Leipzig...
8 Sixth Coalition: France 1814:...Paris...
9 Seventh Coalition: Belgium 1815:...Waterloo...

The French Revolutionary and Napoleonic Wars (sometimes called the Great French War or the Wars of the Revolution and the Empire) (Note: French: guerre révolutionnaires et napoléoniennes, grande guerre française, guerres de la Révolution et de l'Empire) were a series of conflicts between the French and several European monarchies between 1792 and 1815. They encompass first the French Revolutionary Wars against the newly declared French Republic and from 1803 onwards, the Napoleonic Wars against First Consul and later Emperor Napoleon Bonaparte. They include the Coalition Wars as a subset: seven wars waged by various military alliances of great European powers, known as Coalitions, against Revolutionary France – later the First French Empire – and its allies between 1792 and 1815:

- War of the First Coalition (April 1792 – October 1797)
- War of the Second Coalition (November 1798 – March 1802)
- War of the Third Coalition (April 1805 – July 1806)
- War of the Fourth Coalition (October 1806 – July 1807)
- War of the Fifth Coalition (April – October 1809)
- War of the Sixth Coalition (March 1813 – May 1814)
- War of the Seventh Coalition, also known as the Hundred Days (March – July 1815)

Although the Coalition Wars are the most prominent subset of conflicts of this era, some French Revolutionary Wars such as the French invasion of Switzerland, and some Napoleonic Wars such as the French invasion of Russia and the Peninsular War, are not counted amongst the "Coalition Wars" proper.

== Terminology ==
=== Etymology of Coalition Wars ===
One of the first usages of the term "Coalition Wars" can be found in the 1803 Tribunat report, titled Résultats des guerres, des négociations et des traités qui ont préced́é et suivi la coalition contre la France ("Results of the Wars, Negotiations and Treaties that preceded and followed the Coalition against France"). About the situation in April 1793, when General Dumouriez had just been defeated at Neerwinden and defected to Austria, causing despair in France, it states: "Les événements de cette époque sont les plus pénibles à décrire de tous ceux qui ont signalé les guerres de la coalition." ("The events of that time are the most painful to describe of all those that marked the wars of the coalition." [emphasis added]).

In January 1805, the Salzburger Intelligenzblatt was one of the first to number the Coalition Wars when it discussed "Das Staatsinteresse von Baiern bei dem dritten Koalitions-Kriege" ("The national interest of Bavaria in the Third Coalition War"). Although the Third Coalition had been formed by that time, war had not yet broken out; (Note: Great Britain had already declared war on France in 1803, but it had been fighting France on its own while forming the Third Coalition, whose other members (Austria, Russia, Sweden, Naples and Sicily) would not join the war against France until September 1805.) the Austrian newspaper discussed why the neighbouring Electorate of Bavaria was likely to side with the French Empire rather than the Austrian-led Coalition. On 30 September 1805, a few days after the launch of the Ulm campaign, Emperor Napoleon addressed his troops in Strasbourg, starting his speech with the words: "Soldats, la guerre de la troisième coalition est commencée." ("Soldiers, the war of the third coalition has begun.")

=== Compared to other terms ===
The term is distinct from "French Revolutionary Wars", which covers any war involving Revolutionary France between 1792 and 1799, when Napoleon seized power with the Coup of 18 Brumaire (9 November 1799), which is usually considered the end of the French Revolution. Since the War of the Second Coalition (1798–1802) had already begun when Napoleon seized power, the war as a whole may or may not be counted amongst the French Revolutionary Wars, which therefore may end in 1799, 1801 (Treaty of Lunéville), or 1802 (Treaty of Amiens).

It also differs from "Napoleonic Wars", which is variously defined as covering any war involving France ruled by Napoleon between 1799 and 1815 (which includes the War of the Second Coalition, 1798–1802), or not commencing until the War of the Third Coalition (1803/05, depending on periodisation). In the latter case, historians do not term the War of the Second Coalition "Napoleonic", since Napoleon did not initiate it himself, but merely "inherited" it from the Revolutionary French Directory which he overthrew during the war.

Because it only pertains to wars involving any of the Coalition parties, not all wars counted amongst the French Revolutionary and Napoleonic Wars are considered "Coalition Wars". For example, the French invasion of Switzerland (1798, between the First and Second Coalition), the Stecklikrieg (1802, between the Second and Third Coalition), the Peninsular War (1807–1814) and the French invasion of Russia (1812, between the Fifth and Sixth Coalition) were not assigned to the "Coalition Wars".

The term "Great French War" arose from British historiography, which occasionally used it to refer to the nearly continuous period of warfare from 1792 to 1815, or as the final phase of the Anglo-French Second Hundred Years' War, spanning the period 1689 to 1815. Historian Mike Rapport (2013) suggested using the term "French Wars" to unambiguously describe the entire period from 1792 to 1815.

- Phase
- French victory
- Anti-French victory
- Indecisive/compromise
- Coalition

== Coalition parties ==
The main European powers who forged the various anti-French Coalitions were Great Britain, Russia, Austria, and Prussia, although except for Great Britain not all of them were involved in every Coalition. Smaller powers that occasionally joined the Coalitions include Spain, Naples, Piedmont–Sardinia, the Dutch Republic, the Ottoman Empire, Portugal, Sweden, Denmark–Norway, and various German and Italian states. The First until Fifth Coalitions fell apart when one or more parties were defeated by France and were forced to leave the alliance, and sometimes became French allies; the Sixth and Seventh were dissolved after Napoleon was defeated in 1814 and 1815 and a new balance of power was established between the parties at the Congress of Vienna.

Members of each Coalition
Members	First (1792–1797)	Second (1798–1802)	Third (1803–1806)	Fourth (1806–1807)	Fifth (1809)	Sixth (1813–1814)	Seventh (1815)
(United Kingdom of Great Britain and Ireland) Great Britain	Yes	Yes	Yes	Yes	Yes	Yes	Yes
Holy Roman Empire (to 1806)	Yes	Yes					
(Grand Duchy of Baden) Baden (from 1806) (Note: Part of the Holy Roman Empire (to 1806), then Confederation of the Rhine (1806–1813), then German Confederation (1815–66) member)						Yes (from Oct 1813)	
(Kingdom of Bavaria) Bavaria (from 1806)						Yes (from Oct 1813)	Yes
Nassau (from 1806)							Yes
(Kingdom of Saxony) Saxony (from 1806)				Yes (until Dec 1806)		Yes (from Oct 1813)	
(Kingdom of Württemberg) Württemberg (from 1806)						Yes (from Oct 1813)	
(Duchy of Brunswick) Black Brunswickers (from 1809)					Yes	Yes	Yes
(Province of Hanover) Hanover (from 1814)							Yes
Austrian Empire (from 1804)			Yes (1805)		Yes	Yes	Yes
(Kingdom of Prussia) Prussia	Yes (until 1795)			Yes		Yes	Yes
(Kingdom of Sardinia) Sardinia	Yes (until 1796)	Yes			Yes	Yes	Yes
(Kingdom of Portugal) Portugal	Yes	Yes (until 1801)			Yes	Yes	Yes
Spain	Yes (until 1795)				Yes	Yes	Yes
Ottoman Empire		Yes (until 1801)					
(Russian Empire) Russia		Yes (until 1799)	Yes (1805)	Yes		Yes	Yes
Tuscany (to 1801 and from 1815)		Yes (until 1801)					Yes
(Sovereign Military Order of Malta) Hospitaller Malta		Yes (1798)					
(Kingdom of Naples) Naples	Yes	Yes (until 1801)	Yes (from 1805)				
(Kingdom of Sicily) Sicily			Yes (from 1806)	Yes	Yes	Yes	Yes
(United Kingdom of the Netherlands) Netherlands (Note: Dutch Republic (to 1795) Principality of the United Netherlands (1813–1815) United Kingdom of the Netherlands (from 1815))	Yes (until 1795)					Yes	Yes
Sweden			Yes (from 1805)	Yes		Yes	Yes
Switzerland							Yes

Map of European belligerents, August 1813 French Empire and allies Sixth Coalition and allies

== See also ==
- Lists of battles of the French Revolutionary Wars and Napoleonic Wars
- Coalition forces of the Napoleonic Wars
- Ireland in the French Revolutionary and Napoleonic Wars
- History of the United States (1789–1815)
- Napoleonic Wars
- French Revolutionary Wars

== Bibliography ==
- Clodfelter, M. (2017). Warfare and Armed Conflicts: A Statistical Encyclopedia of Casualty and Other Figures, 1492-2015 (4th ed.). Jefferson, North Carolina: McFarland. ISBN 978-0786474707.
- Hattendorf, John B. (1995). "4. The Struggle with France, 1690–1815". In Hill, J. R. (ed.). The Oxford Illustrated History of the Royal Navy. New York: Oxford University Press. pp. 108–119. ISBN 978-0192116758.
- Rapport, Mike (2013). The Napoleonic Wars: A Very Short Introduction. OUP Oxford. ISBN 978-0-19-164251-7.
