= Panhellenic Liberation Movement =

Panhellenic Liberation Movement Πανελλήνιο Aπελευθερωτικό Κίνημα
- Leader: Andreas Papandreou
- Founded: 28 February 1968
- Dissolved: 3 September 1974
- Split from: Centre Union
- Succeeded by: Panhellenic Socialist Movement (de facto)
- Headquarters: Stockholm
- Ideology: Social democracy Democratic socialism Republicanism; Anti-fascism; Anti-imperialism; Left-wing nationalism Anti-Americanism; Revolutionary socialism Socialist feminism
- Political position: Left-wing
- International affiliation: Socialist International
- Slogan: "National Independence, Popular Sovereignty, Social Liberation, Democratic Process."

Party flag

The Panhellenic Liberation Movement (Greek: Πανελλήνιο Απελευθερωτικό Κίνημα), also known by its acronym PAK (ΠΑΚ), was one of the many anti-dictatorial movement organisations that campaigned against the 1967–1974 military regime of Greece. It was established in 1968 in Sweden by the exiled Andreas Papandreou and its internal operations were led by Giannis Alevras in Greece.

== History ==
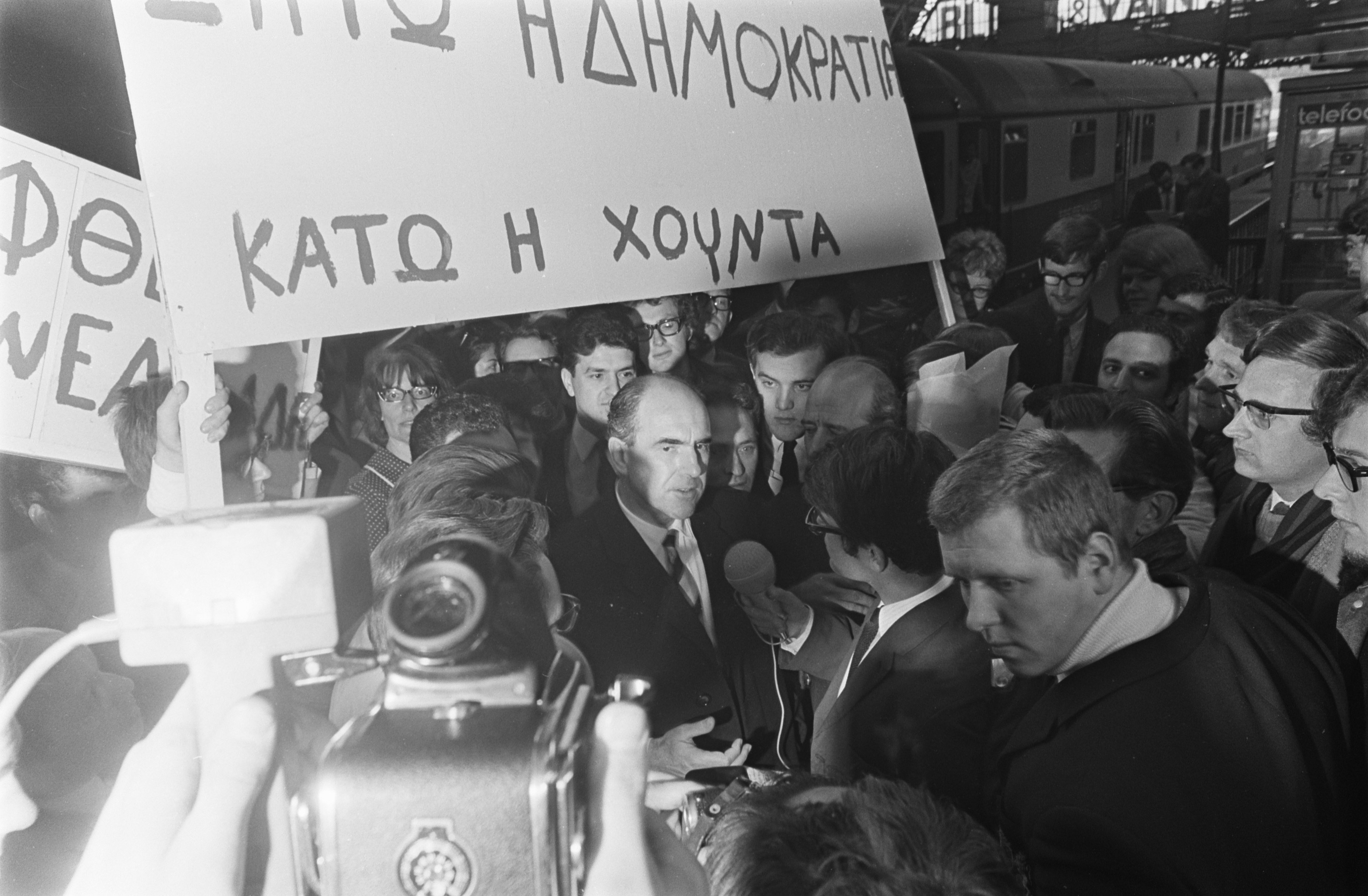
Andreas Papandreou in an anti-dictatorial rally with PAK, Netherlands, 1968

PAK toured the world rallying opposition to the military regime and aiming to create awareness about the political situation in Greece. Its campaign in Sweden was particularly successful. On February 28, 1968, Papandreou gave a famous speech at the Club of Greek Immigrants (Σύλλογος Ελλήνων Μεταναστών).

In May 1971, 8 young men who were alleged to be members of PAK were arrested for making and planting bombs in Athens.

On February 24, 1972 Andreas Papandreou spoke at the "Symposium on Imperialism" about the future PAK is fighting for, he stated

"I am committed to the Panhellenic Liberation Movement until freedom comes to Greece. When it does we will build a socialist society in which human rights are respected and citizens have the right to participate in key decisions."

On April 23, 1972 the 5th anniversary of the Greek junta, Papandreou and other members of PAK participated in a large rally/protest in New York City protesting the regime, among the speakers at the rally was economist and political activist Daniel Ellsberg, Melina Merkouri, Eleni Kazantzaki and Giorgos Vournas. Statements of solidarity by Carlo Levi, senator George McGovern and Vassos Lyssarides were read. Barbara Dane performed songs by Mikis Theodorakis.

PAK's stated aim was to become the centre of democratic resistance in Greece. It not only wished for the withdrawal of the Colonel dictatorship, but it also supported a “free, progressive and nationally free” Greece. It claimed that “it would not accept any compromise in any phase of its struggle and that it would fight for a total democratic victory.”

PAK was also highly critical of the alleged dependence of Greece on foreign powers, namely the USA. Its stated aim was the realization of “radical changes” with the aim of the “socialist transformation of Greece”.

After the fall of the junta, many PAK members became prominent members in Papandreou's Panhellenic Socialist Movement (PASOK) party.

== Publications ==
PAK issued the monthly newsletter "PAK News", the purpose of which was informing the readers about its political actions, giving updates about the trial of the PAK members and reproducing speeches and articles by Andreas Papandreou. It was issued in both Greek and English.

PAK also issued a political manifesto titled “A text-book and the Internal Political Net.”
