= Ireland in the French Revolutionary and Napoleonic Wars =

During the French Revolutionary and Napoleonic Wars, Ireland was part of the British Empire. From 1792 to 1800, the island was a British client state known as the Kingdom of Ireland, before becoming part of the United Kingdom of Great Britain and Ireland on 1 January 1801 under the Acts of Union 1800. Irish nationalists, inspired by the French Revolution, launched the Irish Rebellion of 1798 and Irish rebellion of 1803 to establish an independent Ireland; both were unsuccessful. Irish military personnel fought with all sides of the conflicts, though most served with the British.

== Background ==
Although parts of Ireland had been under English control since the twelfth century, England was in control of the entire island by 1603 due to the Nine Years' War. English rule was reaffirmed by the Cromwellian conquest of Ireland and the Williamite War in Ireland, the latter of which was part of the larger Nine Years' War. During the 17th and early 18th centuries, the Parliament of Ireland, controlled by the Protestant Ascendancy, passed a series of penal laws against Irish Catholics, imposing a variety of legal disabilities against them.

An exodus of Catholic Irish aristocrats, known as the Flight of the Wild Geese, was also a major event in 17th-century Ireland. This exodus provided nations such as France and Spain with elite units often known as Irish Brigades. Among the more well-known was that of the French Bourbon monarchy. Even after the monarchy's fall in the French Revolution, Irish-descended soldiers served successive governments. By the early 1790s, tensions in Ireland – and in continental Europe – had grown. On the Continent, the new French Republic was embroiled in wars with Britain, the Holy Roman Empire, and other states. In Ireland, many dissenters, inspired by events of the French Revolution, founded the Society of United Irishmen, with early members including Theobald Wolfe Tone and Henry Joy McCracken.

== 1798 Irish rebellion ==
=== Prelude ===
The Dublin Castle administration had been suspicious of the intentions of the United Irishmen since the founding of the organisation. When, in 1794, dealings between Tone and the French government were discovered, the group was broken up. It soon reorganised, becoming more secretive and even more determined to overthrow British rule in Ireland. In late 1796, a large French invasion armada, carrying as many as 14,000 soldiers, arrived off Ireland's south coast. Dangerous weather forced the fleet to return to France, though, and a rebellion, seemingly imminent, failed to materialise. By 1798, the Dublin Castle administration had succeeded in attempts to jail leaders of the United Irishmen and had even infiltrated the organisation.

=== Uprising ===
Despite government repression, and the lack of French assistance, the long-expected Irish revolt broke out in late May 1798. Rebels seized mail coaches near Dublin, giving the signal that the revolt was to begin. A blow was handed to the United Irishmen, spearheading the revolt, when Dubliners did not rise up against the Crown, but the uprising was rejuvenated by an unexpected turn of events in County Wexford, where a detachment of North Cork Militia had been attacked.

Loyal forces in Wexford managed to hold several key towns, and the rebels in this area were defeated in the Battle of Vinegar Hill in June. When a small French force landed in Ireland that month, they achieved an initial victory but were soon defeated and forced to surrender. Other revolts across Ireland, including one in Ulster, were also suppressed.

=== Aftermath ===
The rebellion was soon completely suppressed, in part because of the efforts of Lord Cornwallis, the Viceroy of Ireland. In the aftermath of the uprising, the Act of Union 1800 was passed in the Irish and British parliaments, dissolving the Kingdom of Ireland and transforming it into the United Kingdom of Great Britain and Ireland.

== Ireland in the Napoleonic Wars ==
By 1803, the French Revolutionary Wars (or those of the First and Second Coalitions) had ended, with the 1799 rise of Napoleon Bonaparte to the French First Consulate and, a few years later, the imperial throne. A peace had been established between the warring nations of Europe, but it did not last long. However, a minor revolt, known as the Emmet Rebellion, occurred in Ireland in 1803.

=== Emmet's rising ===
Along with fellow nationalists, Robert Emmet and his elder brother Thomas, both members of the weakened United Irishmen, planned a second Irish rebellion of 1803, this time with French aid expected. When, in July of that year, an arsenal of the rebel group exploded, Emmet advanced the uprising, now ruling out any chance of French involvement. A crowd of about 200 Dubliners under the command of Emmet began to march on Dublin Castle (Thomas was in France, negotiating with Napoleon).

The major event of this revolt was the death of Viscount Kilwarden, the Lord Chief Justice of Ireland. As the rebels approached, Kilwarden, fearing for his safety, fled his home with his daughter and a nephew, Reverend Wolfe. The rebels surrounded the chief justice's carriage, killing his nephew and nearly killing Kilwarden. Emmet had not authorised the attack (Kilwarden died later) and, seeing that rebels in the countryside had not risen, fired a flare, the signal to call off the uprising. A few of his men refused to obey orders and engaged in skirmishes with government soldiers, who retreated to their barracks. The revolt was over quickly. Emmet was arrested and later executed.

=== Quiet in Ireland ===
After Emmet's abortive rising, there were no instances of unrest in Ireland until after 1815, when the Napoleonic Wars ended with Bonaparte's final defeat, the Battle of Waterloo. Some Irishmen, including Emmet's brother Thomas, had by then become hostile to the French, embittered toward them for failing to offer greater assistance in the revolts and for refusing to plan any more invasions after 1803.
