= John Robert Seeley =

English historian and political essayist (1834–1895)

Sir John Robert Seeley KCMG
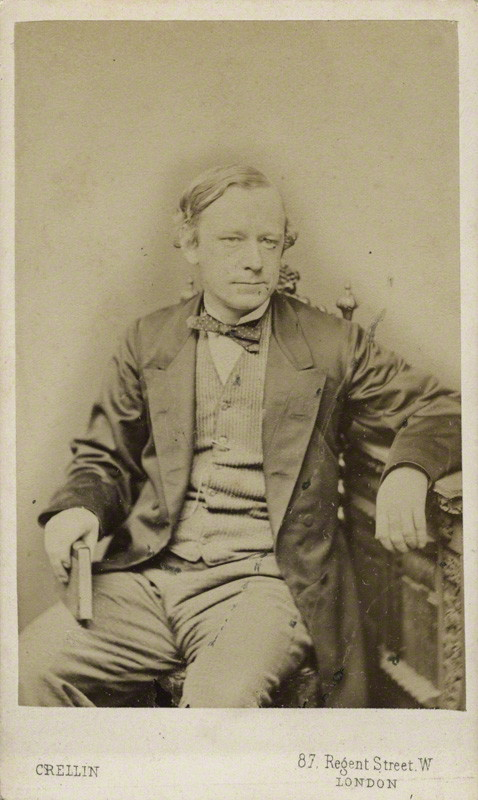
- Seeley in 1866
- Born: 10 September 1834; London, England
- Died: 13 January 1895 (aged 60); Cambridge, England
- Education: City of London School
- Alma mater: Christ's College, Cambridge
- Occupation: Historian
- Notable work: The Expansion of England (1883)
- Spouse: Mary Agnes Phillot
- Awards: Knight Commander of the Order of St Michael and St George

Sir John Robert Seeley, KCMG (10 September 1834 – 13 January 1895) was an English Liberal historian and political essayist. A founder of British imperial history, he was a prominent advocate for the British Empire, promoting a concept of Greater Britain. This he expounded in his most widely known book The Expansion of England (1883). While he was an early advocate of the establishment of political science as a distinct academic discipline, he retained a theological approach in which this was embedded.

== Early life ==
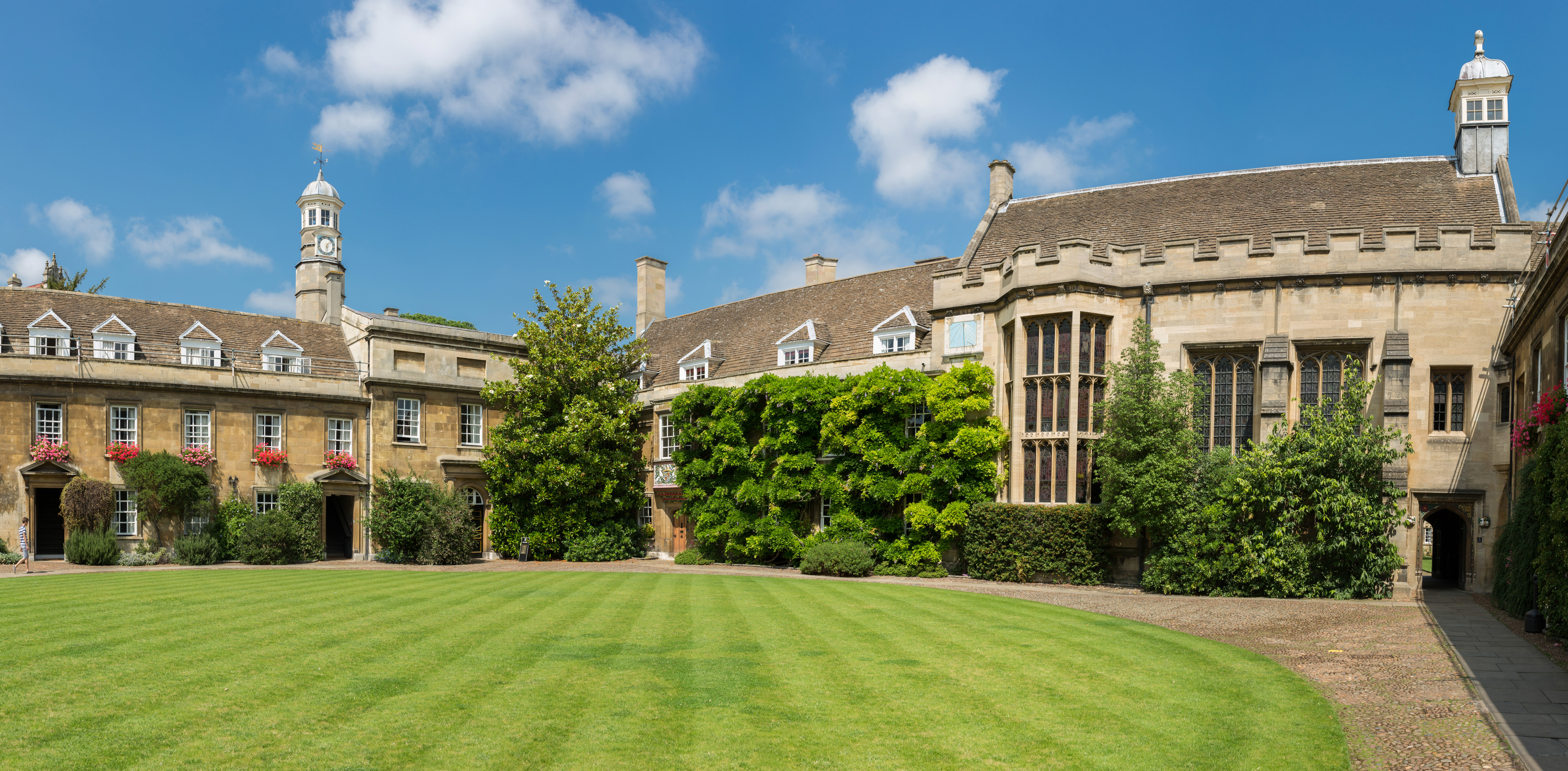
Seeley was educated at Christ's College, Cambridge

Seeley was born in London. His father was Robert Benton Seeley, a publisher who issued books under the name of Seeley, Jackson and Halliday, was a strong advocate of Evangelical Anglicanism, and was the author of several religious books and of The Life and Times of Edward I. His mother was Mary Ann Jackson (1809–1868), who shared her husband's religious views. Her brother, John Henry Jackson, was a partner in Robert Seeley's publishing company. John was related to the chemist Arthur Herbert Church, a cousin through his mother.

John was educated at City of London School, where he enjoyed history, theology and literature. While there, he wrote two essays comparing Shakespeare and classical Greek drama in 1850 and 1851, the latter of which won him a Beaufoy Prize, now held by the Heberden Coin Room, Ashmolean Museum, Oxford. He went on to Christ's College, Cambridge, where he was head of the Classical tripos and senior Chancellor's medallist. His education at Cambridge was interrupted by illness and he only completed his exams in 1858. During his time at Christ's he became friends with Charles Stuart Calverley, John Wesley Hales, Walter Besant, Walter Skeat and Walter Sendall. He was elected a fellow of Christ's and subsequently became a classical studies tutor at the college. He published an anonymous book of poetry and then went through a personal crisis during which he abandoned many of the conventional beliefs of his youth and sought to replace them with better-founded, secure beliefs. He left Cambridge in 1860.

== Middle and later life ==
Seeley returned to his old school, where he became a teacher. In 1863, he was appointed professor of Latin at University College, London. This drew him into quite different intellectual circles. Seeley believed many of the staff at University College to be anti-Christian. Some of these—and of his other London acquaintances—were Positivists who followed Auguste Comte in asserting that all genuine knowledge was based on experiment and logic, and some of whom were interested in Comte's Religion of Humanity. One such was Edward Spencer Beesly. Seeley also mixed with Christian Socialists, and in 1862 and 1863 taught in the Working Men's College under its founder and principal, F. D. Maurice.

Seeley developed his own approach to reconciling religion with the needs of modern society, which bore fruit in 1865 with his first published book, Ecce Homo: A Survey of the Life and Work of Jesus Christ. His authorship was anonymous partly because he feared upsetting colleagues and members of his family with views that might seem impious, but several of them were upset anyway, the authorship becoming an open secret by the end of 1866. However, the work, widely controversial as it was, attracted favourable attention as well as disparagement. One of the warmest reviews was penned by the leading politician William Gladstone. In 1869 Gladstone, having become Prime Minister the previous year, bore the duty of recommending a new Regius Professor of Modern History at Cambridge University, an appointment that went to Seeley despite his lack of publications in the field, after two other preferred candidates (one of them James Spedding) dropped out.

In August 1869, Seeley married Mary Agnes Phillot (1839–1921), who was a granddaughter of William Frend and a sister of Constance Phillott. Despite his Cambridge appointment, the couple maintained their main home in London until 1880, although Seeley often stayed in lodgings at the university in term time. As Regius Professor, Seeley described himself as a Liberal in politics, but a Radical in education; he made important contributions to education reform, including on the admission of women into the ancient universities.

He is buried in the Mill Road Cemetery, Cambridge, with his wife.

== Works ==
=== Ecce Homo: A Survey in the Life and Work of Jesus Christ (1865) ===
Seeley's first published book was Ecce Homo: A Survey of the Life and Work of Jesus Christ, which was published anonymously in 1865. It set itself the questions: "What was Christ's object in founding the Society which is called by his name, and how is it adapted to attain that object?" and proposed to investigate these by studying Jesus biographically, without relying on the established views of religious authorities but looking at "the facts themselves, critically weighed". It purports to show how Jesus, through the impressiveness of his personality and the brilliance of his plan, created a "divine society...that...has extended over a large and the most highly civilised portion of the earth's surface, and...continues full of vigour at the present day", and how, for the members of this society, Jesus "raised the feeling of humanity from being a feeble restraining power to be an inspiring passion".

The book sold well on its release, partly due to being controversial among reviewers and public figures, the controversy being cleverly stimulated by its publisher, Macmillan. The eminent politician Lord Shaftesbury famously spoke of it as a "most pestilential book....vomited from the jaws of Hell". Many, in more moderate language, expressed disgust or mistrust at its avoidance of mainstream theological themes such as affirmation of the reality of Christ's miracles. But others found it to be a sincere-sounding defence of faith for the modern-minded from the more extreme scepticism propounded in the Lives of Jesus written by David Strauss and Ernest Renan. The widespread perplexity was summed up by Cardinal Newman in writing that it was impossible to tell whether the author was "an orthodox believer on his road to liberalism, or a liberal on his road to orthodoxy".

Many considered the book to be extraordinary in its prose style in addition to in its content. It is characterised by relatively terse and fluid prose. Its anonymous status also added a significant dimension to the controversy surrounding its publication, as readers sought to discover the author's identity. George Eliot, John Henry Newman, William Ewart Gladstone and Napoleon III were some of the more well-known figures believed to have written the book. Seeley was eventually discovered as the author, and from November 1866, his authorship became an open secret. However, Seeley declined to acknowledge publicly his authorship of Ecce Homo, which was first officially stated only in a posthumous edition that was produced in 1895.

=== Subsequent work ===
His later essay on Natural Religion, signed "by the Author of Ecce Homo," which denied that supernaturalism is essential to religion and maintained that the negations of science tend to purify rather than destroy Christianity, satisfied few and excited far less interest than his earlier work. In 1869, Seeley was appointed professor of modern history at the University of Cambridge. He was a popular instructor and prepared his lectures carefully, which were well attended. In historical work, he is distinguished as a thinker rather than as a scholar. He valued history solely in its relation to politics as the science of the state. He maintained that history should be studied scientifically and for a practical purpose, the solution of existing political questions. Thus, he naturally devoted himself mainly to recent history, especially the relations between England and other states. His Life and Times of Stein, a valuable narrative of the anti-Napoleonic revolt, led by Prussia mainly at Heinrich Friedrich Karl von und zum Stein's instigation, was written under German influence and shows little of the style of his short essays. Its length, its colourlessness and the space that it devotes to subsidiary matters render it unattractive.

=== The Expansion of England (1883) ===
Far otherwise was Seeley's The Expansion of England (1883). Written in his best manner, that essay answered to his theory that history should be used for a practical purpose and pointed out how and why Britain gained its colonies and India, the character of the British Empire and the light in which it should be regarded. As a historical essay, the book was a fine composition, and its defence of the empire was then very persuasive. His defence consisted largely of the claim that British rule was in India's best interest. Seeley also questioned the usefulness of India to the power and security of Britain and even claimed that there was 'no doubt' that India vastly increased the responsibilities and dangers to Britain. The book contains this much-quoted statement: "we seem, as it were, to have conquered half the world in a fit of absence of mind." It appeared at an opportune time and did much to make Englishmen regard the colonies not as mere appendages but as an expansion of the British state as well as of British nationality and to remind them of the value of the empire in the East. The essay was reprinted ten times in the year in which it was published and many more times in later years. In 1894 Seeley was rewarded for public service by being made a Knight Commander of the Order of St Michael and St George, on the recommendation of Lord Rosebery.

In the spring of 1883, Seeley started a debate over the Tripos bachelor's honours exam at Cambridge, wishing it to concentrate on political history, but historians Frederick William Maitland, George Walter Prothero, Henry Melvill Gwatkin and Mandell Creighton argued for a broader more scientific approach, reaching a compromise emphasising the reading of primary sources, requiring a compulsory paper on "Political Science", with required readings including Introduction to Political Science (1896) by Seeley and The Elements of Politics (1891) by Sidgwick.

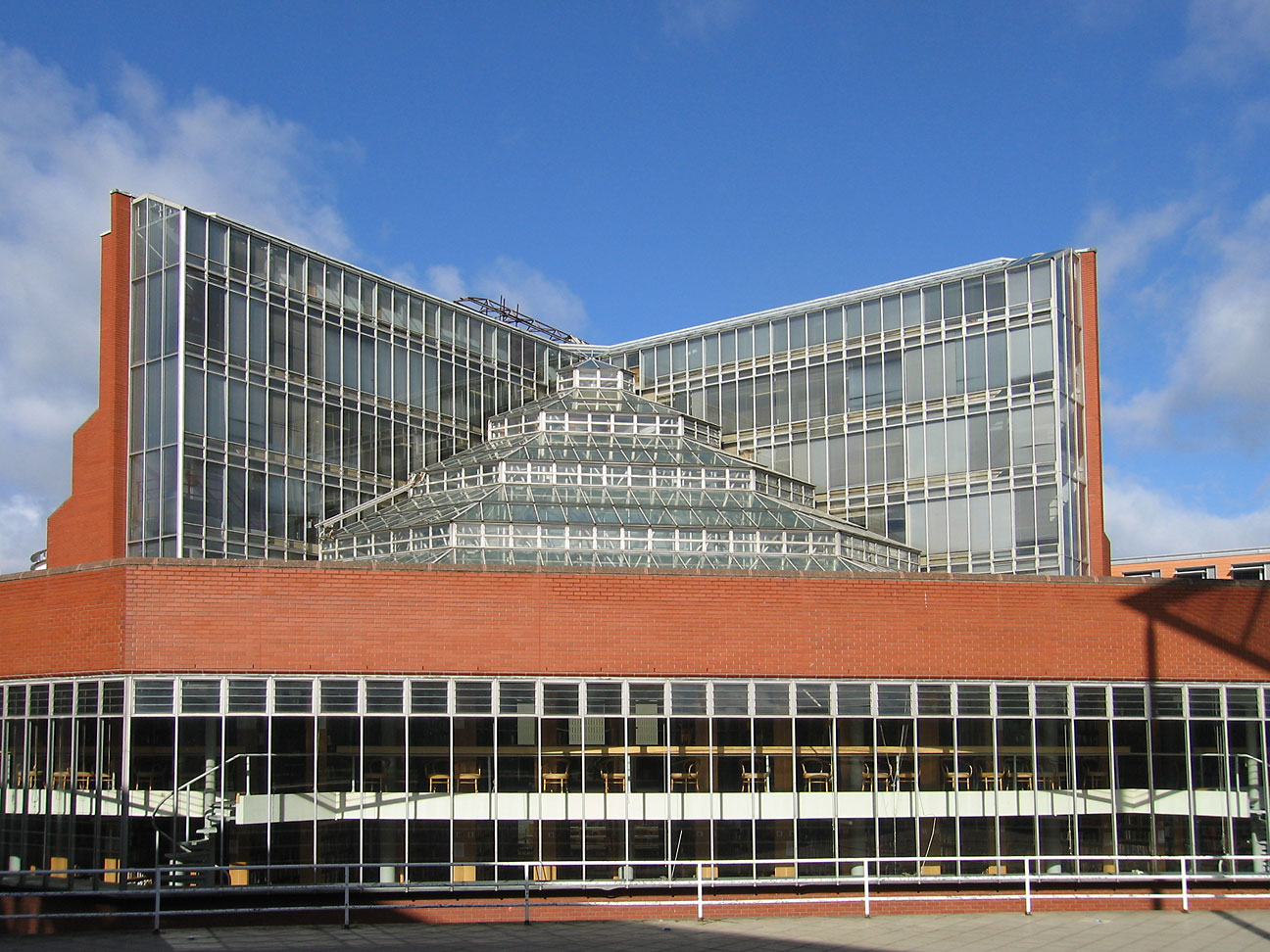
Seeley Historical Library, Cambridge

=== The Growth of British Policy ===
His last book, The Growth of British Policy, written as an essay and intended to be an introduction to a full account of the expansion of Britain, was published posthumously.

=== Later matters ===
Inagaki Manjiro dedicated his Japan and the Pacific and the Japanese View of the Eastern Question (1890) to Seeley, who had taught him at Caius College.

Correspondence to and from Seeley, including that relating to the publication of and reactions to Ecce Homo, is held by the archives in Senate House Library.

In 1897, the history library of the University of Cambridge was named the Seeley Historical Library in his honour. In 1895 a memorial fund was raised to commemorate his services to the British Empire and to the university; the greater part of this fund was devoted to the endowment of the library. After moving from King's College and Caius College, in 1912, the collection relocated to the newly reopened Arts School, Bene't Street, then in 1935 to the Old Schools. In 1968 the Seeley moved to the Sidgwick Site of Cambridge University as part of the new History Faculty building designed by James Stirling.

== Significance of empire ==
Seeley wrote that the first chapter of the history of British India "embraces chronologically the first half of George III's reign, that stormy period of transition in English history when at the same time America was lost and India won... [and] covers the two great careers of Robert Clive and Hastings... [T]he end of the struggle is marked by the reign of Lord Cornwallis, which began in 1785".

He argued that British rule in India survived because Indians were divided along racial and social lines and they were able to suppress the Rebellion of 1857 partly by exploiting those divisions.

You see, the mutiny was in a great measure put down by turning the races of India against each other. So long as this can be done, and so long as the population have not formed the habit of criticising their Government... the government of India from England is possible, and there is nothing miraculous about it. But, as I said, if this state of things should alter, if by any process the population should be welded into a single nationality... then I do not say we ought to begin to fear for our dominion, I say we ought to cease at once to hope for it.

— The Expansion of England

The trial of Warren Hastings had been the final act in the efforts spanning the eighteenth century to harness imperial power, along with imperial wealth and prestige, securely to Britain, both as a "nation" and as a "state". Once Edmund Burke had succeeded in that endeavour, the stain of commercial origins could be removed, with the special mix of economic and political interests realigned as the expression of national interest and the blot of scandal washed out, as the moral mandate for a new kind of imperial project was launched.

=== Blinkers of English historiography ===
Seeley was far more astute than many later imperial historians, as he complained that very transformation had made possible a national amnesia about the significance of empire in the history of England itself. His lectures were filled with a critique of the blinkers of English historiography: "They [our historians] make too much of the parliamentary wrangle and the agitations about liberty, in all which matters the eighteenth century of England was but a pale reflection of the seventeenth. They do not perceive that in that century the history of England is not in England but in Americas and Asia".

=== Justifications for empire ===
Seeley's account of imperial wars and conquest repeats the justifications made first by the conquerors themselves: the sole objective of trade turned into political conquest by accident, rather than contrivance or calculation.

Most historians have argued that the East India Company was drawn reluctantly into political and military conflict in India, and took an interest in territorial power and revenue only as a last-ditch effort to protect its trading activities. Among the narratives of imperial historians, Seeley concurred and wrote that India "lay there waiting to be picked up by somebody". He considered that what happened in India in the late 18th century was thus an "internal revolution", rather than a "foreign conquest".

== Notable quotations ==
"History is the school of statesmanship".

"History without politics descends to mere literature".

He is often erroneously believed to have said, "History is past politics, and politics present history".

== Works ==
- Ecce Homo: A Survey of the Life and Work of Jesus Christ. Roberts Brothers. 1866.
- Life and Times of Stein; Or, Germany and Prussia in the Romantic Age (Vol. I). Roberts Brothers. 1878.
- Life and Times of Stein; Or, Germany and Prussia in the Romantic Age (Vol. II). Roberts Brothers. 1878.
- Life and Times of Stein; Or, Germany and Prussia in the Romantic Age (Vol. III). Roberts Brothers. 1878.
- Natural Religion. Macmillan and Co. 1882.
- The Expansion of England. Little, Brown. 1922 [1883].
- A Short History of Napoleon the First. Roberts Brothers. 1886
- Goethe: Reviewed after Sixty Years. 1894.
- The Growth of British Policy. Cambridge University Press. 1922 [1895].
- Introduction to Political Science: Two Series of Lectures. Macmillan. 1896.
- Elleke Boehmer, ed. (1998). "Expansion of England". Empire Writing: An Anthology of Colonial Literature, 1870–1918. Oxford University Press. ISBN 978-0-19-283265-8.
