= Attempted assassination of Vassos Lyssarides =

On August 30, 1974, an attempted assassination of Vassos Lyssarides, prominent supporter of Makarios III, failed to kill Lyssarides, but killed EDEK youth leader Doros Loizou and injured three others.

Loizou drove the car Lyssarides and Barbara Bell were riding in, and, after being shot at, immediately accelerated, saving the lives of the passengers. He himself died.

Time magazine said Lyssarides was slightly wounded, his wife badly hit, and that Loizou and a bystander were killed. It claimed that Greek Cypriot extremists were the suspected assassins.

According to the Financial Mirror, "It is believed the assassins were remnants of the EOKA B underground movement".
