= Walter Joseph Sendall =

British colonial governor

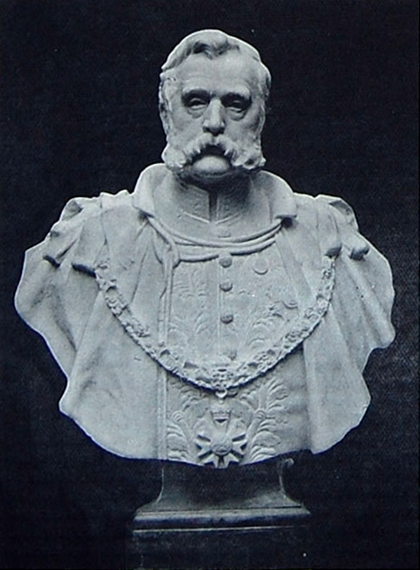
Sir Walter Sendall, Governor of Cyprus (1892-1898)

Sir Walter Joseph Sendall GCMG (24 December 1832 – 16 March 1904) was a British colonial governor.

== Early life ==
Sendall was born in Langham, Suffolk and attended King Edward VI School, Bury St Edmunds. He then entered Christ's College, Cambridge in 1854. Here he became friends of Walter Besant, John Peile, John Robert Seeley, and Charles Stuart Calverley. He later married Sophie Calverley, his sister.

== Career as a colonialist ==
As Director of Public Instruction in Ceylon, he expanded the system of schools, teaching in English and the vernacular.

He was Governor-in-Chief of the Windward Islands, from 1885 to 1889. There he promoted road construction in Grenada, and founded a botanical garden. He suspended the Legislative Council on St. Vincent, rather than appoint black members he felt were unqualified. After some hesitation, he supported finance for the Grenada Boys' Secondary School.

He was Governor of Barbados from 1889 to 1891. He was High Commissioner of Cyprus, from 1892 to 1898. He was Governor of British Guiana, from 1898 to 1901.

He was the brother-in-law of the English poet and wit Charles Stuart Calverley.

== Honours ==
He was Companion of the Order of St Michael and St George in 1887, knighted KCMG in 1889, and GCMG in 1899.

In July 1902 he received an honorary degree LL.D. from the University of Edinburgh.
