= ETHA Engomis FC =

- Founded: 1962

ETHA Engomis FC was a Cypriot football club based in Engomi, Nicosia. Founded in 1962, it played in the fourth division.

The team dissolved after 1988. The team was part of the sports club ETHA Engomis.
