= Charles Stuart Calverley =

19th-century English poet

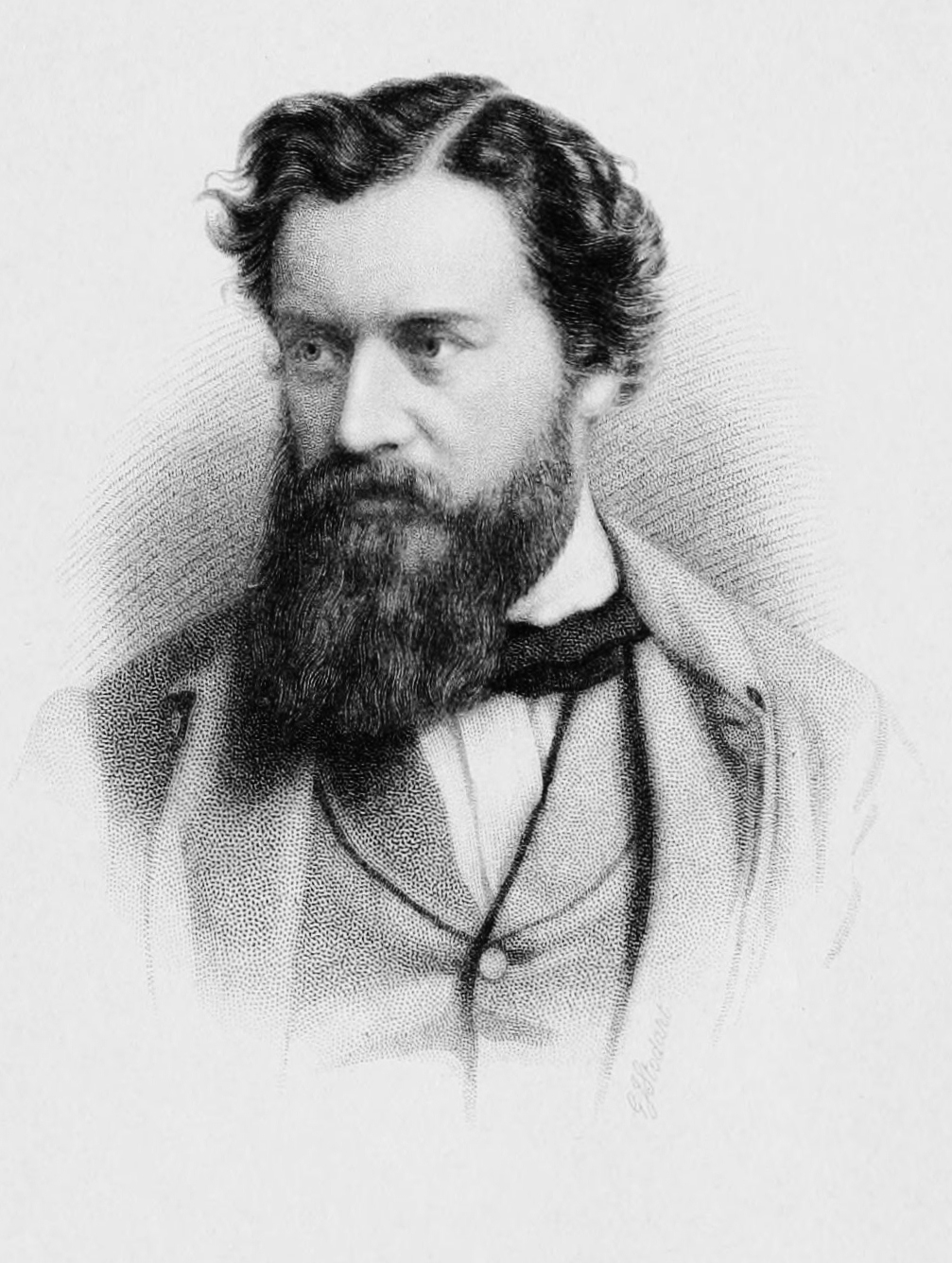
- Born: 22 December 1831; Worcestershire
- Died: 17 February 1884 (aged 52)

Signature
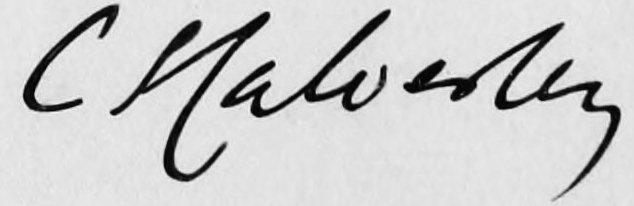

Charles Stuart Calverley (/ˈkɑːvərlɪ/; 22 December 1831 – 17 February 1884) was an English poet and wit. He was the literary father of what has been called "the university school of humour".

== Early life ==
He was born at Martley, Worcestershire, and given the name Charles Stuart Blayds. In 1852, his father, the Rev. Henry Blayds, resumed the old family name of Calverley, which his grandfather had exchanged for Blayds in 1807. Charles went up to Balliol College, Oxford, from Harrow School in 1850, and was soon known in Oxford as the most daring and high-spirited undergraduate of his time. He was a universal favourite, a delightful companion, a brilliant scholar and the playful enemy of all "dons." In 1851 he won the Chancellor's prize for Latin verse, but it is said that the entire exercise was written in an afternoon, when his friends had locked him into his rooms, refusing to let him out until he had finished what they were confident would prove the prize poem.

A year later, to avoid the consequences of a college escapade (he had been expelled from Oxford), like his father, he too changed his name to Calverley and moved to Christ's College, Cambridge. Here he was again successful in Latin verse, the only undergraduate to have won the Chancellor's prize at both universities. In 1856 he took second place in the first class in the Classical Tripos.

== Later life ==
He was elected fellow of Christ's (1858), published Verses and Translations in 1862, and was called to the bar in 1865. Injuries sustained in a skating accident prevented him from following a professional career, and during the last years of his life he was an invalid. He died of Bright's disease.

== Works ==
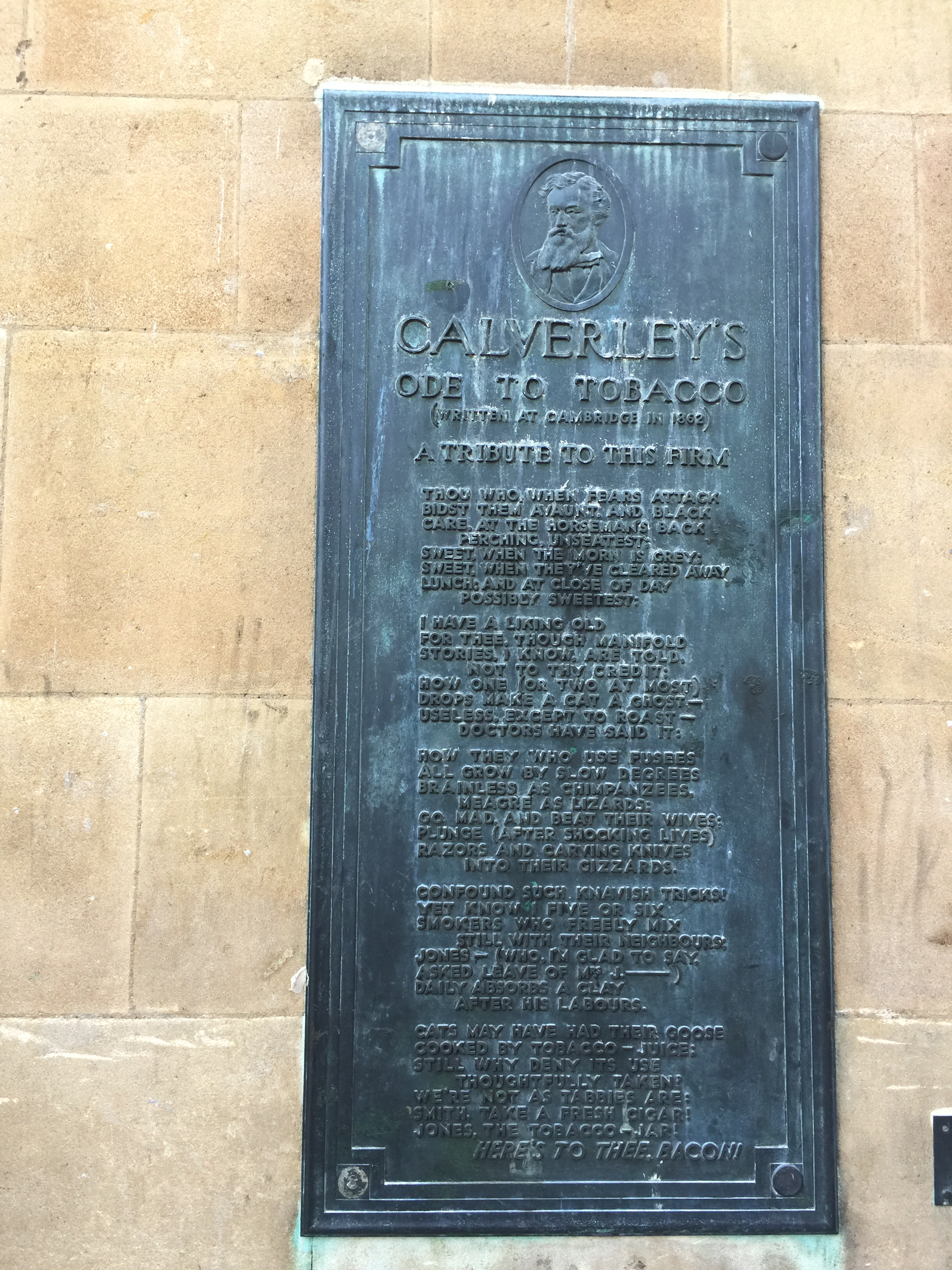
Calverley's "Ode to Tobacco" (plaque on corner of Market Hill, Cambridge)

Nowadays he is best-known (at least in Cambridge, his adoptive home) as the author of the "Ode to Tobacco" (1862) which is to be found on a bronze plaque in Rose Crescent, on the wall of what used to be Bacon's the tobacconist. It concludes:

Cats may have had their goose
Cooked by tobacco juice;
Still, why deny its use
Thoughtfully taken?
We're not as tabbies are;
Smith, take a fresh cigar!
Jones, the tobacco jar!
Here's to thee, Bacon!"

His poem Beer is also notable, for its light mocking of Greek gods who, surprisingly, did not drink beer, and continues to extol:

"O Beer! O Hodgson, Guinness, Allsopp, Bass!
Names that should be on every infant's tongue!"

His Translations into English and Latin appeared in 1866; his Theocritus translated into English Verse in 1869; Fly Leaves in 1872; and Literary Remains in 1885.

His Complete Works, with a biographical notice by Walter Joseph Sendall, a contemporary at Christ's and his brother-in-law, appeared in 1901.

George W. E. Russell said of him:

He was a true poet; he was one of the most graceful scholars that Cambridge ever produced; and all his exuberant fun was based on a broad and strong foundation of Greek, Latin and English literature.
