= The Expansion of England =

1883 book by John Robert Seeley

The Expansion of England: Two Courses of Lectures
- Author: John Robert Seeley
- Language: English
- Publication date: 1883

The Expansion of England: Two Courses of Lectures is a book by English historian John Robert Seeley about the growth of the British Empire, first published in 1883. Seeley argued that British colonial expansion was based on its victories over France during the early 18th century, and that the Dominions were critical to British power. He also stated that holding onto British India might not be beneficial to Britain in the long run. The book was a popular success in the UK, and several historians have stated that it had great impact upon British imperial thinking.

== Background ==
Seeley was professor of history at University College London from 1860 to 1869, followed by the Regius Professor of Modern History at the University of Cambridge from 1869 to 1895. The Expansion of England consists of two lectures Seeley delivered at the University in autumn 1881 and spring 1882. They were substantially modified and, at the prompting of Florence Nightingale, they were published in book form eighteen months later. It was written at a time of rapid expansion in the British Empire. Seeley's view was that the true function of history was "to exhibit the general tendency of English affairs in such a way as to set us thinking about the future, and divining the destiny which is reserved for us". History had no existence independent of politics: "Politics and history are only different aspects of the same study".

== Premise ==
Seeley famously remarked, "We seem, as it were, to have conquered and peopled half the world in a fit of absence of mind". In Seeley's view, the British victories over France during the early 18th century were the foundations of Britain's major expansion. Seeley wrote that the 18th century should be seen as a struggle between European nations for the possession of the New World, rather than a struggle for liberty between the king and the parliament.

Seeley noted that it was possible for the dominions to become independent of Britain: "Such a separation would leave England on the same level as the states nearest to us on the Continent, populous, but less so than Germany and scarcely equal to France. But two states, Russia and the United States, would be on an altogether higher scale of magnitude, Russia having at once, and the United States perhaps before very long, twice our population". However, he also stated, "The other alternative is that England may prove able to do what the United States does so easily, that is, hold together in a federal union countries very remote from each other. In that case England will take rank with Russia and the United States in the first rank of state, measured by population and area, and in a higher rank that the states of the Continent".

Seeley also doubted the wisdom of holding onto India: "It may be fairly questioned whether the possession of India does or ever can increase our power or our security, while there is no doubt that it vastly increases our dangers and responsibilities". He also claimed, "When we inquire then into the Greater Britain of the future we ought to think much more of our colonial than of our Indian Empire".

== His Works ==
The book was a success, selling 80,000 copies within two years. The book sold 11,000 copies when a newer edition was brought out in 1919, and 3,000 in 1931. In 1895, H. A. L. Fisher asked in the Fortnightly Review whether any previous historical work could be said to have left as profound a mark on "the general political thinking of a nation". Joseph Jacobs in the Saturday Review claimed that "surely since Sieyès no pamphlet has ever had such immediate and wide-reaching influence". G. W. Prothero stated in the Dictionary of National Biography (1897) that "it contributed perhaps more than any other single utterance to the change of feeling respecting the relations between Great Britain and her colonies which marks the end of the nineteenth century".

Historians have also commented on its impact. In John Gross' opinion, "Few works of the same unmistakably academic stamp can ever have created so immediate a stir". According to George Peabody Gooch, the book "became the bible of British Imperialists". Robert Ensor claimed that the book was "the single influence which did most to develop the imperialist idea".

The German Crown Princess Victoria wrote to her mother, Queen Victoria, in May 1884: "How I wish, dear Mama, you would read that admirable little book, The Expansion of England, by Prof. Seeley!! It is wonderful and so statesmanlike, so farsighted, clear, and fair".

Alfred Tennyson sent a copy of the book to Liberal Prime Minister William Ewart Gladstone. Gladstone was guarded in his praise: "Although I think a Professor gets upon rather slippery ground when he undertakes to deal with politics more practical than historical or scientific, yet it is certainly most desirable that English folk should consider their position, present and prospective, in the world". Fellow Gladstonian liberal and anti-imperialist, John Morley, reviewed the book and noted how greatly its tone differed from Goldwin Smith's The Empire published twenty years previously. Morley stated that the territorial expansion of England was secondary to, and caused by, her industrial expansion. He also stated that attempts to determine the respective powers of colonial legislatures to the imperial parliament would be complicated, and predicted that an imperial federal union would flounder on two issues: disputes over tariffs, and the treatment of indigenous peoples. He went on to say that no one believed that representatives from the colonies would ever agree to vote funds for a peculiarly British commitment such as the defence of the neutrality of Belgium.

The English Radical and imperialist politician Joseph Chamberlain was greatly impressed with the book and claimed that he had sent his son Austen Chamberlain to Cambridge because Seeley was there. The Liberal Imperialist Lord Rosebery was profoundly affected by the book and it persuaded him to make the Empire one of his primary concerns. One of his biographers remarked that Seeley was Rosebery's mentor. When Rosebery became Prime Minister in 1894, one of his first acts was to recommend that Seeley be awarded an honour. He was duly appointed Knight Commander of the Order of St Michael and St George.

In his history of the British Empire, written in 1940, A. P. Newton lamented that Seeley "dealt in the main with the great wars of the eighteenth century and this gave the false impression that the British Empire has been founded largely by war and conquest, an idea that was unfortunately planted firmly in the public mind, not only in Great Britain, but also in foreign countries".

Lord Moran in his diary recorded a conversation with Winston Churchill on 30 May 1955: "I told him that I had read Seeley's Expansion of England in my youth and it opened up a new world. He looked very sad, but all he said was: ‘Now it would be Seeley's Contraction of England.’"

The book finally went out of print in 1956, the year of the Suez Crisis.

According to historian David Armitage, Seeley's book inspired the creation of the subfield of Imperial History.

== See also ==
- Historiography of the British Empire
