= Georgios Ladas =

Cypriot politician

- Γεώργιος Λαδάς

5th President of the House of Representatives
- In office 4 June 1981 – 30 December 1985
- Preceded by: Alekos Michaelides
- Succeeded by: Vassos Lyssarides

Personal details
- Born: 2 August 1913 Nicosia, Cyprus
- Died: 1997 (aged 83–84)
- Party: DIKO

Georgios Ladas (2 August 1913 – 1997) was a Cypriot politician born in Nicosia.

Ladas studied law, political and economic sciences in Athens. He was member of DIKO. He was elected President of the House of Representatives of Cyprus from 1981 to 1985.
