= Alexis Galanos =

Greek Cypriot politician (1940–2019)

- Αλέξης Γαλανός

7th President of the House of Representatives
- In office 30 May 1991 – 6 June 1996
- Preceded by: Vassos Lyssarides
- Succeeded by: Spyros Kyprianou

Mayor-in-exile of Famagusta
- In office 1 January 2006 – 15 July 2019
- Preceded by: Giannakis Skordis
- Succeeded by: Simos Ioannou

Personal details
- Born: 30 August 1940 Limassol, Cyprus
- Died: 15 July 2019 (aged 78) Kos, Greece
- Children: 2

Alexis Galanos (Greeκ: Αλέξης Γαλανός; 30 August 1940 – 15 July 2019) was a Greek Cypriot politician. He was President of the House of Representatives of Cyprus from 1991 to 1996. He studied Economics at King's College, Cambridge and Law at Inner Temple.

== Political career ==
He was one of the founders of the Democratic Party (DIKO) and served the party from many positions. He was DIKO's Secretary General from 1989 until 1990 and its Vice-President from 1990 until 1996. He was also an elected member of the House of Representatives from 1976 until 1999. In 1991 the majority of the members of the House of Representatives elected him as President. In 1998, he announced his decision to resign as a member of DIKO because he disagreed with Spyros Kyprianou's decision to support Giorgos Iakovou in the 1998 presidential election and in 1999 he resigned as a member of the House of Representatives as well. In 1998 he created the Eurodemocratic Renewal Party (Komma Evrodimokratikis Ananeosis, KEA), and was its first president. Alexis was a candidate in the 1998 presidential elections and gained 16,003 votes (4.04%). In the 2003 presidential election, he supported Tassos Papadopoulos. He was also a candidate for the 2004 European Parliament elections with DIKO but failed to be elected.

== Mayor-in-exile of Famagusta ==
Alexis was, at the time of his death, the mayor-in-exile of the city of Famagusta, a position to which he was elected on 17 December 2006.

== Chairman of the Board of the Bank of Cyprus ==
Alexis Galanos was suggested to be appointed Chairman of the Board of the Bank of Cyprus by the Central Bank of Cyprus but was eventually disqualified for legal reasons.

Preceded by Vassos Lyssaridis	President of the House of Representatives; 1991– 1996	Succeeded by Spyros Kyprianou
