= Vassos Lyssarides =

Cypriot politician (1920–2021)

- Βάσος Λυσσαρίδης
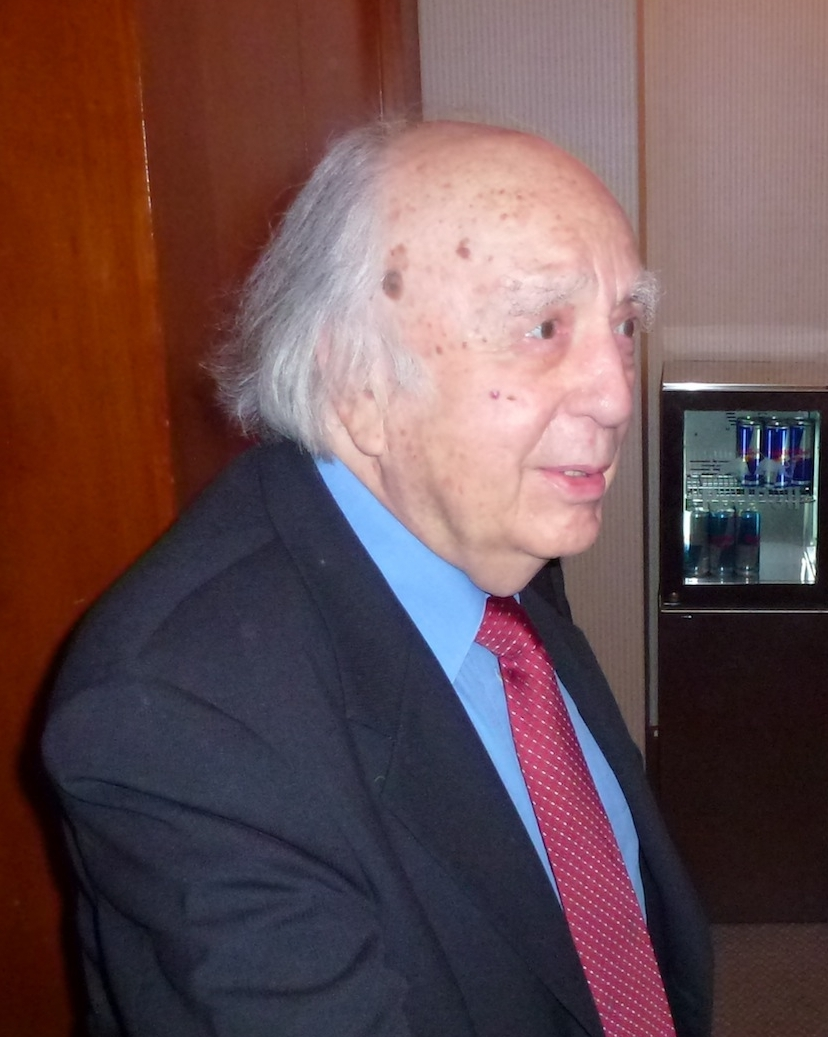
- Lyssarides in 2011

President of the House of Representatives
- In office 30 December 1985 – 30 May 1991
- Preceded by: Georgios Ladas
- Succeeded by: Alexis Galanos

Member of the House of Representatives
- In office 16 August 1960 – 31 May 2006
- Constituency: Nicosia

President of EDEK
- In office 6 February 1969 – 21 July 2001
- Preceded by: None (party established)
- Succeeded by: Yiannakis Omirou

Representative of the Parliamentary Assembly of the Council of Europe
- In office 21 April 1986 – 28 June 1991
- Constituency: Cyprus

Personal details
- Born: 13 May 1920 Pano Lefkara, British Cyprus
- Died: 26 April 2021 (aged 100) Nicosia, Cyprus
- Party: EDEK (since 1969)
- Other political affiliations: PM (1959–1969)
- Spouse: Barbara Cornwall (m. 1963; died 2019)
- Website: www.lyssarides.com

Vassos Lyssarides (Greek: Βάσος Λυσσαρίδης; 13 May 1920 – 26 April 2021) was a Cypriot politician and physician who was a central figure in the politics of Cyprus after the island's independence.

== Biography ==
Lyssarides was born in 1920 in the village of Pano Lefkara. He studied medicine at the National and Kapodistrian University of Athens and worked as a physician. He was closely associated with Archbishop Makarios III, and was his personal physician for years.

== Political career ==
During his studies, he served as president of the Pan-student Committee for the Cypriot Struggle. The committee organised mass events for the union of Cyprus with Greece. He was also president of the Student Union of Cypriots and secretary of the Coordinating Committee of Cypriot Associations. Subsequently, Vassos Lyssarides participated in the EOKA 1955–1959 struggle. Lyssarides persuaded Georgios Grivas to create within EOKA the "Organisation of Left Patriots", through which they could attract members of the Cypriot Left to the struggle.

Lyssarides' active participation in the EOKA struggle and his collaboration with Grivas against the British led to his expulsion from AKEL, of which he was a member: in its decision to expel him, AKEL accused him of being "the leader of the factionalist spiral" and "an element who deservedly plays the role of an agent of Intelligence Services". Lyssarides himself later said "the [EOKA] organization, despite what is said, was not ideological in character. I participated with my ideology in full harmony, I never had a problem." He was a member of the Greek Cypriot delegation to London in 1959, representing EOKA, where the independence of Cyprus was decided. Along with Tassos Papadopoulos, he voted against the London and Zürich Agreements, "stressing that they legitimise Turkey's military-political presence and lead to deadlocks which will be exploited by Great Britain and Turkey."

In November 1964, Lyssarides and Papadopoulos organised the visit of Andreas Papandreou (son of then-Greek Prime Minister Georgios Papandreou) to Cyprus. During the visit, a very close friendship developed between Papandreou and Archbishop Makarios. Later, after the imposition of the military junta in Greece, Lyssarides was instrumental in assisting Papandreou and his Panhellenic Liberation Movement (PAK) with arms, money and training.

During the junta period, he was closely associated with the Panhellenic Liberation Movement (P.A.K.) and Andreas Papandreou, whose loyal friend he remained until the end. According to the testimony of the leading member of the P.A.K. Kostas Tsima, it was Vassos Lyssarides who "opened the doors" of the Arabs for the P.A.K., and through his mediation the Palestinians and Yasser Arafat helped the P.A.C. and Andreas Papandreou with money, weapons and training. Previously, in 1964, Lyssarides together with Papadopoulos had organised Andreas Papandreou's visit to Cyprus, where the friendship and cooperation between Papandreou and Makarios was born.

In 1969, he founded EDEK, the first socialist political party in Cyprus. He was repeatedly elected president of the party until 2002. EDEK's appeal was "strongest among non-communist leftists, intellectuals, and white-collar workers." In July 2001, he stepped down as president of the party and became its honorary president in 2002.

In 1974, he resisted the coup of 15 July 1974. On 30 August 1974, he was the target of an assassination attempt, during which the organisational secretary of the EDEK youth, Doros Loizou, was killed.

=== Member and president of the House of Representatives ===
Lyssarides was elected for the first time as a deputy in the first parliamentary elections of Cyprus, in the Nicosia Electoral District with the Patriotic Front for the first parliamentary term. He was re-elected as a deputy in the 1970, 1976, 1981 and 1985 parliamentary elections. On 30 December 1985, he was elected President of the House of Representatives for the fifth parliamentary term. His candidacy was supported by members of the EDEK and Democratic Party.

Subsequently, he was re-elected to the position of MP in the 1991, 1996., and 2001 parliamentary elections In the 2006 election he decided not to run. As an MP, he served as a member of the Selection Committee and the ad hoc Parliamentary Committee on the Rules of Procedure of the Parliament.

=== Presidential elections ===
Lyssarides was a candidate in the 1983, 1988 and 1998 presidential elections, supported mainly by his party, each time receiving in the region of 10% of the vote.

== Lyssarides' armed groups ==
Lyssarides acquired his own armed group in 1960. Lyssarides' men were armed under the care of Archbishop Makarios III himself, who trusted them completely. Lyssarides' armed men came mainly from the mountainous areas of the Nicosia District and wore red berets. Thus, they became known as Kokkinoskoufides. They were trained by Greek officers in the area of the Machairas Monastery. One of the training officers was the then captain Miltiadis Laskaris, later a lieutenant general and personal friend of Andreas Papandreou.

In the spring of 1963, as Makarios was preparing the 13-point plan (with the possibility of conflict in case the Turkish Cypriots did not accept it), Lyssarides met with the future dictator Georgios Papadopoulos, who visited Cyprus in his official capacity (branch chief of the 2nd Branch of Counterintelligence of the Greek KYP and organiser of the Cypriot KYP). In that meeting with Lyssarides, Papadopoulos pledged to send a new quantity of arms to reinforce the groups, which he did indeed send, through the Greek Cypriots, in July of the same year.

Lyssarides' Kokkinoskoufides were active in the 1963–64 and 1971–74 periods. In the first period, they fought in the intercommunal conflict against Turkish Cypriots and cleared the Pentadaktylos mountains of all armed Turkish Cypriots, led by Turkish officers. The clearing and occupation of Pentadaktylos was completed on 29 April 1964.

In 1971–74, Lyssarides' gunmen acted as defenders of Archbishop Makarios against EOKA B, which launched attacks on police stations, kidnappings, theft of weapons, etc. In cooperation with the Police Reserve Corps, they managed to significantly reduce the activities of EOKA B. After the coup on 15 July 1974, Lyssarides' groups took to the streets and became the most important source of resistance along with the Presidential Guard and the Reserve Corps, paying a heavy price in blood.

== Views on the Cyprus problem ==
Lyssarides had a hard-line stance on the Cyprus problem and strongly opposed a possible "bi-zonal and bi-communal federation" as a basis for negotiations, describing such a federation as the very definition of racism; he also argued for the termination of British sovereign rights on the island and the eviction of British military bases, unless the British started taking a more pro-Greek role in the dispute.

== Social activities ==
Lyssarides served as president of the Pancyprian Medical Association and the Hippocrates Medical Association, of which he was honorary president. In addition, he served as vice-president of the Afro-Asian Solidarity Organization (AA.P.S.O.) and secretary general of the International Committee Against Racial Discrimination, Racism and Colonialism.

== Awards ==
In 1996, he was awarded an honorary doctorate from Panteion University. He was awarded the medal of respitory in 1999. In addition, he was awarded the Supreme Honorary Distinction of the Palestinian Authority by Yasser Arafat in 2002. He was also made an honorary citizen of several municipalities in Greece.

== Personal life and death ==
He was married to Barbara Cornwall from 1963 until she died aged 86 in 2019. Lyssarides died in 2021 shortly before his 101st birthday.
