= Timeline of Cypriot history =

This is a timeline of Cypriot history, comprising important legal and territorial changes and political events in Cyprus. To read about the background to these events, see History of Cyprus. See also the list of presidents of Cyprus.

== Epipaleolithic and Neolithic periods (up to circa 3,800 BCE) ==
Year	Date	Event
12000–11000 BCE		The earliest site of putative human activity on Cyprus is Aetokremnos, situated on the south coast. Fossilised animal remains and lithic tools indicate that seasonal hunter-gatherers were active on the island from around 12,000 BC.
12000–11000 BCE		Extinction of the endemic to Cyprus pigmy hippos and pigmy elephants, likely due to human presence.
9500–8800 BCE		The first permanent settlements are formed in Asprokremnos, Klimonas and Roudias, founded by Pre-Pottery Neolithic populations who also introduced dog, sheep, goats, cattle, pigs, foxes, and deer to the island. Klimonas is to date the oldest known farming village in the world.
8700–7000 BCE		A second phase of early migration is thought to have occurred between 8700 and 7000 BCE, with settlements at Akanthou, Mylouthkia, Shillourokambos, and Tenta. DNA data obtained from three individuals whose fragmentary remains were found in a Neolithic disused and filled-in water well at Kissonerga-Mylouthkia, revealed high Anatolian-related ancestry.
8700–7000 BCE		Water wells discovered in western Cyprus are believed to be among the oldest in the world, dated at 9,000 to 10,500 years old.
8700–7000 BCE		Remains of an 8-month-old cat buried with a human body were discovered at Shillourokambos. The grave is estimated to be 9,500 years old, predating ancient Egyptian civilisation and pushing back the earliest known feline-human association.
7000 BCE		The Neolithic village of Khirokitia (a UNESCO World Heritage Site) is founded.
6000 BCE		The village of Khirokitia is suddenly abandoned for unknown reasons. The island appears to have remained uninhabited for about 1500 years, until the next phase of settlement that gave rise to the Sotira culture.
4600 BCE		Second phase of Khirokitia settlement by Pottery Neolithic farmers from Anatolia or the Levant.
3800 BCE		Large earthquake hits Cyprus and heralds the end of the Neolithic culture on the island.

== 36th century BCE ==
Year	Date	Event
3500 BCE		First signs of metalwork on the island marking the beginning of the Chalcolithic period.

== 37th–26th centuries BCE ==
Year	Date	Event
3600–2600 BCE		Socio-cultural continuity with the previous period and increase of settlements on the island. The chalcolithic population of Cyprus continues to use stone, but now in combination with copper for objects like chisels, hooks and jewellery. Female fertility and cruciform figurines, as well as Red-on-White pottery, predominate.

== 25th century BCE ==
Year	Date	Event
2450 BCE		Transition from the Chalcolithic to the Bronze Age and emergence of the Philia culture following further migrations from Anatolia. Metallurgy, cattle, donkey and woolly sheep are introduced on the island. A new form of distinctive pottery, Red Polished Ware, and other intrusive elements appear in archaeological data and material culture.

== 23rd–17th centuries BCE ==
Year	Date	Event
2250–1700 BCE		Continuity with Philia characterised mostly by peaceful development. Bidirectional trading contacts with Minoan Crete and the Levant develop.

== 16th century BCE ==
Year	Date	Event
1600 BCE		Exploitation of copper, urbanization and foundation of Enkomi, the first industrial centre in Cyprus.
1600 BCE		Trading contacts between Cyprus and Egypt suggested by Egyptian artefacts from the Hyksos period found in Cyprus.
1550 BCE		Literacy is introduced on the island with the Cypro-Minoan syllabary, first attested in Enkomi.
1550 BCE		Destruction of the Hyksos Kingdom by Ahmose I leads to a breakdown of political and economic bonds between Cyprus and Hyksos. An incomplete weathered cartouche dating to the early XVIIIth Dynasty of Egypt found in Cyprus may be indicative of a new era of connections with the outside world.

== 15th century BCE ==
Year	Date	Event
1446 BCE		Thutmose III extends his influence over Cyprus under the name of "Isy" or "Irs" (probably referring to Alasiya), which is reported offering minerals and timber as a tribute to the Pharaoh.

== 14th century BCE ==
Year	Date	Event
ca 1300 BCE		Close trading contacts between Cyprus and the Aegean develop, attested by the import of luxury Aegean items and "Aegeanization" of Cypriote craftmanship. Mycenaean traders start visiting the island and establishing stations for the exportation of copper.

== 13th century BCE ==
Year	Date	Event
ca 1200 BCE		The first documented name of a Cypriote king, Kushmeshusha, is attested in letters sent to Ugarit from Alasiya (Cyprus) sometime in the 13th c. BCE.
1220 BCE		Tudhaliya IV annexes Cyprus (disputed).
1210 BCE		The last king of the Hittites, Šuppiluliuma II, wins a decisive naval battle against Alashiya (Cypriots) off the coast of Cyprus, in the first recorded naval battle in history.

== 12th century BCE ==
Year	Date	Event
1190–1180 BCE		Invasion by the Sea Peoples.
1179 BCE		Migrations of Aegean populations to Cyprus attested by abundant locally produced Mycenaean-style (IIIC:1b) pottery and other Aegean/European features. The Hellenization process of the island begins.

== 11th century BCE ==
Year	Date	Event
1150–1050 BCE		A second, major wave of Greek settlements takes place following the Bronze Age collapse of Mycenaean Greece, accompanied by the appearance of further Aegean features including long dromoi graves and the introduction of the Greek language.
1100 BCE		Appearance of the Cypriot syllabary, used both for Arcadocypriot Greek and Eteocypriot. The script, which had evolved from the pre-existing Cypro-Minoan syllabary, lasted until the end of the 3rd Century BCE when it was eventually replaced by the Greek alphabet.
1050 BCE		Foundation of the city-kingdom of Amathus, the last autochthonous urban centre in Iron Age Cyprus where the Eteocypriot language survived until about 400 BCE.
1050 BCE		Emergence of the City States, which would eventually come to be known as the Ten City-Kingdoms of Cyprus.

== 10th century BCE ==
Year	Date	Event
ca 1000 BCE		Literary evidence of Phoenician presence at Kition under Tyrian rule.

== 9th century BCE ==
Year	Date	Event
850 BCE		The royal tombs in the city of Salamis are built.
800 BCE		Phoenician merchants settle in Kition.

== 8th century BC ==
Year	Date	Event
709 BCE		The kingdoms of Cyprus are subjugated by the Neo-Assyrian Empire, although no evidence of occupation is apparent in archaeological data and material culture; rather, the kingdoms seem to have "offered their submission to Sargon II" and had a client-state relationship.

== 7th century BCE ==
Year	Date	Event
631 BCE		Cyprus is no longer mentioned in Assyrian records after the death of King Ashurbanipal of Assyria.

== 6th century BCE ==
Year	Date	Event
570 BCE		Cyprus is conquered by the Egyptians under Amasis II.
545 BCE		Cyprus pledged allegiance to the Achaemenid Empire.
526 BCE		Amasis II dies. His son Psammetichus III succeeds him as pharaoh.
525 BCE		The kingdoms of Cyprus gave naval support to Cambyses II of the Achaemenid Persian Empire in anticipation of his invasion of Egypt.
525 BCE		Battle of Pelusium (525 BCE): The Persian army defeat the Egyptian army at Pelusium.

== 5th century BCE ==
Year	Date	Event
499 BCE		Ionian Revolt: Aristagoras, the appointed tyrant of Miletus, rebells against Persian rule.
499 BCE		Ionian Revolt: With the support of Athens and Eretria, Aristagoras captures Sardis, the capital of the Persian satrapy of Lydia.
498 BCE		Ionian Revolt: The kingdoms of Cyprus joined the revolt except the Kingdom of Amathus.
497 BCE		Ionian Revolt: The Cypriot rebels besieged the pro-Persian Kingdom of Amathus.
497 BCE		Ionian Revolt: The Persian army reestablished control over Cyprus.
451 BCE		The Athenian expedition in Cyprus under the command of Cimon besieged the city of Kition, but later retreated to Salamis.
450 BCE		The Athenians in Salamis defeated an attacking Persian forces and retreated from Cyprus.
450 BCE		Kition increases in importance and annexes Idalion.
450 BCE		Phoenician rulers establish themselves in Salamis.
411 BCE		The Teucrid Evagoras I regains the throne of Salamis.

== 4th century BCE ==
Year	Date	Event
391 BCE		Evagoras attempts to establish himself as an independent ruler on Cyprus with Athenian help.
386 BCE		Under the Treaty of Antakidas, Persian rule over Cyprus is accepted by Athens.
376 BCE		Cyprus became a de facto Persian vassal after a peace treaty was concluded between King Evagoras I of Cyprus and Persia.
350 BCE		A Cypriot rebellion begins.
344 BCE		The Cypriot rebellion is crushed by Artaxerxes III.
333 BCE		The island is finally liberated from Persian rule by Alexander the Great.
332 BCE		Pythagoras of Salamis and other Cypriot kings plea to Alexander The Great during the beginning of the siege of Tyre.
332 BCE		The siege of Tyre ends.
331 BCE		The rule of Nicocreon begins.
325 BCE		The Archaic and Classical Period ends.
310 BCE		The rule of Nicocreon ends.
310 BCE		Menelaos is made satrap of Cyprus.
306 BCE		The reign of Menelaos ends.
306 BCE		Antigonus begins his rule.
301 BCE		The reign of Antigonus ends.
301 BCE		The Ptolemaic Lagid Dynasty begins.

== 3rd century BCE ==
Year	Date	Event
ca 300 BCE		The prominent Cypriot philosopher, Zenon of Kitium, becomes the founder of the Stoic school of philosophy in Athens in the early 3rd century BCE.
245 BCE		Kingdoms are abolished under the Ptolemaic rule. Greek alphabet and koine Greek are established as the official administrative tools. Both the Eteocypriot and Phoenician languages become extinct and the island is thereafter fully Hellenised.

== 2nd century BCE ==
Year	Date	Event
116 BCE		Cleopatra sends her son Ptolemy Philometor to Cyprus.
109 BCE		Cleopatra sends Alexander, her son and the brother of Ptolemy IX Lathyros, to Cyprus.
107 BCE		Alexander returns from Cyprus and becomes king of Egypt. Ptolemy campaigns in Palestine.

== 1st century BCE ==
Year	Date	Event
58 BCE		Cyprus becomes a Roman province.
43 BCE		Cyprus is placed under the rule of Cleopatra VII, with its governor being Serapion. However, Serapion defected against Cleopatra.
41 BCE		Ptolemaic rule in Cyprus was restored after Serapion was captured and executed under orders from Cleopatra VII.
30 BCE		The Ptolemaic Lagid Dynasty ends and Cyprus returns to Roman rule.

== 1st century ==
Year	Date	Event
45		Apostle Paul, St. Barnabas and St. Mark introduced Christianity in Cyprus and converted the Roman governor Sergius Paulus.

== 2nd century ==
Year	Date	Event
115		Kitos War: A messianic Jewish revolt begins, which results in the massacre of 240,000 Greeks in Cyprus. Trajan intervenes to restore the peace and expels the Jews from Cyprus.
116		Kitos War: The revolt ends.

== 4th century ==
Year	Date	Event
335		The revolt of the usurper Calocaerus is suppressed by Flavius Dalmatius.
350		Salamis is rebuilt by Constantius II, the son of Constantine, after being destroyed by earthquakes and renamed Constantia.
395		Cyprus becomes part of the Byzantine Empire.

== 5th century ==
Year	Date	Event
431		The Church of Cyprus achieves its independence from the Patriarch of Antioch at the First Council of Ephesus.

== 7th century ==
Year	Date	Event
649		The Arabs under Mu'awiya invade and occupy Cyprus.
683		The Arab garrison is withdrawn after its defeat at the hands of Constantine IV.
688		Emperor Justinian II and Caliph Abd al-Malik ibn Marwan sign a treaty under whose terms no garrisons are to be stationed on the island, and all taxes collected are to be divided between the Arabs and the Emperor.

== 10th century ==
Year	Date	Event
965		Byzantine rule is restored on the island by Nicepheros Phokas.

== 12th century ==
Year	Date	Event
1185		Cyprus becomes an independent Empire under the reign of Isaak Comnenus.
1192		The reign of Isaac Komnenos comes to an end after the island's ruler refuses to release prisoners and treasure captured from three English ship wrecks on their way to Acre, and Richard I conquers Cyprus. The island is then sold to the Templar Order, who in turn sell it to Guy of Lusignan of the House of Lusignan.
1192		Guy of Lusignan and his descendants begin their rule of the island as an independent kingdom, known as the Kingdom of Cyprus.
1193		Altheides of Cyprus, the traveling philosopher, is born.

== 14th century ==
Year	Date	Event
1347		Black Death hits Cyprus and wipes out one fifth to one third of its population.
1361		Antalya and Corycus in Anatolia are briefly annexed by the Kingdom of Cyprus.

== 15th century ==
Year	Date	Event
1474		Catherine Cornaro becomes the last monarch of the Kingdom of Cyprus, succeeding James II.
1489	February	The Venetian government forces Catherine to cede her rights over Cyprus because she had no heir. The rule of the Lusignan dynasty comes to an end after nearly three centuries.
1489		Cyprus becomes an overseas colony of the Venetian Republic.
1489	9 June	Ottoman Turks raid the Karpasia Peninsula.

== 16th century ==
Year	Date	Event
1539		Ottoman Turks attack Limassol.
1570	1 July	Ottoman Turks invade Cyprus with 80,000 men.
1570	25 July	Ottoman army besieges Nicosia.
1570	9 September	Nicosia falls to the Turkish invaders. 20,000 Nicosians, Greek and Latin, are killed in the aftermath. About 1,000 survivors are bound and shipped out to be sold in the Constantinople slave markets.
1571		Having been under siege since the previous year, Famagusta also falls to the Ottomans marking the end of the Venetian rule. Most Christians still remaining in the city are massacred and the Venetian commander Marco Antonio Bragadin is tortured, mutilated and flayed alive.
1571		Cyprus is now subjected to Ottoman rule. The first Ottoman settlers arrive on the island.
1572		A period of Ottoman occupation of the island begins, during which twenty-eight bloody uprisings will occur.

== 18th century ==
Year	Date	Event
1788		The Chronological History of the island of Cyprus, later described as "the only scholarly monograph of modern Greek literature since the fall of Constantinople", is published by Kyprianos Kouriokourineos, one of the most prominent Greek-Cypriot intellectuals and clerics of the 18th century.

== 19th century ==
Year	Date	Event
1821	25 March	The Cypriots sided with Greece in a revolt against Ottoman rule. The island's leading churchmen and notables were executed as punishment. 20,000 Christians fled the island.
1869		The Suez Canal opened.
1878	12 July	British occupation began. The British took over the administration of the island, by mutual agreement, in order to protect their sea route to India via the Suez Canal. In exchange, Britain agreed to help the Ottoman Empire against future Russian attacks.
1878	22 July	Sir Garnet Joseph Wolseley became Crown commissioner.
1879		Sir Robert Biddulph became Crown commissioner.
1886		Sir Henry Ernest Bulwer became Crown commissioner.
1892		Sir Walter Sendall became Crown commissioner.
1898		Sir William Frederick Haynes-Smith became Crown commissioner.

== 20th century ==
Year	Date	Event
1904		Sir Charles King-Harman became Crown commissioner.
1911		Sir Hamilton Goold-Adams became Crown commissioner.
1914		Britain annexed Cyprus in response to Turkey's alliance with Germany and Austro-Hungary in World War I.
1915		Sir John Eugene Clauson became Crown commissioner.
1920		Sir Malcolm Stevenson became Crown commissioner.
1925		Cyprus became a British Crown Colony. Sir Malcolm Stevenson was made governor.
1926		Sir Ronald Storrs became governor.
1931		Greek Cypriots demanding Enosis (the union with Greece) instigated their first serious riots. The government-house in Nicosia was burned down; martial law was declared afterwards and the legislative council was abolished. The Greek National Anthem and the display of the Greek flag were banned. The British invented the terms "Greek Cypriot" and "Turkish Cypriot" and used the latter against the "Greek Cypriots" so as to cease Enosis demands.
1932		Sir Reginald Edward Stubbs became governor.
1933		Sir Herbert Richmond Palmer became governor.
1939		Cypriots fought along with the British in World War II, Greek Cypriots demanding Enosis at war's end. The Turkish Cypriots wanted British rule to continue.
1939		Sir William Denis Battershill became governor.
1941		Sir Charles Campbell Woolley became governor.
1946		The British Government began to imprison thousands of displaced Jews in camps on Cyprus.
1946		Sir Reginald Fletcher, Lord Winster, became governor.
1949		The British Government finished imprisoning displaced Jews.
1949		Sir Andrew Barkworth Wright became governor.
1950		Archbishop Makarios III was elected the political and spiritual leader of Cyprus, the head of the autocephalous Cypriot Orthodox Church and leader of the campaign for Enosis with the support of Greece.
1954		Sir Robert Perceval Armitage became governor.
1954	28 July	Minister of State for the Colonies, Henry Hopkinson, says that there were certain territories in the Commonwealth 'which, owing to their particular circumstances, can never expect to be fully independent'.
1955		Sir John Harding became governor.
1955	1 April	Cyprus Emergency: A series of bomb attacks marked the start of a violent campaign for Enosis by the National Organisation of Cypriot Fighters (EOKA) under George Grivas, a Cypriot ex-colonel in the Greek army. Grivas took the name Dighenis and conducted guerrilla warfare from a secret hideout in the Troodos Mountains.
1956		Britain deported Makarios to the Seychelles in an attempt to quell the revolt.
1957		Field Marshal Sir John Harding was replaced by the civilian governor Sir Hugh Foot in a conciliatory move.
1958	27 January	First of 2 days of serious rioting by Turkish Cypriots. Seven were killed by British security forces.
1958	7 June	Turkish press office in Nicosia is bombed. Inter-communal clashes as Turkish Cypriots invade Greek sector. On 26 June 1984 the Turkish Cypriot leader, Rauf Denktaş, admitted on British channel ITV that the bomb was placed by the Turks themselves in order to create tension. On 9 January 1995 Rauf Denktaş repeated his claim in the Turkish newspaper, Milliyet.
1958	12 June	The first massacre between Greeks and Turks on Cyprus. British police released from arrest a group of 35 Greeks in the region of Guenyeli. A Turkish mob attacks the unarmed group, killing some of them.
1959	11-19 February	London and Zürich Agreements started with an agreement on 19 February 1959 in Lancaster House, London, between Turkey, Greece, the United Kingdom and Cypriot community leaders. On that basis, a constitution was drafted and agreed together with two prior Treaties of Alliance and Guarantee in Zürich on 11 February 1959.
1959	18 October	British minesweeper HMS Burmaston intercepts the Turkish registered boat, Deniz. Loaded with weaponry, the boat is scuttled by its 3-member crew. The crew, all Turkish nationals, are arrested for importing munitions without a permit.
1959	28 October	Archbishop Makarios III and Dr. Fazıl Küçük appeal to their respective communities to hand over illegal weapons.
1959	15 November	Deadline to hand over illegal weapons.
1960		British occupation ended.
1960		The British, Greek and Turkish governments signed a Treaty of Guarantee to provide for an independent Cypriot state within the Commonwealth of Nations and allow for the retention of two Sovereign Base Areas at Akrotiri and Dhekelia. Under the treaty, each power received the right to take military action in the face of any threat to the constitution. Cyprus became independent of foreign rule. The Greek Cypriot Archbishop Makarios became the first president, with Turkish Cypriot Dr. Kutchuk his vice president. Both had the right of veto. Turkish Cypriots, who formed 18% of the population, were guaranteed the vice-presidency, three out of ten ministerial posts and 30% of jobs in the public service. They were further guaranteed 40% representation in the army and separate municipal services in the five major towns. Overall, a very complex constitution was drafted, which demanded a majority of votes overall as well as within each community for many decisions.
1963		Greek Cypriots began to view the constitution as unworkable and proposed changes abolishing all veto rights and many ethnic clauses; these proposals were rejected by Turkish Cypriots and the Turkish government. Inter-communal fighting erupted. Tylliria was bombarded with napalm bombs. A UN Peace Keeping Force was sent in, but soon proved powerless to prevent incidents. Thousands of Turkish Cypriots retreated into enclaves where they were embargoed by the Greek Cypriots. The UN attempted to supply them with food and medicine. Akritas plan
1964		The Battle of Tylliria takes place. Greek-Cypriot forces storm the Turkish-held Kokkina enclave, prompting a Turkish military intervention and airstrikes on the Greek forces. However, Soviet pressure prevented the Turks from going any further, and when the battle ended after four days of fierce fighting, the Kokkina enclave had been reduced to 50-40% of its original size.
1971		EOKA B' is being created
1973		The Turks emerged from their enclaves.
1974		Turkish invasion of Cyprus
1975		Turks announced a Federate State in the north, with Rauf Denktaş as leader. UN Forces remained as buffer between the two zones.
1977		Makarios died. He was succeeded by Spyros Kyprianou.
1983		The Turkish Federated State declared itself the independent Turkish Republic of Northern Cyprus (TRNC), with Denktaş as president. The new state was not recognised by any country except Turkey and was officially boycotted.
1992		UN sponsored talks began between the two sides.
1995		The UN talks ran into the sand, but with a commitment to resume.

== 21st century ==
Year	Date	Event
2001		The European Court of Human Rights found Turkey guilty of continuing human rights violations against the Greek Cypriots.
2003		Cyprus was set to join the European Union in May 2004. Renewed negotiations about the status of the island took place.
2003	23 April	The line which divided the two parts of Cyprus was partly opened. Thousands of Turkish and Greek Cypriots crossed the buffer zone to the "other side" after 30 years.
2004	24 April	2004 Annan Plan Referendum: The Annan Plan was accepted by the majority of Turkish Cypriots but overwhelmingly rejected by the Greek Cypriots.
2004	1 May	The sovereign Republic of Cyprus joined the European Union, however the EU acquis was suspended in the occupied north, Akrotiri and Dhekelia and the United Nations Buffer Zone.
2008		Demetris Christofias replaced Tassos Papadopoulos as president of the Republic of Cyprus. It was the first time that a leader of the Greek Cypriot communist party, AKEL, had entered the presidential race. He was at the time the only communist leader in the European Union.

== See also ==
- Timeline of Nicosia history
