= 2021 in Cyprus =

- Decades: 2000s; 2010s; 2020s
- See also: Other events of 2021; Timeline of Cypriot history

Events in the year 2021 in Cyprus.

== Incumbents ==
- President: Nicos Anastasiades
- President of the Parliament: Adamos Adamou (until 10 June), Annita Demetriou (starting 10 June)

== Events ==
Ongoing — COVID-19 pandemic in Cyprus and Cyprus dispute

- 12 January – At an overcrowded migrant camp housing 1,500 people, 600 of whom are in quarantine for COVID-19, 25 people are injured in a fight.
- 3 July – During a week-long heat wave that sees temperatures surpass 40 °C (104 °F), wildfires break out in Limassol District, leading to the deaths of four Egyptian men before being put out two days later with assistance from Greece, Israel, Italy, and the United Kingdom.

== Deaths ==
- 3 January – Michalakis Leptos (born c. 1936), property developer.
- 26 April – Vassos Lyssarides (born 1920), politician, president of the House of Representatives (1985–1991) and founder of EDEK.

== See also ==
- 2021 in the European Union
- Northern Cyprus
