= 2026 in Cyprus =

- Decades: 2000s; 2010s; 2020s
- See also: Other events of 2026; Timeline of Cypriot history

Events in the year 2026 in Cyprus.

== Incumbents ==
- President: Nikos Christodoulides
- President of the Parliament: Annita Demetriou

== Events ==
Ongoing: Cyprus dispute

=== January ===
- 1 January – Cyprus takes over the Presidency of the Council of the European Union.
- 12 January – Charalambos Charalambous resigns as director of the office of president Nikos Christodoulides amid allegations of the former using his position to earn favors for would-be investors in exchange for cash.

=== March ===
- 1 March – In retaliation for the 2026 Israeli–United States strikes on Iran, Iran launches two ballistic missiles towards Cyprus, not far from the British military bases in Akrotiri and Dhekelia. Both are intercepted before reaching the island.
- 2 March – Paphos International Airport is evacuated after a "drone threat", while Greece deploys two frigates and F-16 fighter jets to Cyprus amid rising tensions.
- 3 March – British prime minister Keir Starmer says he has approved the deployment of Royal Navy warship HMS Dragon to Cyprus to protect Akrotiri and Dhekelia from further Iranian attacks.
- 5 March –
  - The Italian Ministry of Defence states that Italy is to dispatch naval assets to Cyprus. The Royal Netherlands Navy is also joining the European naval task force.
  - Spain announces that the frigate Cristóbal Colón will join the French aircraft carrier Charles de Gaulle and Greek Navy ships to protect Cyprus.
- 10 March – British warship HMS Dragon leaves Portsmouth and heads to Cyprus in response to the drone strike on the RAF Akrotiri base.

=== May ===
- 24 May – 2026 Cypriot legislative election: The Democratic Rally wins a plurality of 17 seats in the House of Representatives.

=== June ===
- 4 June – Annita Demetriou is reelected as president of the House of Representatives.

=== August ===
- 30 August – The passenger ferry Filo Jet, sailing from Kyrenia to the Turkish port of Taşucu, capsizes off northern Cyprus, killing 27 people.

=== October ===
- 15 October – The Hadassah Medical Center inaugurates its new medical center in Limassol.
- 26 October – Israel agrees to provide an offshore patrol vessel to Cyprus.

=== November ===
- 6 November – After a Wizz Air flight from Prague to Larnaca receives a mid-air bomb threat, Hungarian Air Force fighter jets are deployed for an emergency intercept and escort, disrupting air traffic to the island.
- 14 November – Cyprus signs the instruments of accession to the Treaty of Amity and Cooperation in Southeast Asia by ASEAN.

=== Predicted and scheduled events ===
- 6 December – 2026 Northern Cypriot parliamentary election

== Holidays ==
- 1 January – New Year's Day
- 6 January – Epiphany
- 23 February – Clean Monday
- 25 March – Greek Independence Day
- 1 April – Cyprus National Day
- 10 April – Orthodox Good Friday
- 12 April – Orthodox Easter Sunday
- 13 April – Orthodox Easter Monday
- 1 May – Labour Day
- 1 June – Orthodox Whit Monday
- 15 August – Assumption Day
- 1 October – Cyprus Independence Day
- 28 October – Greek National Anniversary Day
- 24 December – Christmas Eve
- 25 December – Christmas Day
- 26 December – Boxing Day

== Deaths ==
- 13 January – George Vassiliou, 94, president (1988–1993) and MP (1996–2001)
- 29 January – Georghios Pikis, 87, president of the Supreme Court (1995–2004) and judge of the International Criminal Court (2003–2009)
- 28 June – Sevgül Uludağ, 68, journalist and activist
- 5 October – Benon Sevan, 88, diplomat, assistant secretary-general in the UN Department of Political Affairs (1992–2005).

== See also ==
- 2026 in the European Union
- 2026 in Europe
