= 2025 in Cyprus =

- Decades: 2000s; 2010s; 2020s
- See also: Other events of 2025; Timeline of Cypriot history

Events in the year 2025 in Cyprus.

== Incumbents ==
- President: Nikos Christodoulides
- President of the Parliament: Annita Demetriou

== Events ==
=== Ongoing ===
- Cyprus dispute

=== February ===
- 17 February – Cyprus, Egypt and a joint consortium by Eni and TotalEnergies sign an agreement allowing for the export of natural gas from the Cronos Gas Field in the Cypriot offshore economic zone to Europe via processing facilities in Egypt.
- 27 February – The European Court of Human Rights rules that Cypriot authorities failed to conduct a proper investigation into the 2019 Cyprus rape allegation case.

=== March ===
- 31 March – Five Israelis are acquitted by the Famagusta criminal court over the 2019 Cyprus rape allegation case.

=== April ===
- 3 April – The House of Representatives passes a law allowing women to volunteer for service in the Cypriot National Guard.

=== June ===
- 21 June – A British national is arrested on suspicion of spying on the RAF Akrotiri base on behalf of Iran.

=== July ===
- 8 July – The government announces the discovery of a major natural gas deposit at the Pegasus-1 well off the southwestern Cypriot coast.
- 23 July – Two people are killed in a wildfire along the Monagri-Alassa road in the Troodos Mountains.

=== August ===
- 27 August–14 September – EuroBasket 2025 in Cyprus, Finland, Latvia and Poland

=== October ===
- 19 October – 2025 Northern Cypriot presidential election: Former prime minister Tufan Erhürman defeats incumbent president Ersin Tatar with 62.76% of the vote.

=== November ===
- 12 November – A magnitude 5.3 earthquake hits Paphos District, damaging several buildings.
- 26 November – Lebanon and Cyprus sign a final agreement to demarcate their common maritime border.

== Holidays ==
- 1 January – New Year's Day
- 6 January – Epiphany
- 18 March – Clean Monday
- 25 March – Greek Independence Day
- 1 April – Cyprus National Day
- 18 April – Orthodox Good Friday
- 20 April – Orthodox Easter Sunday
- 21 April – Orthodox Easter Monday
- 1 May – Labour Day
- 9 June – Orthodox Whit Monday
- 15 August – Assumption Day
- 1 October – Cyprus Independence Day
- 28 October – Greek National Anniversary Day
- 24 December – Christmas Eve
- 25 December – Christmas Day
- 26 December – Boxing Day

== Deaths ==
- 20 December – Henry Moore, 102, British-born Anglican clergyman, bishop of Cyprus and the Gulf (1981–1986)

== See also ==
- 2025 in the European Union
- 2025 in Europe
