= 2022 in Cyprus =

- Decades: 2000s; 2010s; 2020s
- See also: Other events of 2022; Timeline of Cypriot history

Events in the year 2022 in Cyprus.

== Incumbents ==
- President: Nicos Anastasiades
- President of the Parliament: Annita Demetriou

== Events ==
Ongoing — COVID-19 pandemic in Cyprus and Cyprus dispute

- 4 January – Cyprus reports a record 5,457 new cases of COVID-19 in the past 24 hours, thereby bringing the nationwide total of confirmed cases to 183,178.
- 8 January - A Cypriot scientist reportedly detects a variant of the SARS-CoV-2 called "Deltacron", which combines genomes found in the SARS-CoV-2 Delta variant and genetic signatures found in the SARS-CoV-2 Omicron variant.
- 11 January - A magnitude 6.6 earthquake strikes west of Cyprus.
- 5 March - Cyprus denies access for five Russian military vessels to enter its port in Limassol. Whether the military ships could enter Cypriot ports in the first place is controversial, as the international law background is unclear.
- 7 April - Cyprus lifts COVID-19-related travel conditions from April 18, ending rules of two years of the pandemic.
- 8 June - Cyprus report their first suspected cases of monkeypox.
- 7 July - The Cypriot House of Representatives approves the seventeenth amendment to the Constitution of Cyprus, which involves a reform of the judiciary, the recovery of the Supreme Constitutional Court of Cyprus and the creation of the Court of Appeal of Cyprus.

== Deaths ==
- 11 January – Dinos Hadjinicolas, (b 1955), politician.
- 9 April - Lellos Demetriades, (b 1933), politician.
- 6 July - Zeta Emilianidou, (b 1954), lawyer and politician.

== See also ==
- Northern Cyprus
