= 2020 in Cyprus =

- Decades: 2000s; 2010s; 2020s
- See also: Other events of 2020; Timeline of Cypriot history

Events in the year 2020 in Cyprus

== Incumbents ==
- President: Nicos Anastasiades
- President of the Parliament: Demetris Syllouris (until 15 October), Adamos Adamou (starting 23 October)

== Events ==
Ongoing — COVID-19 pandemic in Cyprus and Cyprus dispute

=== February ===
- 28 February – The government announces that four of the country's checkpoints along its border with Northern Cyprus will be closed due to concerns over COVID-19. This is the first time the border points have been closed since 2003.

=== March ===
- 9 March – The Minister of Health confirms the first two cases of COVID-19 on the island: a 64-year-old health professional who had visited U.K. and a 25-year-old man from Limassol who had traveled to Italy.
- 13 March – In a special televised appearance, President Nikos Anastasiadis announced that all of the country's border would be closed for 15 days to everyone except Cypriots, Europeans working on the island, and people with special permits. Authorities also extended a school shutdown until April 10 in a precautionary move against COVID-19.
- 21 March – The country reports its first COVID-19 death, that of an individual with underlying health issues.
- 23 March – President Nicos Anastasiades announces a nationwide lockdown between starting March 24 and ending April 13. The lockdown comes when the country has reported 116 coronavirus cases and one death.
- 27 March – The government announces that 50 prisoners will be released in early April. The prisoners were held in Nicosia central prison, which had been operating beyond capacity for years. The release is expected to alleviate the overcrowded prison and slow the spread of the virus.

=== May ===
- 21 May – The lockdown ended and repatriation flights continued, although those coming back to the country no longer have to be quarantined for two weeks. The government also announced that airports will reopen fully on June 9, though flights from countries heavily affected by the virus will not be permitted until further notice.
- 25 May – The government announces that it will deport 17 immigrants who are suspected of having links to extremist groups or involved in acts of terrorism. The immigrants, who are being held in a migrant detention facility, will leave the country once all COVID-19 restrictions are lifted according to the ministry.

=== August ===
- 24 August – The Cyprus Papers, consisting of more than 1,400 confidential approved applications relating to the government Cyprus Investment Programme, were published by Al Jazeera, which says they have been sold to criminals and fugitives from 70 countries who, by purchasing a Cypriot passport, become European Union citizens. The government claims that it has clamped down on the loopholes and that each accepted application was in conformity with the standards at the time. The country said it will revoke citizenship for individuals found guilty of serious crimes.
- 26 August – The Turkish Ministry of National Defense revealed that a Barbaros-class frigate of the Turkish Navy and the TCG Burgazada had conducted joint military exercises with the USS Winston S. Churchill of the U.S. Navy in the Eastern Mediterranean, hours after Greece conducted similar exercises with the country, France, and Italy in the disputed Aegean region.
- 28 August – Top EU diplomat Josep Borrell threatened Turkey with sanctions unless it and Greece reconcile their differences over maritime borders and gas drilling rights near the country.
- 31 August – French Foreign Minister Jean-Yves Le Drian called for a "coordinated European response" to recent Turkish aggression towards the country and Greece in the Eastern Mediterranean, saying "Europe needs to leave the age of innocence behind and shape its own destiny."

=== September ===
- 6 September – The Turkish Armed Forces launched joint military exercises with the Security Forces Command of Northern Cyprus amid ongoing territorial disputes involving the country in the eastern Mediterranean.
- 14 September – at least thirteen migrants and refugees from Lebanon and Syria die attempting to travel to Cyprus.
- 24 September – The Ministry of Foreign Affairs announced that it welcomes the agreement for the establishment of diplomatic relations between Bahrain and Israel. It added that this agreement constitutes another positive development for peace and stability in the region following a similar decision announced by Israel and the UAE a month before.

=== October ===
- 2 October – The European Council agreed on sanctions against Belarus after assuring the country, which had previously stopped the motion from passing, that Turkey would also be sanctioned if it continued oil and gas drilling in the disputed maritime regions.

== Deaths ==
- 12 February – Takis Evdokas, politician and psychiatrist, founder of the Democratic National Party (b. 1928).
- 23 April – Alecos Markides, lawyer and politician, former MP and Attorney General (b. 1943).

== See also ==
- List of years in Cyprus
- 2020 in Cyprus
- 2020 in Cypriot sport
