= Matsakis =

Matsakis is a Greek surname Ματσάκης. Notable people with the surname include:

- Manny Matsakis (born 1962), American football player and coach
- Marios Matsakis (born 1954), Greek-Cypriot doctor, coroner, forensic pathologist, and politician
