= 2024 in Cyprus =

- Decades: 2000s; 2010s; 2020s
- See also: Other events of 2024; Timeline of Cypriot history

Events in the year 2024 in Cyprus.

== Incumbents ==
- President: Nikos Christodoulides
- President of the Parliament: Annita Demetriou

== Events ==
=== Ongoing ===
- Cyprus dispute

=== April ===
- 14 April: Cyprus suspends Syrian asylum applications as it struggles with increasing refugee numbers.

=== June ===
- 9 June:
  - 2024 European Parliament election. The Democratic Rally and AKEL emerge as the largest parties in the Cypriot contingent to the European Parliament. YouTuber Fidias Panayiotou is also elected as an independent MEP.
  - 2024 Cypriot local elections
- 19 June – Hezbollah secretary general Hassan Nasrallah threatens Cyprus if it allows Israel to use its airports and bases for military exercises.

=== September ===
- 17 September – The government approves a plan to build a 1.9 billion-euro undersea electricity cable to link the country's electric grid with that of Greece.
- 18 September – The Supreme Court of Cyprus orders the dismissal of Odysseas Michaelides as the country's comptroller-general for improper behavior, following a case filed against him by Attorney-General George L. Savvides.
- 29 September – President Nikos Christodoulides orders the dismissal of Stylianos Papatheodorou as head of the Cyprus Police, along with his deputy, Demetris Demetriou and the acting head of the country's central prison following the escape of a convicted murderer.

=== October ===
- 3 October – The Hellenic Air Force evacuates Greek and Cypriot nationals from Beirut–Rafic Hariri International Airport in Lebanon.
- 8 October – The European Court of Human Rights rules that Cyprus had violated the human rights of two Syrian asylum seekers who were deliberately kept stranded at sea for two days by marine police before being expelled to Lebanon in 2020.
- 20 October – The government announces that it had thwarted an attempted cyberattack on its central online portal.

== Holidays ==
- 1 January - New Year's Day
- 6 January - Epiphany
- 18 March - Clean Monday
- 25 March - Greek Independence Day
- 1 April - Cyprus National Day
- 1 May - Labour Day
- 3 May - Orthodox Good Friday
- 5 May - Orthodox Easter Sunday
- 6 May - Orthodox Easter Monday
- 24 June - Orthodox Whit Monday
- 15 August - Assumption Day
- 1 October – Cyprus Independence Day
- 28 October - Greek National Anniversary Day
- 24 December - Christmas Eve
- 25 December - Christmas Day
- 26 December – Boxing Day

== See also ==
- 2024 in the European Union
- 2024 in Europe
