= 2019 Cyprus rape allegation case =

High-profile criminal case

2019 Cyprus rape allegation
- Location of Ayia Napa, Cyprus
- Location: 34°59′15″N 33°59′50″E; Ayia Napa, Cyprus
- Date: July 17, 2019
- Victim: Anonymous 19-year-old British woman
- No. of participants: 13
- Accused: 12
- Verdict: Briton was found guilty of public mischief, later overturned by the Supreme Court.
- Convicted: 1 Briton, later overturned

The 2019 Cyprus rape allegation case is a high-profile case of a reported gang rape in Cyprus. In July 2019, a 19-year old British woman on holiday in Ayia Napa reported she had been gang raped by twelve Israeli tourists. The Israeli men were subsequently arrested and investigated over the allegation by the Cyprus Police, but they were released without charge and the woman was charged for making a false allegation. In January 2020, the woman was convicted of "public mischief" in a Cypriot court and received a suspended sentence. Her conviction was overturned in 2022 by the Cypriot Supreme Court on the grounds that she had not received a fair trial. The woman has maintained that she was pressured to retract her allegations, something contested by Cypriot authorities. The case triggered intense international scrutiny.

== Alleged crime and police investigation ==
During the 2019 summer break, the 19-year old British woman had traveled to Pambos Napa Rocks resort in the Cypriot resort town of Ayia Napa on a working holiday organised by the British tourism company Summer Takeover. On 17 July 2019, the British woman filed a report with the Cyprus Police in Ayia Napa claiming that she had been raped by several Israeli youths in her hotel room. The following day, the Cypriot authorities arrested 12 Israeli youths, aged between 15 and 22 years, for eight days. The police investigation was led by Detective Sergeant Marios Christou. Police questioned the suspects and took DNA samples from all twelve. Police found five used condoms and thirteen condom wrappers in the room.

The woman was examined by Cypriot state pathologist Dr. Sophocles Sophocleus, who found no evidence of gang rape. He subsequently testified that he found a few light bruises on her thighs and scratches on her legs but in his opinion, they were not consistent with gang rape. He also examined the woman's vagina together with a gynecologist and reported finding no lesions or other injuries. However, private forensic pathologist Dr. Marios Matsakis, who was hired by her family to participate in the case, reported that there was clear evidence of gang rape. Later testifying for her defense at trial, he stated he found bruising across her legs, arms, and buttocks from photographs of her injuries shown in court, claiming that he identified 35 separate bruises, and that the injuries left "no doubt" of gang rape. He also criticised Sophocleus for allegedly improperly investigating her.

On 25 July, five of the youths were released due to a lack of DNA evidence connecting them to the alleged incident. Seven remained detained. In addition to the allegation of gang rape, they were suspected of conspiracy to commit a crime, including those whose DNA was not found on the complainant. Following DNA testing, police linked three of the detained to the case and also found three more DNA samples not matching any of the accused. Police suspected that three Israelis had participated but had subsequently returned to Israel, and prepared to send a team to Israel to work in coordination with the Israel Police and Israeli travel agencies to identify them. On 27 July, it was reported that three of the suspects were set to be charged, with police likely to release at least two other suspects. There were conflicting reports over whether or not police would offer immunity from prosecution to one or two of the suspects in exchange for information on other suspects still being sought. Police said they had taken statements from 36 witnesses and that they were planning to interview 20 more.

However, the investigation turned toward the British woman. According to an attorney for some of the Israelis, they were able to provide convincing evidence of their innocence. On 27 July, the British woman visited a police station to give a statement but was instead accused of lying about allegations. The teenager's defense claimed she had been subjected to eight hours of questioning without a lawyer. The woman signed a statement retracting her rape allegations:

The report I did on the 17th of July 2019 that I was raped at ayia napa was not the truth. The truth is that I wasnt raped and everything that happened in that appartment was with my consent. The reason I made the statement with the fake report is because I did not know they were recording & humiliating me that night I discovered them recording me doing sexual intercourse and I felt embarrassed as I want to appologise, and say I made a mistake.

The defence has contended that the defendant made the statement while under duress. Cypriot authorities charged her with "giving a false statement over an imaginary offence." On 28 July, the remaining Israeli suspects were released from custody. Cypriot Police claimed that the woman had got angry when her alleged attackers had filmed her having consensual sex with some of the alleged attackers and alleged she had been raped. Nir Yaslovitch, a lawyer representing several of the Israeli youths, said that his clients would seek legal damages against her for false rape allegations.

== Legal proceedings ==
=== Famagusta District Court ===
On 30 July, the woman appeared at the Famagusta District Court in Paralimni, where she was charged with acts of "public mischief" and remanded into custody for eight days. On 6 August 2019, the defendant repudiated her retraction statement, claiming that she had been coerced into producing it by the Cypriot Police. Her lawyer Andreas Pittadjis resigned due to a "serious disagreement" with his client regarding her line of defence. The trial judge Tonia Antoniou adjourned the case until 19 August to give the woman time to find a new lawyer. He also remanded the defendant into custody. The defendant was supported by the legal aid group Justice Abroad, which supported her claims that she had been coerced into producing a retraction statement.

On 27 August, the defendant pleaded not guilty to falsely claiming she was gang-raped and was bailed by a court on condition that she visited a police station in Nicosia three times a week before her trial. The woman was represented by British lawyer Lewis Power QC and two Cypriot lawyers, who were supported by Justice Abroad. The defendant had reportedly spent a month at the Central Jail of Nicosia, where she had reportedly shared a cramped cell with nine women. Michael Polak, the Director of Justice International and a member of the defence team, claimed that the defendant's interrogation violated the Constitution of Cyprus and European Union human rights legislation.

On 2 October, the defendant's trial began. While the defence maintained that the woman had been raped and had been coerced into issuing a retraction, the prosecution insisted that the police had acted properly throughout the investigation. Judge Michalis Papathanasiou adjourned the defendant's trial by two weeks to allow the defence to produce new evidence including text messages and images circulated by the alleged attackers to support their contention that she had been raped. The defendant was also reportedly suffering from Post-traumatic stress disorder due to her legal ordeal.

The teenager's trial resumed on 15 October 2019. On 28 November, the trial judge Michalis Papathansidi rejected the defence's claim of a forced confession and defended the police investigators who had conducted investigation. He ruled the defendant an "unreliable witness", claiming that she had provided the police with "contradictory, inconsistent, exaggerated and inflated" versions of the night of the alleged crime. The judge also dismissed the defence witnesses as unreliable and rejected the testimony of expert witnesses from the UK, including a forensic linguistic expert's testimony that the woman's confession was unlikely to have been written by a native English speaker. The trial proceeded with the testimony of police officers who had spoken to her on the night she had reported the alleged sexual assaults.

On 3 December 2019, the court heard the defendant's testimony, who maintained that she had been gang-raped by the Israeli youths and that she had been coerced by police into dropping the rape allegations. The case concluded on 6 December with testimony by defence witness, well-known pathologist Marios Matsakis. On 12 December, the defendant was told that she would have to remain in Cyprus over Christmas, with the final judgment expected on 30 December. On 30 December, the court found the defendant guilty of causing public mischief with her sentencing date set for 7 January 2020. In response, the defence said that they would appeal the verdict.

On 4 January 2020, the Famagusta District Court released their 70-page verdict defending their guilty verdict in response to criticism of the court's handling of the case from both Cyprus and abroad. On 7 January, Judge Papathanasiou sentenced the young woman to a four-month suspended sentence, with the defendant being allowed to leave Cyprus. Sixty Israelis came to show support for the defendant at the sentencing. In response, the defence announced that they would be appealing the conviction at the Supreme Court of Cyprus, a process expected to take several years.

=== Supreme Court of Cyprus ===
In mid September 2021, the defendant's lawyers lodged an appeal against her four-month sentence at the Supreme Court of Cyprus, arguing that her confession was extracted under duress in the absence of a translator or lawyer.

On 31 January 2022, the Supreme Court of Cyprus overturned her conviction, ruling that she had not received a fair trial.

The Times of Israel reported that the Supreme Court agreed with the defendant's lawyers that the trial process had been “manifestly unfair” and the judge's “interruptions and interventions were unjustified and inadmissible.”

One of the defendant's lawyers called the decision a “watershed moment” for his client and for those who have found themselves in similar situations.

=== European Court of Human Rights and aftermath ===
On 27 February 2025, the European Court of Human Rights ruled that Cypriot authorities failed to conduct a proper investigation into the case.

== Reactions ==
The Ayia Napa rape allegation case attracted considerable media coverage and commentary in the British, Israeli, and international news media.

=== Israeli society ===
Following their release in late July, several of the Israeli teenagers were greeted by their cheering families at Ben Gurion International Airport in Tel Aviv. According to media reports, the boys were dressed in kippahs and they and their male relatives popped champagne, let off a confetti cannon and chanted "Am Yisrael Chai" ("the people of Israel lives") and "the Brit is a whore." This heroes' welcome was criticized by several Israeli journalists, social media users, and parents for engaging in unethical behaviour including filming their sexual encounter with their alleged victim, which is illegal under Israeli law banning "revenge porn."

During a radio discussion about the case, Roni Daniel of Channel 12 said upon reports that the British woman had prior sexual encounters with some of the suspects, "Oh, she was used to two or three, suddenly [there are] 12, that's the breaking point?" This comment lead to hundreds of complaints to Israel's broadcasting authorities. A Channel 12 news report on the incident also drew complaints for using footage of bikini-clad women at a pool party. +972 Magazine noted a link between the portrayal of the case in Israeli media and Israel's militaristic society.

Journalists Orli Vilnai and her husband Guy Maroz dedicated two of the seven episodes of their Channel 13 show Orli veGuy to the incident: one from August 8th, 2019, covering the case in general and media shortcomings in addressing the alleged perpetrators’ culpability, and another from April 22nd, 2020, featuring an extended interview with the British woman. Vilnai expressed her support: “That young woman was physically raped, uniquivocally. We met a charming girl, 19 years old, whose PTSD cries out from almost every aspect of how she conducts herself. She gnaws on her own hands, occasionally getting ‘stuck’ that way, and so she gets sucked into her own world that she has to be waken out of. […] She is clearly a victim.”

=== Defendant's parents and human rights activists ===
On 9 August 2019, the British woman's parents established a GoFundMe campaign to raise £15,000 (US$18,000) to cover their daughter's legal fees following the resignation of her first lawyer Andreas Pittadjis. Aryeh Fraser, an Israeli man living in Miami, had donated £7,500 (US$9,000) to the GoFundMe campaign, describing it as a humanitarian donation. By 3 January 2020, the teenager's GoFundMe campaign had reach £120,000, exceeding its £105,000 target.

In October 2019, Michael Polak, the director of the legal aid organisation Justice Abroad and a member of the defence team, criticised the Cypriot Police's handling of the investigation into the rape allegations including allegedly coercing a retraction from the defendant without a lawyer present and not making any audio or video recordings of the defendant's interrogation. He also criticised the Cypriot Police for failing to download data from the alleged Israeli attackers' 11 mobile phones; the Police had downloaded videos from five of the Israeli youths' phones but had neglected to collect text messages and social media data.

On 14 October, several human rights and feminist groups urged the Cypriot attorney general Costas Clerides to dismiss the case against the British woman. Susana Pavlou, the Director of the Mediterranean Institute for Gender Studies, criticized the brutal ordeal experienced by the British woman and her family. Several Cypriot and Israeli feminists and women's rights activists also picketed the sentencing of the defendant on 7 January 2020, criticizing Judge Papathanasiou for victim blaming and siding with the alleged rapists.

=== Governmental responses ===
The United Kingdom Government has also raised concerns about the fairness of the teenager's trial in Cyprus. In response to the British woman's guilty verdict, a British Foreign and Commonwealth Office spokesperson issued a statement on 30 December 2019 that "the UK is seriously concerned about the fair trial guarantees in this deeply distressing case and we will be raising the issue with the Cypriot authorities." The British Foreign Secretary Dominic Raab also stated that the UK Government was examining guidelines for British tourists to Cyprus in light of the rape allegation case. Raab later welcomed the British woman's suspended jail term sentence but ruled out revising British tourism guidelines to Cyprus.

In early January 2020, there were media reports that the President of Cyprus Nicos Anastasiades was considering pardoning the British woman prior to her sentencing on 7 January.

=== Boycott Cyprus campaign ===
In January 2020, a campaign was launched on the social media platform Twitter with the hashtag #boycottcyprus. On 1 January, the British woman's mother expressed support for a boycott campaign against Cyprus, stating that the country was unsafe for tourists and condemning her daughter's guilty verdict as a miscarriage of justice. On 6 January, protesters expressing support for the teenager picketed the Cypriot High Commission in London. In addition, solidarity protests with the teenager were also planned in Nicosia and Tel Aviv to time with the teenager's sentencing.

On 3 January 2020, Summer Takeaways, the tour company behind the working holiday in which the British defendant had been allegedly gang raped, announced that the company would no longer provide services to Ayia Napa. The company removed all references to Ayia Napa on its website and offered refunds to customers who had booked for the upcoming 2020 summer tour to the destination.

=== Media commentary ===
The Independent's columnist Harriet Hall opined that the case reflected a long tradition of ignoring or punishing female rape victims.

== See also ==
- Cyprus–Israel relations
- Cyprus–United Kingdom relations
- Israel–United Kingdom relations
- Eilat gang rape
- Malka Leifer affair
