= 2019 in Cyprus =

- Decades: 1990s; 2000s; 2010s; 2020s
- See also: Other events of 2019; Timeline of Cypriot history

Events in the year 2019 in Cyprus.

== Incumbents ==
- President: Nicos Anastasiades
- President of the Parliament: Demetris Syllouris

== Events ==
Ongoing – Cyprus dispute

=== May ===
- 26 May – The 2019 European Parliament election was held to elect the country's six representatives to the European Parliament.

=== June ===
- 14 June – European Union Mediterranean state leaders offer full support to the country in its dispute with Turkey over offshore natural gas deposit ownership. French President Emmanuel Macron, speaking for the EU, urges Turkey to stop "illegal activities" in the country's exclusive economic zone.

== Deaths ==
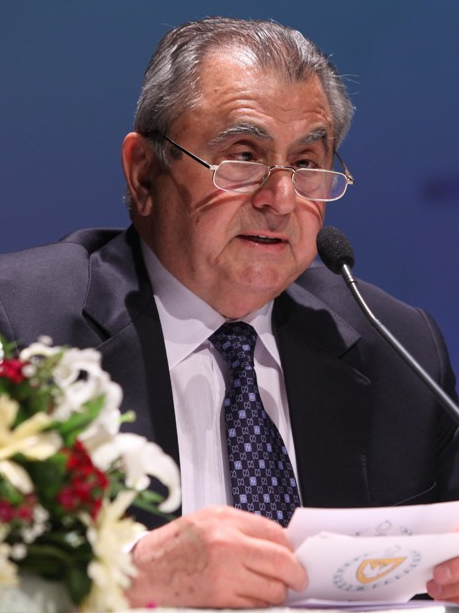
İrsen Küçük

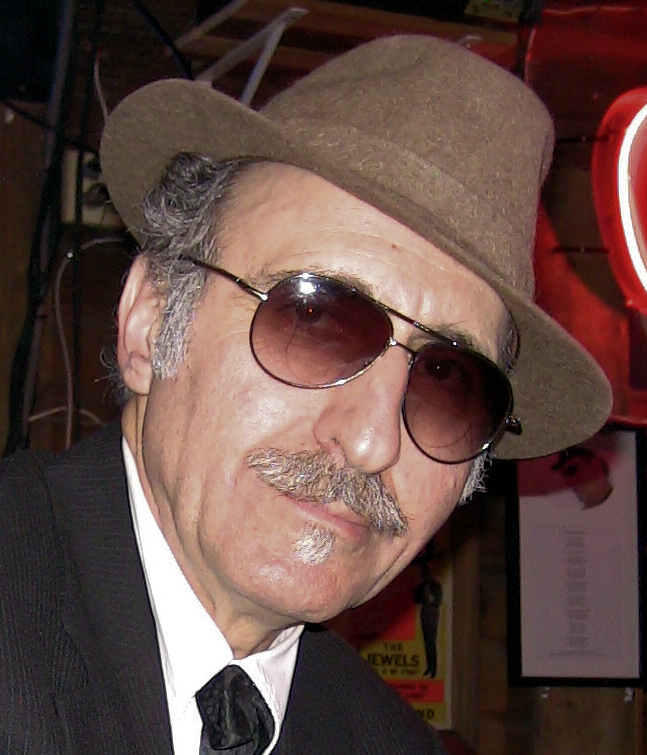
Leon Redbone

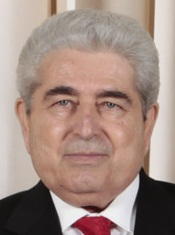
Demetris Christofias

=== March ===
- 10 March – İrsen Küçük, politician and former Prime Minister of Northern Cyprus (born 1940).
- 15 March – Mike Thalassitis, footballer and reality show personality (born 1993).

=== May ===
- 15 May – Michael Zampelas, politician (born 1937).
- 30 May – Leon Redbone, Cypriot-American singer-songwriter and actor (born 1949).

=== June ===
- 21 June – Demetris Christofias, politician and former President (born 1946).

=== July ===
- 15 July – Alexis Galanos, politician (born 1940).
