= 2023 in Cyprus =

- Decades: 2000s; 2010s; 2020s
- See also: Other events of 2023; Timeline of Cypriot history

Events in the year 2023 in Cyprus.

== Incumbents ==
- President: Nicos Anastasiades (till 28 February 2023) Nikos Christodoulides (present)
- President of the Parliament: Annita Demetriou

== Events ==
=== Ongoing ===
- Cyprus dispute
- 5 February – 2023 Cypriot presidential election: A runoff is called for 12 February between Nikos Christodoulides and Andreas Mavroyiannis.
- 12 February – Cypriots vote in a run-off for president between Nikos Christodoulides and Andreas Mavroyiannis
- 13 May – Cyprus in the Eurovision Song Contest 2023.
- 21 October – Police in Cyprus arrest four Syrians for detonating a small explosive device near the Israeli embassy in Nicosia.

== Sports ==
- 26 August 2022 – 4 June 2023: 2022–23 Cypriot First Division
- 5 October 2022 – May 2023: 2022–23 Cypriot Cup
- UEFA Euro 2024 qualifying Group A

== See also ==
- Northern Cyprus
