= Marios Matsakis =

Cypriot politician

Member of the European Parliament
- In office 2004–2009

Personal details
- Born: 2 August 1954 (age 71) Limassol, British Cyprus
- Party: Democratic Party
- Profession: Forensic pathologist

Marios Matsakis (born 2 August 1954) is a Greek-Cypriot doctor, coroner, forensic pathologist, and politician who served as Member of the European Parliament and Member of the House of Representatives for the Democratic Party from 2004 to 2009. He has been noted for his controversial statements and beliefs.

== Early life ==
Matsakis was born on 2 August 1954 in Limassol, which was then under the control of British Cyprus. He graduated from the University of London in 1976 with a BSc in microbiology and was awarded a PhD in biochemistry in 1981. He gained his medical degree from the University of Cambridge in 1984, and specialised in forensic medicine at the University of Glasgow, where he was awarded an MPhil in 1992. He then moved to Greece, where he continued his studies in forensic pathology. He returned to Cyprus in 1994. He initially assumed a position in the medical field, but soon became interested in politics and was elected as an MP in 1996.

== Career ==
In the European Parliament, Matsakis sat with the Alliance of Liberals and Democrats for Europe. He became involved in politics in the mid-1990s, and served as Member of the European Parliament and Member of the House of Representatives for the Democratic Party from 2004 to 2009. He ran for president in the 2008 Cypriot presidential elections, coming in fourth place with 0.77% of the national vote. He voted against what would later become Cyprus' universal healthcare service. During the 2019 Ayia Napa rape case, he testified that the victim had indeed been raped and that the rape kit exam presented in court as evidence was "incomplete". He disagreed with state pathologist Sophocles Sophocleous' conclusion that the victim bore no physical signs consistent with a serious sexual assault, telling the court that both the report's findings as well as special DNA tests and photographs were "consistent with the rape taking place" and that "violence was exercised".

== Controversies ==
=== Reputation ===
Matsakis has been noted for his controversial beliefs and false claims. In a 2020 interview, he claimed to have been arrested seven times by British authorities and three times by Turkish authorities. In the same interview, he said that "the vast majority" of his fellow Cypriots are "stupid cowards" who only care about "what they're going to eat [and] how many cars they're going to have".

=== Smuggling claims ===
On 30 October 2005, it was reported that Matsakis' home in Pyrga had been raided twice during the week by police and CID officials, accusing him of smuggling antiquities. He reportedly had "enough chests, amphoras and other artefacts for three antique stores". The first raid took place on 23 October 2005. Matsakis could be prosecuted under Cypriot law, as the European Parliament lifted his immunity earlier in the month. He was also charged with attempts to blackmail a drug squad officer in an unrelated case. Police officials found more than 110 chests and hundreds of Grecian urns on his property. Matsakis protested his innocence, stating, "It looks like some people do not want my voice to be heard in Cyprus or Europe."

It was reported on 22 August 2007 that all cases against Matsakis had collapsed and that he had been cleared. He called for an independent inquiry to examine possible police corruption, and to identify suspected political motives for the initiation of the whole affair, which started only three days after he was elected as a Member of the European Parliament. After two years, authorities returned 250 items that were confiscated from his home. The Attorney General of Cyprus, after studying the case, decided that no charge could be brought against Matsakis and all items seized from his home were to be returned to him.

=== Racism and homophobia ===
In 2008, Matsakis asked not to be sent "offensive" emails by fellow MEPs. The emails were invitations to the European Parliament's "Different Families, Same Love" exhibition, which showcased LGBT and mixed race families. He also complained to the president of the European Parliament about posters for the exhibition being stuck up near his office. LGBT activists in Cyprus pointed out Matsakis' hypocrisy regarding his stance against "non-normal" families, as his family situation included a child out of wedlock despite his Greek Orthodox beliefs. While participating on the talk show Tolmo in 2012, Matsakis claimed that "homosexuality is not normal" yet asserted that there is no homophobia in Cyprus, despite several studies by multiple organisations concluding that Cyprus is one of the most homophobic nations in Europe.

=== COVID-19 misinformation ===
Matsakis has been criticised for spreading misinformation related to the COVID-19 pandemic, downplaying the severity of the virus, sharing false claims about COVID-19 vaccines, and attributing COVID-19 deaths to other causes. His views on the pandemic were shared primarily through his Facebook page and the Cyprus Mail newspaper. He claimed to take these avenues because mainstream media outlets refused to give him a platform, and stated that he does not trust the WHO. In 2020, he called for the Cypriot government to immediately lift its "fascist restrictions" and end its lockdown, which he described as "extreme" and a "hysterical response". He also falsely claimed that the virus has killed fewer people than the flu and that "it is now obvious that the coronavirus pandemic is ending".
