= Leptos Estates =

- Industry: Property development
- Founded: 1960
- Founder: Michael Leptos
- Headquarters: Cyprus
- Area served: Cyprus, Greece, Middle East
- Key people: Pantelis Leptos, George Leptos
- Website: www.leptosestates.com

Leptos Estates is a property development group in Cyprus. Its latest developments include Limassol Del Mar, Adonis Beach Villas, Coral Seas Villas and Limassol Blu Marine.

== History ==
In the early 1960s, Michael Leptos started the property development business in Kyrenia, Cyprus. Following the 1974 events in Cyprus, the group's activities were relocated to the Middle East and the Persian Gulf, with an emphasis on constructing major residential developments. An example of these was the Saudia City project in Jeddah, comprising 4,000 homes.

Leptos expanded in the 1980s by purchasing a large area of land from the Bishop of Paphos. Subsequent developments in the area included the Kamares Village and Olympus Village projects. By 2005, Leptos had become the largest property developer on Cyprus.

The group later continued its activities in the region of Paphos. The company opened hotels, developed houses, and operated other businesses in the region. Later on, it continued its activities in Greece, specifically in the islands of Paros, Santorini, and Crete.

Michael Leptos died in 2021 at the age of 83.

== Developments ==
Michael Leptos, the founder of the company, opened the five-star hotel of Coral Bay, situated in Coral Bay, Cyprus. It then opened one more hotel in the same area, the Thalassa Boutique Hotel & Spa. The group now has a number of hotels and resorts, both in Cyprus and Greece, which operate under the Leptos Calypso Hotels Public Ltd.
