= Eilat gang rape =

Rape in a hotel in Israeli resort town of Eilat

- Location: Eilat, Israel
- Date: August 2020
- Attack type: Gang rape

The Eilat gang rape occurred in mid-August of 2020 at a hotel in the Israeli resort town of Eilat. According to Israeli media reports, the 16-year old victim went to Eilat with a friend and met a group of the friend's acquaintances. The group reportedly went out to drink together before returning to a hotel, where she was sexually assaulted. Officials stated that the teenager's friend attempted to intervene but was unable to prevent the incident.

By late August, Israeli police had arrested 14 suspects in connection with the case. A group of men lined up outside her hotel room door taking turns to rape her while she was intoxicated. Eyewitnesses, who police believe were in the room while the rapes occurred, did nothing, according to the prosecution:

The prosecution added that "The indictment shows that the suspects treated the complainant as an object, as a vessel for satisfying their urges, and none of them tried to stop what was happening or to help the minor in any way."

One of the suspects, a young man from Hadera, admitted filming the girl's rape but denied wrongdoing. He claimed that he attempted to help the victim. He and another Hadera resident are the main suspects among the 14 who were arrested and he has been remanded into custody. They are accused of bringing the intoxicated girl to the hotel room and raping her. Also charged are two 17 year old twin brothers from Lachish. Six minors from Lachish were charged with failure to stop a crime, aiding rape and other charges according to their alleged participation.

According to the prosecutor's statement, the men "carried out one after another, over the course of about an hour, sometimes as a group, cruel sex crimes against a minor out of loss of humanity and while blatantly ignoring her anguish."

One of the minors was convicted after reaching a plea bargain agreement with the prosecution in May 2021. He will be placed under house arrest between the hours of 23:00 to 06:00.

Benjamin Netanyahu called it "a crime against humanity".

== See also ==
- Shomrat gang rape
