= 2021 Limassol wildfires =

Series of wildfires in Cyprus in 2021

- Date: 3–5 July 2021
- Location: Limassol District, Cyprus

Impacts
- Deaths: 4

Ignition
- Cause: Heat wave, wind, possible arson

On 3 July 2021, wildfires broke out near the Cypriot village of Arakapas during a week-long heat wave that saw temperatures surpass 40 °C (104 °F). The fires spread throughout the Limassol District before being put out two days later with assistance from Greece, Israel, Italy, and the United Kingdom. They were described as the worst fires in the country's history. Four Egyptian men were killed, and a 67-year-old farmer was arrested in relation to the starting of the initial fire.
