= COVID-19 pandemic in Northern Cyprus =

- Disease: COVID-19
- Pathogen: SARS-CoV-2
- Location: Turkish Republic of Northern Cyprus
- First outbreak: Wuhan, Hubei, China
- Index case: North Nicosia
- Arrival date: 10 March 2020 (6 years, 7 months, 2 weeks and 4 days)
- Confirmed cases: 117,396
- Active cases: 309
- Recovered: 4,922
- Deaths: 117,087
- Fatality rate: 0.49%

Government website
- Official website

The COVID-19 pandemic in Northern Cyprus was a part of the ongoing pandemic of coronavirus disease 2019 (COVID-19) caused by severe acute respiratory syndrome coronavirus 2 (SARS-CoV-2).

The first case in Northern Cyprus was recorded on 10 March, when a local returned home from a trip to Europe. The first death due to COVID-19 in the country occurred on 28 March.

As of 21 April 2021, Northern Cyprus has 5,746 confirmed cases, 4,922 recoveries, 28 deaths, and a death rate of 87 per million people, one of the lowest rates globally.

As of 16 April 2021, Northern Cyprus's observed case-fatality rate stands at 0.52%, the 139th highest rate globally.

== Background ==
On 12 January 2020, the World Health Organization (WHO) confirmed that a novel coronavirus was the cause of a respiratory illness in a cluster of people in Wuhan City, Hubei Province, China, which was reported to the WHO on 31 December 2019.

The case fatality ratio for COVID-19 has been much lower than SARS of 2003, but the transmission has been significantly greater, with a significant total death toll.

== Timeline ==
=== March 2020 ===
The first case of SARS-CoV-2 in Northern Cyprus was identified by the Health Minister Ali Pilli as a female German tourist on 9 March 2020.

On 10 March, people found to have been in contact with the patient, including every passenger on the same plane were quarantined in three different hotels. Starting 11 March, foreign nationals were barred from entering Northern Cyprus, with some exceptions for those holding valid Alien Resident Certificates, diplomatic credentials, or other official documentation and special permits. Restrictions have since been relaxed for the 100,000 foreign university students in the country.

On 12 March, the country's second case was confirmed, being the spouse of the German tourist who became the first person diagnosed with COVID-19.

On 13 March, the Health Minister Ali Pilli announced that five people have been tested positive for the coronavirus, up from two.

On 17 March, the 2020 Northern Cypriot presidential election was delayed for 6 months due to the outbreak.

On 24 March, over 840 German national tourists were sent back to Germany after being quarantined for 14 days.

On 28 March, the first person died from COVID-19.

=== April 2020 ===
North Cyprus announced a partial curfew until 10 April. The exception being for use of markets and acquisition of necessities. A full curfew is applied between 9pm and 6am until 10 April. Due to increase of cases, curfew states extended by the end of April. There is a suggestion that "curfew may continue until the end of the summer".

15 villages within the İskele/Karpaz district are under full curfew due to high number of cases.

Turkish Cypriot authorities banned movement between districts, meaning no one will be allowed to travel from one district to another.

Three students out of 800 who came from UK and were under self isolated quarantine for 14 days, have tested positive.

There have been no new reported cases of coronavirus infections for the past ten days and the last COVID-19 death in North Cyprus was on 13 April. Early medical intervention has meant 99 of those who tested positive for coronavirus in the TRNC have made a full recovery. As of 27 April, five people remained in hospital.

=== May 2020 ===
On 11 May, the last coronavirus patient has been discharged from hospital and there are no active cases left.

=== July 2020 ===
On 1 July, following 76 days of no community transmissions, one such case was reported and the country went back into lockdown.

=== October 2020 ===
On 17 October, after 188 days with no deaths, the country's fifth death from COVID-19 was reported.

== Restrictions ==
Month	Gatherings	International travel	Internal travel	Freedom of movement	Schools	Businesses	Sources
March	Not allowed 23–31 March	Allowed	Requires prior permission 23–31 March.	Partial curfew 23–31 March	Open	Closed 23–31 March	
April	Not allowed.	Not allowed for non-citizens.	Partial and full curfew	Restricted	Closed	Closed	
May	Not allowed.	Not allowed for non-citizens.	Partial and full curfew	Restricted	Closed	Closed	
June	✓	Allowed with mandatory 14-day quarantine 8–30 June.	Allowed	✓	Open	Open	
July	✓	Allowed	Allowed	✓	Open	Open	
August	✓	Allowed	Allowed	✓	Open	Open	
September	✓	Allowed, with restrictions introduced on September 10.	Allowed	✓	Closed	Open	
October	Not allowed.	Allowed for some countries.	Allowed	✓	Open, with some restrictions.	Open, with restrictions.	
November	Not allowed.	Allowed for some countries.	Allowed	✓	Open, with some restrictions.	Open, with restrictions.	

== Statistics ==
=== Data table ===
COVID-19 cases and deaths in Northern Cyprus, March to June
Date	Confirmed cases		Deaths		Recoveries		Number of tests		Ratios	
Date	New	Total	New	Total	New	Total	New	Total	Positivity	Fatality
Mar 10, 2020	1	1	0	0	–	0	0	–	–	0.00%
Mar 11, 2020	0	1	0	0	–	0	0	–	–	0.00%
Mar 12, 2020	1	2	0	0	–	0	0	–	–	0.00%
Mar 13, 2020	3	5	0	0	–	0	0	–	–	0.00%
Mar 14, 2020	0	5	0	0	–	0	0	–	–	0.00%
Mar 15, 2020	1	6	0	0	–	0	0	–	–	0.00%
Mar 16, 2020	1	7	0	0	–	0	0	–	–	0.00%
Mar 17, 2020	13	20	0	0	–	0	0	–	–	0.00%
Mar 18, 2020	0	20	0	0	–	0	0	–	–	0.00%
Mar 19, 2020	13	33	0	0	–	0	0	–	–	0.00%
Mar 20, 2020	0	33	0	0	3	3	0	0	–	0.00%
Mar 21, 2020	2	35	0	0	–	3	0	0	–	0.00%
Mar 22, 2020	3	38	0	0	–	3	0	0	–	0.00%
Mar 23, 2020	2	40	0	0	–	3	0	0	–	0.00%
Mar 25, 2020	2	42	0	0	26	29	0	0	–	0.00%
Mar 26, 2020	5	47	0	0	–	29	0	0	–	0.00%
Mar 27, 2020	14	61	0	0	–	29	0	0	–	0.00%
Mar 28, 2020	1	62	1	1	0	29	0	0	–	1.61%
Mar 29, 2020	2	64	0	1	0	29	0	0	–	1.56%
Mar 30, 2020	8	69	0	1	0	29	0	0	–	1.45%
Mar 31, 2020	1	70	0	1	0	29	0	0	–	1.43%
Apr 01, 2020	7	77	1	2	0	29	0	0	–	2.60%
Apr 02, 2020	4	81	0	2	0	29	0	0	–	2.47%
Apr 03, 2020	7	88	0	2	0	29	0	0	–	2.27%
Apr 04, 2020	0	88	0	2	0	29	0	0	–	2.27%
Apr 05, 2020	3	91	0	2	7	36	0	0	–	2.20%
Apr 06, 2020	1	92	0	2	7	43	0	0	–	2.17%
Apr 07, 2020	2	94	1	3	1	44	0	0	–	3.19%
Apr 08, 2020	1	95	0	3	0	44	0	0	–	3.16%
Apr 09, 2020	1	96	0	3	0	44	0	0	–	3.13%
Apr 10, 2020	3	99	0	3	0	44	0	0	–	3.03%
Apr 11, 2020	0	99	0	3	1	45	0	0	–	3.03%
Apr 12, 2020	0	99	0	3	12	57	0	0	–	3.03%
Apr 13, 2020	1	100	1	4	5	62	0	0	–	4.00%
Apr 14, 2020	0	100	0	4	4	66	0	0	–	4.00%
Apr 15, 2020	5	105	0	4	8	74	0	0	–	3.81%
Apr 16, 2020	0	105	0	4	6	80	0	0	–	3.81%
Apr 17, 2020	3	108	0	4	1	81	0	0	–	3.70%
Apr 18, 2020	0	108	0	4	0	81	0	0	–	3.70%
Apr 19, 2020	1	108	0	4	3	84	0	0	–	3.70%
Apr 20, 2020	0	108	0	4	1	85	0	0	–	3.70%
Apr 21, 2020	0	108	0	4	0	85	0	0	–	3.70%
Apr 22, 2020	0	108	0	4	2	87	0	0	–	3.70%
Apr 23, 2020	0	108	0	4	0	87	0	0	–	3.70%
Apr 24, 2020	0	108	0	4	0	87	0	0	–	3.70%
Apr 25, 2020	0	108	0	4	5	92	0	0	–	3.70%
Apr 26, 2020	0	108	0	4	0	92	0	0	–	3.70%
Apr 27, 2020	0	108	0	4	7	99	0	0	–	3.70%
Apr 28, 2020	0	108	0	4	0	99	0	0	–	3.70%
Apr 29, 2020	0	108	0	4	2	101	0	0	–	3.70%
Apr 30, 2020	0	108	0	4	0	101	0	0	–	3.70%
May 01, 2020	0	108	0	4	1	102	0	0	–	3.70%
May 02, 2020	0	108	0	4	1	103	0	0	–	3.70%
May 03, 2020	0	108	0	4	0	103	0	0	–	3.70%
May 04, 2020	0	108	0	4	0	103	0	0	–	3.70%
May 05, 2020	0	108	0	4	0	103	0	0	–	3.70%
May 06, 2020	0	108	0	4	0	103	0	0	–	3.70%
May 07, 2020	0	108	0	4	0	103	0	0	–	3.70%
May 08, 2020	0	108	0	4	0	103	0	0	–	3.70%
May 09, 2020	0	108	0	4	0	103	0	0	–	3.70%
May 10, 2020	0	108	0	4	0	103	0	0	–	3.70%
May 11, 2020	0	108	0	4	1	104	0	0	–	3.70%
May 13, 2020	0	108	0	4	0	104	0	0	–	3.70%
May 14, 2020	0	108	0	4	0	104	0	0	–	3.70%
May 15, 2020	0	108	0	4	0	104	0	0	–	3.70%
May 17, 2020	0	108	0	4	0	104	0	0	–	3.70%
May 18, 2020	0	108	0	4	0	104	0	0	–	3.70%
May 19, 2020	0	108	0	4	0	104	0	0	–	3.70%
May 20, 2020	0	108	0	4	0	104	0	0	–	3.70%
May 21, 2020	0	108	0	4	0	104	0	0	–	3.70%
May 22, 2020	0	108	0	4	0	104	0	0	–	3.70%
May 23, 2020	0	108	0	4	0	104	0	0	–	3.70%
May 24, 2020	0	108	0	4	0	104	0	0	–	3.70%
May 25, 2020	0	108	0	4	0	104	0	0	–	3.70%
May 26, 2020	0	108	0	4	0	104	0	0	–	3.70%
May 27, 2020	0	108	0	4	0	104	0	0	–	3.70%
May 28, 2020	0	108	0	4	0	104	0	0	–	3.70%
May 29, 2020	0	108	0	4	0	104	0	0	–	3.70%
May 30, 2020	0	108	0	4	0	104	0	0	–	3.70%
May 31, 2020	0	108	0	4	0	104	0	0	–	3.70%
Jun 01, 2020	0	108	0	4	0	104	0	0	–	3.70%
Jun 02, 2020	0	108	0	4	0	104	0	0	–	3.70%
Jun 03, 2020	0	108	0	4	0	104	0	0	–	3.70%
Jun 04, 2020	0	108	0	4	0	104	0	0	–	3.70%
Jun 05, 2020	0	108	0	4	0	104	0	0	–	3.70%
Jun 06, 2020	0	108	0	4	0	104	0	0	–	3.70%
Jun 07, 2020	0	108	0	4	0	104	0	0	–	3.70%
Jun 08, 2020	0	108	0	4	0	104	0	0	–	3.70%
Jun 09, 2020	0	108	0	4	0	104	0	0	–	3.70%
Jun 10, 2020	0	108	0	4	0	104	0	0	–	3.70%
Jun 11, 2020	0	108	0	4	0	104	0	0	–	3.70%
Jun 12, 2020	0	108	0	4	0	104	0	0	–	3.70%
Jun 13, 2020	0	108	0	4	0	104	0	0	–	3.70%
Jun 14, 2020	0	108	0	4	0	104	0	0	–	3.70%
Jun 15, 2020	0	108	0	4	0	104	0	0	–	3.70%
Jun 16, 2020	0	108	0	4	0	104	0	0	–	3.70%
Jun 17, 2020	0	108	0	4	0	104	0	0	–	3.70%
Jun 18, 2020	0	108	0	4	0	104	0	0	–	3.70%
Jun 19, 2020	0	108	0	4	0	104	0	0	–	3.70%
Jun 20, 2020	0	108	0	4	0	104	0	0	–	3.70%
Jun 21, 2020	0	108	0	4	0	104	0	0	–	3.70%
Jun 22, 2020	0	108	0	4	0	104	0	0	–	3.70%
Jun 23, 2020	0	108	0	4	0	104	0	0	–	3.70%
Jun 24, 2020	0	108	0	4	0	104	0	0	–	3.70%
Jun 25, 2020	0	108	0	4	0	104	0	0	–	3.70%
Jun 26, 2020	0	108	0	4	0	104	0	0	–	3.70%
Jun 27, 2020	0	108	0	4	0	104	0	0	–	3.70%
Jun 28, 2020	0	108	0	4	0	104	0	0	–	3.70%
Jun 29, 2020	0	108	0	4	0	104	0	0	–	3.70%
Jun 30, 2020	0	108	0	4	0	104	0	0	–	3.70%

COVID-19 cases and deaths in Northern Cyprus, July to September
July to September
Date	Confirmed cases		Deaths		Recoveries		Number of tests		Ratios	
Date	New	Total	New	Total	New	Total	New	Total	Positivity	Fatality
Jul 01, 2020	1	109	0	4	0	104	803	61,560	0.12%	3.67%
Jul 02, 2020	2	111	0	4	0	104	569	62,129	0.35%	3.60%
Jul 03, 2020	1	112	0	4	0	104	1,280	63,409	0.08%	3.57%
Jul 04, 2020	1	113	0	4	0	104	889	64,298	0.11%	3.54%
Jul 05, 2020	0	113	0	4	0	104	664	64,962	0.00%	3.54%
Jul 06, 2020	0	113	0	4	0	104	1,182	66,144	0.00%	3.54%
Jul 07, 2020	0	113	0	4	0	104	991	67,135	0.00%	3.54%
Jul 08, 2020	1	114	0	4	0	104	778	67,913	0.13%	3.51%
Jul 09, 2020	1	115	0	4	0	104	779	68,692	0.13%	3.48%
Jul 10, 2020	0	115	0	4	0	104	1,103	69,795	0.00%	3.48%
Jul 11, 2020	0	115	0	4	0	104	428	70,223	0.00%	3.48%
Jul 12, 2020	0	115	0	4	0	104	743	70,966	0.00%	3.48%
Jul 13, 2020	1	116	0	4	0	104	1,080	72,046	0.09%	3.45%
Jul 14, 2020	1	117	0	4	0	104	553	72,599	0.18%	3.42%
Jul 15, 2020	0	117	0	4	1	105	1,043	73,642	0.00%	3.42%
Jul 16, 2020	0	117	0	4	1	106	1,049	74,691	0.00%	3.42%
Jul 17, 2020	0	117	0	4	0	106	1,602	76,293	0.00%	3.42%
Jul 18, 2020	1	118	0	4	0	106	1,582	77,875	0.06%	3.39%
Jul 19, 2020	3	121	0	4	0	106	1,702	79,577	0.18%	3.31%
Jul 20, 2020	2	123	0	4	0	106	0	79,577	0.00%	3.25%
Jul 21, 2020	2	125	0	4	0	106	1,001	80,578	0.20%	3.20%
Jul 22, 2020	5	130	0	4	0	106	1,142	81,720	0.44%	3.08%
Jul 23, 2020	1	131	0	4	3	109	0	81,720	0.00%	3.05%
Jul 24, 2020	0	131	0	4	0	109	0	81,720	0.00%	3.05%
Jul 25, 2020	2	133	0	4	0	109	0	81,720	0.00%	3.01%
Jul 26, 2020	0	133	0	4	0	109	0	81,720	0.00%	3.01%
Jul 27, 2020	2	135	0	4	0	109	1,391	83,111	0.14%	2.96%
Jul 28, 2020	3	138	0	4	0	109	857	83,968	0.35%	2.90%
Jul 29, 2020	4	142	0	4	2	111	1,443	85,411	0.28%	2.82%
Jul 30, 2020	2	144	0	4	3	114	0	85,411	0.00%	2.78%
Jul 31, 2020	1	145	0	4	6	120	0	85,411	0.00%	2.76%
Aug 01, 2020	1	146	0	4	0	120	0	85,411	0.00%	2.74%
Aug 02, 2020	5	151	0	4	0	120	0	85,411	0.00%	2.65%
Aug 03, 2020	2	153	0	4	1	121	0	85,411	0.00%	2.61%
Aug 04, 2020	5	158	0	4	0	121	1,238	86,649	0.40%	2.53%
Aug 05, 2020	4	162	0	4	5	126	1,220	87,869	0.33%	2.47%
Aug 06, 2020	1	163	0	4	9	135	993	88,862	0.10%	2.45%
Aug 07, 2020	2	165	0	4	2	137	1,851	90,713	0.11%	2.42%
Aug 08, 2020	4	169	0	4	0	137	0	90,713	0.00%	2.37%
Aug 09, 2020	11	171	0	4	0	137	1,960	92,673	0.56%	2.34%
Aug 10, 2020	8	179	0	4	0	137	2,280	94,953	0.35%	2.23%
Aug 11, 2020	4	183	0	4	0	137	1,567	96,520	0.26%	2.19%
Aug 12, 2020	2	185	0	4	1	138	1,778	98,298	0.11%	2.16%
Aug 13, 2020	6	191	0	4	0	138	1,389	99,687	0.43%	2.09%
Aug 14, 2020	5	196	0	4	1	139	2,084	101,771	0.24%	2.04%
Aug 15, 2020	10	206	0	4	1	140	2,012	103,783	0.50%	1.94%
Aug 16, 2020	6 (Note: Reported by the authorities as 3.)	212	0	4	2	142	1,414	105,197	0.00%	1.89%
Aug 17, 2020	9	221	0	4	7	147	2,412	107,609	0.37%	1.81%
Aug 18, 2020	9	230	0	4	7	154	1,695	109,304	0.53%	1.74%
Aug 19, 2020	4	234	0	4	6	160	1,309	110,613	0.31%	1.71%
Aug 20, 2020	3	237	0	4	7	167	1,723	112,336	0.17%	1.69%
Aug 21, 2020	10	247	0	4	2	169	1,977	114,313	0.51%	1.62%
Aug 22, 2020	16	263	0	4	7	176	2,070	116,383	0.77%	1.52%
Aug 23, 2020	8	271	0	4	4	180	1,181	117,564	0.68%	1.48%
Aug 24, 2020	6	277	0	4	6	186	1,922	119,486	0.31%	1.44%
Aug 25, 2020	4	281	0	4	6	192	1,503	120,989	0.27%	1.42%
Aug 26, 2020	19	300	0	4	2	194	1,451	122,440	1.31%	1.33%
Aug 27, 2020	1	301	0	4	10	204	1,592	124,032	0.06%	1.33%
Aug 28, 2020	10	311	0	4	7	211	1,723	125,755	0.58%	1.29%
Aug 29, 2020	5	316	0	4	9	220	1,417	127,172	0.35%	1.27%
Aug 30, 2020	6	322	0	4	5	225	1,263	128,435	0.48%	1.24%
Aug 31, 2020	9	331	0	4	4	229	1,749	130,184	0.51%	1.21%
Sep 01, 2020	8	339	0	4	12	241	1,455	131,639	0.55%	1.18%
Sep 02, 2020	5	344	0	4	17	258	1,724	133,363	0.29%	1.16%
Sep 03, 2020	17	361	0	4	11	269	1,265	134,628	1.34%	1.11%
Sep 04, 2020	10	371	0	4	5	274	1,940	136,568	0.52%	1.08%
Sep 05, 2020	26	397	0	4	4	278	1,395	137,963	1.86%	1.01%
Sep 06, 2020	14	411	0	4	2	280	1,302	139,265	1.08%	0.97%
Sep 07, 2020	26	437	0	4	3	283	1,811	141,076	1.44%	0.92%
Sep 08, 2020	38	475	0	4	3	286	1,561	142,637	2.43%	0.84%
Sep 09, 2020	19	494	0	4	10	296	1,214	143,851	1.57%	0.81%
Sep 10, 2020	22	516	0	4	15	311	1,210	145,061	1.82%	0.78%
Sep 11, 2020	25	541	0	4	10	321	2,341	147,402	1.07%	0.74%
Sep 12, 2020	32	573	0	4	5	326	2,254	149,656	1.42%	0.70%
Sep 13, 2020	20	593	0	4	5	331	1,996	151,652	1.00%	0.67%
Sep 14, 2020	14	607	0	4	4	335	2,149	153,801	0.65%	0.66%
Sep 15, 2020	21	628	0	4	8	343	2,002	155,803	1.05%	0.64%
Sep 16, 2020	11	639	0	4	13	356	2,408	158,211	0.46%	0.63%
Sep 17, 2020	12	651	0	4	7	363	2,291	160,502	0.52%	0.61%
Sep 18, 2020	21	672	0	4	29	392	2,088	162,590	1.01%	0.60%
Sep 19, 2020	22	694	0	4	7	399	1,538	164,128	1.43%	0.58%
Sep 20, 2020	6	700	0	4	29	428	1,150	165,278	%0.52	0.57%
Sep 21, 2020	4	704	0	4	22	450	1,485	166,763	0.26%	0.57%
Sep 22, 2020	7	711	0	4	18	468	1,447	168,210	0.48%	0.56%
Sep 23, 2020	14	725	0	4	24	492	1,323	169,533	1.06%	0.55%
Sep 24, 2020	7	732	0	4	29	521	1,866	171,399	0.38%	0.55%
Sep 25, 2020	3	735	0	4	24	545	1,046	172,445	0.29%	0.54%
Sep 26, 2020	6	741	0	4	32	577	965	173,410	0.62%	0.54%
Sep 27, 2020	5	746	0	4	10	587	779	174,189	0.64%	0.54%
Sep 28, 2020	6	752	0	4	17	604	1,593	175,782	0.38%	0.53%
Sep 29, 2020	5	757	0	4	21	625	0	175,782	0.00%	0.53%
Sep 30, 2020	0	757	0	4	22	647	1,465	177,247	0.00%	0.53%

COVID-19 cases and deaths in Northern Cyprus, nationwide
October to December
Date	Confirmed cases		Deaths		Recoveries		Number of tests		Ratios	
Date	New	Total	New	Total	New	Total	New	Total	Positivity	Fatality
Oct 01, 2020	4	761	0	4	22	669	1,576	178,823	0.25%	0.53%
Oct 02, 2020	1	762	0	4	21	690	1,446	180,269	0.07%	0.52%
Oct 03, 2020	8	770	0	4	15	705	1,077	181,346	0.74%	0.52%
Oct 04, 2020	2	772	0	4	16	721	1,335	182,681	0.15%	0.52%
Oct 05, 2020	3	775	0	4	7	728	2,069	184,750	0.14%	0.52%
Oct 06, 2020	3	778	0	4	3	731	2,811	187,561	0.11%	0.51%
Oct 07, 2020	1	779	0	4	8	739	3,012	190,573	0.03%	0.51%
Oct 08, 2020	10	789	0	4	7	746	1,852	192,425	0.54%	0.51%
Oct 09, 2020	8	797	0	4	5	751	1,915	194,340	0.42%	0.50%
Oct 10, 2020	10	807	0	4	5	756	0	194,340	0.00%	0.50%
Oct 11, 2020	7	814	0	4	8	764	1,234	195,574	0.57%	0.49%
Oct 12, 2020	1	815	0	4	3	767	1,441	197,015	0.07%	0.49%
Oct 13, 2020	1	816	0	4	2	769	0	197,015	0.00%	0.49%
Oct 14, 2020	3	819	0	4	1	770	1,901	198,916	0.16%	0.49%
Oct 15, 2020	5	824	0	4	7	777	0	198,916	0.00%	0.49%
Oct 16, 2020	5	829	0	4	0	777	1,731	200,647	0.29%	0.48%
Oct 17, 2020	7	836	1	5	5	782	1,537	202,184	0.46%	0.60%
Oct 18, 2020	16	852	0	5	1	783	872	203,056	1.83%	0.59%
Oct 19, 2020	9	861	0	5	2	785	2,070	205,126	0.43%	0.58%
Oct 20, 2020	5	866	0	5	0	785	0	205,126	0.00%	0.58%
Oct 21, 2020	5	871	0	5	10	795	1,476	206,602	0.34%	0.57%
Oct 22, 2020	3	874	0	5	9	804	1,920	208,522	0.16%	0.57%
Oct 23, 2020	11	885	0	5	10	814	2,051	210,573	0.54%	0.56%
Oct 24, 2020	9	894	0	5	2	816	1,820	212,393	0.49%	0.56%
Oct 25, 2020	5	899	0	5	14	830	1,105	213,498	0.45%	0.56%
Oct 26, 2020	11	910	0	5	5	835	2,140	215,638	0.51%	0.55%
Oct 27, 2020	10	920	0	5	8	843	1,901	217,539	0.53%	0.54%
Oct 28, 2020	4	924	0	5	2	845	2,078	219,617	0.19%	0.54%
Oct 29, 2020	3	927	0	5	7	852	1,508	221,125	0.20%	0.54%
Oct 30, 2020	4	931	0	5	7	859	2,056	223,181	0.19%	0.54%
Oct 31, 2020	7	938	0	5	9	868	1,364	224,545	0.51%	0.53%
Nov 01, 2020	1	939	0	5	5	873	929	225,474	0.11%	0.53%
Nov 02, 2020	0	939	0	5	4	877	1,759	227,233	0.00%	0.53%
Nov 03, 2020	6	945	0	5	1	878	1,789	229,022	0.34%	0.53%
Nov 04, 2020	4	949	0	5	6	884	1,351	230,373	0.30%	0.53%
Nov 05, 2020	7	956	0	5	16	900	1,237	231,610	0.57%	0.52%
Nov 06, 2020	2	958	0	5	2	902	1,228	232,838	0.16%	0.52%
Nov 07, 2020	10	968	0	5	5	907	1,899	234,737	0.53%	0.52%
Nov 08, 2020	5	973	0	5	5	912	1,134	235,871	0.44%	0.51%
Nov 09, 2020	3	976	0	5	4	916	1,686	237,557	0.18%	0.51%
Nov 10, 2020	4	980	0	5	9	925	1,360	238,917	0.29%	0.51%
Nov 11, 2020	6	986	0	5	5	930	1,341	240,258	0.45%	0.51%
Nov 12, 2020	3	989	0	5	10	940	1,150	241,408	0.26%	0.51%
Nov 13, 2020	1	990	0	5	3	943	2,653	244,061	0.04%	0.51%
Nov 14, 2020	4	994	0	5	0	943	1,621	245,682	0.25%	0.50%
Nov 15, 2020	5	999	0	5	0	943	1,014	246,696	0.49%	0.50%
Nov 16, 2020	4	1,003	0	5	8	951	1,748	248,444	0.23%	0.50%
Nov 17, 2020	3	1,006	0	5	5	956	1,220	249,664	0.25%	0.50%
Nov 18, 2020	14	1,020	0	5	3	959	0	249,664	0.00%	0.49%
Nov 19, 2020	7	1,027	0	5	9	968	1,125	250,789	0.62%	0.49%
Nov 20, 2020	4	1,031	0	5	8	976	1,402	252,191	0.29%	0.49%
Nov 21, 2020	17	1,048	0	5	6	982	1,322	253,513	1.29%	0.48%
Nov 22, 2020	3	1,051	0	5	10	992	1,008	254,521	0.30%	0.48%
Nov 23, 2020	2	1,053	0	5	4	996	1,053	255,574	0.19%	0.47%
Nov 24, 2020	9 (Note: Initially reported as 2 new cases on November 24th; updated on November 25th)	1,062	0	5	7	1,003	1,150	256,724	0.78%	0.47%
Nov 25, 2020	6	1,068	0	5	4	1,007	1,335	258,059	0.45%	0.47%
Nov 26, 2020	6	1,077	0	5	4	1,011	1,045	259,104	0.86%	0.46%
Nov 27, 2020	6	1,084	0	5	4	1,012	1,620	260,727	0.43%	0.46%
Nov 28, 2020	6	1,095	0	5	4	1,015	1,592	262,319	0.69%	0.46%
Nov 29, 2020	8	1,103	0	5	8	1,023	1,093	263,412	0.73%	0.45%
Nov 30, 2020	8	1,103	0	5	0	1,023	1,593	265,005	0.31%	0.45%
Dec 01, 2020	21	1,129	0	5	6	1,029	1,375	266,380	1.53%	0.44%
Dec 02, 2020	9	1,138	0	5	13	1,042	1,384	267,764	0.65%	0.44%
Dec 03, 2020	6	1,144	0	5	2	1,044	1,591	269,354	0.38%	0.44%
Dec 05, 2020	14	1,164	0	5	5	1,056	2,845	273,979	0.49%	0.43%
Dec 06, 2020	12	1,176	0	5	2	1,058	1,146	275,105	1.05%	0.43%
Dec 07, 2020	14	1,190	0	5	5	1,063	1,834	276,939	1.05%	0.42%
Dec 08, 2020	13	1,203	1	6	10	1,073	1,566	278,505	1.05%	0.50%
Dec 09, 2020	20	1,223	0	6	6	1,079	1,316	279,821	1.05%	0.49%
Dec 10, 2020	12	1,253	0	6	16	1,095	1,470	281,291	1.05%	0.48%
Dec 11, 2020	7	1,242	0	6	13	1,108	1,386	282,677	1.05%	0.48%
Dec 12, 2020	15	1,257	0	6	5	1,113	1,425	284,102	1.05%	0.48%
Dec 13, 2020	13	1,270	0	6	4	1,117	1,384	285,486	0.94%	0.47%
Dec 14, 2020	8	1,278	0	6	7	1,124	1,851	287,337	0.43%	0.47%
Dec 15, 2020	17	1,295	0	6	16	1,140	1,714	289,051	0.99%	0.46%
Dec 16, 2020	14	1,309	0	6	17	1,157	1,672	290,723	0.84%	0.46%
Dec 17, 2020	33	1,342	0	6	24	1,181	1,840	292,563	1.79%	0.45%
Dec 18, 2020	13	1,355	0	6	22	1,203	1,945	294,508	0.67%	0.44%
Dec 19, 2020	21	1,376	0	6	12	1,215	1,700	296,203	1.24%	0.44%
Dec 20, 2020	19	1,395	0	6	8	1,218	2,000	298,208	0.95%	0.43%
Dec 21, 2020	17	1,412	0	6	7	1,225	3,521	301,728	0.48%	0.42%
Dec 23, 2020	7	1,440	0	6	12	1,242	5,559	310,855	0.13%	0.42%
Dec 24, 2020	11	1,451	0	6	9	1,251	3,663	314,518	0.30%	0.41%
Dec 25, 2020	8	1,459	0	6	9	1,260	2,613	317,131	0.31%	0.41%
Dec 26, 2020	13	1,472	0	6	15	1,275	2,010	319,141	0.65%	0.41%
Dec 27, 2020	20	1,492	0	6	13	1,288	1,853	320,994	1.08%	0.40%
Dec 28, 2020	14	1,499	0	6	10	1,291	2,203	323,197	0.64%	0.40%
Dec 29, 2020	33	1,532	0	6	18	1,309	2,519	325,716	1.31%	0.39%
Dec 30, 2020	16	1,555	0	6	23	1,332	2,678	328,394	0.60%	0.39%
Dec 31, 2020	19	1,574	0	6	12	1,344	1,322	329,716	1.44%	0.38%
Jan 01, 2021	18	1,592	1	7	11	1,355	768	330,484	2.34%	0.44%
Jan 02, 2021	14	1,606	0	7	29	1,384	1,570	332,054	0.89%	0.44%
Jan 03, 2021	30	1,640	1	8	14	1,398	1,540	333,594	1.95%	0.49%
Jan 04, 2021	26	1,666	0	8	17	1,415	1,893	335,487	1.37%	0.48%
Jan 05, 2021	26	1,692	1	9	15	1,430	3,073	338,560	0.85%	0.53%
Jan 06, 2021	18	1,710	0	9	8	1,438	2,591	341,151	0.69%	0.53%
Jan 07, 2021	25	1,735	0	9	18	1,456	2,703	343,854	0.92%	0.52%
Jan 08, 2021	8	1,743	1	9	25	1,481	2,556	346,410	0.31%	0.52%
Jan 09, 2021	22	1,765	0	10	18	1,499	3,195	349,605	0.69%	0.57%
Jan 10, 2021	14	1,779	0	10	17	1,516	2,154	351,750	0.65%	0.56%
Jan 11, 2021	21	1,800	0	10	23	1,539	2,868	354,618	0.73%	0.56%
Jan 12, 2021	10	1,810	1	10	17	1,556	2,215	356,833	0.45%	0.55%
Jan 13, 2021	19	1,829	0	11	19	1,575	2,040	358,873	0.93%	0.60%
Jan 14, 2021	21	1,850	0	11	27	1,602	2,422	361,295	0.87%	0.59%
Jan 15, 2021	31	1,881	0	11	24	1,626	2,103	363,398	1.47%	0.58%
Jan 16, 2021	14	1,895	0	11	17	1,643	1,835	365,233	0.76%	0.58%
Jan 17, 2021	12	1,907	0	11	14	1,657	1,560	366,793	0.77%	0.58%
Jan 18, 2021	14	1,921	0	11	15	1,672	2,517	369,310	0.56%	0.57%
Jan 19, 2021	23	1,944	0	11	21	1,693	2,662	371,972	0.86%	0.57%
Jan 20, 2021	27	1,971	0	11	20	1,713	1,633	373,605	1.65%	0.56%
Jan 21, 2021	12	1,983	0	11	21	1,734	2,980	376,585	0.40%	0.55%
Jan 22, 2021	14	1,997	1	12	19	1,753	2,037	378,622	0.69%	0.60%
Jan 23, 2021	15	2,012	0	12	17	1,770	1,173	380,395	1.28%	0.60%
Jan 24, 2021	27	2,039	2	14	14	1,784	1,740	382,135	1.55%	0.69%
Jan 25, 2021	32	2,071	0	14	9	1,793	2,784	384,919	1.15%	0.68%
Jan 26, 2021	38	2,109	0	14	19	1,812	3,665	388,584	1.04%	0.66%
Jan 28, 2021	47	2,208	0	14	8	1,834	3,605	395,689	1.30%	0.63%
Jan 29, 2021	47	2,255	0	14	16	1,850	3,308	398,997	1.42%	0.62%
Jan 30, 2021	32	2,287	0	14	13	1,863	2,135	2,135	1.50%	0.61%
Jan 31, 2021	38	2,325	0	14	16	1,879	2,826	2,826	1.34%	0.60%
Feb 01, 2021	46	2,371	0	14	18	1,897	3,157	3,157	1.46%	0.59%
Feb 02, 2021	62	2,433	0	14	5	1,902	4,016	4,016	1.54%	0.58%
Feb 03, 2021	71	2,504	0	14	21	1,923	4,054	4,054	1.75%	0.56%
Feb 04, 2021	80	2,584	0	14	35	1,958	6,937	6,937	1.15%	0.54%
Feb 05, 2021	74	2,658	0	14	13	1,971	6,325	6,325	1.17%	0.53%
Feb 06, 2021	64	2,722	1	15	36	2,007	5,501	5,501	1.16%	0.55%
Feb 07, 2021	47	2,769	1	16	40	2,047	3,900	3,900	1.21%	0.58%
Feb 08, 2021	65	2,834	0	16	24	2,071	4,058	4,058	1.60%	0.56%
Feb 09, 2021	50	2,884	0	16	41	2,112	5,103	5,103	0.98%	0.55%
Feb 10, 2021	34	2,919	0	16	45	2,157	4,880	4,880	0.70%	0.55%
Feb 11, 2021	48	2,967	1	17	30	2,187	5,764	5,764	0.83%	0.57%
Feb 12, 2021	40	3,007	0	17	43	2,230	4,222	4,222	0.95%	0.57%
Feb 13, 2021	30	3,037	0	17	53	2,283	4,337	4,337	0.69%	0.56%
Feb 14, 2021	17	3,054	2	19	55	2,338	5,033	5,033	0.34%	0.62%
Feb 15, 2021	28	3,082	0	19	70	2,408	5,189	5,189	0.54%	0.62%
Feb 16, 2021	23	3,105	1	20	75	2,483	4,784	4,784	0.48%	0.64%
Feb 17, 2021	27	3,132	1	21	53	2,536	3,590	3,590	0.75%	0.67%
Feb 18, 2021	25	3,157	0	21	68	2,604	3,894	3,894	0.64%	0.67%
Feb 19, 2021	14	3,171	1	22	69	2,673	5,056	5,056	0.28%	0.69%
Feb 20, 2021	21	3,192	0	22	71	2,744	4,847	4,847	0.43%	0.69%
Feb 21, 2021	23	3,216	1	23	56	2,800	4,666	4,666	0.49%	0.72%
Feb 22, 2021	16	3,232	0	23	31	2,831	5,907	5,907	0.27%	0.71%
Feb 23, 2021	16	3,248	0	23	46	2,877	6,592	6,592	0.24%	0.71%
Feb 24, 2021	49	3,297	0	23	40	2,917	5,143	5,143	0.95%	0.70%
Feb 25, 2021	21	3,318	0	23	15	2,932	6,179	6,179	0.34%	0.69%
Feb 26, 2021	38	3,356	0	23	23	2,955	5,494	5,494	0.69%	0.69%
Feb 27, 2021	27	3,383	0	23	23	2,978	5,092	5,092	0.53%	0.68%
Feb 28, 2021	33	3,416	0	23	24	3,002	3,338	3,338	0.99%	0.67%
Mar 01, 2021	41	3,457	0	23	5	3,007	6,133	6,133	0.67%	0.67%
Mar 02, 2021	35	3,492	0	23	54	3,061	7,435	7,435	0.47%	0.66%
Mar 03, 2021	27	3,519	1	24	26	3,087	6,038	6,038	0.45%	0.68%
Mar 04, 2021	29	3,548	0	24	32	3,119	5,276	5,276	0.55%	0.68%
Mar 05, 2021	39	3,587	0	24	36	3,155	5,730	5,730	0.68%	0.67%
Mar 06, 2021	14	3,601	0	24	33	3,188	6,426	6,426	0.22%	0.67%
Mar 07, 2021	19	3,620	0	24	17	3,205	4,005	4,005	0.47%	0.66%
Mar 08, 2021	17	3,637	0	24	43	3,248	6,164	6,164	0.28%	0.66%
Mar 09, 2021	27	3,664	0	24	37	3,285	7,092	7,092	0.38%	0.66%
Mar 10, 2021	34	3,698	0	24	30	3,315	5,743	5,743	0.59%	0.65%
Mar 11, 2021	23	3,721	0	24	29	3,344	7,429	7,429	0.31%	0.64%
Mar 12, 2021	38	3,759	0	24	33	3,377	6,623	6,623	0.57%	0.64%
Mar 13, 2021	34	3,793	0	24	36	3,413	6,081	6,081	0.56%	0.63%
Mar 14, 2021	25	3,818	0	24	18	3,431	4,198	4,198	0.60%	0.63%
Mar 15, 2021	14	3,832	0	24	45	3,476	5,958	5,958	0.23%	0.63%
Mar 16, 2021	44	3,876	0	24	14	3,490	6,861	6,861	0.64%	0.62%
Mar 17, 2021	37	3,913	0	24	19	3,509	6,405	6,405	0.58%	0.61%
Mar 18, 2021	44	3,957	0	24	24	3,533	7,001	7,001	0.63%	0.61%
Mar 19, 2021	43	4,000	0	24	29	3,562	6,930	6,930	0.62%	0.60%
Mar 20, 2021	41	4,041	0	24	28	3,590	7,884	7,884	0.52%	0.59%
Mar 21, 2021	42	4,083	0	24	22	3,612	6,000	6,000	0.70%	0.59%
Mar 22, 2021	23	4,106	0	24	25	3,637	7,910	7,910	0.29%	0.58%
Mar 23, 2021	24	4,130	0	24	48	3,685	7,836	7,836	0.31%	0.58%
Mar 24, 2021	50	4,180	0	24	37	3,722	8,296	8,296	0.60%	0.57%
Mar 25, 2021	33	4,211	1	25	32	3,754	6,991	6,991	0.47%	0.59%
Mar 26, 2021	26	4,237	0	25	28	3,782	7,039	7,039	0.37%	0.59%
Mar 27, 2021	23	4,260	0	25	20	3,802	7,178	7,178	0.32%	0.59%
Mar 28, 2021	35	4,295	0	25	37	3,839	5,078	5,078	0.69%	0.58%
Mar 29, 2021	17	4,312	0	25	38	3,877	8,009	8,009	0.21%	0.58%
Mar 30, 2021	57	4,369	1	26	47	3,924	7,850	7,850	0.73%	0.60%
Mar 31, 2021	35	4,404	0	26	35	3,959	6,778	6,778	0.52%	0.59%
Apr 01, 2021	40	4,444	0	26	35	3,994	6,430	6,430	0.62%	0.59%
Apr 02, 2021	42	4,486	0	26	28	4,022	6,623	6,623	0.63%	0.58%
Apr 03, 2021	59	4,545	0	26	46	4,068	6,075	6,075	0.97%	0.57%
Apr 04, 2021	45	4,590	0	26	31	4,099	6,586	6,586	0.68%	0.57%
Apr 05, 2021	70	4,660	0	26	6	4,105	8,385	8,385	0.83%	0.56%
Apr 06, 2021	64	4,724	0	26	80	4,185	8,949	8,949	0.72%	0.55%
Apr 07, 2021	88	4,812	0	26	28	4,213	8,251	8,251	1.07%	0.54%
Apr 08, 2021	64	4,876	0	26	25	4,238	8,023	8,023	0.80%	0.53%
Apr 09, 2021	69	4,945	1	27	60	4,298	8,323	8,323	0.83%	0.55%
Apr 10, 2021	68	5,013	0	27	35	4,333	7,698	7,698	0.88%	0.54%
Apr 11, 2021	60	5,073	0	27	27	4,360	6,313	6,313	0.95%	0.53%
Apr 12, 2021	35	5,180	0	27	34	4,394	8,461	8,461	0.41%	0.52%
Apr 13, 2021	82	5,190	1	28	54	4,448	9,132	9,132	0.90%	0.54%
Apr 14, 2021	73	5,263	0	28	43	4,491	8,789	8,789	0.83%	0.53%
Apr 15, 2021	74	5,337	0	28	52	4,543	7,939	7,939	0.93%	0.52%
Apr 16, 2021	73	5,410	0	28	50	4,593	7,890	7,890	0.93%	0.52%
Apr 17, 2021	53	5,463	0	28	56	4,649	7,385	7,385	0.72%	0.51%
Apr 18, 2021	53	5,516	0	28	71	4,720	6,263	6,263	0.85%	0.51%
Apr 19, 2021	67	5,583	0	28	102	4,822	7,625	7,625	0.88%	0.50%
Apr 20, 2021	86	5,669	0	28	42	4,864	9,184	9,184	0.94%	0.49%
Date	New	Total	New	Total	New	Total	New	Total	Positivity ratio	Fatality ratio
Date	Confirmed cases		Deaths		Recoveries		Number of tests		Ratios	

=== Graphs ===
==== Overview ====
Total confirmed cases Active cases Recoveries Deaths

View source data.
View source data.

==== Daily new cases ====
Cases per day, 7-day moving average

View source data.

==== Daily tests ====
Tests per day, 7-day moving average

View source data.

==== Test positivity rate ====
Test positivity rate, 7-day moving average

==== Case fatality rate ====
Case fatality rate

== Reaction ==
On 11 March 2020, North Cypriot Deputy Prime Minister and Foreign Minister Kudret Özersay said in a tweet that flights from Germany, France and Italy to North Cyprus would be suspended until 1 April 2020.

All flights to Northern Cyprus were canceled, as well as all border checkpoints along the Green Line, connecting to the Republic of Cyprus.

On 12 March 2020, the North Cypriot government shut down schools and banned mass gatherings as precautionary measures to prevent the spread of COVID-19, which the World Health Organization declared a pandemic.

All educational activities from nursery to university degree suspended in-person education. Primary and middle schools transitioned to online classes and completed 2019-2020 semester this way. Northern Cyprus has more than 20 institutions of higher education, 18 of which are universities, with nearly 100,000 international students. All higher education services were suspended and transitioned to online classes.

After 76 days of curfew and quarantine, cases were majorly reduced. After reopening international arrivals soon after, COVID-19 cases increased rapidly. By 11 September 2020, there were 541 cases.

== See also ==
- COVID-19 pandemic by country and territory
- COVID-19 pandemic in Europe
- COVID-19 pandemic in Cyprus
- COVID-19 pandemic in Turkey
