= Independence Day (Cyprus) =

National holiday in Cyprus

- Observed by: Cyprus
- Significance: Independence from the United Kingdom
- Celebrations: Festivals and military parades
- Date: 1 October
- Next time: 1 October 2026
- Frequency: Annual
- First time: 1 October 1979

The Independence Day of Cyprus (Greek: Ημέρα Ανεξαρτησίας της Κύπρου) is a national holiday observed by the Republic of Cyprus on 1 October every year. The day celebrates the independence of Cyprus from British rule on 16 August 1960, which was guaranteed by Greece, Turkey and the United Kingdom in The London and Zürich Agreements.

The holiday is celebrated by festivals and a military parade in the capital of Nicosia. The parade is composed of units from the National Guard, Greek forces in Cyprus, the police and fire services. After the national parade the president gives a traditional speech. Shops and businesses across the country may be closed in celebration and observation.

== Background ==
Cyprus was originally a colony ruled by the United Kingdom from 1878 until 1960. During the 1950s the Greek people of Cyprus began to fight for unification with Greece, deciding to fight under Ethniki Organosis Kyprion Agoniston (EOKA; /eɪˈoʊkə/; Greek: Εθνική Οργάνωσις Κυπρίων Αγωνιστών, lit. 'National Organisation of Cypriot Fighters'). The conflict lasted for four years which resulted in the British governor Sir Hugh Foot declaring Cyprus's independence. Instead of unifying with Greece, Cyprus was declared independent due to the Turkish minority groups not wanting to become an even smaller minority group under the rule of Greece.
