= COVID-19 pandemic in Cyprus =

Ongoing COVID-19 outbreak in Cyprus

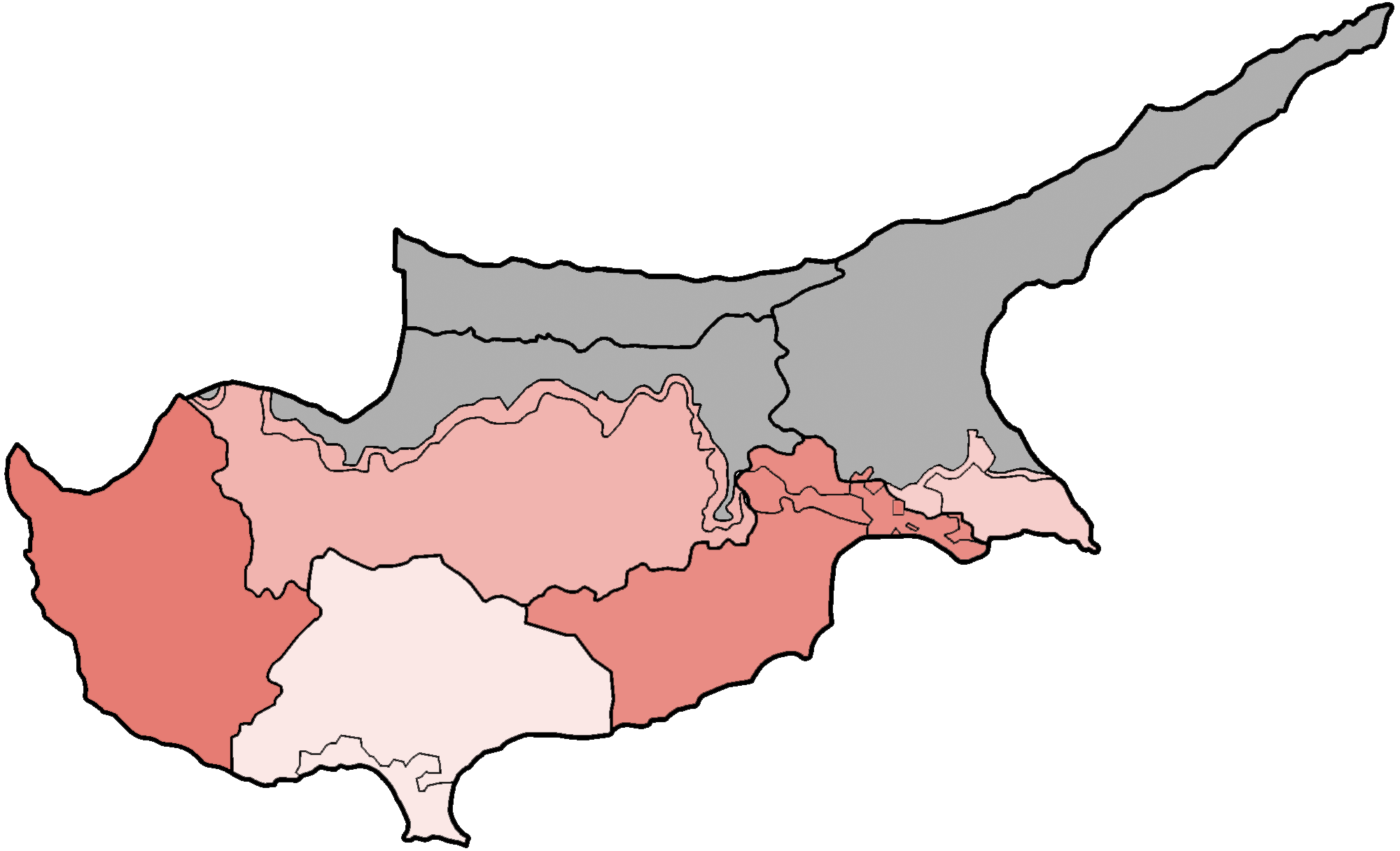
- Per capita infections in Cyprus, dated 7 May 2020
- Disease: COVID-19
- Pathogen: SARS-CoV-2
- Location: Cyprus
- Index case: Limassol and Nicosia
- Arrival date: 9 March 2020 (6 years, 4 months, 4 weeks and 2 days)
- Confirmed cases: 718,930
- Recovered: 657,086
- Deaths: 1,364
- Fatality rate: 0.19%

Government website
- covid19.cy

The COVID-19 pandemic was confirmed to have reached Cyprus on 9 March 2020. Data released by the Cypriot government includes cases in the British Overseas Territory of Akrotiri and Dhekelia, but does not include cases in Northern Cyprus due to the long-running Cyprus dispute.

== Background ==
On 12 January 2020, the World Health Organization (WHO) confirmed that a novel coronavirus was the cause of a respiratory illness in a cluster of people in Wuhan, China, which was reported to the WHO on 31 December 2019. The case fatality ratio for COVID-19 has been much lower than the 2002–2004 SARS outbreak, but the transmission has been significantly greater, with a significant total death toll. In 2021, Cyprus was leading in investment for software and data, following adoption of digital technologies during the COVID-19 pandemic.

== Timeline ==
=== 2020 ===
- On 9 March, Cyprus confirmed its first two cases: a 25-year-old man from Limassol who had returned from Italy and a 64-year-old heart surgeon from Nicosia who had returned from a medical convention in England and had been treating patients while infected.
- On 11 March, Cyprus confirmed four more cases: two people who returned from England the day before and one taxi driver from Paphos, whose grandson was also hospitalised. All three men were taken to Famagusta General Hospital. The fourth case was in self-isolation at home.
- On 12 March, four new cases were confirmed: a person who had returned from the United Kingdom and contacted the authorities after developing symptoms, a person who had returned from Italy, a person with symptoms after returning from Greece, and a person returning from Germany with no symptoms.
- On 13 March, President Nikos Anastasiadis, in a special appearance, announced the closing of all borders excepto for nationals for 15 days since 15 March.
- On 21 March, the first death was confirmed.
- On 22 April, one death, one recovery, and six new cases were confirmed.
- On 23 April, one recovery and five new cases were confirmed. A total of 148 people had recovered at the time, according to the Ministry of Health.
- On 30 April, seven new cases were confirmed. According to the Ministry of Health, a total of 296 people recovered.
- In early May, Cypriot citizens and legal residents of Cyprus who were in the UK during the first lockdown were given the option of boarding government-arranged repatriation flights back to the island from various UK airports. Those re-entering the country were required to spend two weeks in quarantine at certain hotels which had been designated and funded by the government, primarily in Paphos and Ayia Napa.
- On 16 May, a few days after some students had returned to school as part of the easing of restrictions, four new cases were confirmed in students and staff members.
- On 21 May, the lockdown ended and repatriation flights continued, with a new rule stating that those coming back to the country no longer had to quarantine upon arrival. The government also announced that airports would fully reopen on 9 June, although some flights from countries heavily affected by the virus (such as the UK and Russia, the two biggest sources of tourism income in Cyprus) would not be permitted until further notice.
- On 27 November, amidst a rapidly increasing rate of daily new cases, another partial lockdown was announced from 30 November to 14 December.
- On 9 December, it was revealed that the partial lockdown had failed to curb the rise of infections and deaths, with 7 December recording the highest daily number of deaths since the pandemic began; it was then announced that all restaurants, bars, cafes, shopping malls, schools, and churches would be closed from 11–31 December.
- On 25 December, Dr. Petros Karayiannis, a professor of microbiology and molecular virology at the University of Nicosia, urged people to trust the science behind the newly available vaccines and dismissed the misinformation and conspiracy theories surrounding them.

=== 2021 ===
- On 10 January, a new full lockdown—the country's second since the start of the pandemic—began and was scheduled to last until 31 January. Dr. Karayiannis cited a full lockdown as the only way to curb the spread of the virus and said that a rise in cases should be expected (stemming from the Christmas period) before the numbers start to come down.
- On 1 February, the January lockdown was extended while shops and barbers were allowed to reopen under strict guidelines. Measures re-implemented from the first lockdown included a night-time curfew, no more than two people from the same household leaving their home, a requirement to send text messages to a special phone number to get permission before going out, and a maximum limit of three hours outside.
- On 14 February, it was announced that an agreement had been reached between Cyprus, Greece, and Israel to allow people from each country to move freely between them without quarantining from April 1, as long as they can prove that they were fully vaccinated at least one week before travelling and agree to random tests upon arrival.
- On 1 March, one death and 288 new cases were confirmed. Restrictions began to be loosened despite a spike in infections which brought the total number of cases to 35,297. The measures included the re-opening of schools, gyms, sports facilities for Third Division football teams, and nature trails for exercise purposes. The decision was made to continue easing restrictions due to the vaccination program rolling out and the advice of health experts, who said hospitals on the island were "stable and not overburdened".
- On 5 March, deputy tourism minister Savvas Perdios announced that Cyprus would allow tourists from the UK into the country from May 1 as long as they prove that they were fully vaccinated at least one week before travelling and agree to random tests upon arrival, despite the UK government's current plan preventing foreign travel for its citizens until May 17.
- On 12 March, two deaths and 383 new cases were confirmed. Despite this, health minister Konstantinos Ioannou announced that restaurants will reopen on 16 March but will only be able to seat customers in outdoor areas, while the start time for the nightly curfew will change from 9 pm to 11 pm. Dr. Constantinos Tsioutis, the assistant professor of internal medicine & infection prevention and control at the European University Cyprus, held a press conference alongside three other doctors to say that the recent rise in the number of hospital admissions is "worrisome" and that "a plan is in place" to supply extra hospital beds if necessary.
- On 14 March, two deaths and 374 new cases were confirmed. This day also saw Cypriots gathering to celebrate the annual Limassol Carnival Festival, despite it being cancelled, as they were allowed to have a "mini parade" in which they remained in their cars and followed the route that the parade would usually take. Later in the day, more people arrived and the event turned into a street party, with most attendees ignoring social distancing rules and not wearing masks. Police eventually intervened. Limassol mayor Nicos Nicolaides said that he was "saddened and disappointed" by the behaviour of the attendees. 28 people and two businesses were fined by police.
- On 16 March, the ministry of health introduced new rules for the recently re-opened restaurants and cafés, stating that customers have to wear their masks between bites of food and that live performances of Greek music which might make people dance were banned; later that day, they reversed these new rules after a backlash from people deeming them "silly and unenforceable".
- On 18 March, it was revealed that pandemic-induced travel restrictions had caused the island to receive only 4.8% of the tourist numbers it usually sees in February.
- On 20 March, the ministry of health announced that the Alpha variant of the virus was "more widespread than ever" in Cyprus, appearing in all 45 positive samples that were sent off for examination.
- On 23 March, it was revealed that 2020 had seen the island receiving only 15% of its usual yearly tourist numbers.
- On 12 April, the ministry of health announced that Cyprus ranked first in the EU in terms of how many COVID-19 tests were being carried out, had the second lowest rate of positive cases in the EU, and one of the lowest mortality rates in the EU.
- On 13 April, it was revealed that people in Cyprus were becoming more "reluctant" to take a COVID-19 vaccine, causing concern about a delay in the national vaccination programme; of the 7,500 available vaccination appointments in one unnamed area, less than 1,500 were taken. Later that day, it was announced that police had issued 163 fines in the past 24 hours to people breaching pandemic restrictions.
- On 26 April, total cases had surpassed 60,000; the country's fourth lockdown thus began in an attempt to combat a spike in infections, and ended on May 9. The day before the lockdown began, hundreds of protesters gathered outside the Cyprus Broadcasting Corporation building in Nicosia.
- On 20 May, the ministry of health was put on alert when cases of both the Beta and Delta variants of the virus were discovered in the country.
- On 21 May, it was announced that 47% of the population had received their first dose of the vaccine, while 17% had received their second dose and were thus fully vaccinated.
- On 4 June, the number of total cases had risen to 72,709.
- On 19 September, the number of total cases had risen to 118,957, while total deaths amounted to 534 with a total of 90,755 recoveries.
- On 7 October, health minister Michalis Hadjipantelas announced that "small relaxations" of COVID measures will be implemented the following day; these include allowing unvaccinated people to enter stadiums, cinemas, and theatres if they can provide proof of a negative PCR test. He also said that they are set to approve an increase in the number of individuals allowed in indoor and outdoor spaces.

=== 2022 ===
- On 27 May, two deaths and 1,774 new cases were confirmed.
- On 28 October, three deaths and 2,821 new cases were confirmed.

== Impact ==
Despite pressure from local businesses, health minister Constantinos Ioannou said in July 2020 that Cyprus would not lift entry restrictions on its largest tourism markets (namely the United Kingdom and Russia) unless it were safe to do because these countries had some of the highest rates of the virus in the world at that time. He said that it would not be possible to implement mass testing to screen all passengers from high-risk countries upon their arrival in Cyprus because quarantine facilities and hospitals would not be able to accommodate the expected number of infected people. By late July, Cyprus had reported that most of the new cases on the island had come from travellers. Estimates for August tourist arrivals were 18% of the previous year's arrivals.

To determine whether arrivals from certain countries would be quarantined or otherwise restricted upon entry to Cyprus, the country assessed the Schengen Area and other countries based on factors such as the number of new diagnoses and mortality rates per 100,000 inhabitants. The Category A countries were considered low risk; arrivals from Category A countries, including some non-European countries like Canada, Japan, and South Korea, did not have any restrictions placed on their entry. Category B countries were considered less certain than Category A and included France, Italy, and Spain. Passengers arriving from Category B countries were required to undergo a health examination upon arrival and self-quarantine until the results returned. The Category B restrictions also applied to citizens and legal residents of Cyprus. Category C countries were considered an increased risk and entry was restricted unless certain conditions were met; arrivals could take a COVID-19 test upon arrival or present an RT-PCR certificate, which would prove negative test results within the 72 hours before their arrival.

== Statistics ==
=== Total confirmed cases, recoveries, and deaths ===
Total confirmed cases Total recoveries Total deaths

=== New cases per day ===
New cases per day

== See also ==
- COVID-19 pandemic in Northern Cyprus
- COVID-19 pandemic by country and territory
- COVID-19 pandemic in Europe
