= S. carnea =

S. carnea may refer to:

- Salvia carnea, a flowering plant
- Sarcina carnea, a cocci bacteria
- Savia carnea, a flowering plant
- Scilla carnea, a herbaceous perennial
- Sparganophilus carnea, a mud-dwelling earthworm
