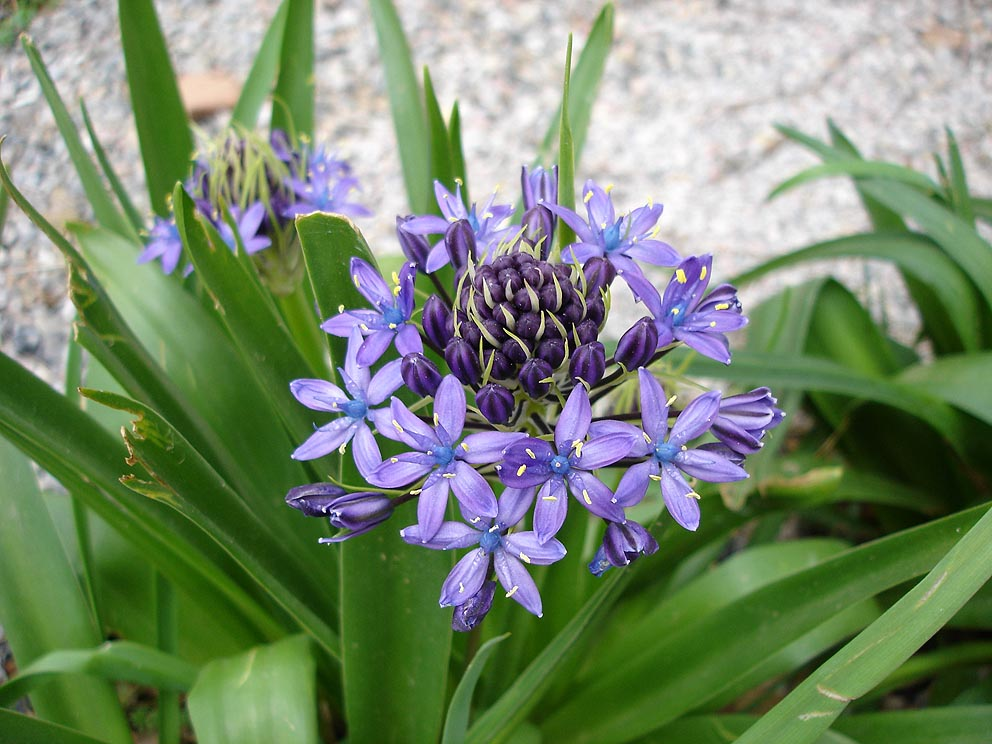

Scientific classification
- Kingdom: Plantae
- Clade: Tracheophytes
- Clade: Angiosperms
- Clade: Monocots
- Order: Asparagales
- Family: Asparagaceae
- Subfamily: Scilloideae
- Genus: Scilla
- Species: S. peruviana

Binomial name
- Scilla peruviana L.

Synonyms
- Many, including: Oncostema peruvianum (L.) Speta; Caloscilla elegans Jord. & Fourr.; Hyacinthus peruvianus (L.) Vilm.; Melomphis peruviana (L.) Raf.

= Scilla peruviana =

Portuguese squill

Species of flowering plant

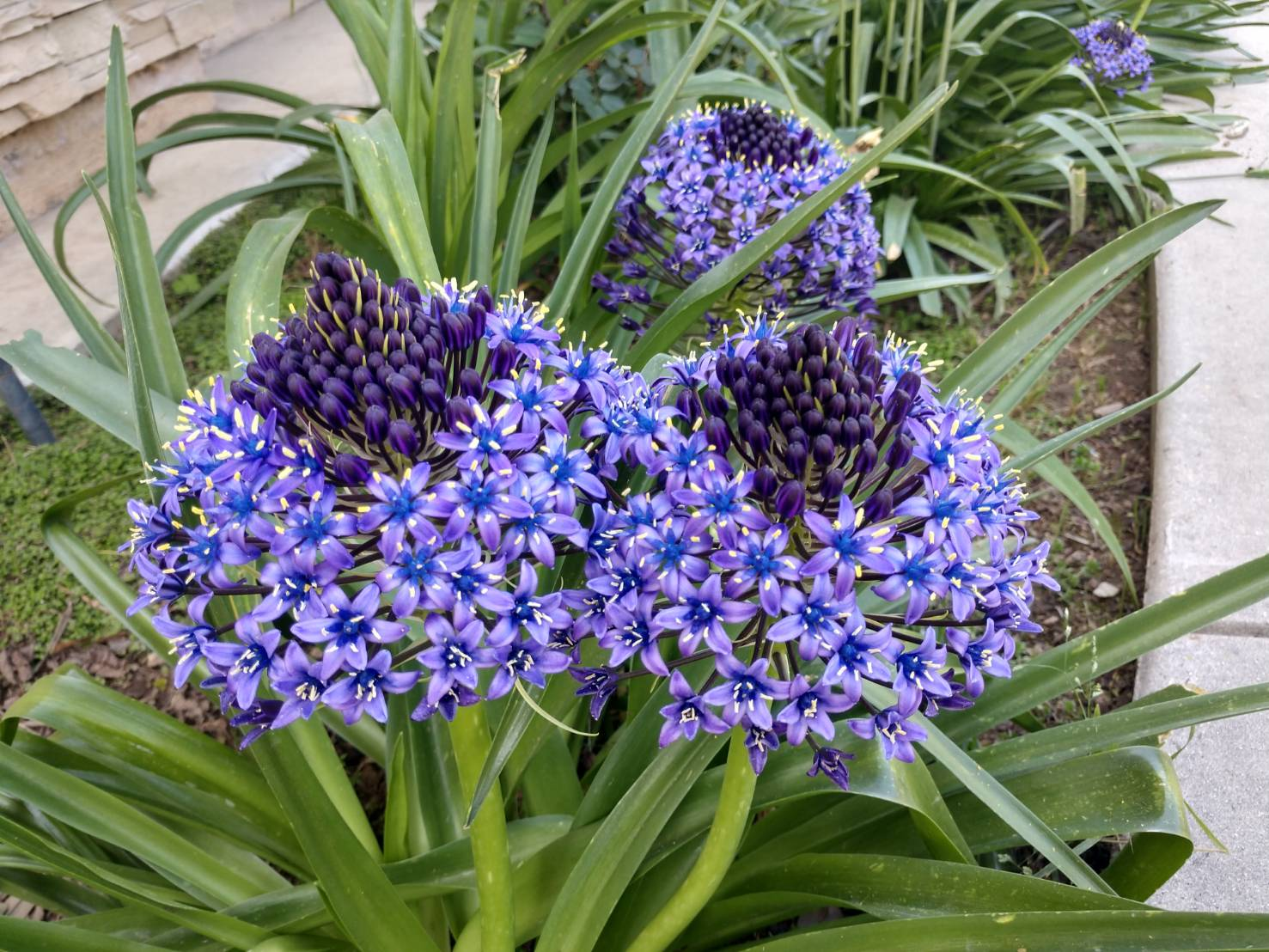

Scilla peruviana (synonyms including Oncostema peruvianum (Note: See § Names and taxonomy)), the Cuban lily, Peruvian hyacinth (Note: S. peruviana is closely related to the hyacinths and was previously classified in the genus Hyacinthus.) or Portuguese squill, is a species of Scilla native to the western Mediterranean region in Iberia, Italy, and northwest Africa. It is a bulb-bearing herbaceous perennial plant. The bulb is 6–8 cm in diameter, white with a covering of brown scales. The leaves are linear, 20–60 cm long and 1–4 cm broad, with 5-15 leaves produced each spring. The flowering stem is 15–40 cm tall, bearing a dense pyramidal raceme of 40-100 flowers; each flower is blue, 1–2 cm in diameter, with six tepals. The foliage dies down in summer, re-appearing in the autumn.

== Names and taxonomy ==
Although the epithet peruviana means "from Peru" and a common name is "Cuban lily", Scilla peruviana is strictly a western Mediterranean species. Linnaeus named the species in 1753, citing an earlier name given to the plant by Carolus Clusius, Hyacinthus stellatus peruanus. Clusius mentioned the species as growing in the Antwerp garden of a certain Everardus Munichoven, who reportedly got the plants from Peru. The error was already mentioned in 1804 in Curtis's Botanical Magazine. There is no reliable source for the story about a ship named Peru, shipping plants from Spain to Northern Europe, misleading Clusius or Linnaeus into giving the erroneous name.

The status of the genus Scilla has been in flux, with some authorities splitting it into a number of smaller genera based on karyological analysis and the principles of monophyly. A scheme by Franz Speta names S. peruviana as Oncostema peruviana, but this changed has not been widely accepted.

== Cultivation and uses ==
It is commonly grown as an ornamental plant for its spring flowers; several cultivars are available ranging in colour from white to light or dark blue, or violet. In some areas it is also known as hyacinth-of-Peru, Cuban-lily, or Peruvian scilla.

It is not entirely hardy, suffering from prolonged frost. The best environment is a warm mediterranean climate similar to its native habitat.

== See also ==
- List of Scilla species
