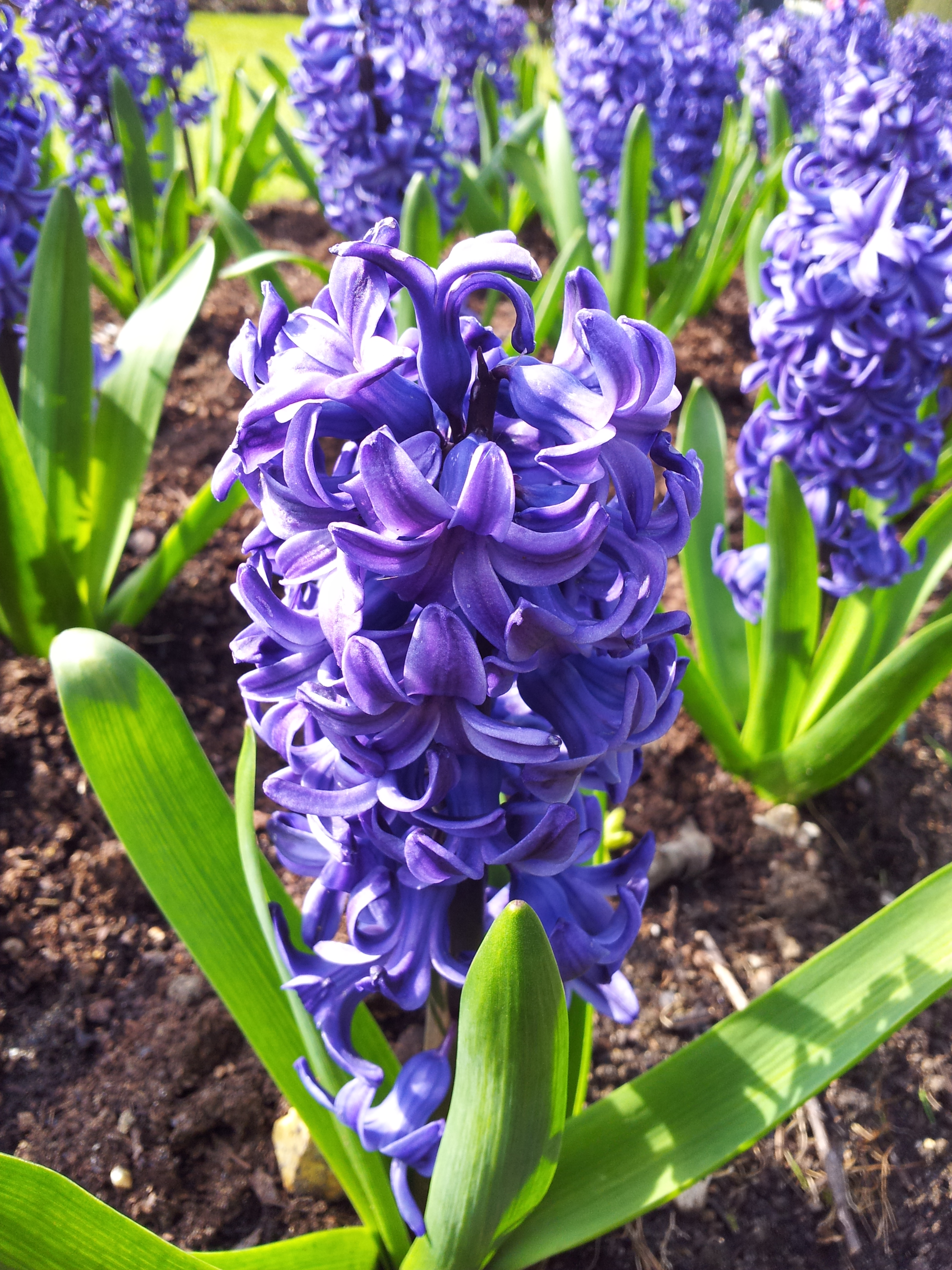
- Cultivar of Hyacinthus orientalis

Scientific classification
- Kingdom: Plantae
- Clade: Tracheophytes
- Clade: Angiosperms
- Clade: Monocots
- Order: Asparagales
- Family: Asparagaceae
- Subfamily: Scilloideae
- Genus: Hyacinthus; Tourn. ex L.

Type species
- Hyacinthus orientalis

Species
- See text

= Hyacinth =

Genus of flowering plants

Hyacinthus (/ˌhaɪəˈsɪnθəs/) is a genus of bulbous herbs and spring-blooming perennials. They are fragrant flowering plants in the family Asparagaceae, subfamily Scilloideae and are commonly called hyacinths (/ˈhaɪəsɪnθs/). The genus is native predominantly to the Eastern Mediterranean region from the south of Turkey to the Palestine region, although naturalized more widely.

The name comes from Greek mythology: Hyacinth was killed by Zephyrus, the god of the west wind, jealous of his love for Apollo. He then transformed the drops of Hyacinth's blood into flowers.

Several species of Brodiaea, Scilla, and other plants that have flower clusters borne along the stalk that were formerly classified in the Liliaceae family also have common names with the word "hyacinth" in them. Hyacinths should also not be confused with the genus Muscari, which are commonly known as grape hyacinths.

== Description ==
Hyacinthus grows from bulbs, each producing around 4-6 narrow untoothed leaves and 1-3 spikes or racemes of flowers. In wild species, the flowers are widely spaced, with as few as 2 per raceme in H. litwinovii and typically 6-8 in H. orientalis which grows to a height of 15–20 cm (6–8 in). Cultivars of H. orientalis have much denser flower spikes and are generally more robust.

== Taxonomy ==
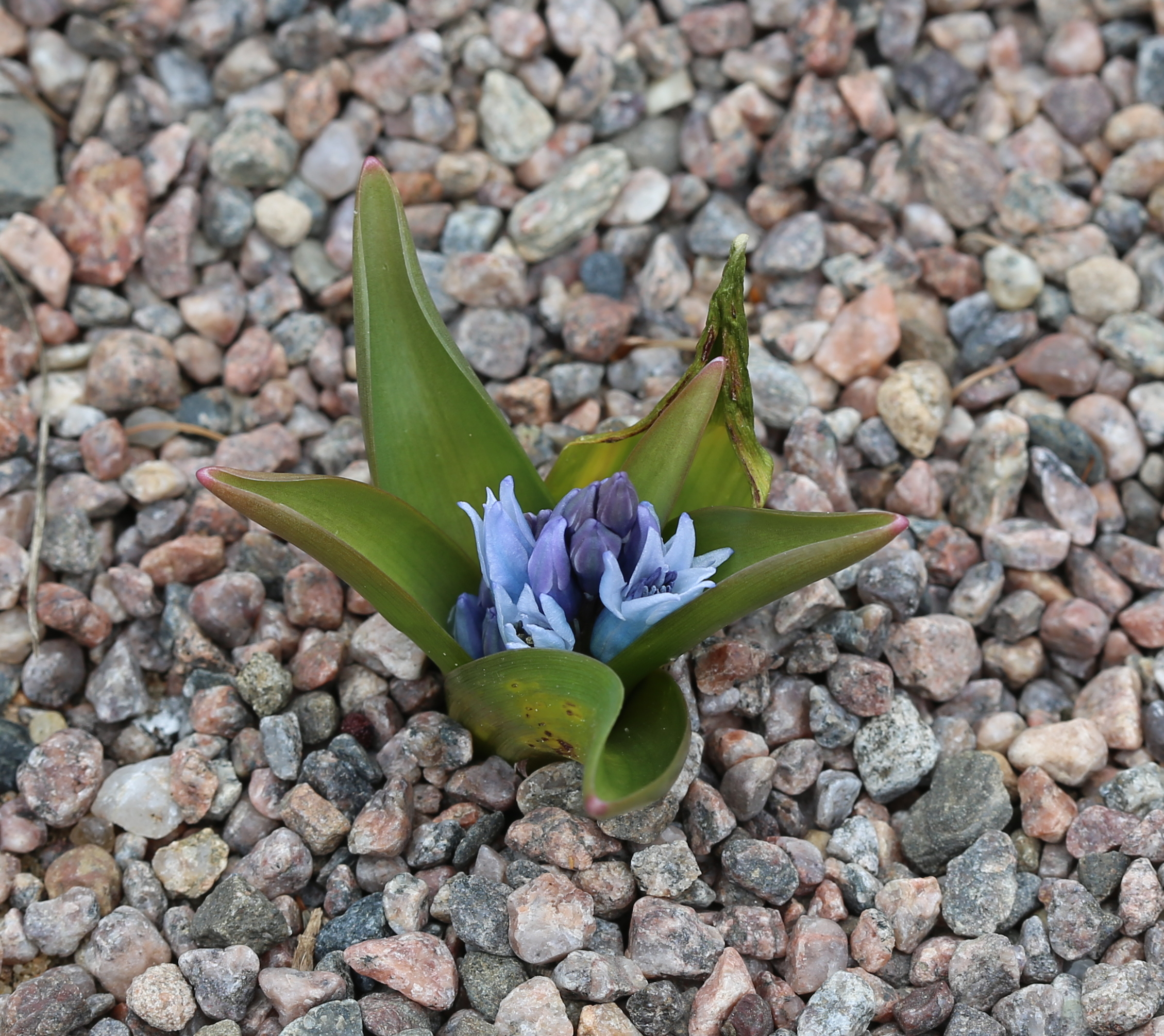
Hyacinthus transcaspicus

The genus name Hyacinthus was attributed to Joseph Pitton de Tournefort when used by Carl Linnaeus in 1753. It is derived from a Greek name used for a plant by Homer, ὑάκινθος (hyákinthos), the flowers supposedly having grown up from the blood of a youth of this name killed by the god Zephyr out of jealousy. The original wild plant known as hyakinthos to Homer has been identified with Scilla bifolia, among other possibilities. Linnaeus defined the genus Hyacinthus widely to include species now placed in other genera of the subfamily Scilloideae, such as Muscari (e.g. his Hyacinthus botryoides) and Hyacinthoides (e.g. his Hyacinthus non-scriptus).

Hyacinthus was formerly the type genus of the separate family Hyacinthaceae; prior to that, the genus was placed in the lily family Liliaceae.

=== Species ===
Three species are placed within the genus Hyacinthus:

- Hyacinthus litwinovii – north-east Iran to southern Turkmenistan
- Hyacinthus orientalis - Iraq, Lebanon, Syria, Israel, Turkey; common, Dutch or garden hyacinth
- Hyacinthus transcaspicus – north-east Iran to southern Turkmenistan

Some authorities place H. litwonovii and H. transcaspicus in the related genus Hyacinthella, which would make Hyacinthus a monotypic genus.

More recently, Hall et al. (2026) supported the transfer of H. litwinovii and H. transcaspicus to the closely related genus Fessia, based on their consistent placement within Fessia in nuclear and plastid phylogenies, together with morphological, chromosomal and geographical evidence.

== Distribution ==
The genus Hyacinthus is considered native to the eastern Mediterranean from southern Turkey to the region of Palestine, including Lebanon and Syria, and on through Iraq and Iran to Turkmenistan. It is widely naturalized elsewhere, including Europe (Bulgaria, Cyprus, France, Greece, Italy, the Netherlands, Sardinia, Sicily and former Yugoslavia), North America (California, Pennsylvania, Texas), central Mexico, the Caribbean (Cuba, Haiti) and Korea.

== Cultivation ==
The Dutch, or common hyacinth, of house and garden culture (H. orientalis, native to Southwest Asia) was so popular in the 18th century that over 2,000 cultivars were grown in the Netherlands, its chief commercial producer. This hyacinth has a single dense spike of fragrant flowers in shades of red, blue, white, orange, pink, violet or yellow. A form of the common hyacinth is the less hardy and smaller blue- or white-petalled Roman hyacinth. Hyacinthus orientalis grows best in moderately fertile, well-drained soil. It tolerates partial shade, although flowering is generally better in full sun.

== Toxicity ==
The inedible bulbs contain oxalic acid and may cause mild skin irritation. Protective gloves are recommended when handling.

Some members of the plant subfamily Scilloideae are commonly called hyacinths but are not members of the genus Hyacinthus and are edible; one example is the tassel hyacinth, which forms part of the cuisine of some Mediterranean countries.

== Culture ==
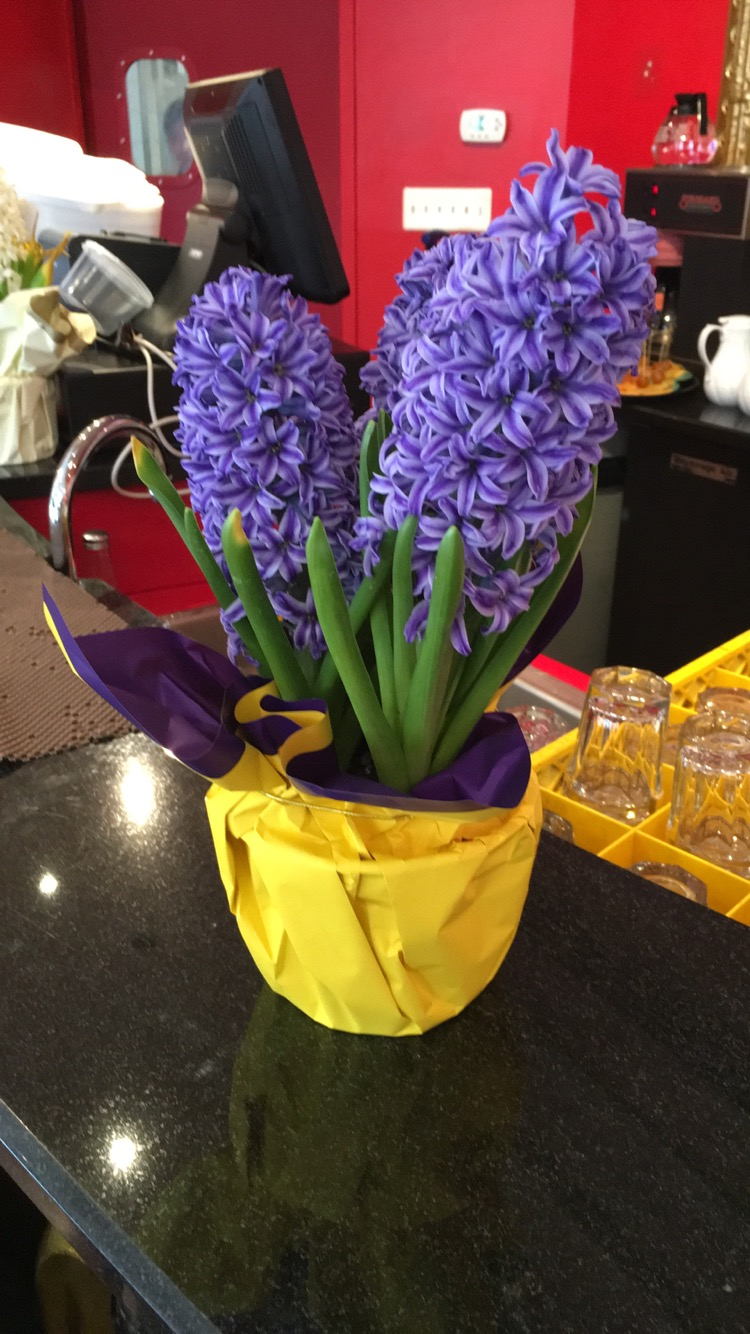
Nowruz Sonbol (Hyacinth)

Hyacinths are often associated with spring and rebirth. The hyacinth flower is used in the Haft-Seen table setting for the Persian New Year celebration, Nowruz, held at the spring equinox. The Persian word for hyacinth is سنبل (sonbol), meaning 'cluster'.

The name ὑάκινθος (hyakinthos) was used in Ancient Greece for at least two distinct plants, which have variously been identified as Scilla bifolia or Orchis quadripunctata and Consolida ajacis (larkspur). Plants known by this name were sacred to Aphrodite.

In Roman Catholic tradition, H. orientalis represents prudence, constancy, desire of heaven, and peace of mind.

The hyacinth appears in the first section of T. S. Eliot's The Waste Land during a conversation between the narrator and the "hyacinth girl" that takes place in the spring.

"You gave me hyacinths first a year ago;
They called me the hyacinth girl."
—Yet when we came back, late, from the Hyacinth garden,
Your arms full, and your hair wet, I could not
Speak, and my eyes failed, I was neither
Living nor dead, and I knew nothing,
Looking into the heart of light, the silence.

American rock band The Doors released a song entitled "Hyacinth House" which appeared on their 1971 album L.A. Woman, the last to feature lead singer Jim Morrison.

== Colour ==
The colour of the blue flower hyacinth plant varies between 'mid-blue', violet blue and bluish purple. Within this range can be found Persenche, which is an American color name (probably from French), for a hyacinth hue. The colour analysis of Persenche is 73% ultramarine, 9% red and 18% white.

== Unicode ==
Character information
Preview	🪻	
Unicode name	HYACINTH	
Encodings	decimal	hex
Unicode	129723	U+1FABB
UTF-8	240 159 170 187	F0 9F AA BB
UTF-16	55358 57019	D83E DEBB
Numeric character reference	&#129723;	&#x1FABB;

== Gallery ==
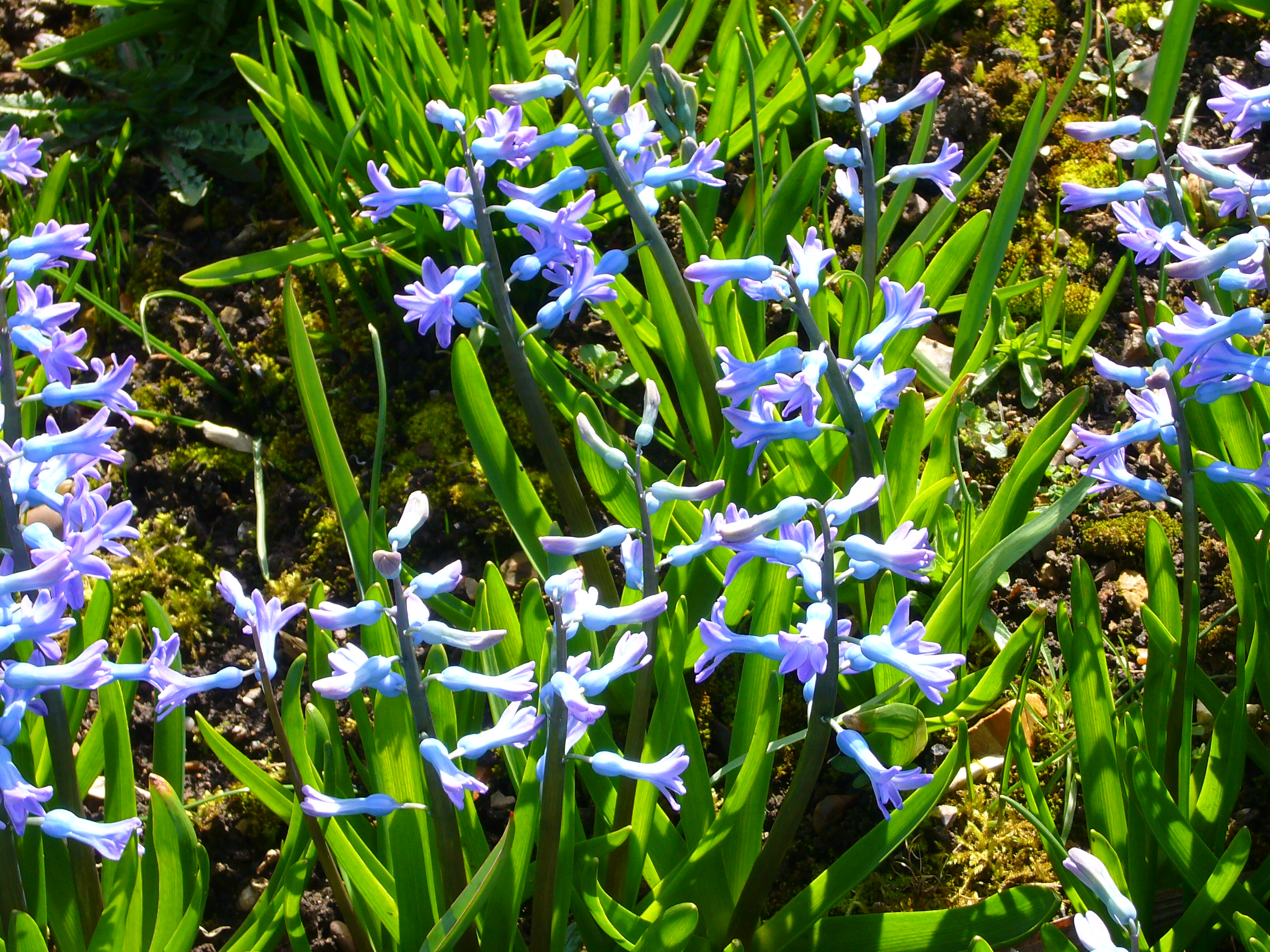
Wild-type Hyacinthus orientalis in cultivation

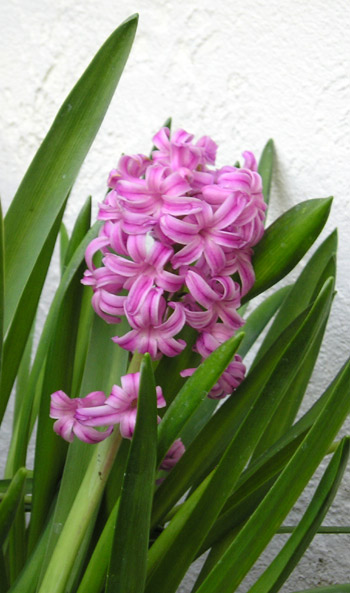
Pink cultivar

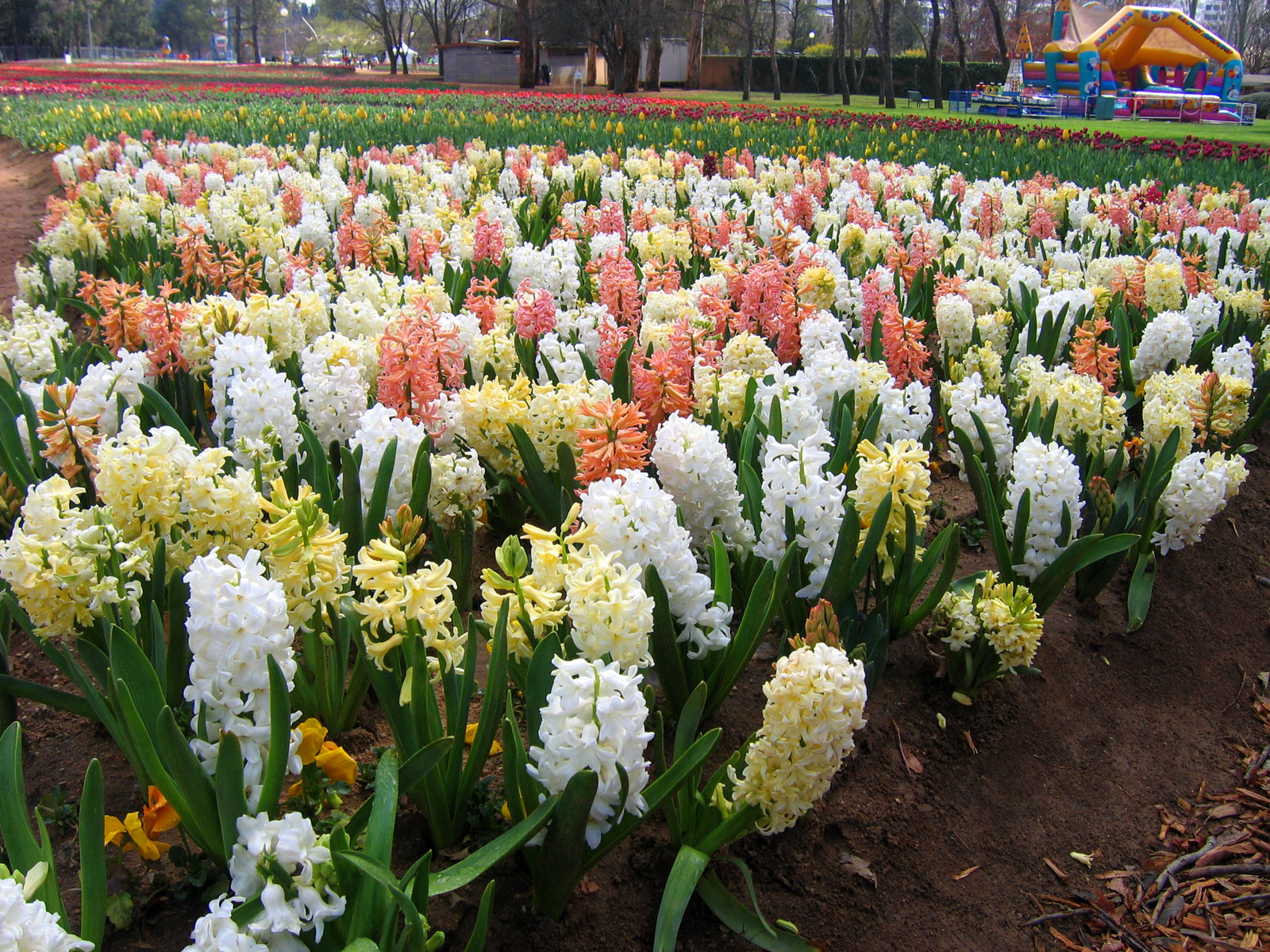
Hyacinth cultivars in Floriade, Canberra

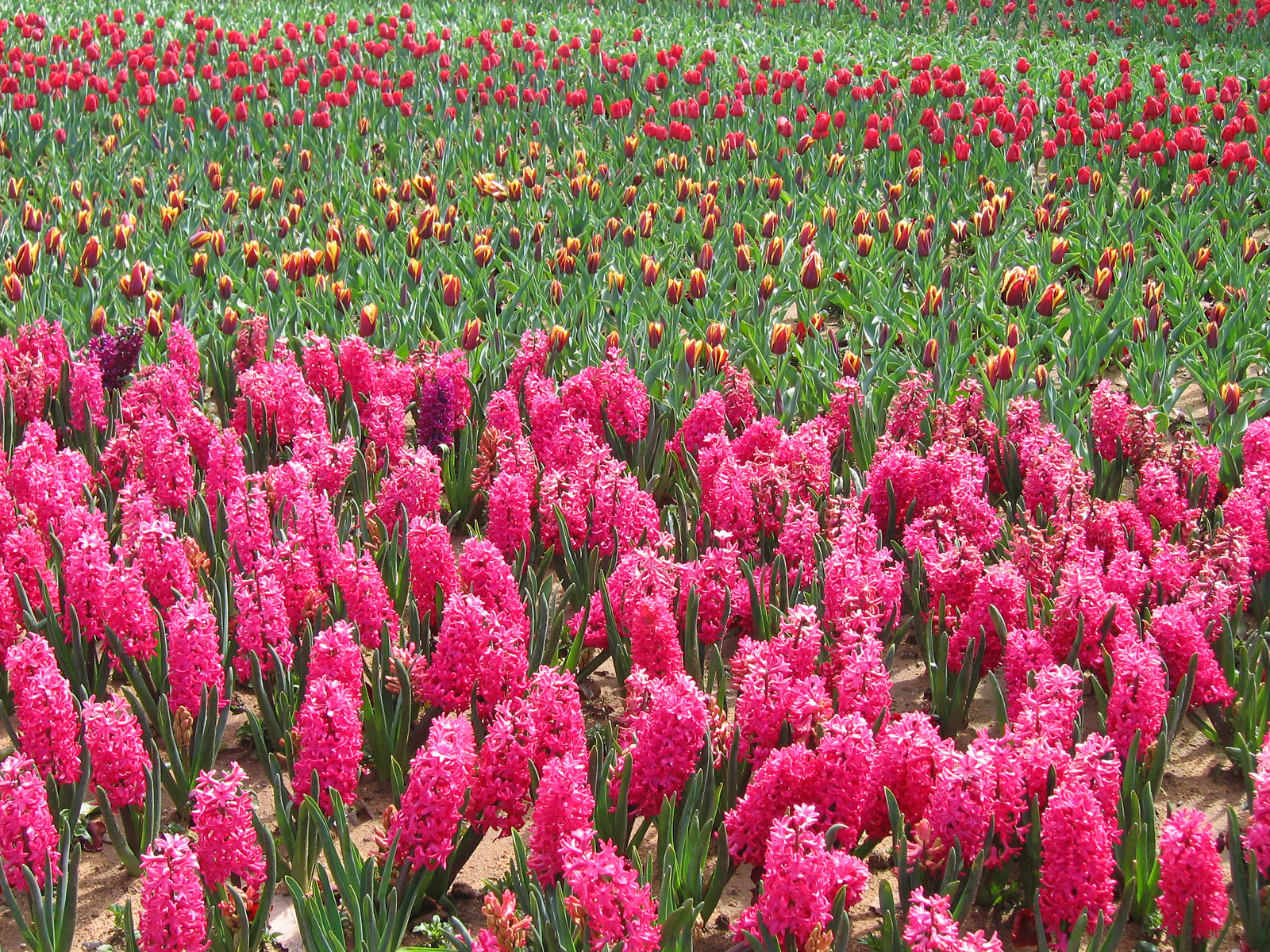
Hyacinth cultivars in Floriade, Canberra

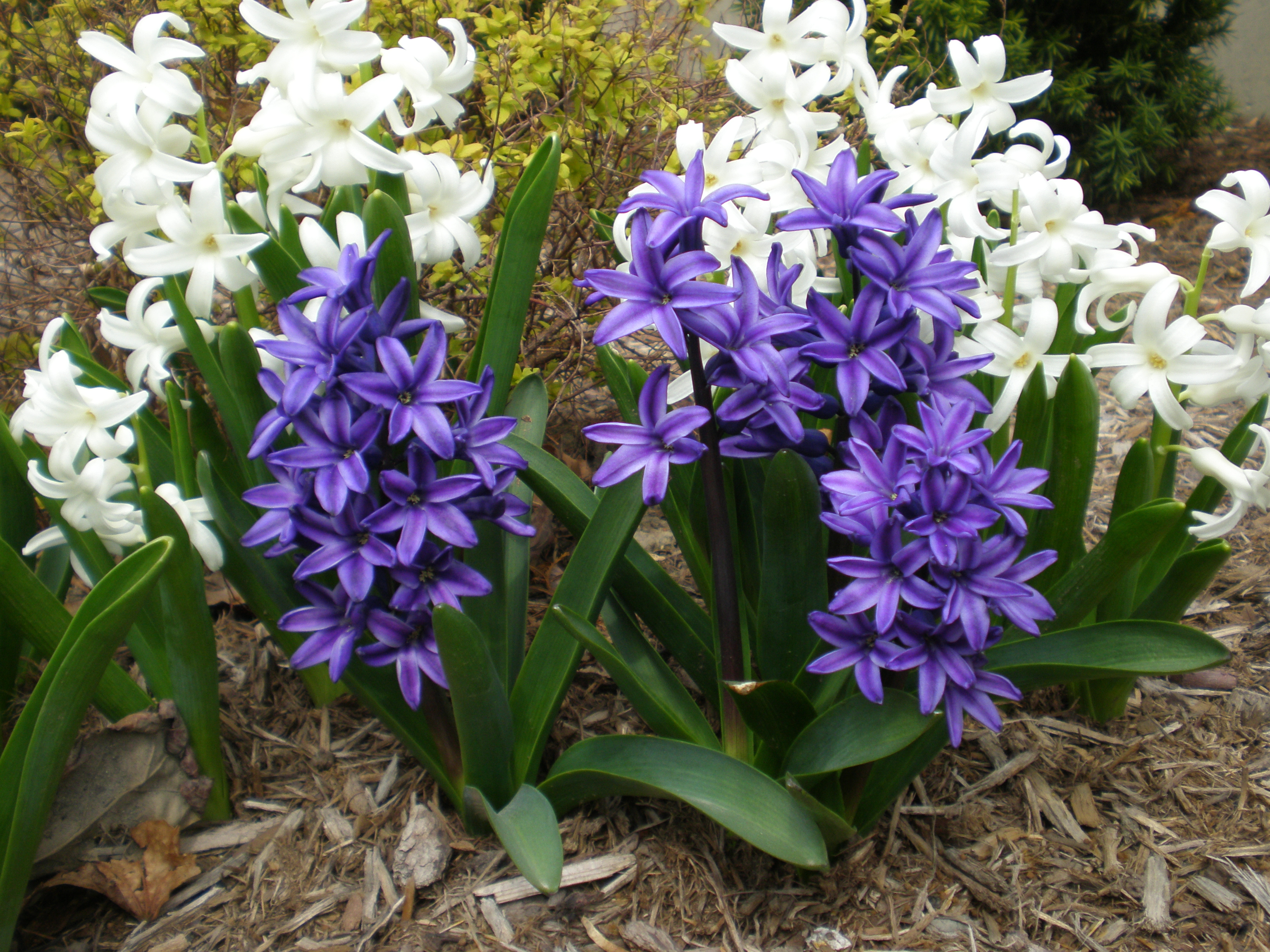
White and purple hyacinth cultivars in Detroit, Michigan

Young boy picking hyacinths in Normandy in France

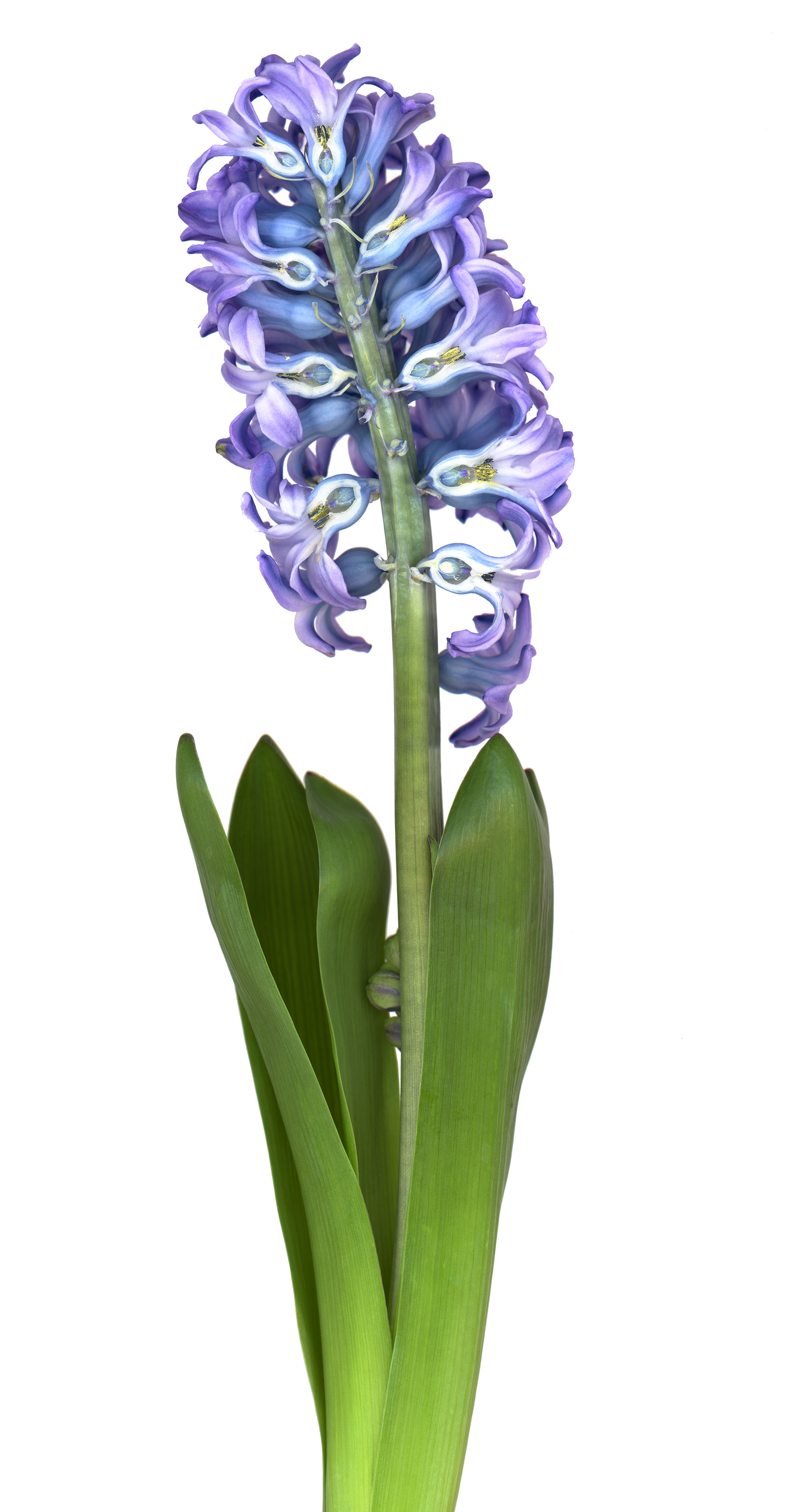
Cross section of Hyacinth orientalis cultivar

== See also ==
- Tekhelet - meaning "bluish violet" or "blue" in Hebrew, was translated as hyakinthos (Greek: ὑακίνθος, "hyacinth").
