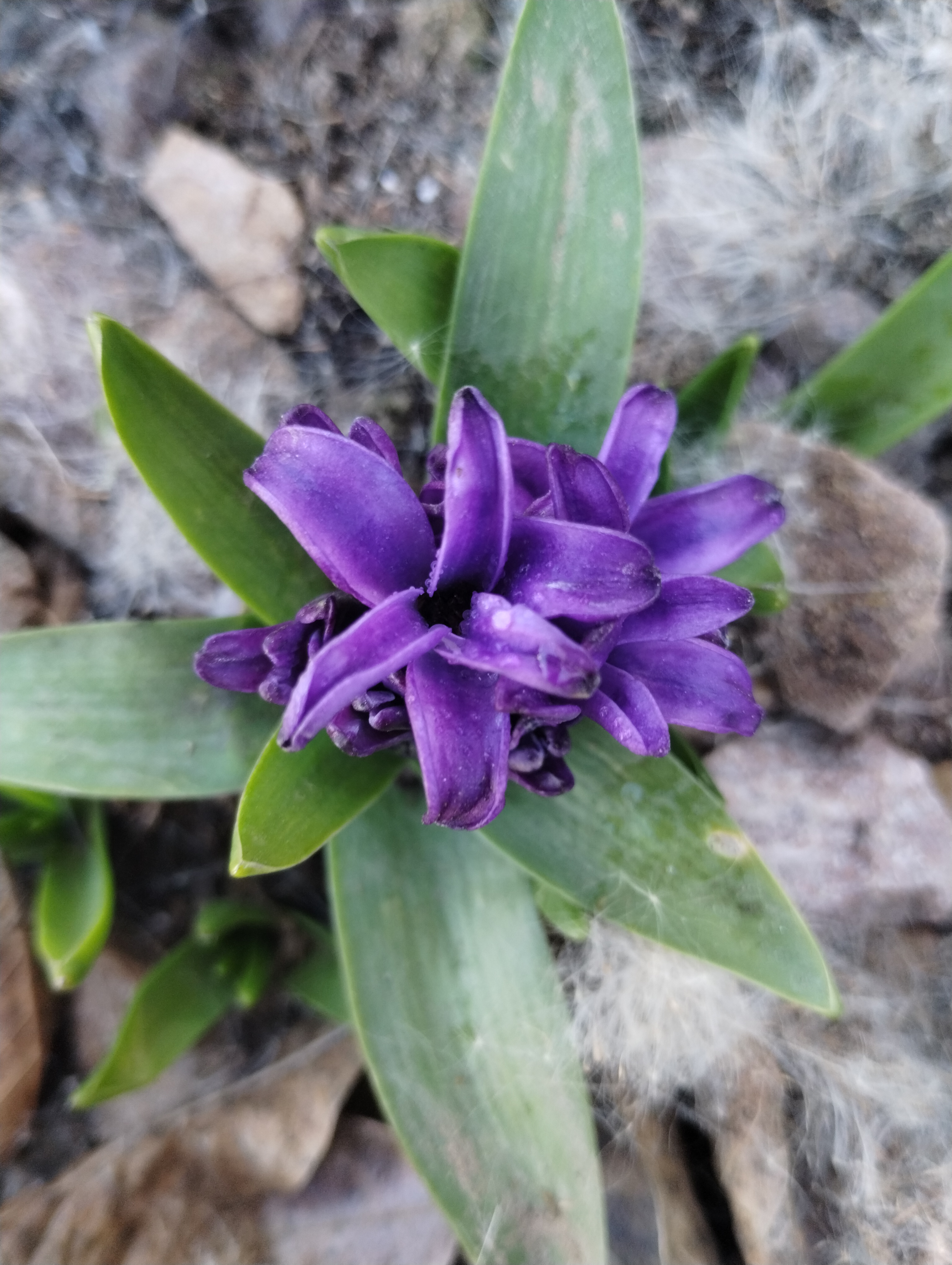

Scientific classification
- Kingdom: Plantae
- Clade: Tracheophytes
- Clade: Angiosperms
- Clade: Monocots
- Order: Asparagales
- Family: Asparagaceae
- Subfamily: Scilloideae
- Genus: Hyacinthus
- Species: H. orientalis

Binomial name
- Hyacinthus orientalis L.

Synonyms
- Hyacinthus albulus Jord.; Hyacinthus brumalis Haw. ex G.Don; Hyacinthus modestus Jord. & Fourr.; Hyacinthus praecox Jord.; Hyacinthus provincialis Jord.; Hyacinthus rigidulus Jord. & Fourr.; Scilla coronaria Salisb.

= Hyacinthus orientalis =

Species of flowering plant

Hyacinthus orientalis, the common hyacinth, garden hyacinth or Dutch hyacinth, is a species of flowering plant in the family Asparagaceae, subfamily Scilloideae. It is native to western Asia, from southern Turkey, through Syria and Lebanon to northern Israel. It was introduced to Europe in the 16th century. It is widely cultivated everywhere in the temperate world for its strongly fragrant flowers which appear exceptionally early in the season, and frequently forced to flower at Christmas time.

== Description ==
It is a bulbous plant, with a 3–7 cm (1.2–2.8 in) diameter bulb. The leaves are strap-shaped, 15–35 cm (5.9–13.8 in) long and 1–3 cm (0.39–1.18 in) broad, with a soft, succulent texture, and produced in a basal whorl. The flowering stem is a raceme, which grows to 20–35 cm (7.9–13.8 in) (rarely to 45 cm (18 in)) tall, bearing 2–50 fragrant purple flowers 2–3.5 cm long with a tubular, six-lobed perianth.

== Mythology ==
In Greek mythology, Hyacinthus was a young man admired by Apollo and Zephyr, but killed by a discus by Zephyr when Apollo and Hyacinthus were playing the game in a jealous rage between the two gods; a flower was allegedly named after him when it sprang from his blood. However, Theophrastus describes both a cultivated and a wild plant called ὑάκινθος (hyakinthos), neither of which are considered to be the modern hyacinth.

== Reproduction ==
The reproduction of the plant in cultivation can be done easily by dividing the newly appeared bulbs from the main plant. In nature, this method is also used by the hyacinth, but the plant also has a specific kind of reproduction by seeds.

The plant is pollinated by different insects such as honey bees. The flowers are very fragrant and attract the insects by rewarding them with nectar.

After flowering, the ripening of the seed capsules begins. They are fleshy, spherical structures. When the capsules reach maturity, they get dried and split into three parts. Each part has two subdivisions and contains a different quantity of seeds. The seeds are black grains with one white elaiosome of variable size. The seeds are dispersed through myrmecochory; that is, ants find the seeds and take them into their burrows, where they use the elaiosome for food. There, the seeds can germinate.

== Cultivation ==
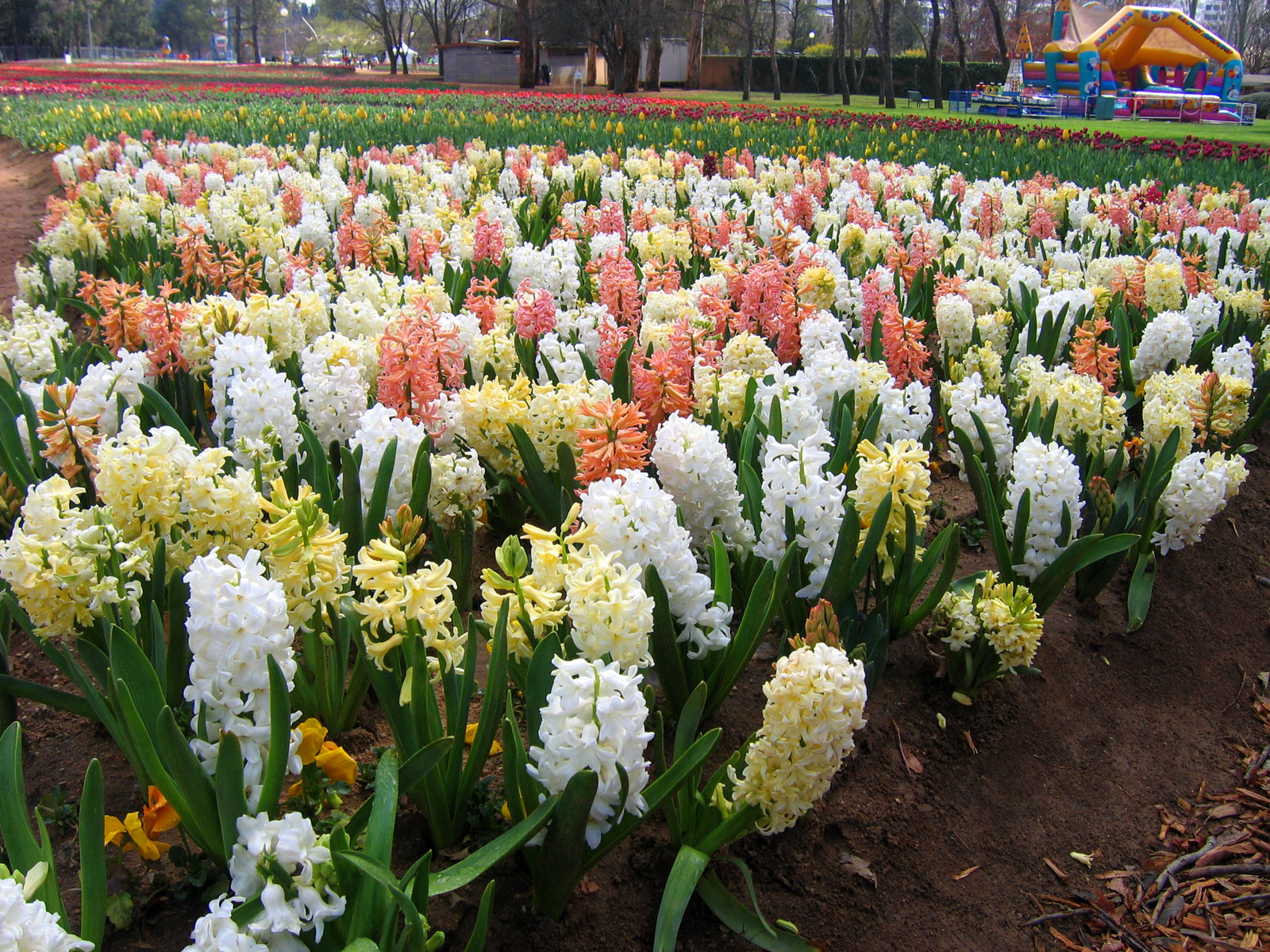
Hyacinth cultivars, showing many of the available colors

H. orientalis has a long history of cultivation as an ornamental plant, grown across the Mediterranean region, and later France (where it is used in perfumery), the Netherlands (a major centre of cultivation) and elsewhere.

It flowers in the early spring, growing best in full sun to part shade in well-drained, but not dry, soil. It requires a winter dormancy period, and will only persist in cold-weather regions. It is grown for the clusters of strongly fragrant, brightly coloured flowers. Over 2,000 cultivars have been selected and named, with flower colour in shades of blue, white, pale yellow, pink, red or purple; most cultivars have also been selected for denser flower spikes than the wild type, bearing 40–100 or more flowers on each spike.

=== Cultivars ===
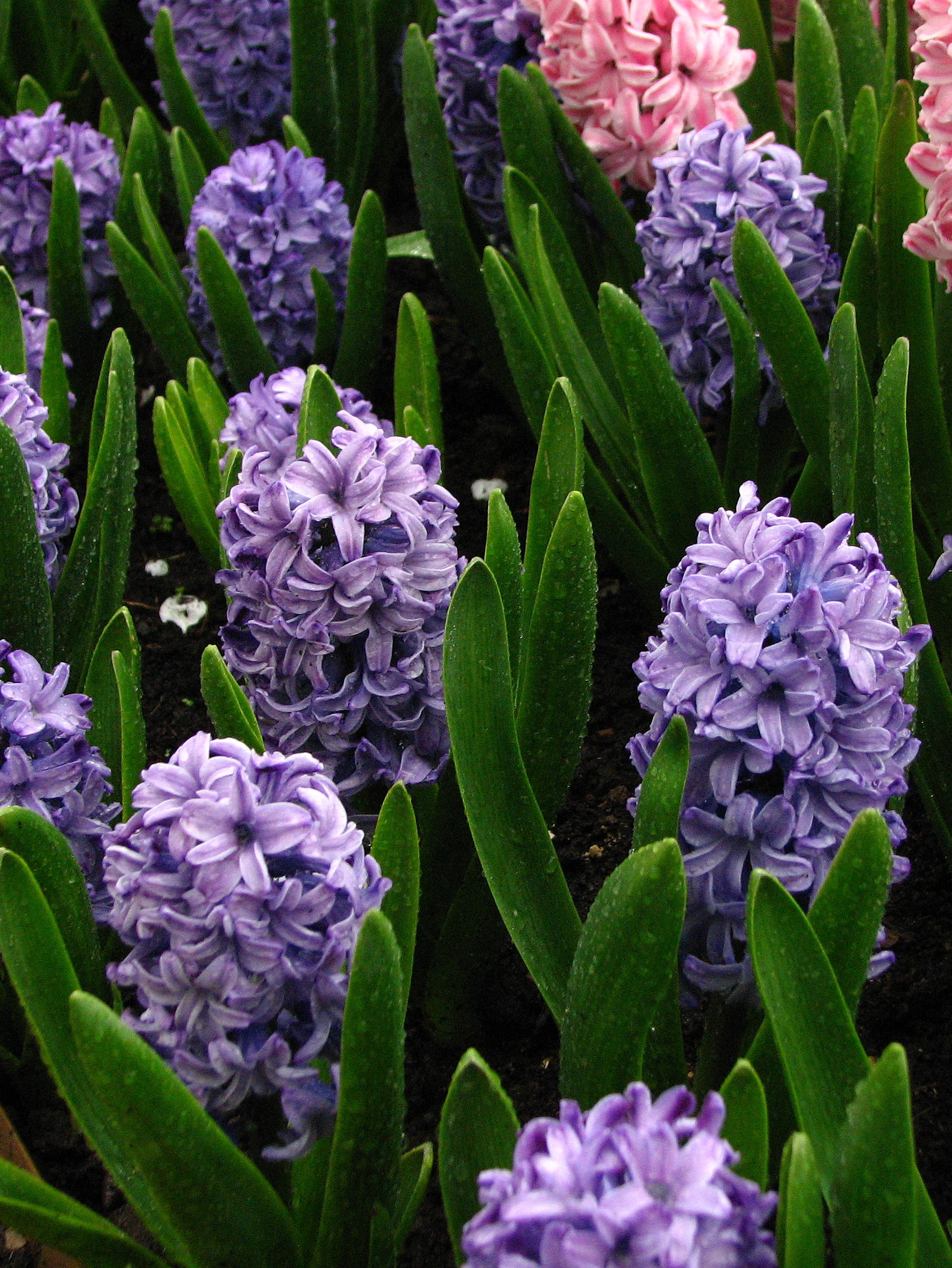
’Delft Blue’

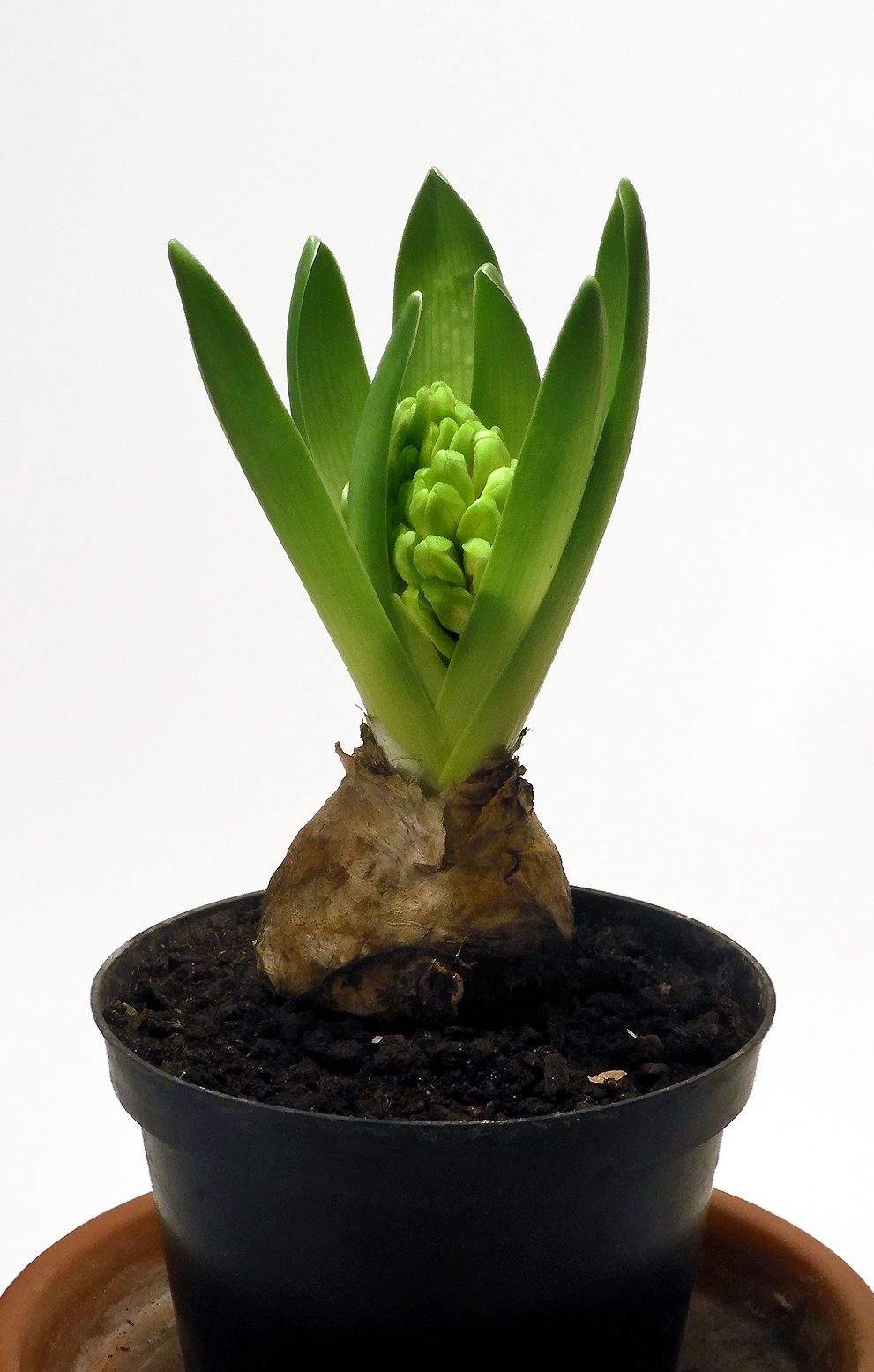
Hyacinth bulb

The following cultivars have gained the Royal Horticultural Society's Award of Garden Merit:-

- 'Aida' (deep blue)
- 'Anna Marie' (pink)
- 'Blue Festival' (pale blue)
- 'Blue Jacket' (blue)
- 'Chicago' (violet blue)
- 'City of Haarlem' (cream)
- 'Delft Blue' (blue)
- 'Fairly' (white)
- 'Gipsy Queen' (salmon pink)
- 'Jan Bos' (deep pink)
- 'L'Innocence' (white)
- 'Miss Saigon' (deep pink)
- 'Ostara' (blue)
- 'Paul Hermann' (mauve-pink)
- 'Royal Navy' (dark blue)
- 'Yellow Queen' (cream yellow)

=== Forcing ===
Hyacinths are among the most popular bulbs selected for the process known as forcing, whereby plants are induced to flower earlier than their natural season (in this case, Christmas). It involves depriving bulbs of light and warmth for a period of several weeks, before growing them on in a bright, cool place such as a kitchen windowsill. It is possible to grow the bulbs in a narrow-necked vase of water, thus being able to view the root growth. Alternatively, bulbs can be purchased pre-forced.

== Toxicity ==
All parts of this plant are reportedly toxic to humans and animals if ingested.

== See also ==
- List of poisonous plants
