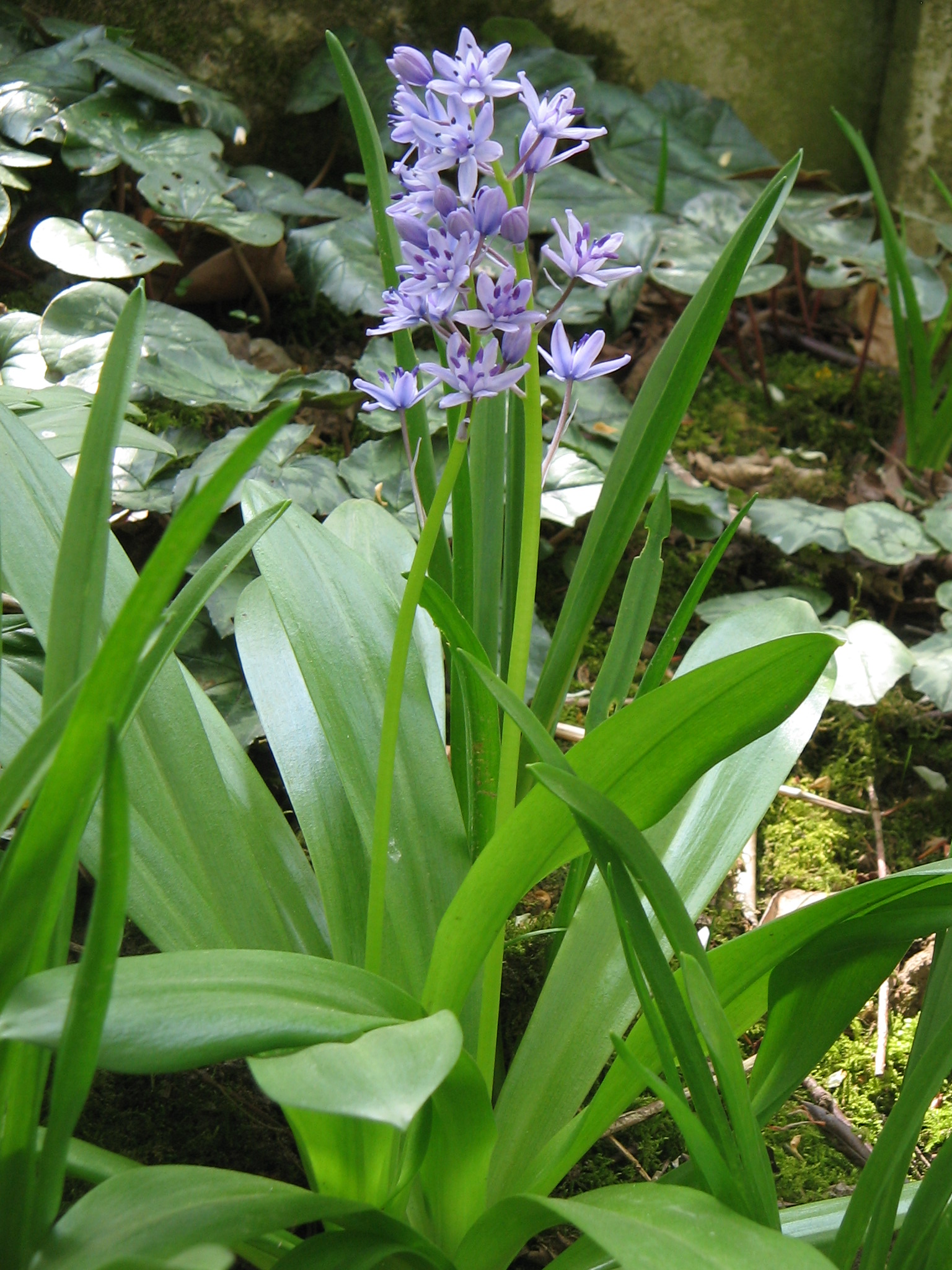

Scientific classification
- Kingdom: Plantae
- Clade: Tracheophytes
- Clade: Angiosperms
- Clade: Monocots
- Order: Asparagales
- Family: Asparagaceae
- Subfamily: Scilloideae
- Genus: Scilla
- Species: S. lilio-hyacinthus

Binomial name
- Scilla lilio-hyacinthus L.

Synonyms
- Oncostema lilio-hyacinthus (L.) Speta; Ornithogalum squamosum Lam.; Scilla squamosa Dulac; Stellaris squamosa (Dulac) Bubani; Tractema liliohyacinthus (L.) Speta

= Scilla lilio-hyacinthus =

Species of flowering plant

Scilla lilio-hyacinthus, the Pyrenean squill, is a species of flowering plant in the genus Scilla.

== Description ==
Scilla lilio-hyacinthus is a perennial, herbaceous plant that grows to heights of 10–30 centimeters, often in clumps. It is a geophyte that forms large scaly bulbs, from which new growth appears in spring. The six to ten basal simple, linear leaves are 15–30 centimeters long and 1–3 cm. wide, glossy green and lanceolate (pointed). There are two to three flower stems, which lengthen during flowering. About 5–15 upright Flowers form a dense, cone-shaped, racemose inflorescence.

The hermaphrodite flowers exhibit radial symmetry and are trimerous (having three parts). The six identically star shaped perianth tepals are 9-12 mm long, obovate and bright blue, or lilac to purple, rarely white in colour, and surrounded by small, narrow membranous bracts. The lower bracts are 1-2.5 cm long, ovate and membranous. There are six filamented stamens, similar in colour to the tepals, with dark blue anthers.

The fruit is a capsule.

== Taxonomy ==
First formally described by Carl Linnaeus in 1753, as one of eight Scilla species.

=== Etymology ===
The specific epithet evokes the resemblance of the bulb to that of lilies and of the leaves to hyacinths. Hence lilio-hyacinthus.

== Distribution and habitat ==
The natural range of Scilla lilio-hyacinthus includes northern Spain (Cantabrian Mountains, Pyrenees) and southern and central France (Masif central). There it is found in beech forests and meadows at altitudes between 600 and 1600 meters, usually in damp terrain such as the edges of streams, particularly calcareous soils.

== Ecology ==
The flowering period is from April to June. Pollination is entomogamous (by insects). Seed dispersal is barochore (by falling).

== Conservation ==
The plant is a protected species in the Masif central.

== Cultivation ==
Occasionally used as an ornamental garden plant. It is tolerant to temperatures down to -20 °C.

== Toxicity ==
All parts are poisonous.

== Bibliography ==
- Linnaeus, Carl (1753). "Scilla". Species Plantarum: exhibentes plantas rite cognitas, ad genera relatas, cum differentiis specificis, nominibus trivialibus, synonymis selectis, locis natalibus, secundum systema sexuale digestas. Vol. 1. Stockholm: Impensis Laurentii Salvii. pp. 308–309., see also Species Plantarum
- Tutin, T. G.; Heywood, V H; Burges, N. A.; Moore, D. M.; Valentine, D. H.; Walters, S. M.; Webb, D. A., eds. (1980). "Scilla lillio-hyacinthus". Flora Europaea. Volume 5, Alismataceae to Orchidaceae (monocotyledones). Cambridge, England: Cambridge University Press. p. 42. ISBN 0-521-20108-X. (see also Flora Europaea)
- POWO (2022). "Scilla lilio-hyacinthus L." Plants of the World Online. Royal Botanic Gardens, Kew.
