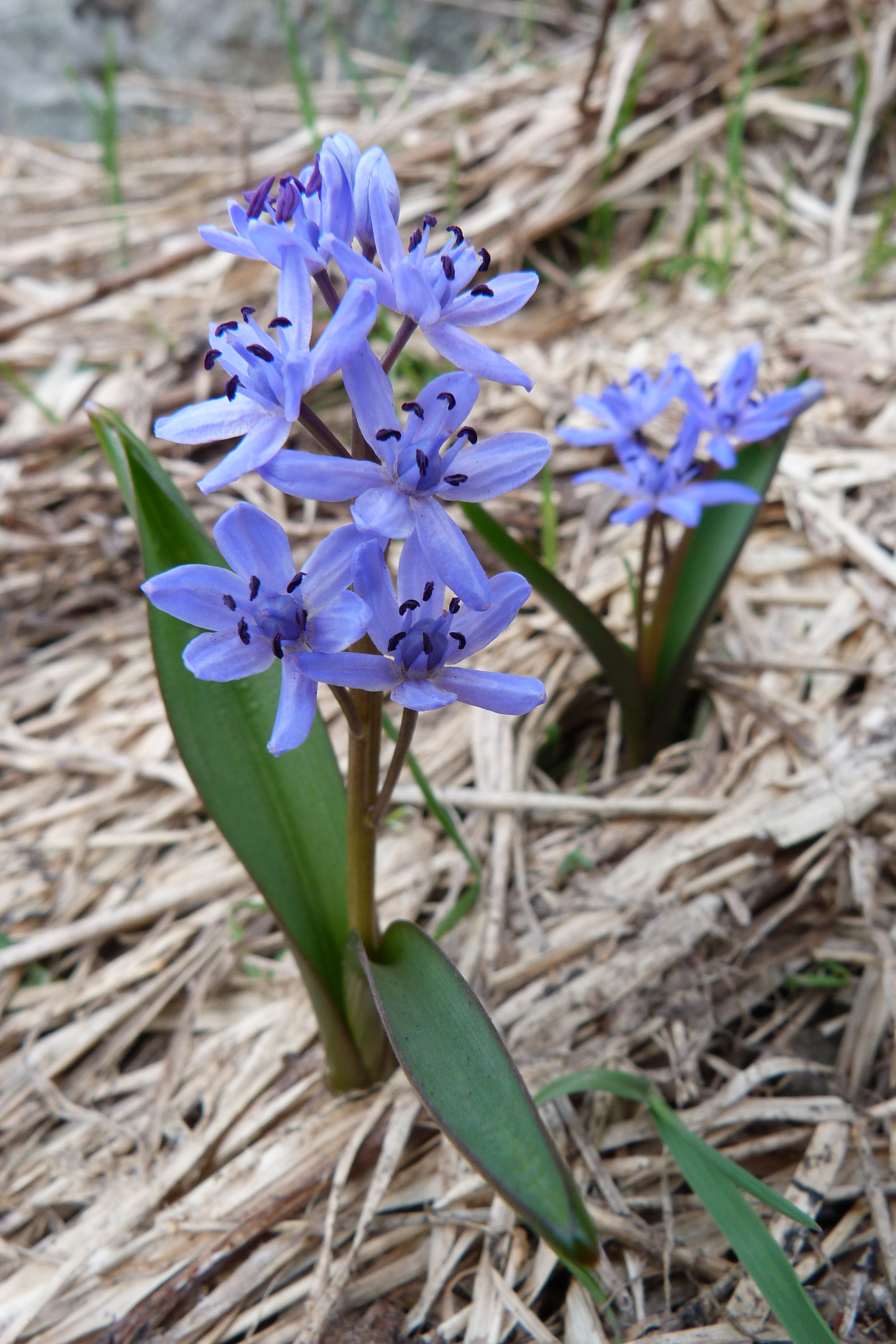
- Scilla bifolia

Scientific classification
- Kingdom: Plantae
- Clade: Tracheophytes
- Clade: Angiosperms
- Clade: Monocots
- Order: Asparagales
- Family: Asparagaceae
- Subfamily: Scilloideae
- Genus: Scilla; L.

Type species
- Scilla bifolia L.

Sections
- Scilla; Chionodoxa Boiss.

Synonyms
- Stellaris Fabr.; Stellaster Heist. ex Fabr; Lilio-Hyacinthus Ortega; Epimenidion Raf.; Ioncomelos Raf.; Lagocodes Raf.; Oncostema Raf.; Tractema Raf.; Genlisa Raf.; Chionodoxa Boiss.; Nectaroscilla Parl.; Adenoscilla Gren. & Godr.; Basaltogeton Salisb.; Hylomenes Salisb.; Monocallis Salisb.; Othocallis Salisb.; Petranthe Salisb.; Rinopodium Salisb.; Caloscilla Jord. & Fourr.; ×Chionoscilla J.Allen ex Nicholson; Apsanthea Jord. in C.T.A.Jordan & J.P.Fourreau; Autonoe (Webb & Berthel.) Speta; Chouardia Speta; Pfosseria Speta; Schnarfia Speta

= Scilla =

Genus of flowering plants

- Floral formula
- P3+3 A3+3 G(3)

Scilla (/ˈsɪlə/) is a genus of about 30 to 80 species of bulb-forming perennial herbaceous plants in the family Asparagaceae, subfamily Scilloideae. Sometimes called the squills in English, they are native to woodlands, subalpine meadows, and seashores throughout Europe, Africa and the Middle East. A few species are also naturalized in Australasia and North America. Their flowers are usually blue, but white, pink, and purple types are known; most flower in early spring, but a few are autumn-flowering. Several Scilla species are valued as ornamental garden plants.

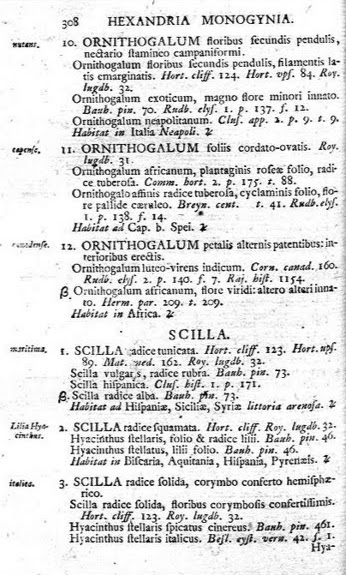
Linnaeus: Scilla 1753, 1st page

== Taxonomy ==
Species of Scilla have been known since classical antiquity, being described by both Greek (Theophrastus [371–287 BC] and Discorides [40–90 AD]) and Roman (Pliny [23–79 AD] (Note: e.g. scilla autem et bulbi et cepae et alium non nisi in rectum radicantur (squill and the bulbs and onion and garlic only throw out straight roots))) writers. Theophrastus described Scilla hyacinthoides (skilla), and more briefly S. autumnalis and S. bifolia in his Historia plantarum, where he mentions "those of squill" (σκῐ́λλης; skilles). In classical literature, Scilla was known for its medicinal properties. (Note: One of the common names for Scilla maritima has been scilla officinalis, indicating its medicinal use) Later mentions include pre-Linnaen botanists such as Fuchs (1542) and Clusius (1601), who considered many closely related plants to be types of Hyacinthus.

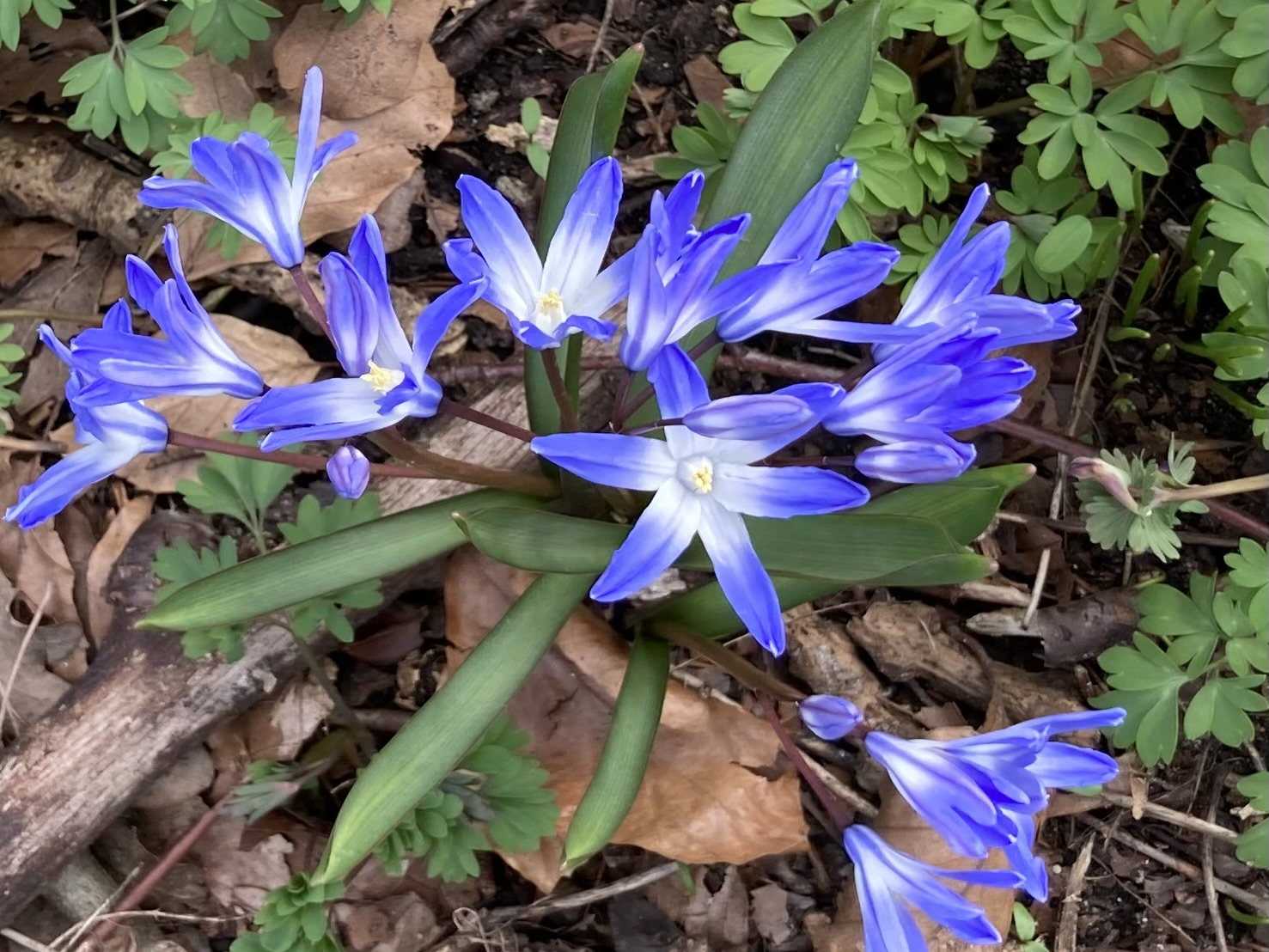
Spring Scilla flowers in Kildeskoven, Greater Copenhagen, Denmark

The genus Scilla has a long and complicated history in terms of its classification, circumscription and subdivision, and is not fully resolved. The genus Scilla was first formally described by Linnaeus in 1753, and hence bears his name as the botanical authority, Scilla L.. In Scilla, he included six plants previously considered as Hyacinthus. For instance, he renamed Clusius' Hyacinthus stellatus cinerei coloris (Note: sic. Clusius actually used cineracei) as Scilla italica (Hyacinthoides italica in modern systems) and Hyacinthus stellatus peruanus as Scilla peruviana, while Fuchs' Hyacinthus caeruleus mas minor, he named Scilla bifolia.

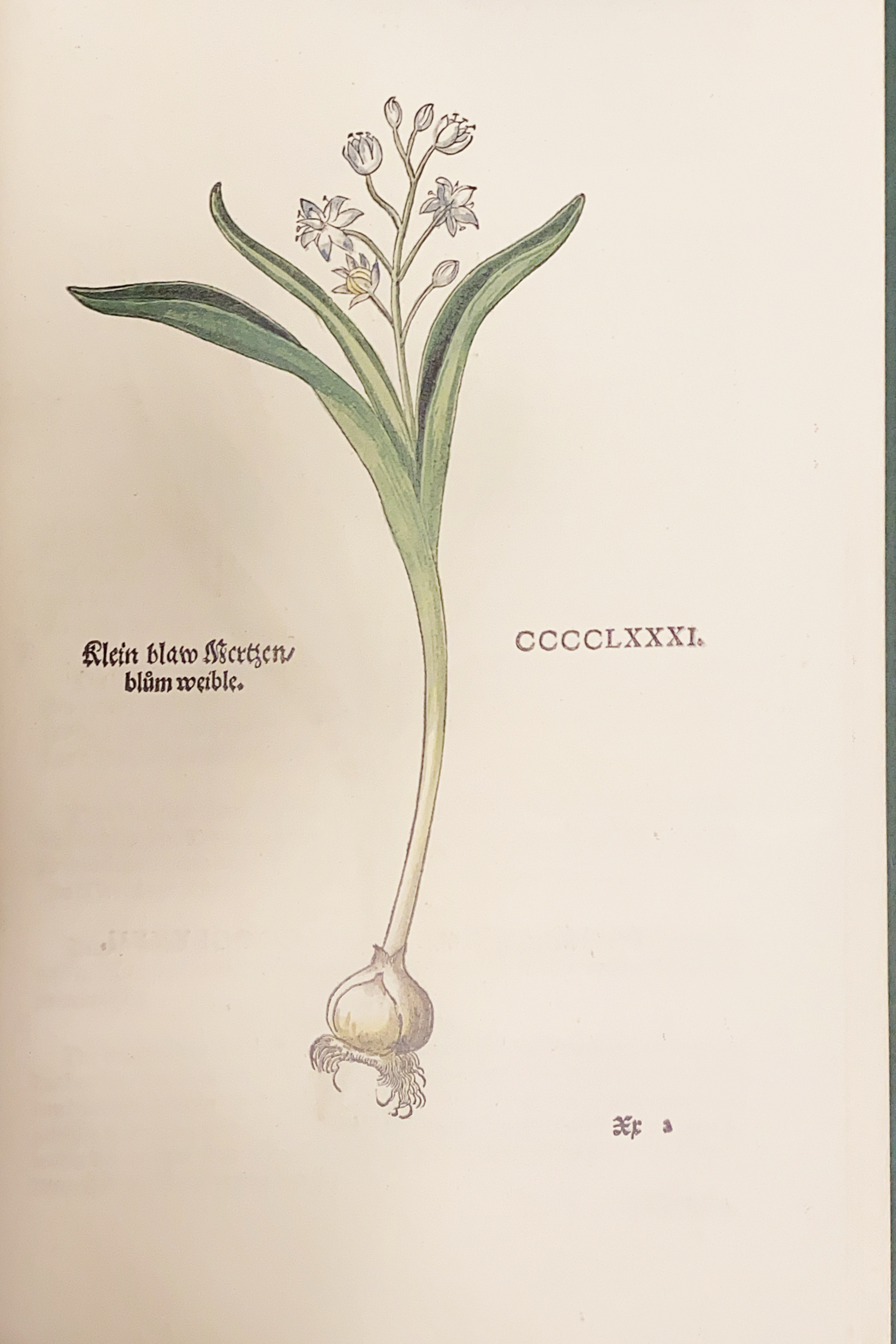
Hyacinthus caeruleus mas minor (Scilla bifolia) Fuchs De historia 1543

In total, Linnaeus listed eight species of Scilla, (Note: Scilla maritima, S. lilio-hyacinthus, S. italica, S. peruviana, S. amoena, S. bifolia, S. autumnalis, S. unifolia) from the Mediterranean, Europe and southwest Asia, and placed the genus in the grouping Hexandria Monogynia (6 stamens, 1 pistil) within his system of sexual classification (systema sexuale). Since he listed S. maritima (which had previously been known as scilla officinale) first, this was considered the type species. On the basis that the seed morphology distinguished this species from all the other Linnean Scilla, Steinheil reclassified it as a member of a novel genus, Urginea, now submerged in Drimia as Drimia maritima.

Later, De Jussieu (1789), using a natural system, the relative value of plant characteristics, rather than purely sexual ones, and a hierarchical system of ranks, grouped Scilla into a "family" which he called Asphodeli, along with Hyacinthus and Allium. Jaume-Saint-Hilaire (1805), while maintaining the same affiliation, recognized three species S. maritima, S. amoena and S. italica. By 1853, Lindley had created a very large order, the Liliaceae, in which Scilla and related genera formed one of eleven suborders, as Scilleae. This included many genera, including Camassia and Ornithogalum. Treatments of Scilla in the nineteenth century include those of Dumortier (1827), Salisbury (1796, 1866) and Baker (1873), with rather different approaches.

Historically, Scilla and related genera were placed with lily-like plants in the order Liliales, for instance as the tribe Hyacintheae of the family Liliaceae. The availability of molecular phylogenetic methods in taxonomic classification led to major realignments of several related monocot orders, particularly with the adoption of the Angiosperm Phylogeny Group system. Significantly, hyacinth-like plants including Scilla were initially placed in a separate family, the Hyacinthaceae in the order Asparagales, specifically in the very large subfamily Hyacinthoideae. Since 2009, the Hyacintheae, including Scilla, have been considered as Scilloideae, a subfamily of the family Asparagaceae. There they are placed as one of about 21 genera in the subtribe Hyacinthinae within tribe Hyacintheae. The most closely related genera to Scilla were Muscari Mill. and Chionodoxa Boiss.

=== Subdivision ===
For some time, Chionodoxa had been considered a possible synonym to Scilla bifolia L. and molecular methods failed to support the existence of a separate genus, but rather its specimens appeared intermixed with those of Scilla. Although there are distinguishing morphological features (e.g. fused tepal bases and broadened filaments), these were considered paraphyletic, having arisen in several lines within the Hyacinthaceae. Furthermore, it was observed that Chionodoxa was capable of hybridization with Scilla bifolia. It was therefore proposed that Chionodoxa be considered an obsolete genus and be submerged within Scilla.

Subsequently, it was proposed that the species of Scilla be split into two sections, Chionodoxa that would include those taxa previously considered to belong in the genus Chionodoxa, and Scilla which would contain the remainder.

=== Species ===
The precise number of Scilla species in the genus depends on which proposals to split the genus are accepted. In addition to creating two sections, some authorities have split the genus into a number of smaller genera. For instance, particularly the Eurasian species have been moved to genera such as Othocallis Salisb., so that Scilla siberica would become Othocallis siberica, leaving a much smaller genus referred to as Scilla s.s. or Scilla sensu Speta, with about 30 species. However, this has not been generally accepted, leaving a much larger Scilla s.l. of about 80 species. Although the Flora of North America mentions (but does not list) 50 species, World Flora Online lists 83 species, as of May 2022. Speta's scheme (1998) created 8 separate genera, but many of these are very narrowly defined being either monotypic (single species) or oligotypic (very few species).

Most recently Hall et al. (2026) found that Scilla sensu lato is polyphyletic, with its species distributed across all three major clades of Hyacinthinae. Their nuclear and plastid phylogenies broadly supported the recognition of the genera segregated by Speta, although not all of these segregate genera were recovered as monophyletic. In particular, the study found evidence of non-monophyly and conflicting phylogenetic placement in Othocallis and Fessia, indicating that generic boundaries within the group remain unresolved.

=== Etymology ===
Both the scientific genus name Scilla and the common word squill derive, via Middle English and French, from the Latin scilla and Greek σκίλλα skilla words for the plants. The common name squill has been applied to a number of other similar taxa such as Drimia.

== Distribution and habitat ==
Native to woodlands, subalpine meadows, and seashores throughout Europe (especially the Mediterranean), Africa (especially South Africa), Eurasia (especially southwest Asia) and the Middle East. A few species are also widely naturalized, particularly in Australia, New Zealand and North America.

== Cultivation and uses ==
Many Scilla species, notably S. siberica and members of section Chionodoxa, are grown in gardens for their attractive early spring flowers.

== Bibliography ==
=== Books ===
- Brenzel, Kathleen Norris, ed. (2007). "Scilla". Sunset western garden book (8th, completely rev. and updated ed.). Menlo Park, CA: Sunset Pub. Corp. p. 619. ISBN 978-0-376-03917-0.
- Speta, Franz (1998a). "Hyacintheae". In Kubitzki, Klaus; Huber, Herbert (eds.). Flowering plants. Monocotyledons: Lilianae (except Orchidaceae). The families and genera of vascular plants. Vol. 3. Berlin: Springer-Verlag. pp. 261–285. ISBN 3-540-64060-6.
- Christenhusz, Maarten J. M.; Fay, Michael F.; Chase, Mark W. (2017). "Scilloideae". Plants of the World: An Illustrated Encyclopedia of Vascular Plants. University of Chicago Press. p. 174. ISBN 978-0-226-52292-0.
- Lewis, Charlton T.; Short, Charles (1891). "scilla". A New Latin Dictionary. New York: Harper and Brothers. p. 1642.(see A Latin Dictionary and Perseus Project)
- Pearsall, Judy; Trumble, Bill (1996). "squill". The Oxford English Reference Dictionary (2nd ed.). Oxford University Press. p. 1405. ISBN 978-0-19-860050-3.
- Tutin, T. G.; Heywood, V H; Burges, N. A.; Moore, D. M.; Valentine, D. H.; Walters, S. M.; Webb, D. A., eds. (1980). "Scilla". Flora Europaea. Volume 5, Alismataceae to Orchidaceae (monocotyledones). Cambridge, England: Cambridge University Press. pp. 41–43. ISBN 0-521-20108-X. (see also Flora Europaea)

==== Historical sources (chronological) ====
- Theophrastus (1916) [4th c. BC]. "I vi 7". Theophrastus: Enquiry into Plants. Loeb Classical Library. Translated by Hort, Arthur. London and New York: William Heinemann and G.P. Putnam's Sons.
- Plinius Secundus, Gaius (1938) [77 AD]. Naturalis Historia 37 vols. Loeb Classical Library. Translated by Harris Rackham; W.H.S. Jones; David Edward Eichholz. Harvard University Press.
- Fuchs, Leonhart (1542). "De Scilla". De historia stirpium commentarii insignes: maximis impensis et uigiliis elaborati, adiectis earundem uiuis plusquam quingentis imaginibus, nunquam antea ad naturae imitationem artificiosius effictis & expressis / c Leonharto Fuchsio medico hac nostra aetate longè clarissimo, autore. Regiones peregrinas pleriq[ue], alij alias, sumptu ingenti, studio indefesso, nec sine discrimine uirae nonnunquam, adierunt, ut simplicium materiae cognoscendae facultatem compararent sibi: eam tibi materiam uniuersam summo & impensarum & temporis compendio, procul discrimine omni, tanquam in uiuo iucundissimoq́[ue] uiridario, magna cum uoluptate, hinc cognoscere licebit. Accessit ijs succincta admodum uocum difficilium & obscurarum passim in hoc opere occurrentium explicatio. Vnà cum quadruplici indice, quorum primus quidem stirpium nomenclaturas Graecas, alter Latinas, tertius officinis seplasiariorum & herbarijs usitatas, quartus Germanicas continebit. Albrecht Meyer (llustrator), Heinrich Füllmaurer (woodblocks), Vitus Rudolph Speckle (printer). Basileae: In officina Isingriniana. pp. 781–783.
- Clusius, Carolus (1601). "Scilla". Rariorum plantarum historia: quae accesserint, proxima pagina docebit. Antwerp: Ioannem Moretum. pp. 170–174. (also at Botanicus: Rariorum plantarum )
- Linnaeus, Carl (1753). "Scilla". Species Plantarum: exhibentes plantas rite cognitas, ad genera relatas, cum differentiis specificis, nominibus trivialibus, synonymis selectis, locis natalibus, secundum systema sexuale digestas. Vol. 1. Stockholm: Impensis Laurentii Salvii. pp. 308–309., see also Species Plantarum
- Jussieu, Antoine Laurent de (1789). "Scilla". Genera Plantarum, secundum ordines naturales disposita juxta methodum in Horto Regio Parisiensi exaratam. Paris: apud viduam Herissant et Theophilum Barrois. p. 53. OCLC 5161409.
- Salisbury, R. A. (1796). Prodromus stirpium in horto ad Chapel Allerton vigentium (in Latin). London: self.
- Jaume-Saint-Hilaire, Jean Henri (1805). "Scilla". Exposition de familles naturales. Vol. 1. Paris: Treutel et Würtz. p. 131.
- Dumortier, Barthélemy Charles Joseph (1827). "Scilla". Florula Belgica, operis majoris prodromus (in Latin). Tornaci nerviorum: J. Casterman. p. 140.
- Lindley, John (1853) [1846]. "Scilleae". The Vegetable Kingdom: or, The structure, classification, and uses of plants, illustrated upon the natural system (3rd. ed.). London: Bradbury & Evans. p. 205.
- Salisbury, Richard Anthony; Gray, J. E. (1866). The Genera of Plants (Unpublished fragment). J. Van Voorst.

=== Articles ===
- Angiosperm Phylogeny Group (1998). "An ordinal classification for the families of flowering plants". Annals of the Missouri Botanical Garden. 85 (4): 531–553. Bibcode:1998AnMBG..85..531.. doi:10.2307/2992015. JSTOR 2992015.
- Angiosperm Phylogeny Group IV (2016). "An update of the Angiosperm Phylogeny Group classification for the orders and families of flowering plants: APG IV". Botanical Journal of the Linnean Society. 181 (1): 1–20. doi:10.1111/boj.12385. S2CID 7498637.
- Baker, J G (1873). "Revision of the genera and species of Scilleae and Chlorogaleae". The Journal of the Linnean Society, Botany. 13 (68): 209–292. doi:10.1111/j.1095-8339.1872.tb00093.x.
- Chase, M.W.; Reveal, J.L. & Fay, M.F. (2009), "A subfamilial classification for the expanded asparagalean families Amaryllidaceae, Asparagaceae and Xanthorrhoeaceae", Botanical Journal of the Linnean Society, 161 (2): 132–136, doi:10.1111/j.1095-8339.2009.00999.x
- Chouard, M. Pierre (January 1934). "Les noms linnéens des Scilla et des Endymio et leur véritable signification". Bulletin de la Société Botanique de France (in French). 81 (4): 620–630. Bibcode:1934BSBF...81..620C. doi:10.1080/00378941.1934.10834006.
- Firat, Mehmet; Yildirim, Hasan (February 2020). "Scilla hakkariensis, sp. nov. (Asparagaceae: Scilloideae): a new species of Scilla L. from Hakkari (eastern Anatolia)". Adansonia. 42 (2): 89–94. Bibcode:2020Adan...42...89F. doi:10.5252/adansonia2020v42a2. S2CID 211554226.
- Greilhuber, Johann; Speta, Franz (1976). "C-banded karyotypes in the Scilla hohenackeri group, S. persica, and Puschkinia (Liliaceae)". Plant Systematics and Evolution. 126 (2): 149–188. Bibcode:1976PSyEv.126..149G. doi:10.1007/BF00981669. JSTOR 23642152. S2CID 28559954.
- Martínez-Azorín, Mario; Crespo, Manuel B.; Dold, Anthony P.; Pinter, Michael; Wetschnig, Wolfgang (27 February 2015). "New combinations and lectotype designations in Asparagaceae subfam. Scilloideae". Phytotaxa. 201 (2): 165. Bibcode:2015Phytx.201..165M. doi:10.11646/phytotaxa.201.2.7.
- Martínez-Azorín, Mario; Crespo, ManuelB. (1 December 2016). "(48) Request for a binding decision on whether Scilla L. (Hyacinthaceae subfam. Hyacinthoideae) and Squilla Steinh. (Hyacinthaceae subfam. Urgineoideae) are sufficiently alike to be confused". Taxon. 65 (6): 1437–1438. Bibcode:2016Taxon..65.1437M. doi:10.12705/656.27. hdl:10045/78247.
- Negbi, Moshe (May 1989). "Theophrastus on geophytes". Botanical Journal of the Linnean Society. 100 (1): 15–43. doi:10.1111/j.1095-8339.1989.tb01708.x.
- Pfosser, Martin; Speta, Franz (1999). "Phylogenetics of Hyacinthaceae Based on Plastid DNA Sequences". Annals of the Missouri Botanical Garden. 86 (4): 852. Bibcode:1999AnMBG..86..852P. doi:10.2307/2666172. JSTOR 2666172.
- Speta, F (14 August 1998b). "Systematische Analyse der Gattung Scilla L. s.l. (Hyacinthaceae)" [Systematic analysis of the genus Scilla L. s.l. (Hyacinthaceae)]. Phyton. 38 (1): 1–141.
- Steinheil, Adolph (1834). "Matériaux pour servir a la flore de barbarie III: Note sur le genre Urginea nouvellement formé dans la famille Liliacées". Annales des Sciences Naturelles, Botanique (in French). Second series 1: 321–332.
- Trávníèček, Bohumil; Duchoslav, Martin; Šarhanová, Petra & Šafáøová, Lenka (2009), "Squills (Scilla s.lat., Hyacinthaceae) in the flora of the Czech Republic, with taxonomical notes on Central-European squill populations" (PDF), Acta Musei Moraviae, Scientiae Biologicae (Brno), 94: 157–205
- Witztum, A.; Negbi, M. (1991). "Primary Xylem of Scilla hyacinthoides (Liliaceae): The Wool-Bearing Bulb of Theophrastus". Economic Botany. 45 (1): 97–102. Bibcode:1991EcBot..45...97W. doi:10.1007/BF02860053. JSTOR 4255312. S2CID 35267741.
- Yildirim, H.; Yetisen, K.; Özdemir, A.; Özdemir, C. (2 March 2017). "An Anatomical Study of Scilla (Scilloideae) Section Chionodoxa and Scilla bifolia in Turkey1". Planta Daninha. 35. doi:10.1590/s0100-83582017350100004.
- Yildirim, Hasan; Altıoglu, Yusuf (2021). "Resurrection of Genus Chionodoxa Boiss. (Asparagaceae), a morphological revision of Chionodoxa taxa in Turkey and a new species of this genus". Bağbahçe Bilim Dergisi (in Turkish). 8 (1): 5195.

=== Websites ===
- POWO (2022). "Scilla L." Plants of the World Online. Royal Botanic Gardens, Kew.
- WCSP (2022). "Scilla L., Sp. Pl.: 308 (1753)". Royal Botanic Gardens, Kew.
  - WCSP (2022a). "Scilla". World Checklist of Selected Plant Families. Royal Botanic Gardens, Kew.
- WFO (2022). "Scilla L." World Flora Online.
- Stevens, P.F. (2022) [2001]. "4.Scilloideae; 4D. Hyacintheae; 4Dc. Hyacinthinae Parlatore". AP Web v. 14. Missouri Botanical Garden. (see also Angiosperm Phylogeny Website)
- McNeill, J (2002). "Scilla Linnaeus, Sp. Pl. 1: 308. 1753; Gen. Pl. ed. 5, 146. 1754". Flora of North America. New York: Oxford University Press. p. 58.
- "Elenco delle specie - Genere: Scilla - Famiglia: Asparaginaceae". Flora Italiana. 2022.
- Janssen, David (2022). "Scilla, squill, glory-of-the-snow". Flora Emslandia.
- PBS (2022). "Scilla". Pacific Bulb Society.
