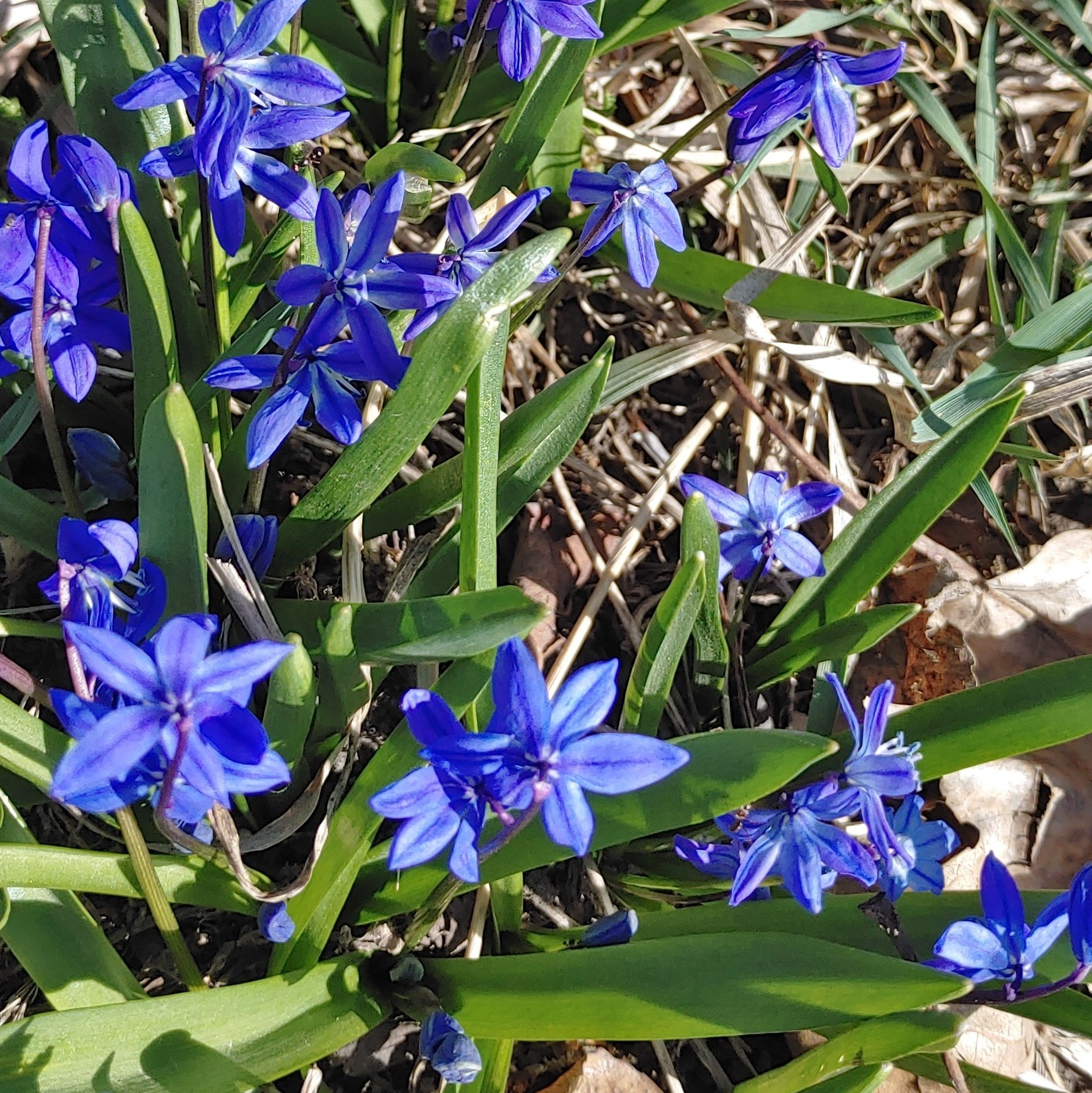

Scientific classification
- Kingdom: Plantae
- Clade: Tracheophytes
- Clade: Angiosperms
- Clade: Monocots
- Order: Asparagales
- Family: Asparagaceae
- Subfamily: Scilloideae
- Genus: Scilla
- Species: S. siberica

Binomial name
- Scilla siberica Andrews

= Scilla siberica =

Siberian squill

Species of flowering plant

Scilla siberica, the Siberian squill or wood squill, is a species of flowering plant in the family Asparagaceae, native to southwestern Russia, the Caucasus, and Turkey. Despite the botanical name, it is not native to Siberia.

== Description ==
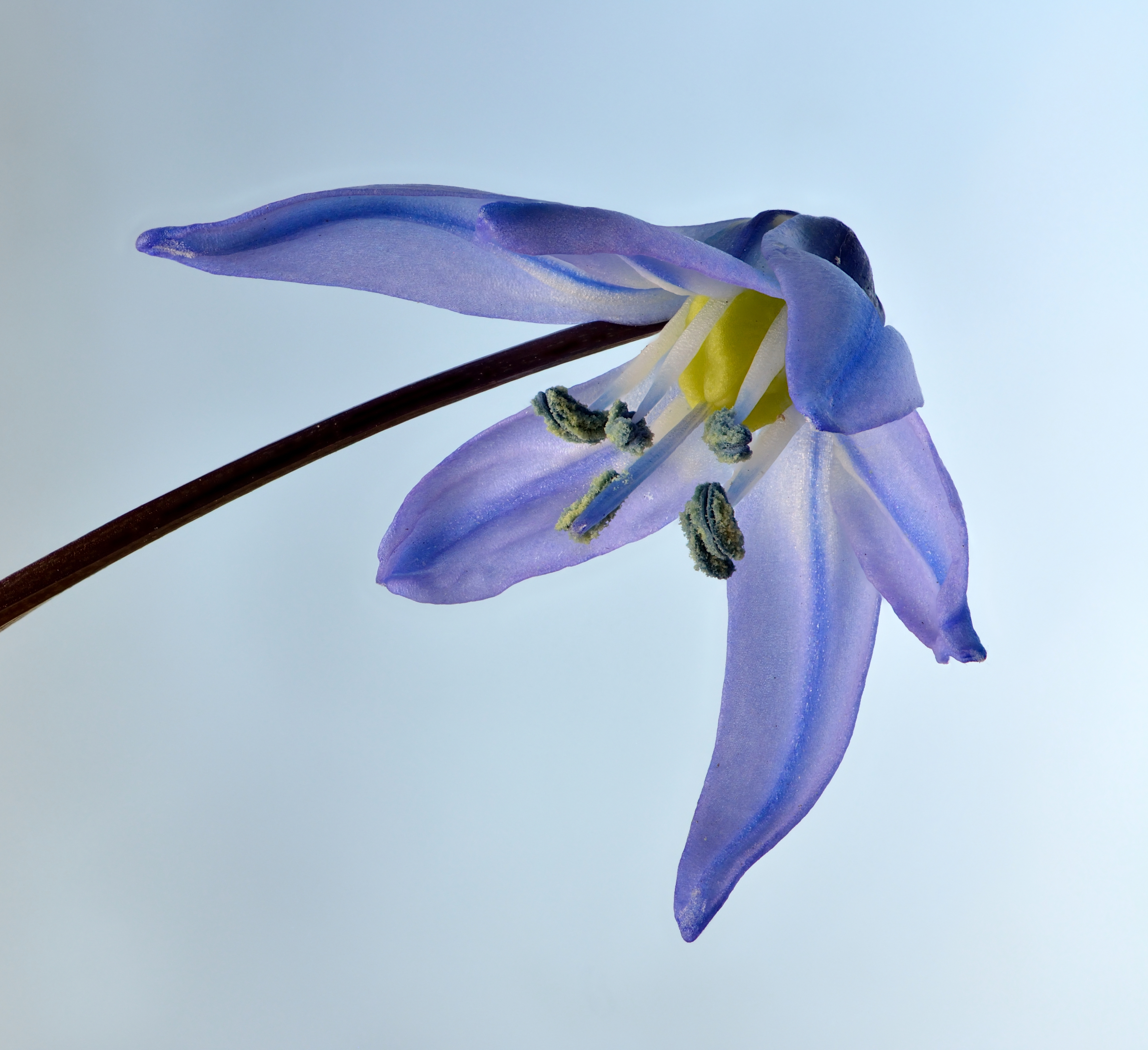
Flower

Growing to 10–20 cm (4–8 in) tall by 5 cm (2 in) wide, it is a bulbous perennial, with two to four strap-shaped leaves appearing in early spring, at the same time as the nodding, blue, bell-shaped flowers.

The flowers have six tepals and six stamens, and are arranged singly or in racemes of two or three. Petals may be reflexed to the horizontal when sunlight is bright, but are more often cup-shaped. The flowers are usually blue, but those of Scilla siberica var. alba are white. The stamens of Scilla are separate, unlike those of the related genus Puschkinia, which are fused into a tube. The pollen is dark blue.

After flowering, the flower stems become limp as capsules (pods) mature. At maturity, the capsules become purple and split open, releasing small, dark brown seeds. When the seeds are mature, the leaves wither and the plant goes dormant until the next spring.

The seedlings are hollow-leaved.

All parts of this plant are suspected of being poisonous.

== Cultivation ==
S. siberica is cultivated as it has bluebell-like flowers. It naturalizes rapidly from seed. At 15 cm (5.9 in), it is suitable for planting in grass, and will spread by seed to form large colonies that go dormant by the time grass needs to be mowed. This plant has gained the Royal Horticultural Society's Award of Garden Merit.

This is a known invasive species in the state of Minnesota.

== Gallery ==
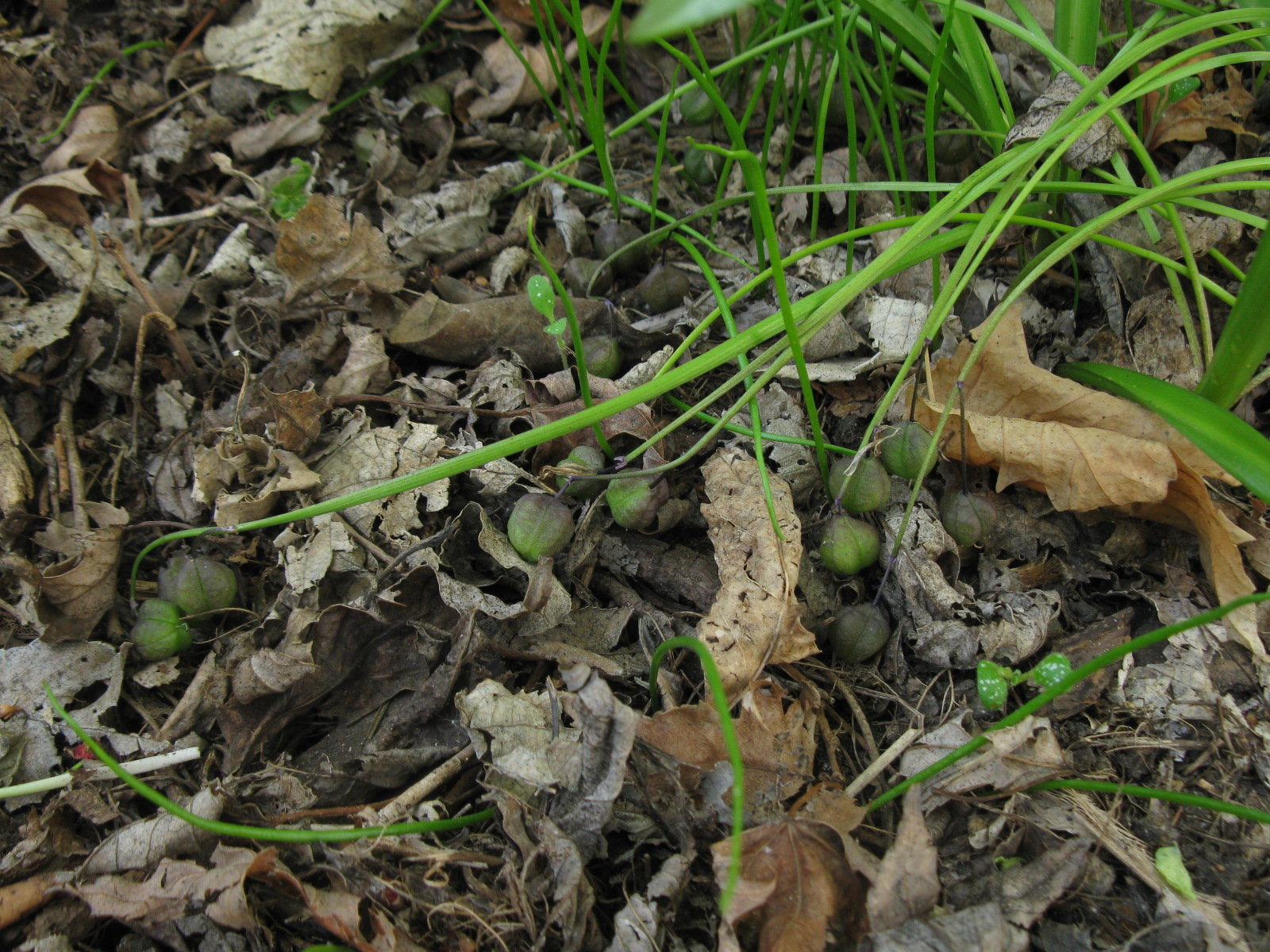
Seed capsules

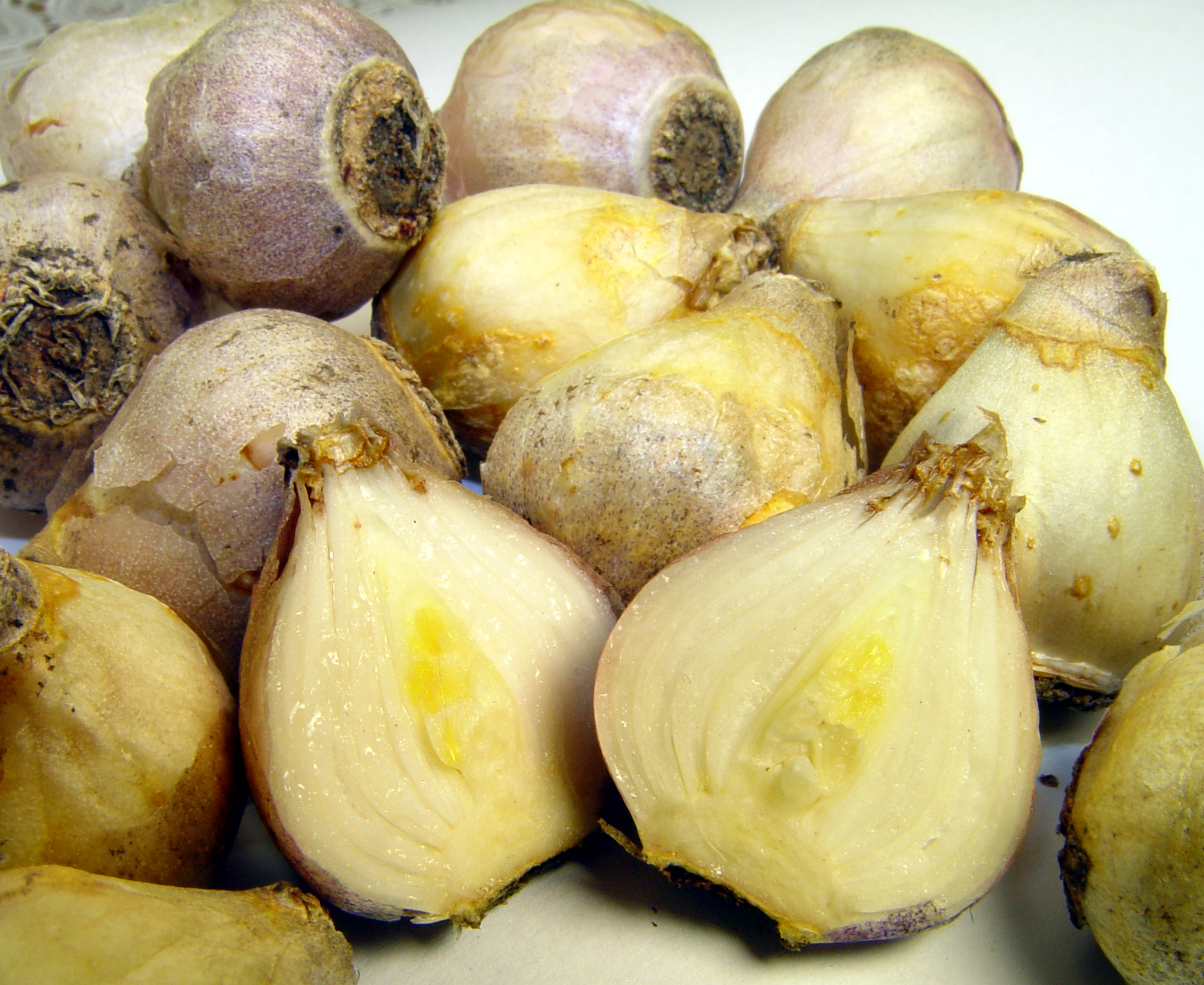
Cross section of bulb

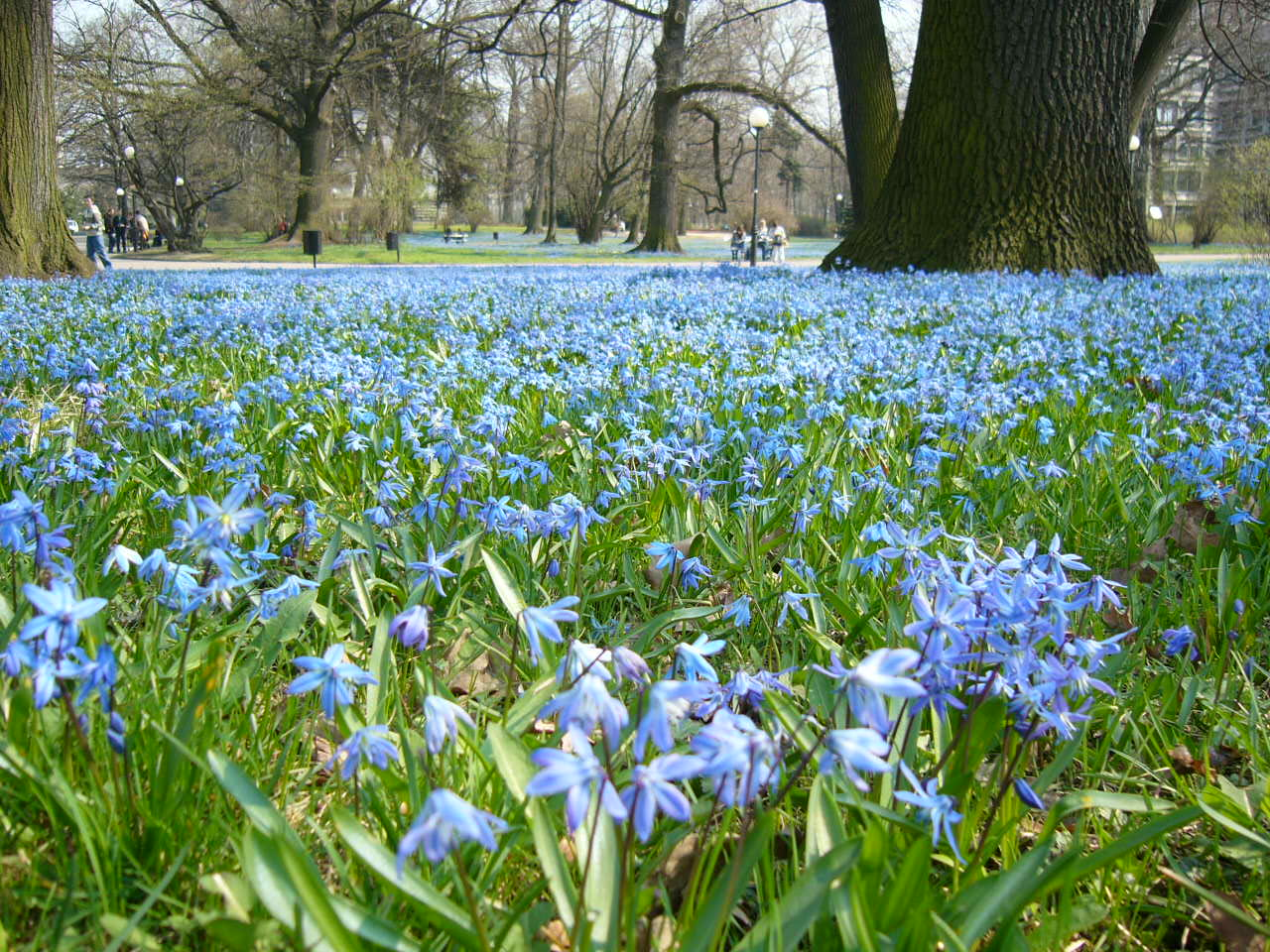
Klepacza Park in Łodz, Poland

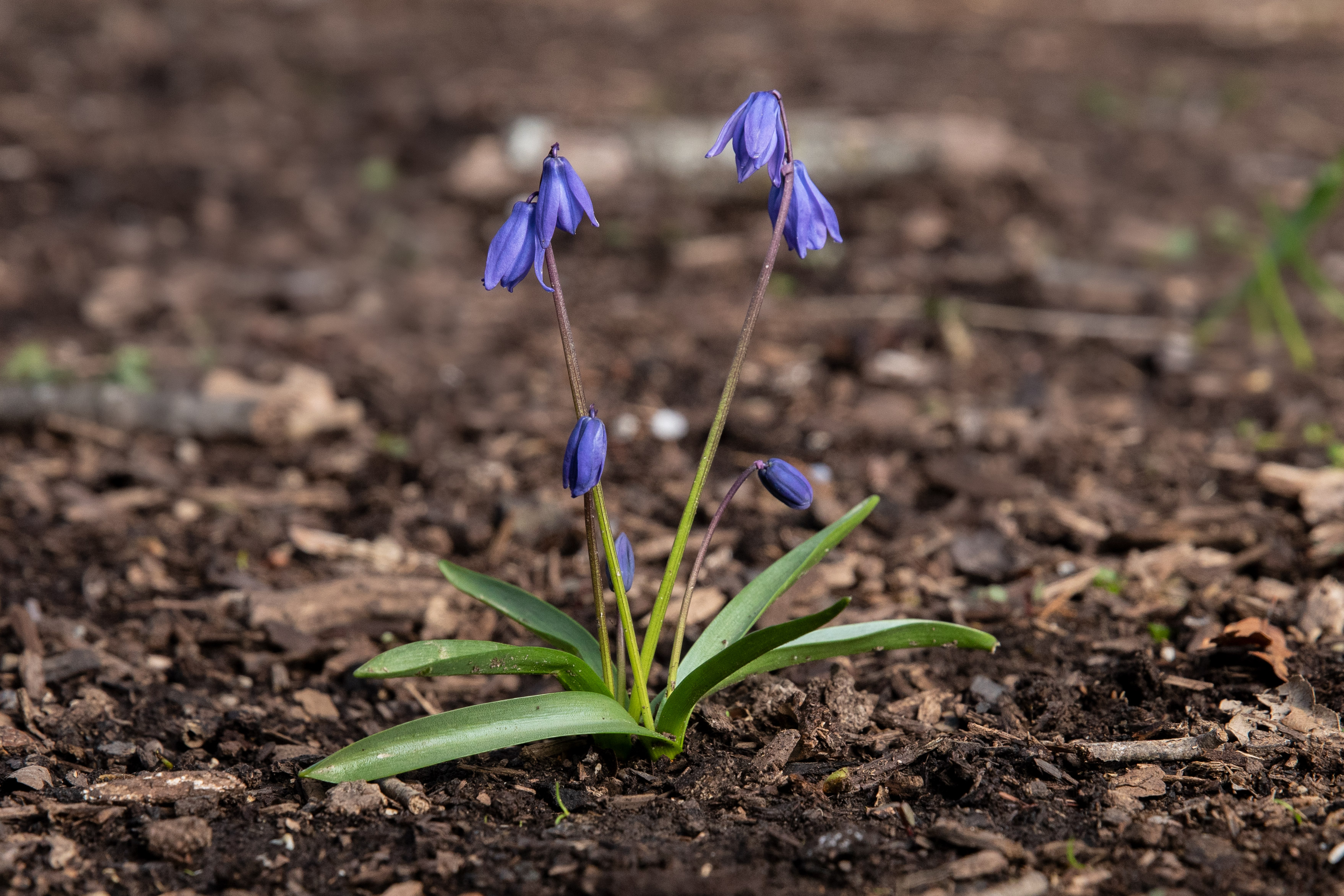
Pendulous flowers at various stages of development

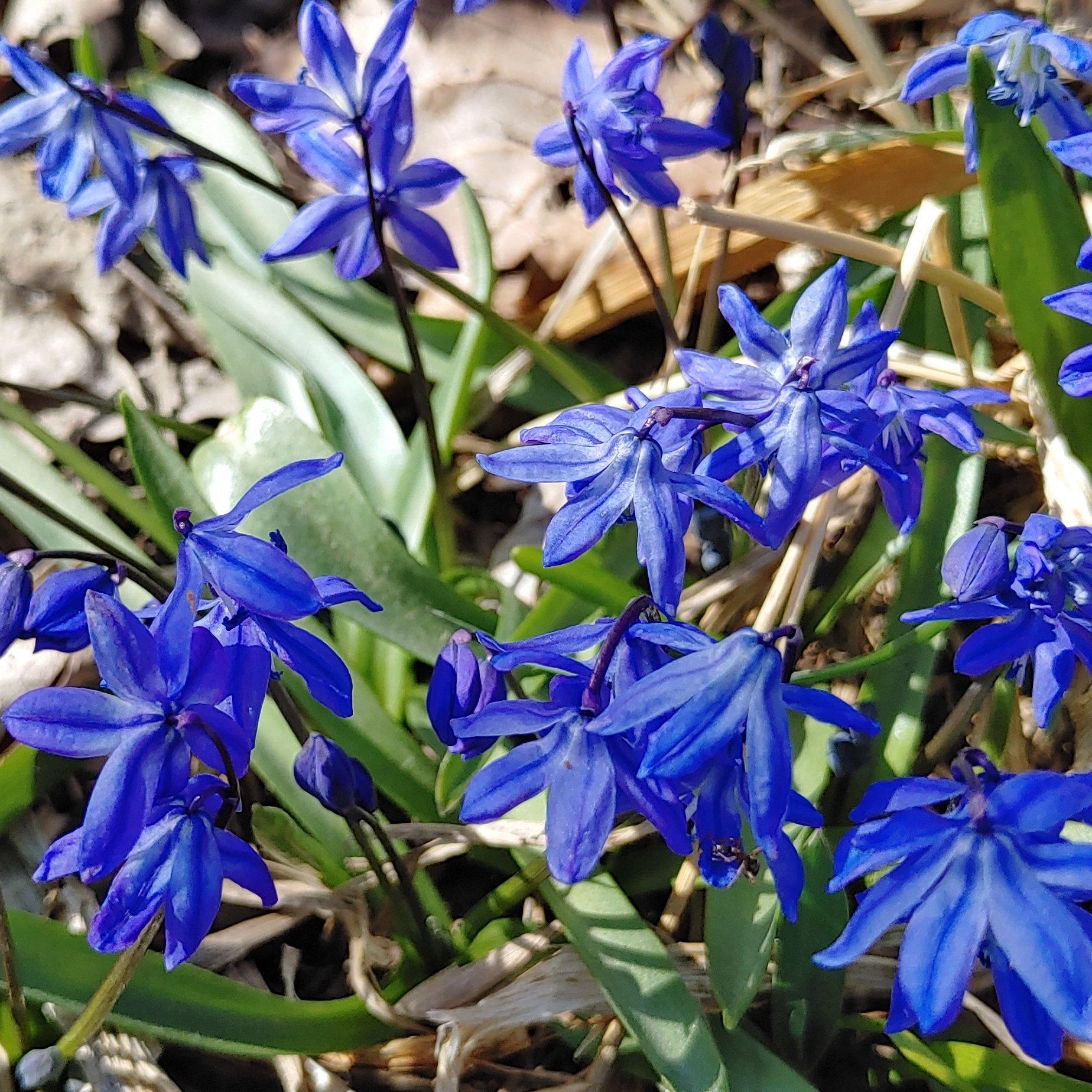
In Calgary, Alberta in April

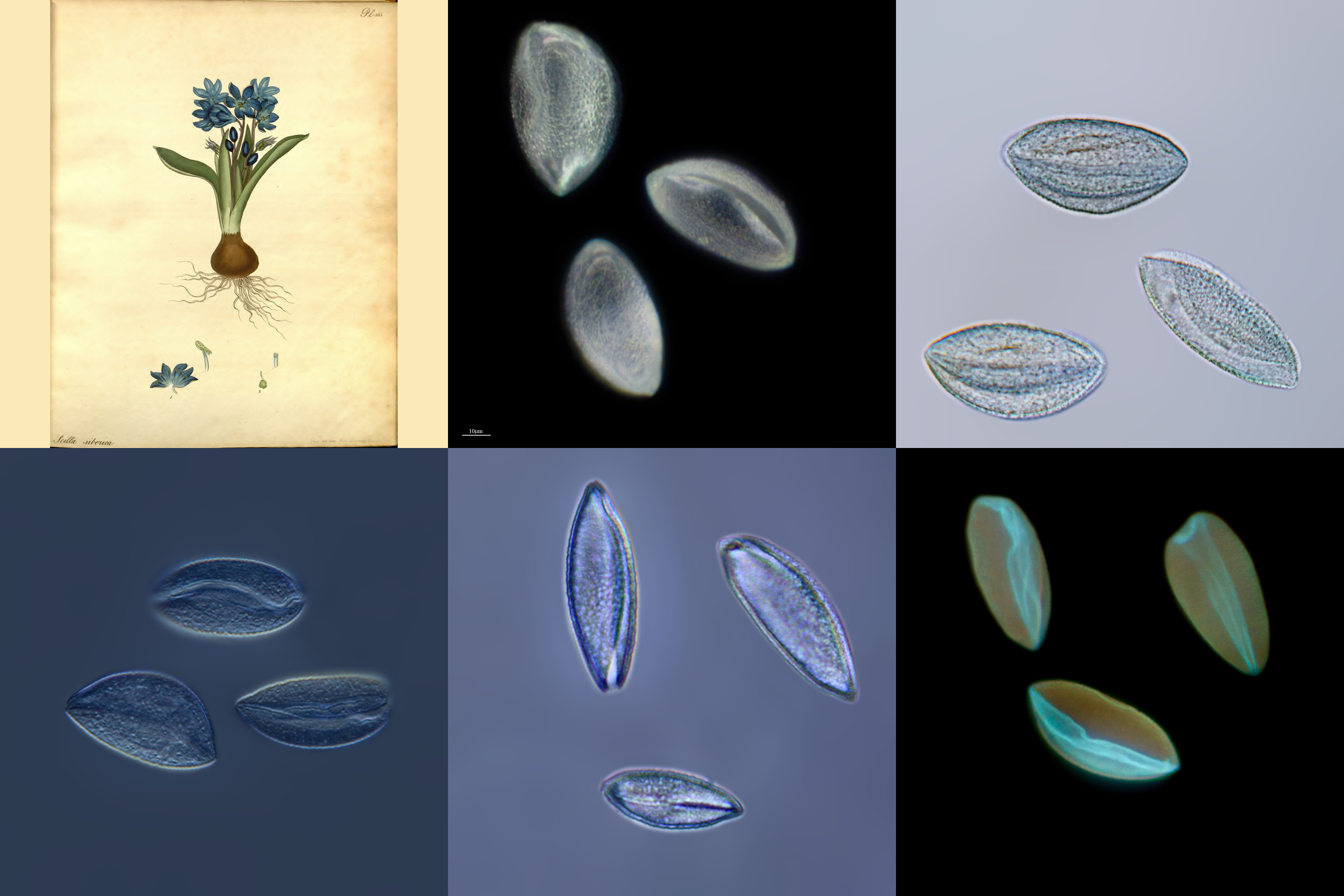
Pollen grains under a microscope with different illumination methods (EPI illumination, bright field, differential interference contrast, phase contrast, autofluorescence)

== See also ==
- List of Scilla species
