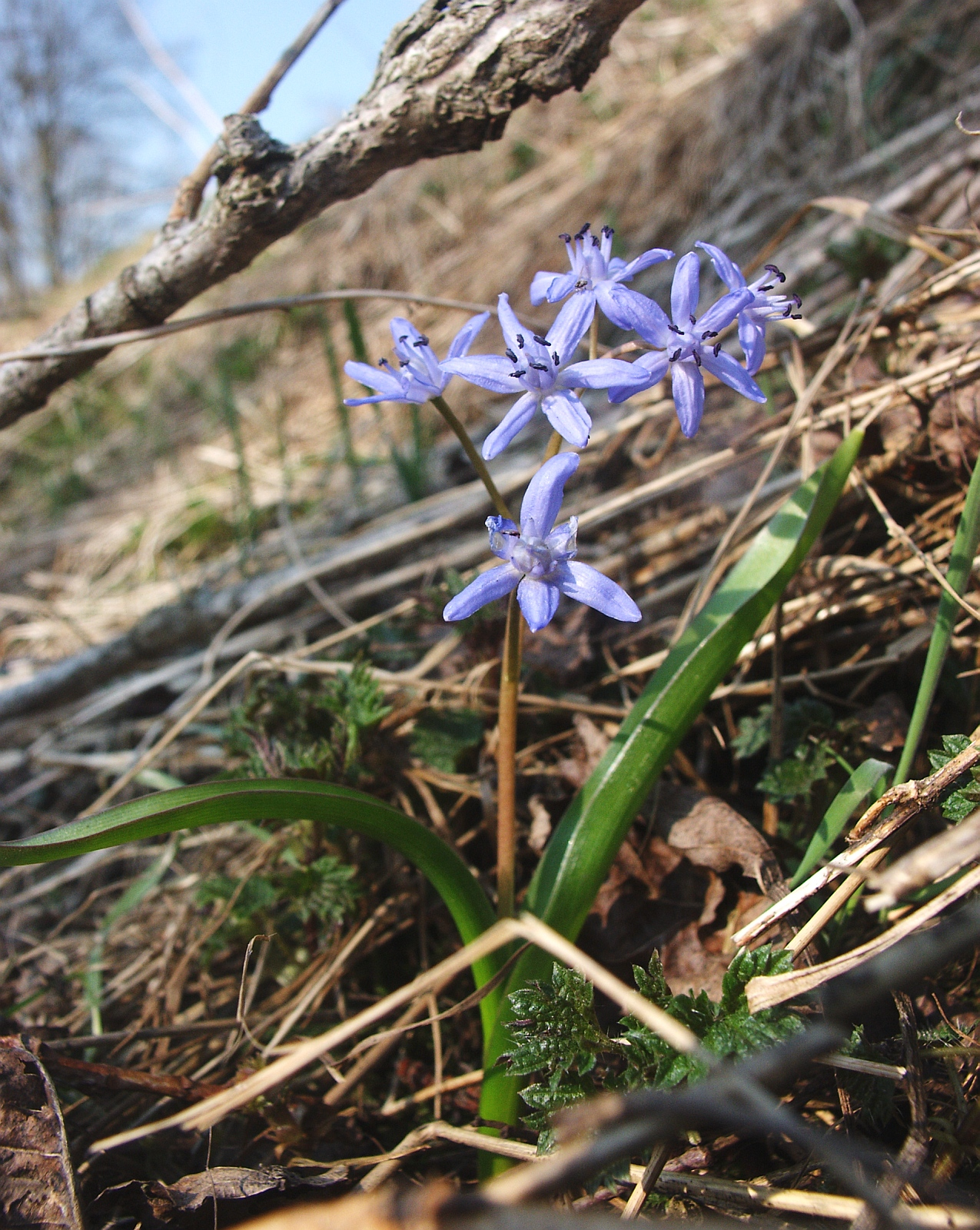

Scientific classification
- Kingdom: Plantae
- Clade: Tracheophytes
- Clade: Angiosperms
- Clade: Monocots
- Order: Asparagales
- Family: Asparagaceae
- Subfamily: Scilloideae
- Genus: Scilla
- Species: S. bifolia

Binomial name
- Scilla bifolia L.

= Scilla bifolia =

Species of flowering plant

Scilla bifolia, the alpine squill or two-leaf squill, is a herbaceous perennial plant growing from an underground bulb, belonging to the genus Scilla of the family Asparagaceae.

The Latin specific epithet bifolia means "twin leaved".

== Description ==
Scilla bifolia grows from a bulb 1–2 cm (0.4–0.8 in) across. There are two or rarely three lance-shaped, curved, fleshy and shiny leaves and the bases of the leaves clasp up to about the half of the stem (amplexicaul).

The flowering stems are erect and unbranched, 10–20 cm (4–8 in) high. The raceme bears 6-10 flowers, each 1 cm (0.4 in) across.

The flowers of Scilla bifolia are upward-facing, unlike the nodding flowers of Scilla siberica (Siberian squill). They bloom from early to late spring. The six tepals are deep violet-blue, more rarely white, pink, or purple. The fruit is a capsule 6–8 mm (0.2–0.3 in) across.

S. bifolia has gained the Royal Horticultural Society's Award of Garden Merit.

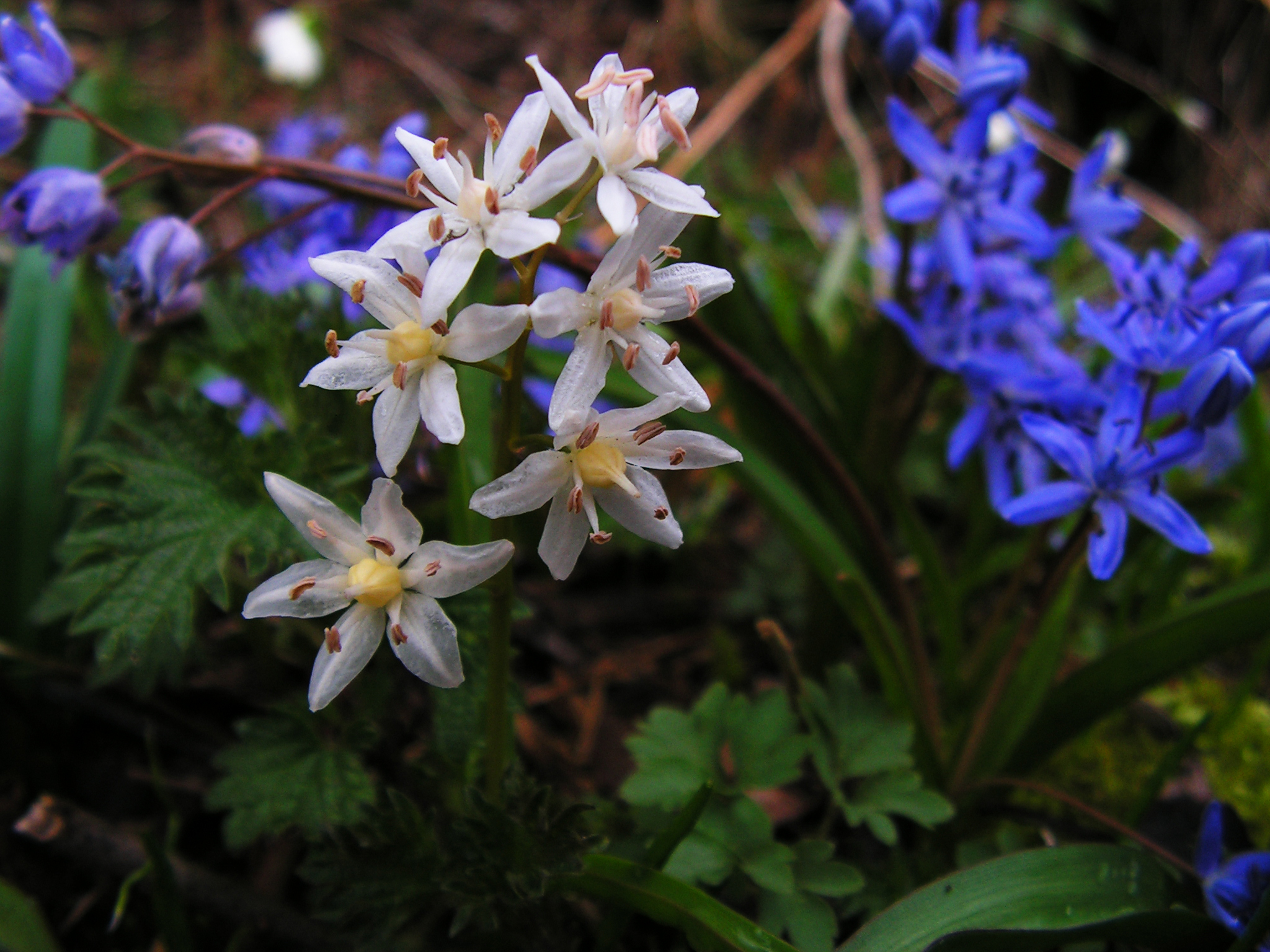
White form

== Taxonomy ==
=== Subspecies ===
- Scilla bifolia subsp. bifolia
- Scilla bifolia subsp. buekkensis (Speta) Soó
- Scilla bifolia subsp. rara Trávníček
- Scilla bifolia subsp. spetana (Kereszty) Trávníček

Cultivars

The cultivated variety 'Rosea' has pale pink or white flowers.

=== Synonyms ===
Synonyms of Scilla bifolia include:

- Adenoscilla bifolia (L.) Gren.
- Anthericum bifolium (L.) Scop. [1771]
- Genlisa bifolia (L.) Raf. [1840]
- Hyacinthus bifolia (L.) E.H.L.Krause in Sturm [1906]
- Ornithogalum bifolium (L.) Neck. [1770]
- Scilla alpina Schur [1852]
- Scilla carnea Sweet [1830]
- Scilla decidua Speta [1976]
- Scilla dubia K.Koch [1847]
- Scilla longistylosa Speta [1976]
- Scilla minor K.Koch [1847]
- Scilla nivalis Boiss. [1844]
- Scilla pleiophylla Speta [1980]
- Scilla resslii Speta [1977]
- Scilla secunda Janka [1856]
- Scilla silvatica Czetz [1872]
- Scilla uluensis Speta [1976]
- Scilla voethorum Speta [1980]
- Scilla xanthandra K.Koch [1847]
- Stellaris bifolia (L.) Moench

== Distribution ==
Scilla bifolia is native to Europe and western Russia south through Turkey to Syria. The plant is found in shady places, woods of beech or deciduous trees, and mountain grasslands. It grows at an altitude of 100–2,000 m (330–6,560 ft) above sea level.

== Gallery ==
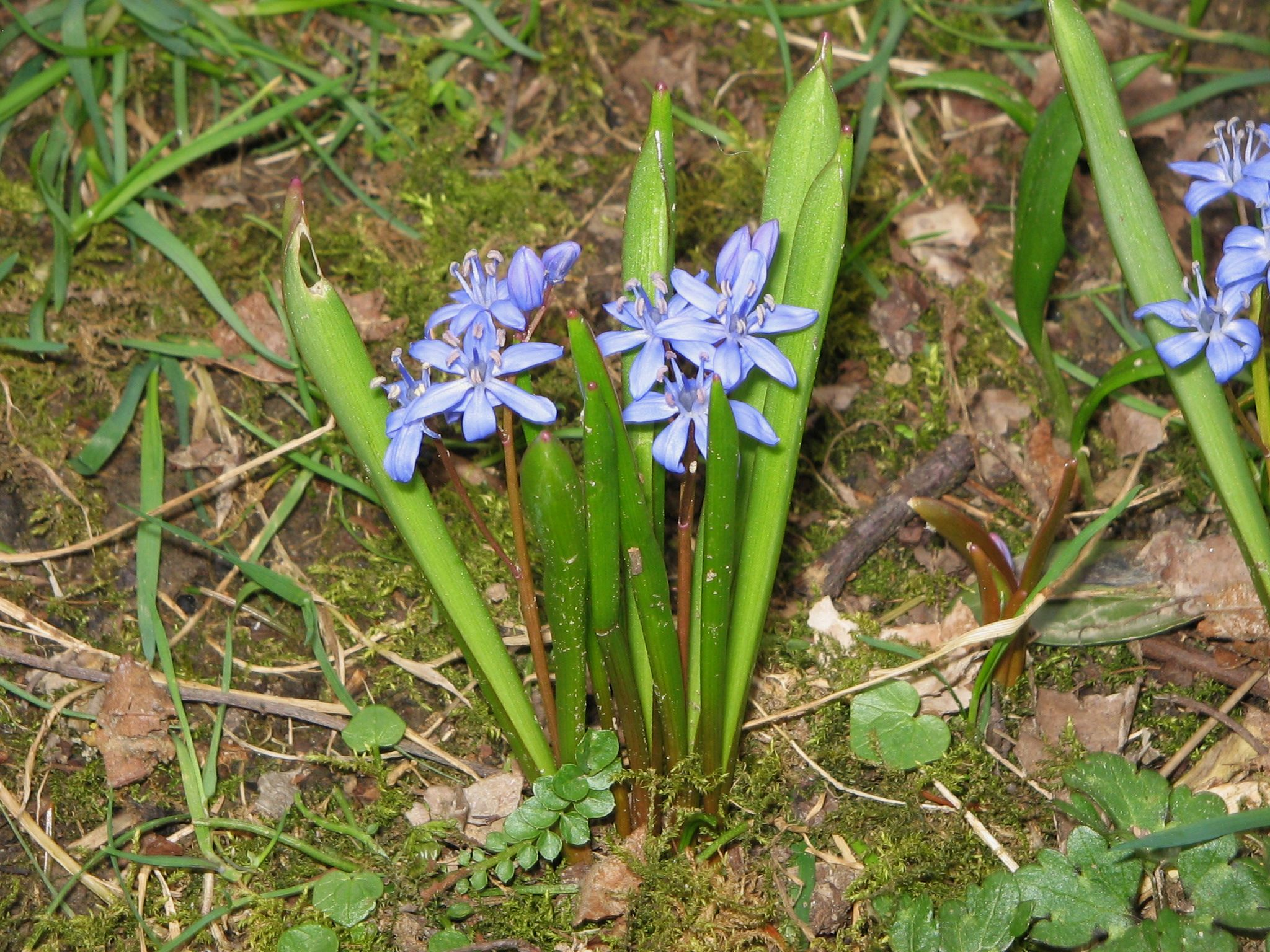

== See also ==
- List of Scilla species
