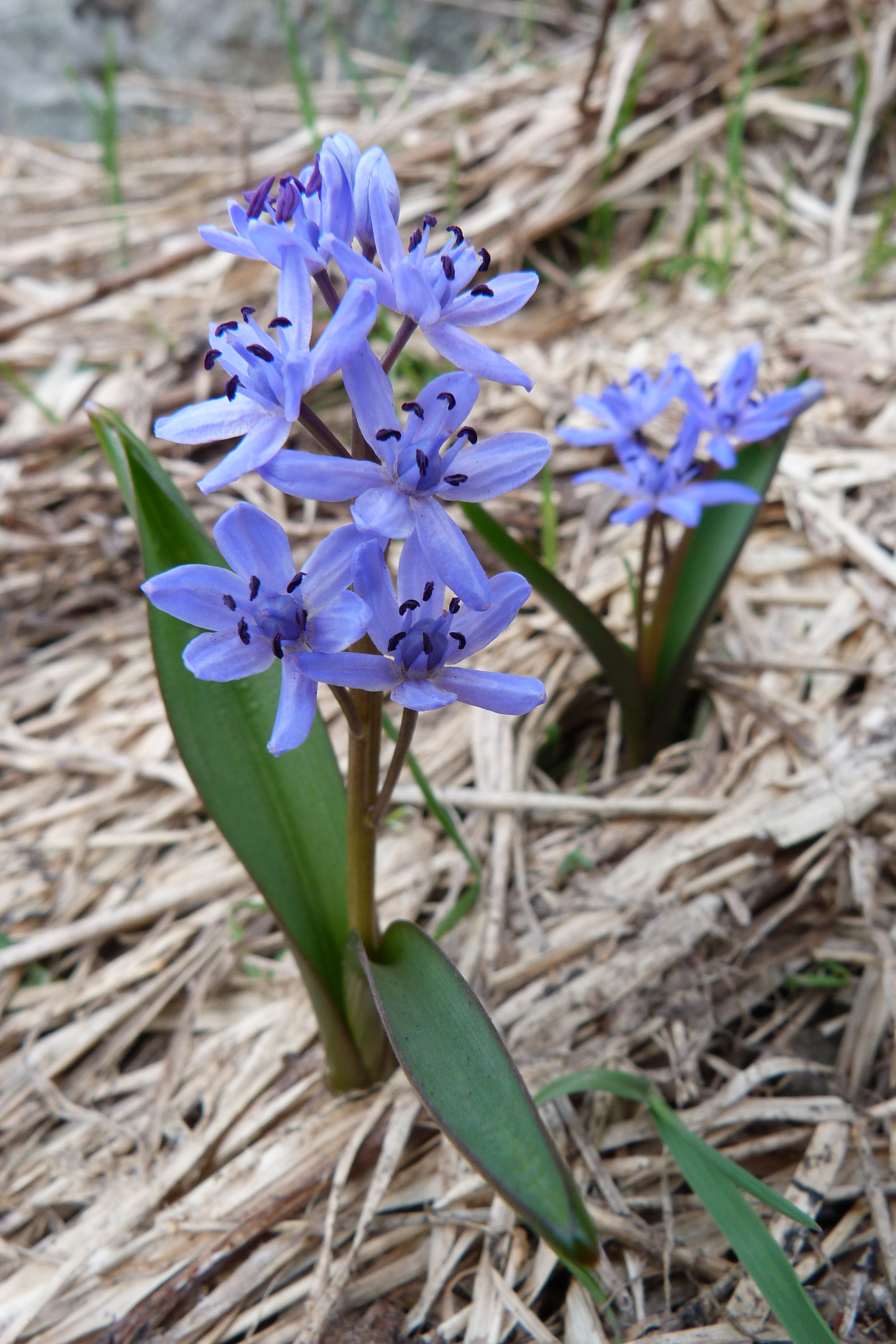
- Scilla bifolia

Scientific classification
- Kingdom: Plantae
- Clade: Tracheophytes
- Clade: Angiosperms
- Clade: Monocots
- Order: Asparagales
- Family: Asparagaceae
- Subfamily: Scilloideae
- Genus: Scilla; L.

Type species
- Scilla bifolia L.

Sections
- Scilla; Chionodoxa Boiss.

Synonyms
- Stellaris Fabr.; Stellaster Heist. ex Fabr; Lilio-Hyacinthus Ortega; Epimenidion Raf.; Ioncomelos Raf.; Lagocodes Raf.; Oncostema Raf.; Tractema Raf.; Genlisa Raf.; Chionodoxa Boiss.; Nectaroscilla Parl.; Adenoscilla Gren. & Godr.; Basaltogeton Salisb.; Hylomenes Salisb.; Monocallis Salisb.; Othocallis Salisb.; Petranthe Salisb.; Rinopodium Salisb.; Caloscilla Jord. & Fourr.; ×Chionoscilla J.Allen ex Nicholson; Apsanthea Jord. in C.T.A.Jordan & J.P.Fourreau; Autonoe (Webb & Berthel.) Speta; Chouardia Speta; Pfosseria Speta; Schnarfia Speta

= List of Scilla species =

This list of Scilla species shows the accepted species names within the genus Scilla, which are predominantly spring perennial plants in the order of Asparagales, and the Asparagaceae (amaryllis) family. The common name is squill, but this has also been applied to a number of taxa not included in Scilla.

The number of species varies from 30 to about 80, depending on how narrowly or widely the genus is defined. In the narrow circumscription (e.g Speta 1998) a number of species are segregated into eight separate smaller genera. Species of Chionodoxa are often included with Scilla and some classifications list those as a separate section of the genus Scilla (section Chionodoxa) (sec, all other species being included in section Scilla.

== List ==
As of 2022, Plants of the World Online accepted the following species:

- Scilla achtenii De Wild.
- Scilla africana Borzí & Mattei
- Scilla albanica Turrill
- Scilla albinerve Yildirim & Gemici
- Scilla alinihatiana Aslan & Yildirim
- Scilla amoena L. – star squill, star hyacinth
- Scilla andria Speta
- Scilla antunesii Engl.
- Scilla arenaria Baker
- Scilla arsusiana Yildirim & Gemici
- Scilla begoniifolia A.Chev.
- Scilla benguellensis Baker
- Scilla berthelotii Webb & Berthel.
- Scilla bifolia L. – alpine squill
- Scilla bilgineri Yildirim
- Scilla bithynica Boiss. – Bithynian squill
- Scilla buekkensis Speta
- Scilla bussei Dammer
- Scilla chlorantha Baker
- Scilla ciliata Baker
- Scilla cilicica Siehe
- Scilla congesta Baker
- Scilla cretica (Boiss. & Heldr.) Speta, syn. Chionodoxa cretica
- Scilla cydonia Speta
- Scilla dimartinoi Brullo & Pavone
- Scilla dualaensis Poelln.
- Scilla engleri T.Durand & Schinz
- Scilla flaccidula Baker
- Scilla forbesii (Baker) Speta, syn. Chionodoxa forbesii
- Scilla gabunensis Baker
- Scilla gracillima Engl.
- Scilla haemorrhoidalis Webb & Berthel.
- Scilla hildebrandtii Baker
- Scilla huanica Poelln.
- Scilla hyacinthoides L.
- Scilla ingridiae Speta
- Scilla jaegeri K.Krause
- Scilla katendensis De Wild.
- Scilla kladnii Schur
- Scilla kurdistanica Speta
- Scilla lakusicii Šilic
- Scilla latifolia Willd. ex Schult.f.
- Scilla laxiflora Baker
- Scilla ledienii Engl.
- Scilla leepii Speta
- Scilla libanotica Speta
- Scilla lilio-hyacinthus L. – Pyrenean squill
- Scilla litardierei Breistr., syn. Chouardia litardierei, Scilla amethystina, Scilla pratensis, Scilla albanica, Scilla italica – amethyst meadow squill, Dalmatian scilla
- Scilla lochiae (Meikle) Speta, syn. Chionodoxa lochiae
- Scilla longistylosa Speta
- Scilla luciliae (Boiss.) Speta, syn. Chionodoxa luciliae
- Scilla lucis Speta
- Scilla madeirensis Menezes – Madeiran squill
- Scilla melaina Speta
- Scilla merinoi S.Ortiz, Rodr.Oubiña & Izco
- Scilla mesopotamica Speta
- Scilla messeniaca Boiss.
- Scilla mischtschenkoana Grossh., syn. Scilla tubergeniana – Tubergen squill
- Scilla monanthos K.Koch
- Scilla monophyllos Link
- Scilla morrisii Meikle
- Scilla nana (Schult. & Schult.f.) Speta, syn. Chionodoxa nana
- Scilla nivalis Boiss.
- Scilla oubangluensis Hua
- Scilla paui Lacaita
- Scilla peruviana L. – Portuguese squill, corymbose squill, Cuban lily
- Scilla petersii Engl.
- Scilla platyphylla Baker
- Scilla pleiophylla Speta
- Scilla pneumonanthe Speta
- Scilla reuteri Speta
- Scilla rosenii K.Koch
- Scilla sardensis (Whittall ex Barr & Sugden) Speta, syn. Chionodoxa sardensis
- Scilla schweinfurthii Engl.
- Scilla siberica Andrews
- Scilla simiarum Baker
- Scilla sodalicia N.E.Br.
- Scilla subnivalis (Halácsy) Speta
- Scilla tayloriana Rendle
- Scilla textilis Rendle
- Scilla uyuiensis Rendle.
- Scilla vardaria Yildirim & Gemici
- Scilla verdickii De Wild.
- Scilla verna Huds. – spring squill
- Scilla villosa Desf.
- Scilla vindobonensis Speta
- Scilla voethorum Speta
- Scilla welwitschii Poelln.
- Scilla werneri De Wild.

== Hybrids ==
A hybrid has been named:

- Scilla × allenii (G.Nicholson) Speta

== Renamed within genus Scilla ==
- Scilla siehei – glory-of-the-snow: see Scilla forbesii

== Formerly included ==
The common bluebell of British and European bluebell woods, still occasionally referred to by a former name, Scilla non-scripta, is now known as Hyacinthoides non-scripta. Several African species previously classified in Scilla have been removed to the genus Ledebouria. The best known of these is the common houseplant still sometimes known as Scilla violacea but now properly Ledebouria socialis.

- Scilla autumnalis – autumn squill: see Prospero autumnale
- Scilla maritima – sea squill: see Drimia maritima
- Scilla nutans – common bluebell: see Hyacinthoides non-scripta

== Bibliography ==
- Speta, Franz (1998a). "Hyacintheae". In Kubitzki, Klaus; Huber, Herbert (eds.). Flowering plants. Monocotyledons: Lilianae (except Orchidaceae). The families and genera of vascular plants. Vol. 3. Berlin: Springer-Verlag. pp. 261–285. ISBN 3-540-64060-6.
- Speta, F (14 August 1998b). "Systematische Analyse der Gattung Scilla L. s.l. (Hyacinthaceae)" [Systematic analysis of the genus Scilla L. s.l. (Hyacinthaceae)]. Phyton. 38 (1): 1–141.
- Trávníèček, Bohumil; Duchoslav, Martin; Šarhanová, Petra & Šafáøová, Lenka (2009), "Squills (Scilla s.lat., Hyacinthaceae) in the flora of the Czech Republic, with taxonomical notes on Central-European squill populations" (PDF), Acta Musei Moraviae, Scientiae Biologicae (Brno), 94: 157–205
- POWO (2022). "Scilla L." Plants of the World Online. Royal Botanic Gardens, Kew.
- WCSP (2022). "Scilla L., Sp. Pl.: 308 (1753)". Royal Botanic Gardens, Kew.
- McNeill, J (2002). "Scilla Linnaeus, Sp. Pl. 1: 308. 1753; Gen. Pl. ed. 5, 146. 1754". Flora of North America. New York: Oxford University Press. p. 58.
