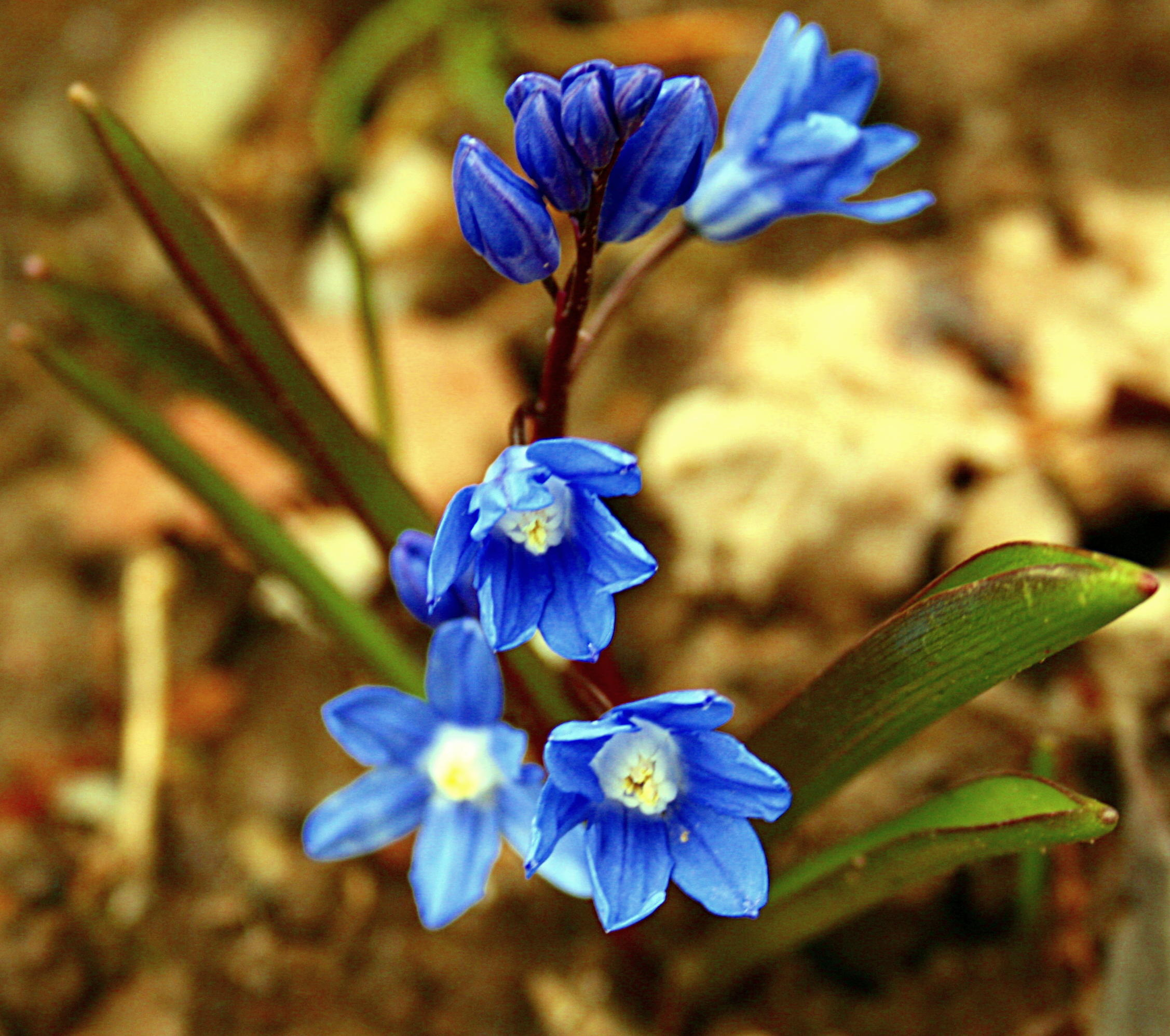

Scientific classification
- Kingdom: Plantae
- Clade: Tracheophytes
- Clade: Angiosperms
- Clade: Monocots
- Order: Asparagales
- Family: Asparagaceae
- Subfamily: Scilloideae
- Genus: Scilla
- Section: Scilla sect. Chionodoxa
- Species: S. sardensis

Binomial name
- Scilla sardensis (Whittall ex Barr & Sugden) Speta

Synonyms
- Chionodoxa sardensis Whittall ex Barr & Sugden; Chionodoxa luciliae var. sardensis (Whittall ex Barr & Sugden) D.K.

= Scilla sardensis =

Species of flowering plant

Scilla sardensis, the lesser glory-of-the-snow, is a bulbous perennial from west Turkey flowering in early spring. After flowering, it goes into dormancy until the next spring. It belongs to a group of Scilla species that were formerly put in a separate genus, Chionodoxa, and may now be treated as Scilla sect. Chionodoxa.

== Description ==
Like all members of the former genus Chionodoxa, the bases of the stamens are flattened and closely clustered in the middle of the flower. In other species of Scilla, the stamens are not flattened or clustered together.

Scilla sardensis resembles S. forbesii, but has a less distinct white 'eye'. Each bulb produces two-three leaves, up to 13.6 cm long and 1.5 cm wide, and at most one flowering stem, up to 14 cm long. The flowers are produced in a loose pyramidal to one-sided raceme, with up to 22 flowers per stem. Each flower is up to 2.5 cm across, with individual tepals 1.5 cm long. The tepals are violet-blue, somewhat paler at the base, producing a paler 'eye' at the centre of the flower. The stamen bases are white.

== Distribution ==
Scilla sardensis is native to western Turkey. It has a restricted distribution in the Bozdağ Mountains in İzmir Province.

== Cultivation ==
This plant has gained the Royal Horticultural Society's Award of Garden Merit (confirmed 2017).

== See also ==
- List of Scilla species

== Bibliography ==
- Dashwood, Melanie & Mathew, Brian (2005), Hyacinthaceae – little blue bulbs (RHS Plant Trials and Awards, Bulletin Number 11), Royal Horticultural Society, archived from the original on 28 August 2015
- Mathew, Brian (1987), The Smaller Bulbs, London: B T Batsford, ISBN 978-0-7134-4922-8
- Mathew, Brian (2005), "Hardy Hyacinthaceae, Part 2: Scilla, Chionodoxa, xChionoscilla", The Plantsman, New Series, 4 (2): 110–21
- Yildirim, H.; Yetisen, K.; Özdemir, A. & Özdemir, C. (2017), "An Anatomical Study of Scilla (Scilloideae) Section Chionodoxa and Scilla bifolia in Turkey" (PDF), Planta Daninha, 35: e017162495, doi:10.1590/s0100-83582017350100004
