= Scilla × allenii =

Scientific classification
- Kingdom: Plantae
- Clade: Tracheophytes
- Clade: Angiosperms
- Clade: Monocots
- Order: Asparagales
- Family: Asparagaceae
- Subfamily: Scilloideae
- Genus: Scilla
- Species: S. × allenii

Binomial name
- Scilla × allenii (G.Nicholson) Speta

Synonyms
- × Chionoscilla allenii G.Nicholson; Chionodoxa × allenii (G.Nicholson) L.H.Bailey

Species of flowering plant

Scilla × allenii is a hybrid between two species of flowering plants, both of which are now placed in the genus Scilla. One of the parents is Scilla bifolia. As of March 2020, sources differ as to the identity of the other, which may be either Scilla forbesii (syn. S. siehei) or Scilla luciliae.

== Description ==
Like its parents, Scilla × allenii grows from bulbs and flowers freely in early spring. The flowers are various shades of blue from lilac to violet and are intermediate in size between those of the parents, up to 2.5 cm in diameter when fully open. As with most hybrids, individual plants vary; some have been given cultivar names. 'Frà Angelico', with pale blue flowers, has gained the Royal Horticultural Society's Award of Garden Merit (confirmed 2017).

== Taxonomy ==
The hybrid was first described by G. Nicholson in 1897. The specific epithet allenii refers to the discoverer of the hybrids, James Allen. He noticed them in his garden in Shepton Mallet, England, at the end of the nineteenth century.

At the time the hybrid was named, one of its parents was placed in the genus Chionodoxa. Accordingly, a hybrid genus name was used, this species being × Chionoscilla allenii. As of March 2020, the World Checklist of Selected Plant Families regards Chionodoxa as part of Scilla, in which case the hybrid genus name is not needed.

== Distribution ==
The original hybrid was discovered in cultivation in England. Spontaneous occurrence has been reported on the Nif Mountain in İzmir Province, Turkey.
