= Botanical nomenclature =

Scientific naming of algae, fungi and plants

Botanical nomenclature is the formal, scientific naming of plants. It is related to, but distinct from taxonomy. Plant taxonomy is concerned with grouping and classifying plants; botanical nomenclature then provides names for the results of this process. The starting point for modern botanical nomenclature is Linnaeus' Species Plantarum of 1753. Botanical nomenclature is governed by the International Code of Nomenclature for algae, fungi, and plants (ICNafp), which replaces the International Code of Botanical Nomenclature (ICBN). Fossil plants are also covered by the code of nomenclature.

Within the limits set by that code there is another set of rules, the International Code of Nomenclature for Cultivated Plants (ICNCP) which applies to plant cultivars that have been deliberately altered or selected by humans (see cultigen).

Botanical nomenclature is independent of other systems of nomenclature, for example zoological nomenclature. This implies that animals can have the same generic names as plants (e.g. there is a genus Iris in plants and a genus Iris in animals). It also allows them to follow slightly different rules, e.g. animals can have the same genus and species name, e.g. Pica pica, but the ICNafp does not allow this.

== History and scope ==
Botanical nomenclature has a long history, going back beyond the period when Latin was the scientific language throughout Europe, to Theophrastus (c. 370–287 BC), Dioscorides (c. 40 – 90 AD) and other Greek writers. Many of these works have come down to us in Latin translations. The principal Latin writer on botany was Pliny the Elder (23–79 AD). From Mediaeval times, Latin became the universal scientific language (lingua franca) in Europe. Most written plant knowledge was the property of monks, particularly Benedictine, and the purpose of those early herbals was primarily medicinal rather than plant science per se. It would require the invention of the printing press (1450) to make such information more widely available.

Leonhart Fuchs, a German physician and botanist, is often considered the originator of Latin names for the rapidly increasing number of plants known to science. For instance he coined the name Digitalis in his De Historia Stirpium Commentarii Insignes (1542).

A key event was Linnaeus’ adoption of binomial names for plant species in his Species Plantarum (1753).

In the nineteenth century it became increasingly clear that there was a need for rules to govern scientific nomenclature, and initiatives were taken to refine the body of laws initiated by Linnaeus. These were published in successively more sophisticated editions. For plants, key dates are 1867 (lois de Candolle) and 1906 (International Rules of Botanical Nomenclature, 'Vienna Rules'). The most recent is the Shenzhen Code, adopted in 2018.

Another development was the insight into the delimitation of the concept of 'plant'. Gradually more and more groups of organisms are being recognised as being independent of plants. Nevertheless, the formal names of most of these organisms are governed by the (ICN), even today. Some protists that do not fit easily into either plant or animal categories are treated under either or both of the ICN and the ICZN. A separate Code was adopted to govern the nomenclature of Bacteria, the International Code of Nomenclature of Bacteria.

== Relationship to taxonomy ==
Botanical nomenclature is closely linked to plant taxonomy, and botanical nomenclature serves plant taxonomy, but nevertheless botanical nomenclature is separate from plant taxonomy. Botanical nomenclature is merely the body of rules prescribing which name applies to that taxon (see correct name) and if a new name may (or must) be coined.

Plant taxonomy is an empirical science, a science that determines what constitutes a particular taxon (taxonomic grouping, plural: taxa): e.g. "What plants belong to this species?" and "What species belong to this genus?". The definition of the limits of a taxon is called its 'circumscription'. For a particular taxon, if two taxonomists agree exactly on its circumscription, rank and position (i.e. the higher rank in which it is included) then there is only one name which can apply under the ICN. Where they differ in opinion on any of these issues, one and the same plant may be placed in taxa with different names. As an example, consider Siehe's Glory-of-the-Snow, Chionodoxa siehei:

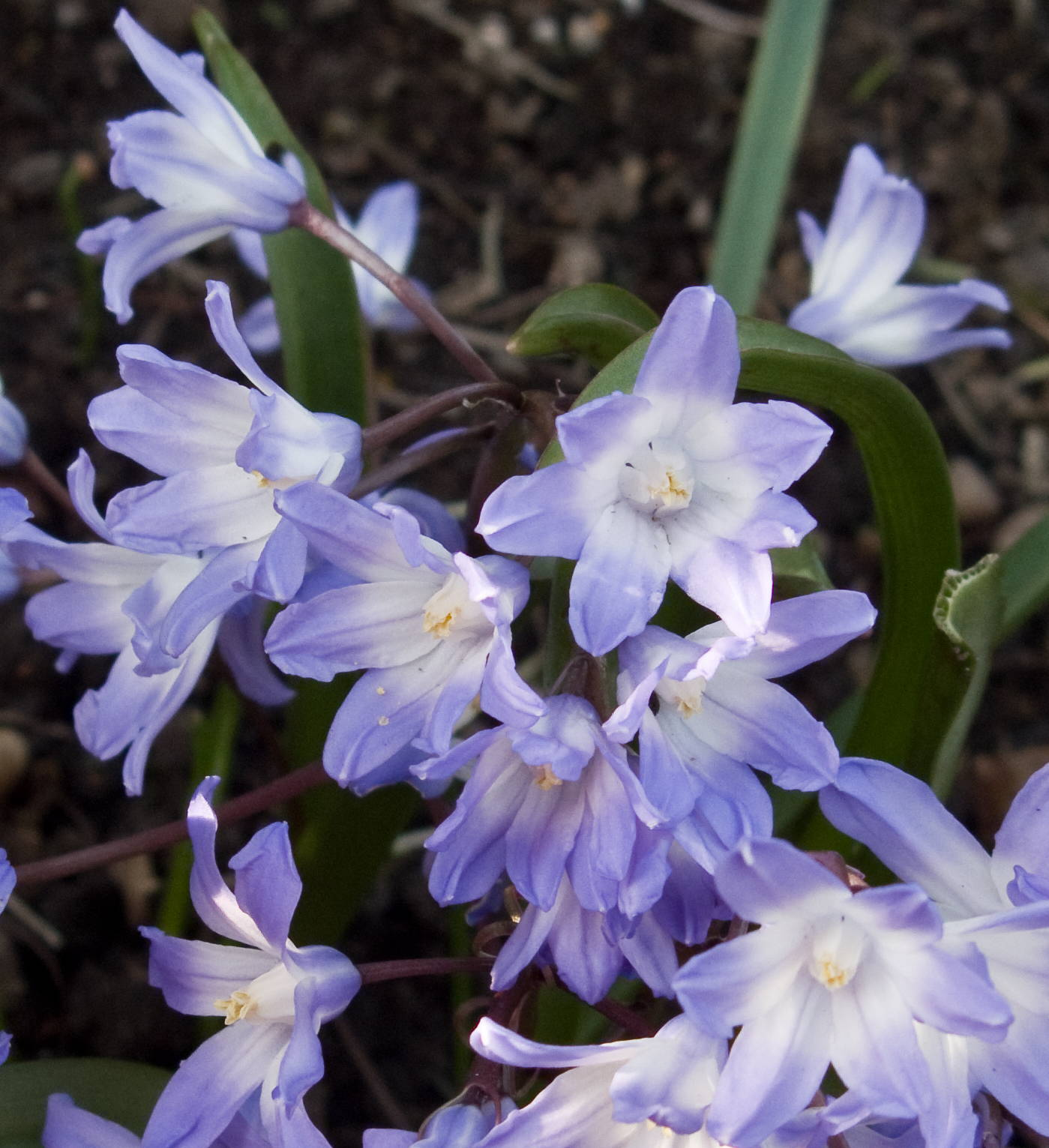
Flowers of Chionodoxa siehei, which can also be called Scilla siehei, or included in Chionodoxa forbesii or in Scilla forbesii

- Taxonomists can disagree as to whether two groups of plants are sufficiently distinct to be put into one species or not. Thus Chionodoxa siehei and Chionodoxa forbesii have been treated as a single species by some taxonomists or as two species by others. If treated as one species, the earlier published name must be used, so plants previously called Chionodoxa siehei become Chionodoxa forbesii.
- Taxonomists can disagree as to whether two genera are sufficiently distinct to be kept separate or not. While agreeing that the genus Chionodoxa is closely related to the genus Scilla, nevertheless the bulb specialist Brian Mathew considers that their differences warrant maintaining separate genera. Others disagree, and would refer to Chionodoxa siehei as Scilla siehei. The earliest published genus name must be used when genera are merged; in this case Scilla was published earlier and is used (not Chionodoxa).
- Taxonomists can disagree as to the limits of families. When the Angiosperm Phylogeny Group (APG) first published its classification of the flowering plants in 1998, Chionodoxa siehei would have been placed in the family Hyacinthaceae. In the 2009 revision of their classification, the APG no longer recognize the Hyacinthaceae as a separate family, merging it into a greatly enlarged family Asparagaceae. Thus Chionodoxa siehei moves from the Hyacinthaceae to the Asparagaceae.
- Taxonomists can disagree as to the rank of a taxon. Rather than allow the Hyacinthaceae to disappear altogether, Chase et al. suggested that it be treated as a subfamily within the Asparagaceae. The ICN requires family names to end with "-aceae" and subfamily names to end with "-oideae". Thus a possible name for the Hyacinthaceae when treated as a subfamily would be 'Hyacinthoideae'. However, the name Scilloideae had already been published in 1835 as the name for a subfamily containing the genus Scilla, so this name has priority and must be used. Hence for those taxonomists who accept the APG system of 2009, Chionodoxa siehei can be placed in the subfamily Scilloideae of the family Asparagaceae. However, a taxonomist is perfectly free to continue to argue that Hyacinthaceae should be maintained as a separate family from the other families which were merged into the Asparagaceae.

In summary, if a plant has different names or is placed in differently named taxa:

- If the confusion is purely nomenclatural, i.e. it concerns what to call a taxon which has the same circumscription, rank and position, the ICN provides rules to settle the differences, typically by prescribing that the earliest published name must be used, although names can be conserved.
- If the confusion is taxonomic, i.e. taxonomists differ in opinion on the circumscription, rank or position of taxa, then only more scientific research can settle the differences, and even then only sometimes.

== Accepted names ==
Various botanical databases such as Plants of the World Online and World Flora Online make determinations as to whether a name is accepted, e.g. accepted species. If a name is not accepted, it may be because the name is a synonym for a name that is already accepted, and is listed as such. Another term is ambiguous to denote a name that is not accepted because its separate existence cannot be reliably determined.

== See also ==
=== General ===
- Scientific classification
- Binomial nomenclature
- Nomenclature Codes

=== Botany ===
- Botanical name
- International Code of Nomenclature for algae, fungi, and plants
  - Correct name (botany)
  - Author citation (botany)
  - Hybrid name (botany)
- International Code of Nomenclature for Cultivated Plants
- International Plant Names Index: lists names of published seed plants and ferns
- International Association for Plant Taxonomy
- Paleobotany

== Bibliography ==
- Pavord, Anna (2005). The naming of names the search for order in the world of plants. New York: Bloomsbury. ISBN 9781596919655.
- Stearn, William T. (1992) [1966]. Botanical Latin : history, grammar, syntax, terminology and vocabulary (4 ed.). Portland, Or.: Timber Press. ISBN 9780881923216.
- Stearn, William T. (2002) [1992]. Stearn's dictionary of plant names for gardeners : a handbook on the origin and meaning of the botanical names of some cultivated plants. Portland, Or.: Timber Press. ISBN 978-0881925562.
- Bernhardt, Peter (2008). Gods and goddesses in the garden : Greco-Roman mythology and the scientific names of plants. New Brunswick, N.J.: Rutgers University Press. ISBN 9780813542669.
- Morgan, Michelle (October 2005). "Botanical Latin: The Poetry of Herb Names" (PDF). Number 89. MediHerb. Archived from the original (PDF) on 4 September 2012.
- Fuchs, Leonhart (1642). De Historia Stirpium Commentarii Insignes. Basileae: In officina Isingriniana.
