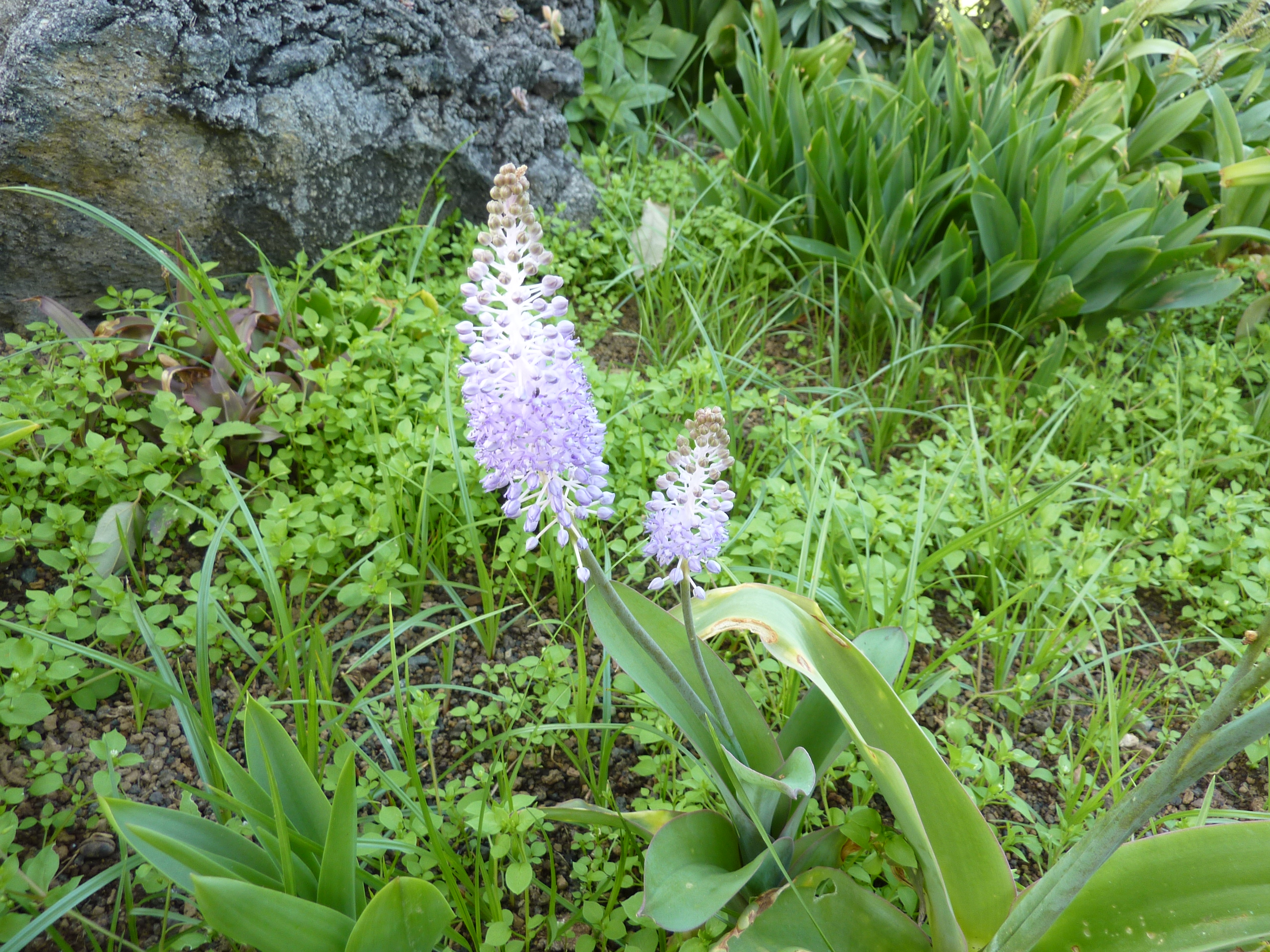

Conservation status
- Least Concern (IUCN 3.1)

Scientific classification
- Kingdom: Plantae
- Clade: Tracheophytes
- Clade: Angiosperms
- Clade: Monocots
- Order: Asparagales
- Family: Asparagaceae
- Subfamily: Scilloideae
- Genus: Scilla
- Species: S. madeirensis

Binomial name
- Scilla madeirensis Menezes

= Scilla madeirensis =

Species of flowering plant

Scilla madeirensis is a species of flowering plant in the family Asparagaceae, native to Madeira and the Savage Islands growing amongst volcanic rocks and along coastal cliff faces.

== Research ==
In 2003, the bulbs of the plant were found to contain 2,4-(4′-aminobenzenamine)pyrimidine, which has limited evidence as a α1-adrenergic receptor antagonist.

== See also ==
- List of Scilla species
