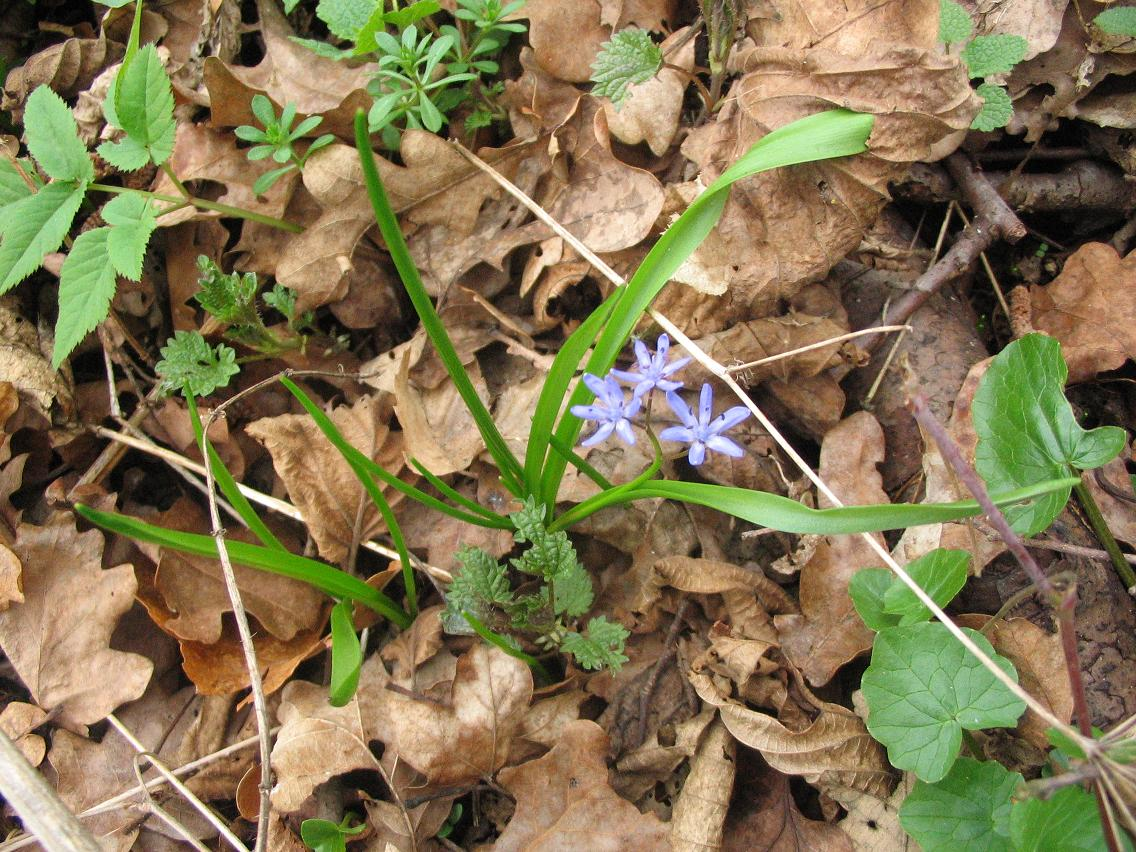

Scientific classification
- Kingdom: Plantae
- Clade: Tracheophytes
- Clade: Angiosperms
- Clade: Monocots
- Order: Asparagales
- Family: Asparagaceae
- Subfamily: Scilloideae
- Genus: Scilla
- Species: S. buekkensis

Binomial name
- Scilla buekkensis Speta

= Scilla buekkensis =

Species of flowering plant

Scilla buekkensis (syn. Scilla drunensis subsp. buekkensis (Speta) Kereszty) is a species of Scilla native to some beech and hornbeam forests in Hungary and Slovakia in Central Europe. Since species and subspecies of Scilla greatly vary in numbers of chromosomes, it is hard to tell whether two separate populations should be described as different subspecies or species. The plant derives its name from the Bükk Mountains in North-East Hungary.

It is a bulb-bearing herbaceous perennial plant. The flowering stem bears pyramidal raceme of a few flowers; each flower is blue, with six tepals, each 12 mm long and 2,5 mm wide. The flower has 4-7 ovules in each carpel. The flower's elaiosomes are pearl-like, and grouped to form a disc. It flowers from March to April.

This is a protected species in Hungary.

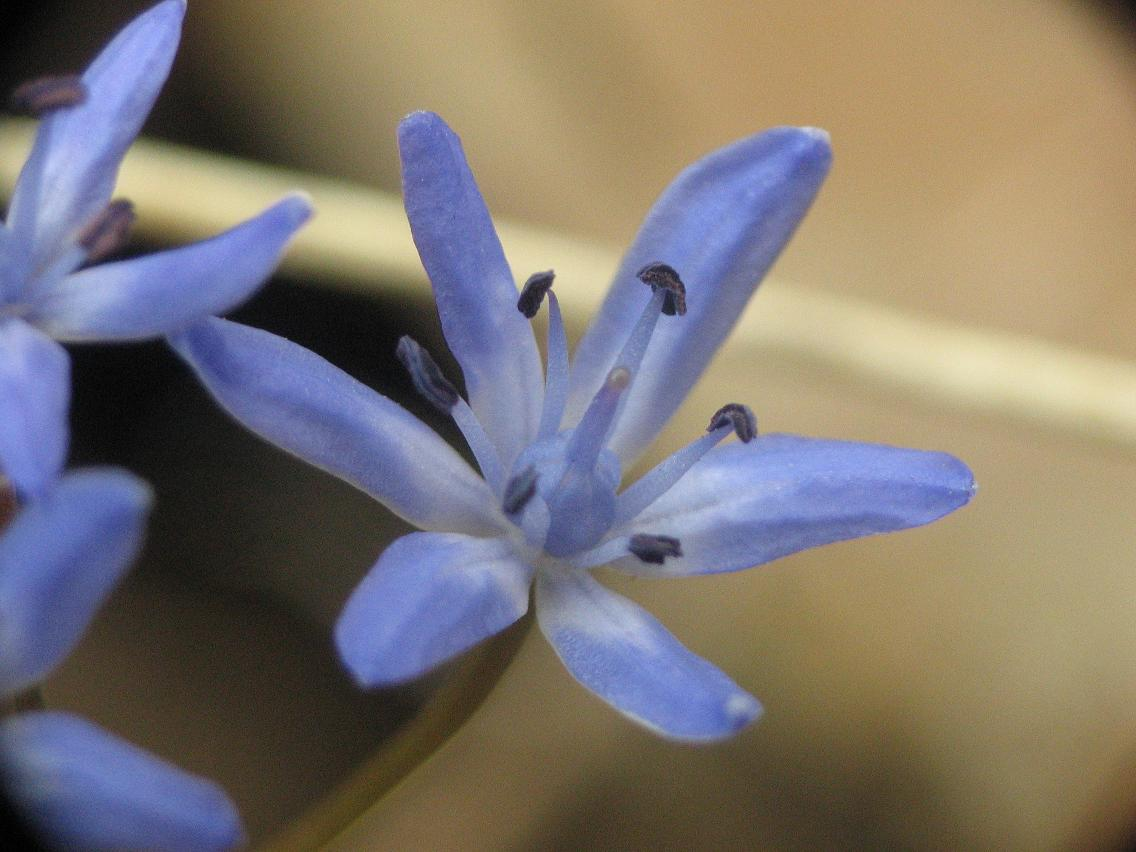
A flower of Scilla buekkensis

== See also ==
- List of Scilla species
