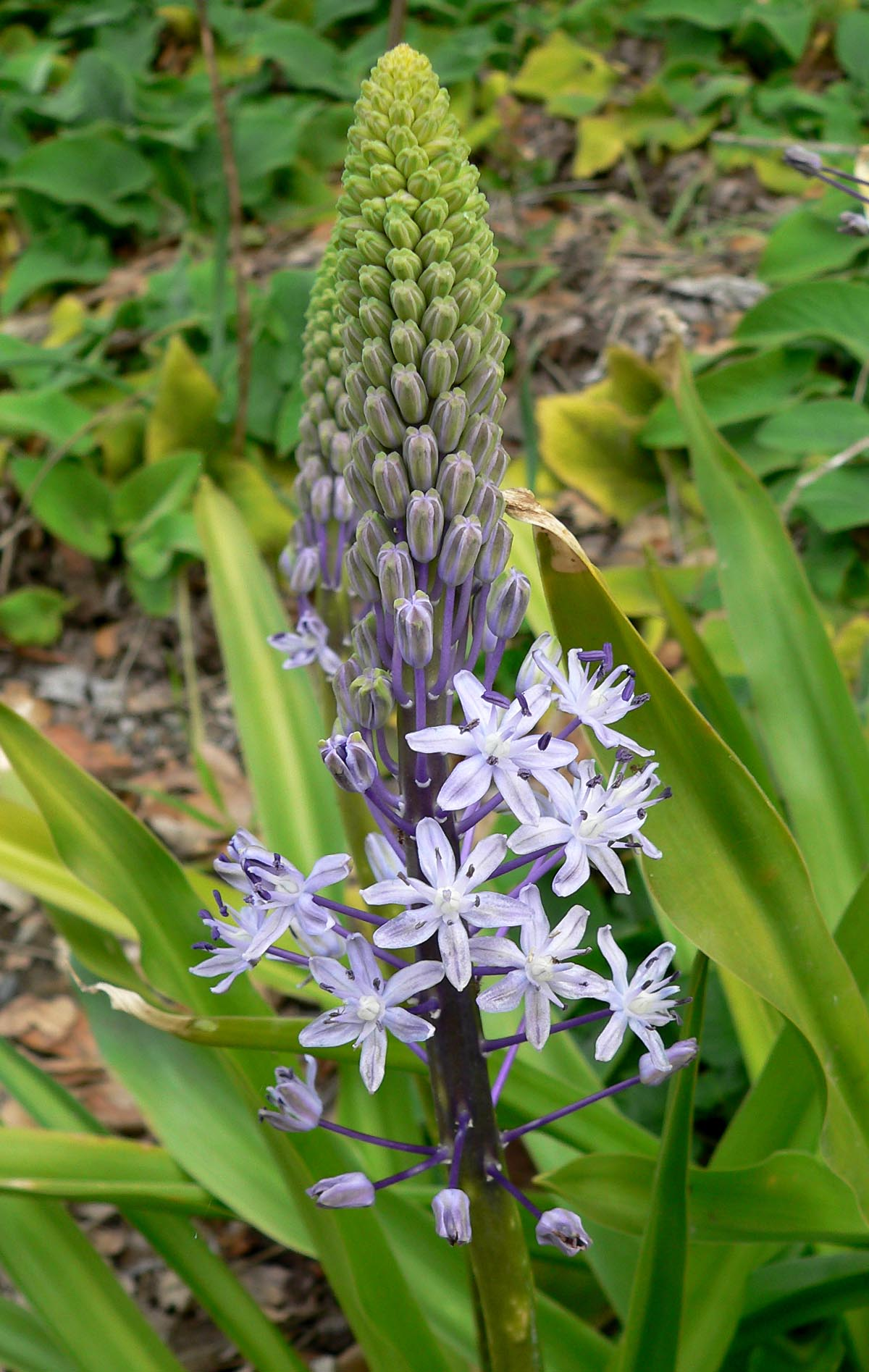

Scientific classification
- Kingdom: Plantae
- Clade: Tracheophytes
- Clade: Angiosperms
- Clade: Monocots
- Order: Asparagales
- Family: Asparagaceae
- Subfamily: Scilloideae
- Genus: Scilla
- Species: S. hyacinthoides

Binomial name
- Scilla hyacinthoides L.

= Scilla hyacinthoides =

Species of flowering plant

Scilla hyacinthoides is a geophyte, native to Southern Europe to Northern Iraq. Like all Scilla it is a bulbous plant.

== Habitat ==
Scilla hyacinthoides is native to France including Corsica, Italy (Sardegna, Sicilia), Greece including East Aegean Islands, Yugoslavia, and the Middle East with Turkey, Lebanon-Syria, Iraq and the Palestine region. It was introduced to Portugal, Spain, and Algeria, and in the US to Texas and Louisiana, as well as to South Australia.

== Description ==
It flowers in March to April with bluish-purple flowers on 1–1.5 m (3.3–4.9 ft) high flowering stalks.

== See also ==
- List of Scilla species

== Bibliography ==
- The Jerusalem Botanical Gardens site (Hebrew)
- Michael Zohary; Naomi Feinbrun-Dothan (1966-1986) Flora Palaestina
- Witztum A.and Negbi M. (1991) Primary xylem of Scilla hyacinthoides (Liliaceae) - the wool-bearing bulb of Theophrastus. Economical Botany 45:97-102
