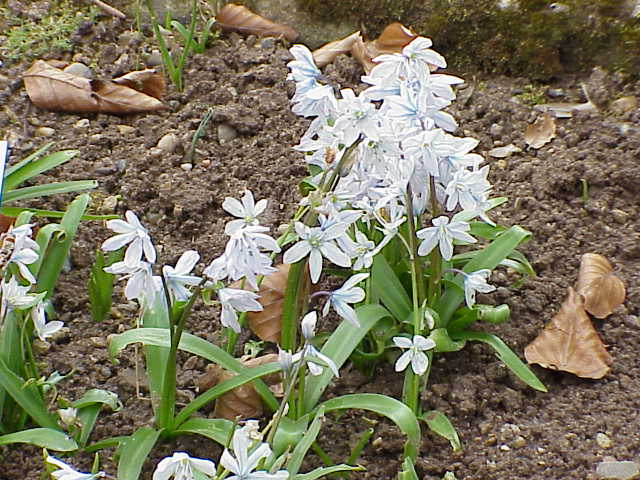

Scientific classification
- Kingdom: Plantae
- Clade: Tracheophytes
- Clade: Angiosperms
- Clade: Monocots
- Order: Asparagales
- Family: Asparagaceae
- Subfamily: Scilloideae
- Genus: Scilla
- Species: S. mischtschenkoana

Binomial name
- Scilla mischtschenkoana Grossh.

Synonyms
- Othocallis mischtschenkoana

= Scilla mischtschenkoana =

Species of flowering plant

Scilla mischtschenkoana, the Mishchenko or Misczenko squill, early squill or white squill, is a perennial plant that is native to the South Caucasus and northern Iran.

Each plant grows from a small bulb, with 2-3 strap shaped leaves and pale blue flowers with darker veins, blooming in early spring or late winter. Plants reach 5 to 15 cm (2.0 to 5.9 in) high and approximately 5 cm (2.0 in) wide.

S. mischtschenkoana and the cultivar 'Tubergeniana' have gained the Royal Horticultural Society's Award of Garden Merit.

== See also ==
- List of Scilla species
