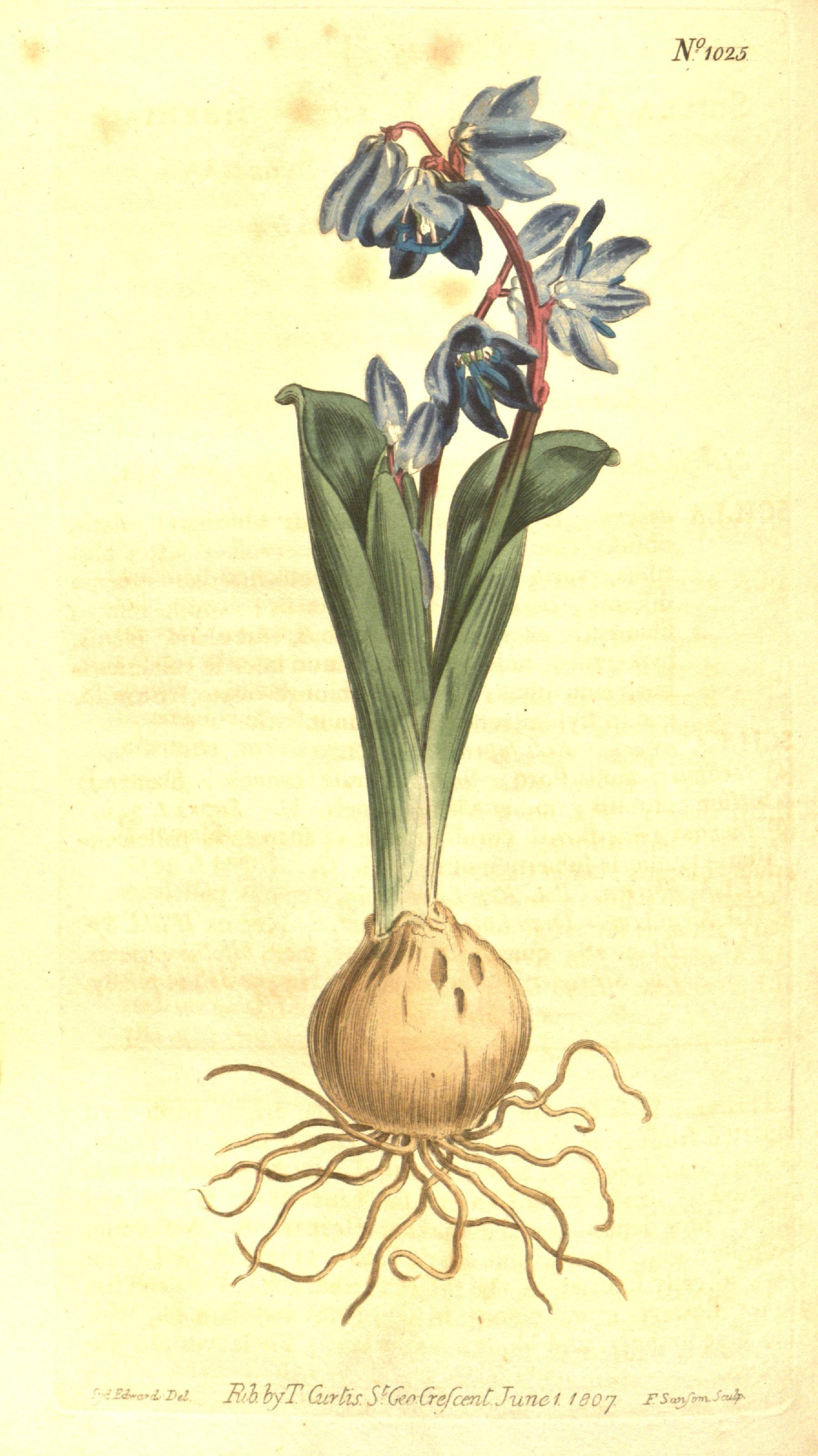

Scientific classification
- Kingdom: Plantae
- Clade: Tracheophytes
- Clade: Angiosperms
- Clade: Monocots
- Order: Asparagales
- Family: Asparagaceae
- Subfamily: Scilloideae
- Genus: Scilla
- Species: S. amoena

Binomial name
- Scilla amoena L.

Synonyms
- Hyacinthus amoenus (L.) E.H.L.Krause; Othocallis amoena (L.) Trávn.; Scilla amara Crantz

= Scilla amoena =

Species of flowering plant

Scilla amoena, the star hyacinth or squill, is a species of flowering plant in the genus Scilla.

== Description ==
Scilla amoena (star hyacinth or squill) is a perennial, bulbous herbaceous plant that grows to heights of 15–25 centimeters. It is a geophyte that forms bulbs, from which new growth appears in spring. The four to five (rarely three) basal, obtuse leaves are 20–30 cm long and 1.2–1.8 cm wide, light green and often reddish below, and longer than the scape.

There are one to three flower stems, that are angular and compressed. The bracts are 1-2.5 mm long. About 3–6 (rarely 1–15) upright flowers form a loose, racemose inflorescence, spreading into a star. The perianth has tepals that are light blue with a dark central vein, and whitish at the base, but a darker blue in their interior, and are 10–20 mm long by 4–5 mm wide. The pedicels are 10–20 mm in length and longer than the perianth. The seeds are more or less spherical, with a diameter of 3 mm.

The chromosome number is 2n = 12.

== Taxonomy ==
First formally described by Carl Linnaeus in 1753, as one of eight Scilla species.

=== Etymology ===
The specific epithet amoena derives from the Latin amoenus, indicating beautiful.

== Distribution and habitat ==
The natural range of Scilla amoena is most likely northern Turkey, but is naturalised in parts of southern Europe, including France, the Balkans and Romania, and also central Europe, including Bavaria, Lake Constance, Styria and Silesia. It is found in gardens, meadows and mixed deciduous forests.

== Ecology ==
The plant is proteranthous (leaves appear before the flower stems). The flowering period is from March to May. Pollination occurs through self-pollination or is entomogamous (by insects). Seed dispersal is by ants (myrmecochory).

== Cultivation ==
Occasionally used as an ornamental garden plant.

== Bibliography ==
- Linnaeus, Carl (1753). "Scilla". Species Plantarum: exhibentes plantas rite cognitas, ad genera relatas, cum differentiis specificis, nominibus trivialibus, synonymis selectis, locis natalibus, secundum systema sexuale digestas. Vol. 1. Stockholm: Impensis Laurentii Salvii. pp. 308–309., see also Species Plantarum
- Tutin, T. G.; Heywood, V H; Burges, N. A.; Moore, D. M.; Valentine, D. H.; Walters, S. M.; Webb, D. A., eds. (1980). "Scilla amoena". Flora Europaea. Volume 5, Alismataceae to Orchidaceae (monocotyledones). Cambridge, England: Cambridge University Press. p. 42. ISBN 0-521-20108-X. (see also Flora Europaea)
- POWO (2022). "Scilla amoena L." Plants of the World Online. Royal Botanic Gardens, Kew.
- Meyer, Thomas (2022). "Schöner Blaustern". Flora von Deutschland.(image)

== See also ==
- List of Scilla species
