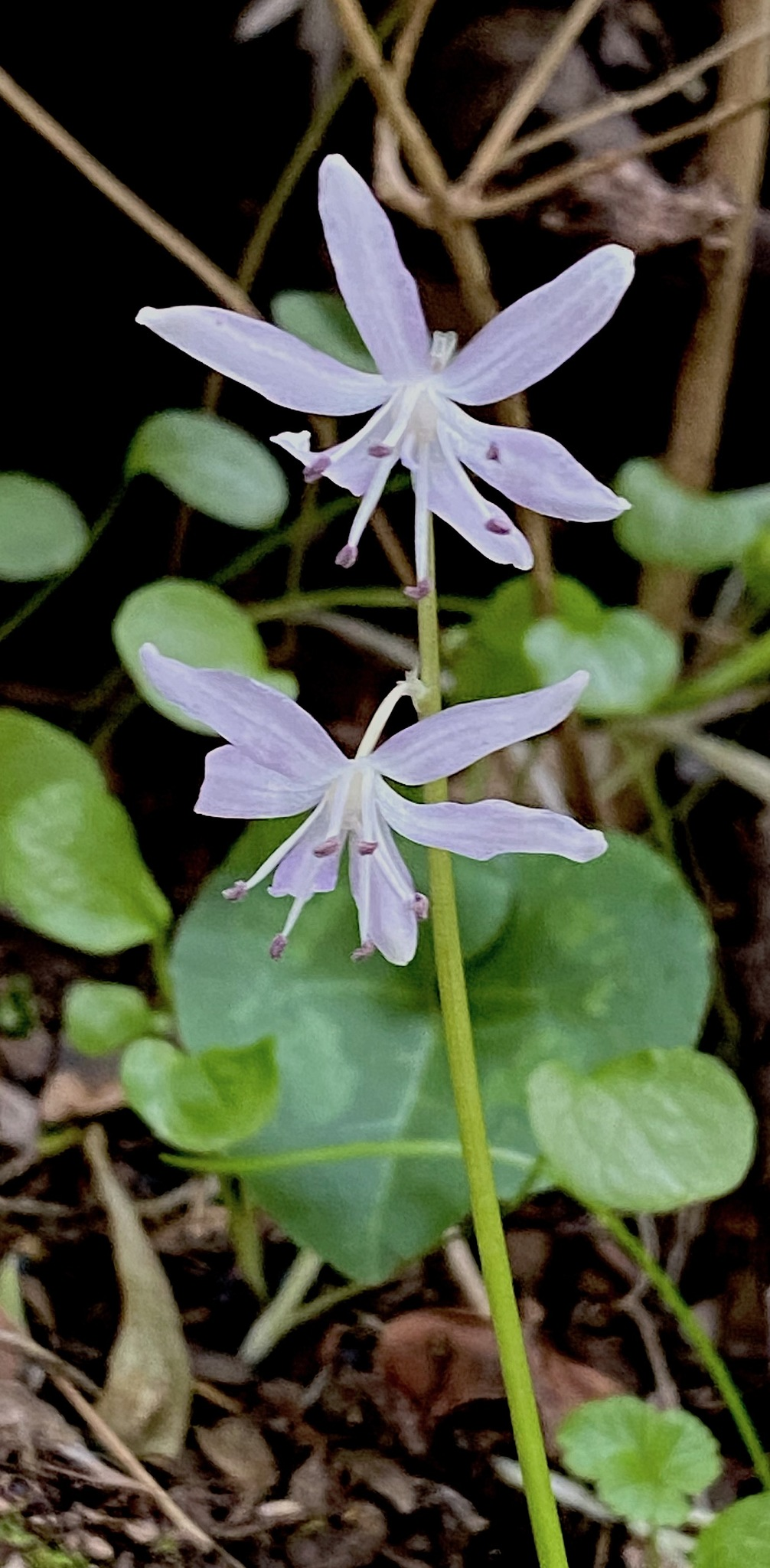

Conservation status
- Endangered (IUCN 3.1)

Scientific classification
- Kingdom: Plantae
- Clade: Tracheophytes
- Clade: Angiosperms
- Clade: Monocots
- Order: Asparagales
- Family: Asparagaceae
- Subfamily: Scilloideae
- Genus: Scilla
- Species: S. morrisii

Binomial name
- Scilla morrisii Meikle

Synonyms
- Othocallis morrisii (Meikle) Speta

= Scilla morrisii =

Species of flowering plant

Scilla morrisii, commonly known as the Morris squill or pallid squill, is a critically endangered species of plant in the family Asparagaceae. It is endemic to Mediterranean-type shrubby vegetation on the island of Cyprus.

== Description ==
The Morris squill is a perennial herb that grows up to 35 cm tall. It has 3-6 thick, straight leaves measuring up to 70 cm long and 0.5 to 1.5 cm wide. The flowers are star-shaped, small and usually coloured purple, blue or white. The flowering period is between March and April.

As a perennial, it overwinters as a bulb which stores nutrients. Like all species in this genus it is somewhat toxic.

== Distribution and habitat ==
The species is endemic to the north-western part of Cyprus and known from only three locations (two near the village of Panagia and one is near the Aghios Neophytos monastery). It appears to prefer an altitude of 250–900 m, where it grows in moist crevices, frequently under old oaks and terebinths.

== Conservation ==
The Morris squill is classified as Critically Endangered by the IUCN due to its very restricted distribution and the low number of individuals (an estimated 600 plants in 2006). All known plants are confined to an area of less than 2 km^{2}. The species is heavily dependent on old stands of oak trees, which are rapidly being reduced by logging, road construction and farmland conversion.

== See also ==
- List of Scilla species
