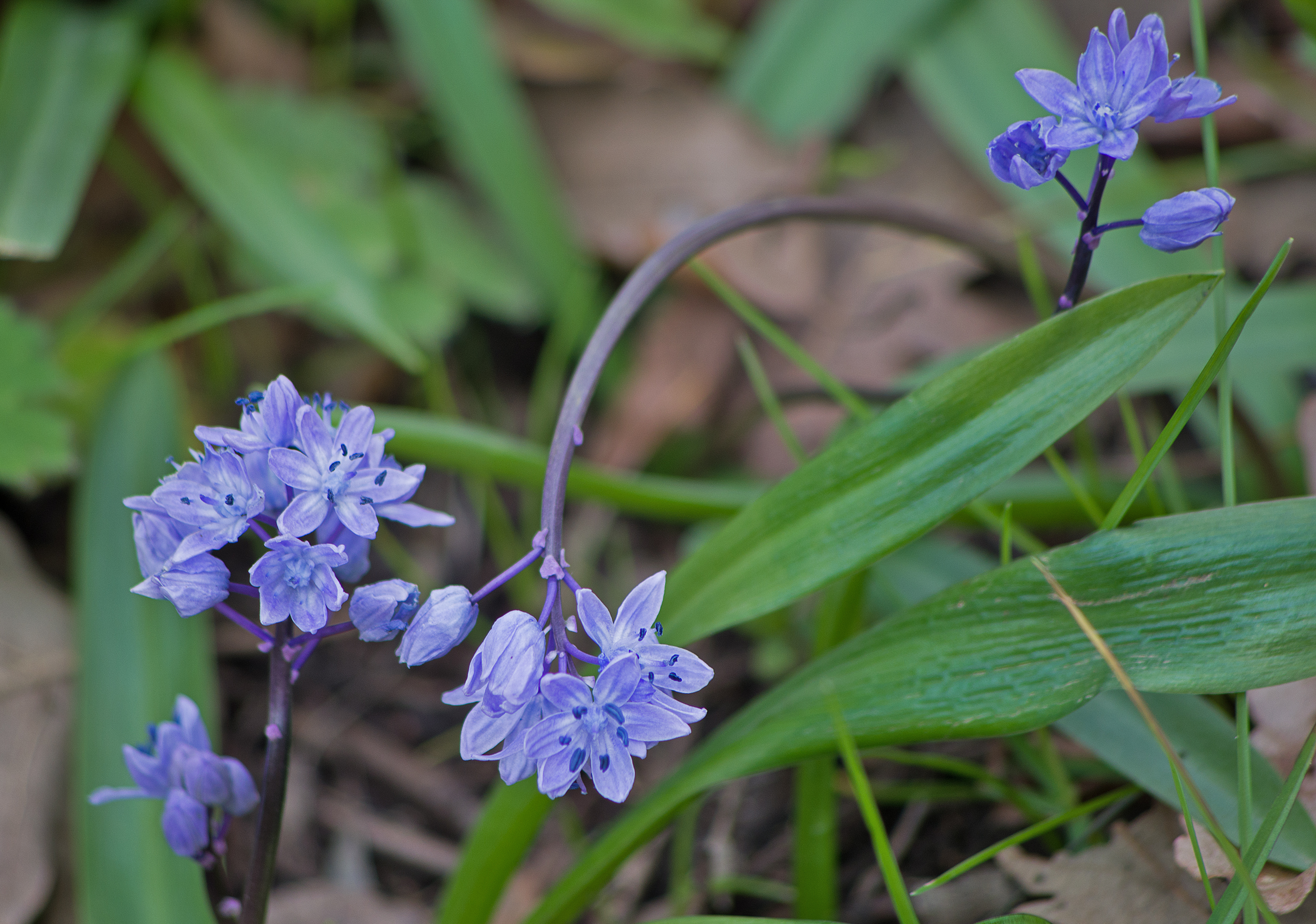
- In bloom in late March in Bulgaria

Scientific classification
- Kingdom: Plantae
- Clade: Embryophytes
- Clade: Tracheophytes
- Clade: Spermatophytes
- Clade: Angiosperms
- Clade: Monocots
- Order: Asparagales
- Family: Asparagaceae
- Subfamily: Scilloideae
- Genus: Scilla
- Species: S. bithynica

Binomial name
- Scilla bithynica Boiss.

Synonyms
- List: Pfosseria bithynica (Boiss.) Speta; Scilla bithynica subsp. linea Speta; Scilla bithynica subsp. paphlagonica Speta; Scilla bithynica subsp. radkae (Davidov) Speta; Scilla radkae Davidov

= Scilla bithynica =

Species of flowering plant

Scilla bithynica, the Turkish squill, is a species of flowering plant in the genus Scilla, native to Bulgaria and Turkey. It has gained the Royal Horticultural Society's Award of Garden Merit.

== See also ==
- List of Scilla species
