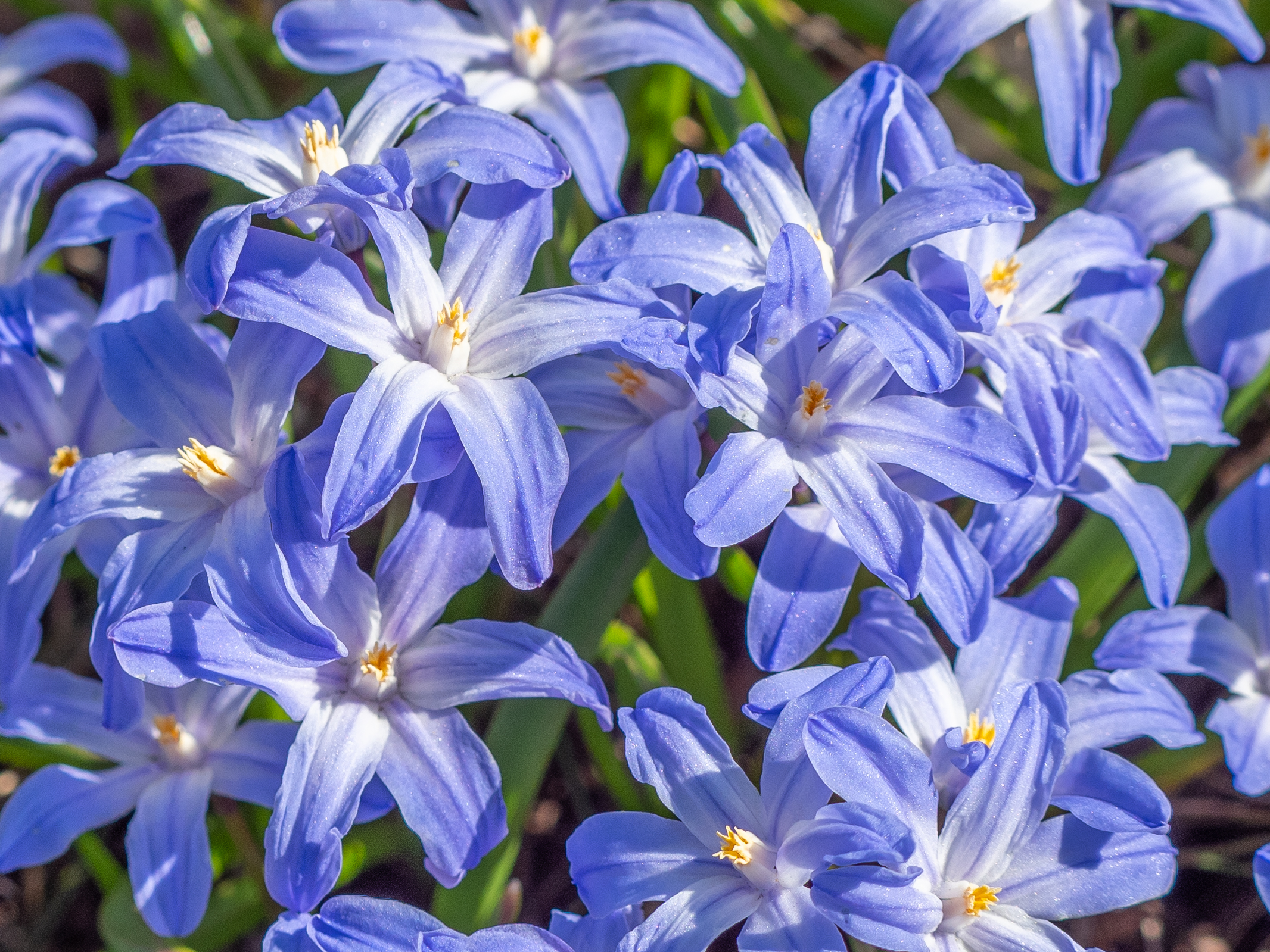

Scientific classification
- Kingdom: Plantae
- Clade: Embryophytes
- Clade: Tracheophytes
- Clade: Angiosperms
- Clade: Monocots
- Order: Asparagales
- Family: Asparagaceae
- Subfamily: Scilloideae
- Genus: Scilla
- Section: Scilla sect. Chionodoxa
- Species: S. luciliae

Binomial name
- Scilla luciliae (Boiss.) Speta

Synonyms
- Chionodoxa luciliae Boiss.; Chionodoxa gigantea Whittall; Chionodoxa grandiflora Wore ex Wilks & Weather

= Scilla luciliae =

Species of flowering plant

Scilla luciliae is a species of flowering plant in the family Asparagaceae. It is referred to by the common names Bossier's glory-of-the-snow or Lucile's glory-of-the-snow, and is a bulbous perennial from western Turkey that flowers in early spring. After flowering, it goes into dormancy until the next spring. The specific epithet is in honour of Lucile, the wife of the Swiss botanist Pierre Edmond Boissier (1810–1885). It belongs to a group of Scilla species that were formerly put in a separate genus, Chionodoxa, and may now be treated as Scilla sect. Chionodoxa.

== Description ==
It is a low-maintenance naturalizer that can grow in zones 3 to 8. Its blossom has a white center with lilac blue to violet blue petals. Like all members of the former genus Chionodoxa, the bases of the stamens are flattened and closely clustered in the middle of the flower.

In other species of Scilla, the stamens are not flattened or clustered together.

Each bulb produces two leaves, up to 8 cm long and 2 cm wide, and at most one flowering stem, up to 10 cm (3.9 in) long. The flowers are produced in a loose pyramidal raceme, with 2–3 flowers per stem, which face upwards. Each flower is up to 3.5 cm across. The base of each tepal is white (as are the stamen filaments), producing a white 'eye'. The outer part of the tepals is violet-blue. The species can be distinguished from the commonest species grown in gardens, S. forbesii, by the much smaller number of slightly larger flowers per stem.

It is a spring ephemeral as it disappears after blooming until the following spring, according to the Missouri Botanical Garden (MBG).

== Taxonomy ==
Swiss botanist Pierre Edmond Boissier (1810–1885) first described Chionodoxa luciliae Boiss. in 1844 in the Diagnoses Plantarum Orientalium novarum. He named the flower that blooms in the snow, Chionodoxa, which is from the Greek chion meaning snow and doxa for glory. Its specific epithet and common name in English – Lucile's glory-of-the-snow – is named after his wife. It is also called Bossier's glory-of-the-snow.

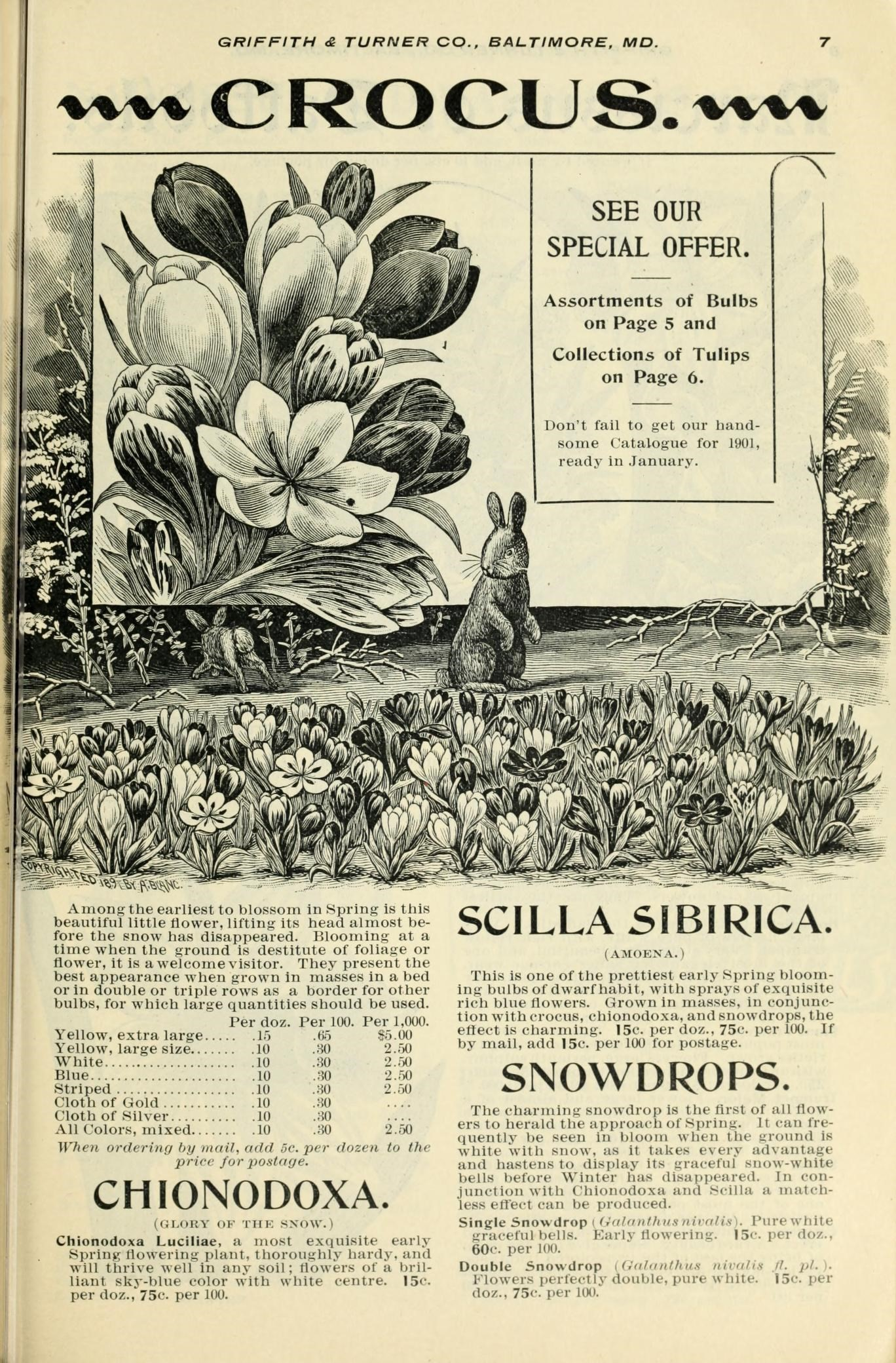
In 1900 catalogue

By 1900, Chionodoxa luciliae was advertised in the Baltimore, Maryland-based Griffith and Turner seed catalogue, along with snowdrops and Scilla siberica as early spring bulbs.

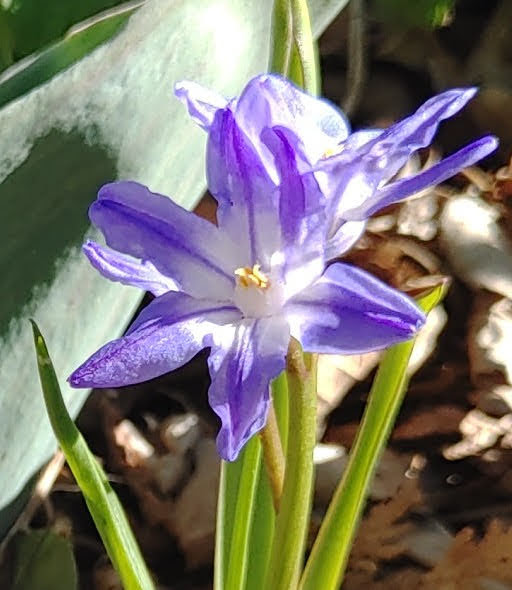
Flower

Following a molecular and morphological analysis to establish its taxonomy, the genus Chionodoxa was sunk into the genus Scilla. There was not enough difference between the two to merit a separate genus. It is now designated as a section of Scilla — Scilla sect. Chionodoxa. In 2009, Bohumil Trávníček and others proposed the division of the genus Scilla s.str. into two sections — one that comprised "all species of the S. bifolia group in the broader sense", and the second one sect. Chionodoxa containing taxa formerly in the genus Chionodoxa. In 2010, as part of a doctoral dissertation research, the taxonomy, ecology and reproduction of the genus Chionodoxa were investigated.

The World Checklist of Selected Plant Families (WCSP), which is maintained by the Royal Botanic Gardens, Kew, has accepted Scilla luciliae as a species name based on the 1971 journal article by Austrian botanist Franz Speta (1941–2015) in the Österreichische Botanische Zeitschrift.

By 2005, according to Dashwood and Matthew, there was some confusion about nomenclature within the then genus Chionodoxa. They cited examples of C. siehei that was merged with C. forbesii after being known for many years as C. luciliae incorrectly. They said that cultivated plants are usually variants of C. siehei, not the true species C. forbesii.

== Distribution ==
Scilla luciliae is native to western Turkey. It has a restricted distribution in the Mahmut Mountain in İzmir Province. Almost all species that are very frost-hardy belong to the Hyacinthaceae family and originate in the region of the Mediterranean from Turkey to Asia.

Scilla luciliae has naturalized in North America where the name used in concept references was chionodoxa luciliae and the common names were listed as Lucile's Squill and Scille gloire-des-neiges in French, according to the not-for-profit NatureServe Explorer, North America's "largest online encyclopedia of biodiversity".

== Cultivation ==
A number of frost-hardy plants in the genera Scilla, Chionodoxa, Hyacinthoides, Muscari, Puschkinia, Brimeura, Hyacinthella, Bellevalia, Hyacinthus and Ornithogalum were listed as deserving of the Award of Garden Merit by the Royal Horticultural Society. To receive this award, plants must provide decorative excellence; be easily acquired; be hardy, and not require a specialist; they must be pest- and disease-resistant, and not likely to be subject to reversion. In 1993 Chionodoxa luciliae was listed as having its Award of Garden Merit reconfirmed. Plants in the trial were acquired from the United Kingdom, Denmark and the Netherlands. Scilla luciliae had its Award of Garden Merit confirmed again in 2017.

== See also ==
- List of Scilla species

== Bibliography ==
- Boissier, Pierre Edmond (1844), "Chionodoxa luciliae", Diagnoses Plantarum Orientalium novarum, no. 5, Leipzig
- Dashwood, Melanie & Mathew, Brian (2005), Hyacinthaceae – little blue bulbs (RHS Plant Trials and Awards, Bulletin Number 11), Royal Horticultural Society, archived from the original on 28 August 2015
- David, J. (2018). "Why are we losing Chionodoxa?". Plantsman. 17 (1): 26–27. ISSN 1352-4186.
- Flora of North America Editorial Committee (2002). Magnoliophyta: Liliidae: Liliales and Orchidales. Flora of North America North of Mexico. Vol. 26. New York: Oxford University Press. p. 723.
- Kartesz, J.T. (1994). A synonymized checklist of the vascular flora of the United States, Canada, and Greenland (2 ed.). Portland, Oregon: Timber Press.
- Hsu, Eric (30 March 2019). "The little blue bulbs: part II". Plinth et al.
- Mathew, Brian (1987). The Smaller Bulbs. London: B T Batsford. ISBN 978-0-7134-4922-8.
- Mathew, Brian (2005). "Hardy Hyacinthaceae, Part 2: Scilla, Chionodoxa, xChionoscilla". The Plantsman. New Series. 4 (2): 110–21.
- Missouri Botanical Garden (n.d.). "Chionodoxa luciliae". Plant Finder.
- NatureServe (29 April 2022). "Chionodoxa luciliae".
- ONHIC (2018), Chionodoxa luciliae, Ontario Natural Heritage Information Centre (ONHIC), Ministry of Natural Resources, Ontario, Canada
- Plants of the World Online (n.d.). "Scilla luciliae (Boiss.) Speta". Plants of the World Online. The Trustees of the Royal Botanic Gardens, Kew.
- Royal Horticultural Society (n.d.), Scilla luciliae (Boiss.) Speta, RHS Plantfinder
- Royal Horticultural Society (July 2017), AGM Plants - Ornamental (PDF), p. 16
- Salmonson, Jessica Amanda (n.d.). "Paghat's garden by Paghat the Ratgirl". Archived from the original on August 18, 2003.
- Speta, Franz (1971). "Beitrag zur systematik von Scilla L. subgen. Scilla (inklusive Chionodoxa Boiss.)". Österreichische Botanische Zeitschrift. 119 (1–3): 6–18. doi:10.1007/BF01373105. ISSN 0029-8948. S2CID 26152307.
- Trávníček, Bohumil; Duchoslav, Martin; Šarhanová, Petra; Šafářová, Lenka (24 December 2009). "Squills (Scilla s.lat., Hyacinthaceae) in the flora of the Czech Republic, with taxonomical notes on Central-European squill populations". Acta Musei Moraviae, Scientiae Biologicae. 94. Brno, Czech Republic): 157–205.
- "Scilla luciliae (Boiss.) Speta". Plants of the World Online. Royal Botanic Gardens, Kew.
- Yildirim, H. (2010). The Taxonomy, Ecology and Reproduction of Genus Chionodoxa Boiss (Liliaceae) (Ph.D. dissertation). Kew: Ege University. p. 223.
- Yildirim, H.; Yetisen, K.; Özdemir, A. & Özdemir, C. (2017). "An Anatomical Study of Scilla (Scilloideae) Section Chionodoxa and Scilla bifolia in Turkey" (PDF). Planta Daninha. 35: e017162495. doi:10.1590/s0100-83582017350100004.
