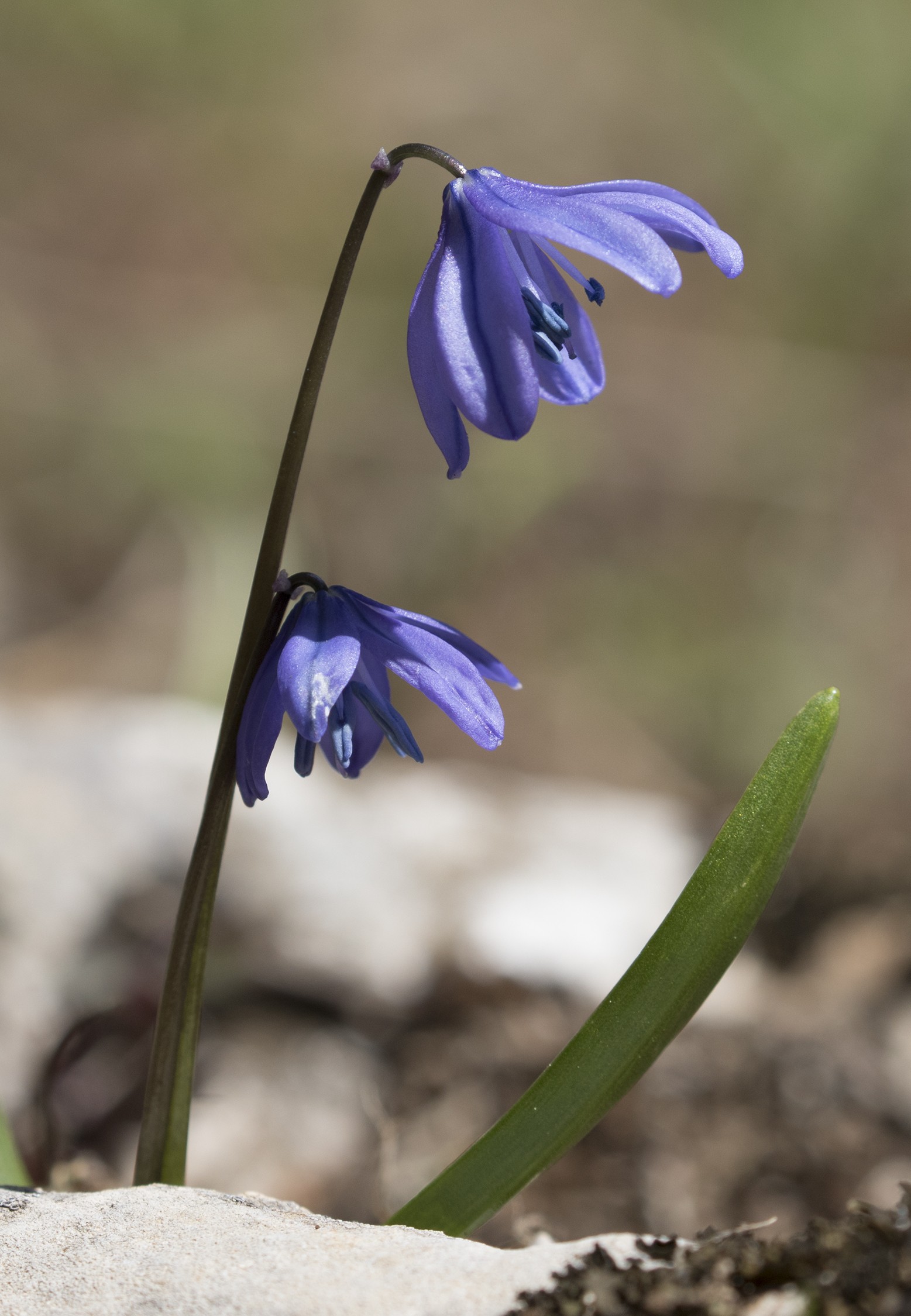

Scientific classification
- Kingdom: Plantae
- Clade: Tracheophytes
- Clade: Angiosperms
- Clade: Monocots
- Order: Asparagales
- Family: Asparagaceae
- Subfamily: Scilloideae
- Genus: Scilla
- Species: S. cilicica

Binomial name
- Scilla cilicica Siehe (1908)

= Scilla cilicica =

Species of flowering plant

Scilla cilicica is a species of flowering plant in the genus Scilla, native to Cyprus, Lebanon, Syria, Palestine, Turkey, and Israel. It is a perennial growing to a height of 50cm, with a similar width, flowering from February to March with violet-purple flowers.
