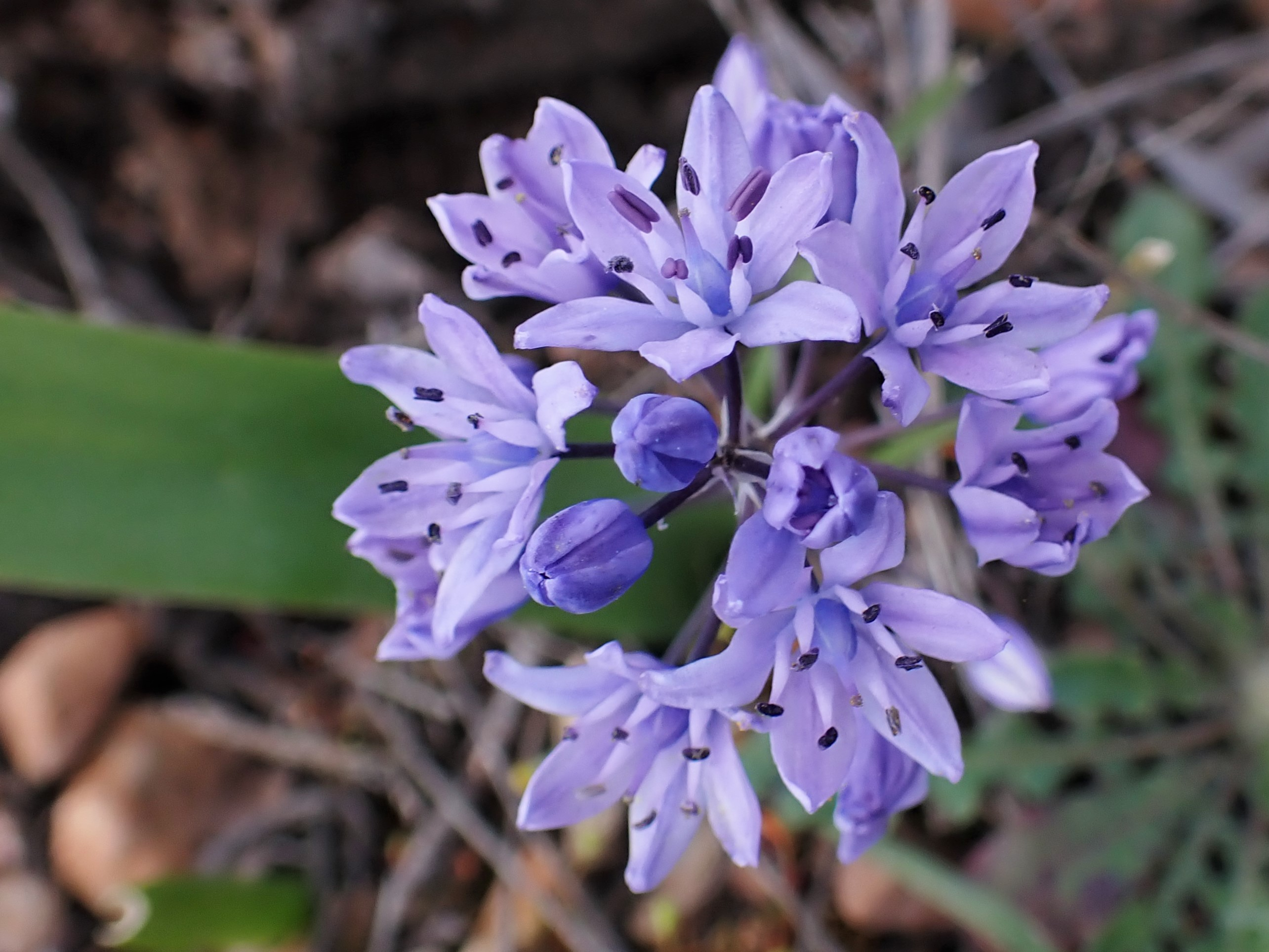
- Inflorescence
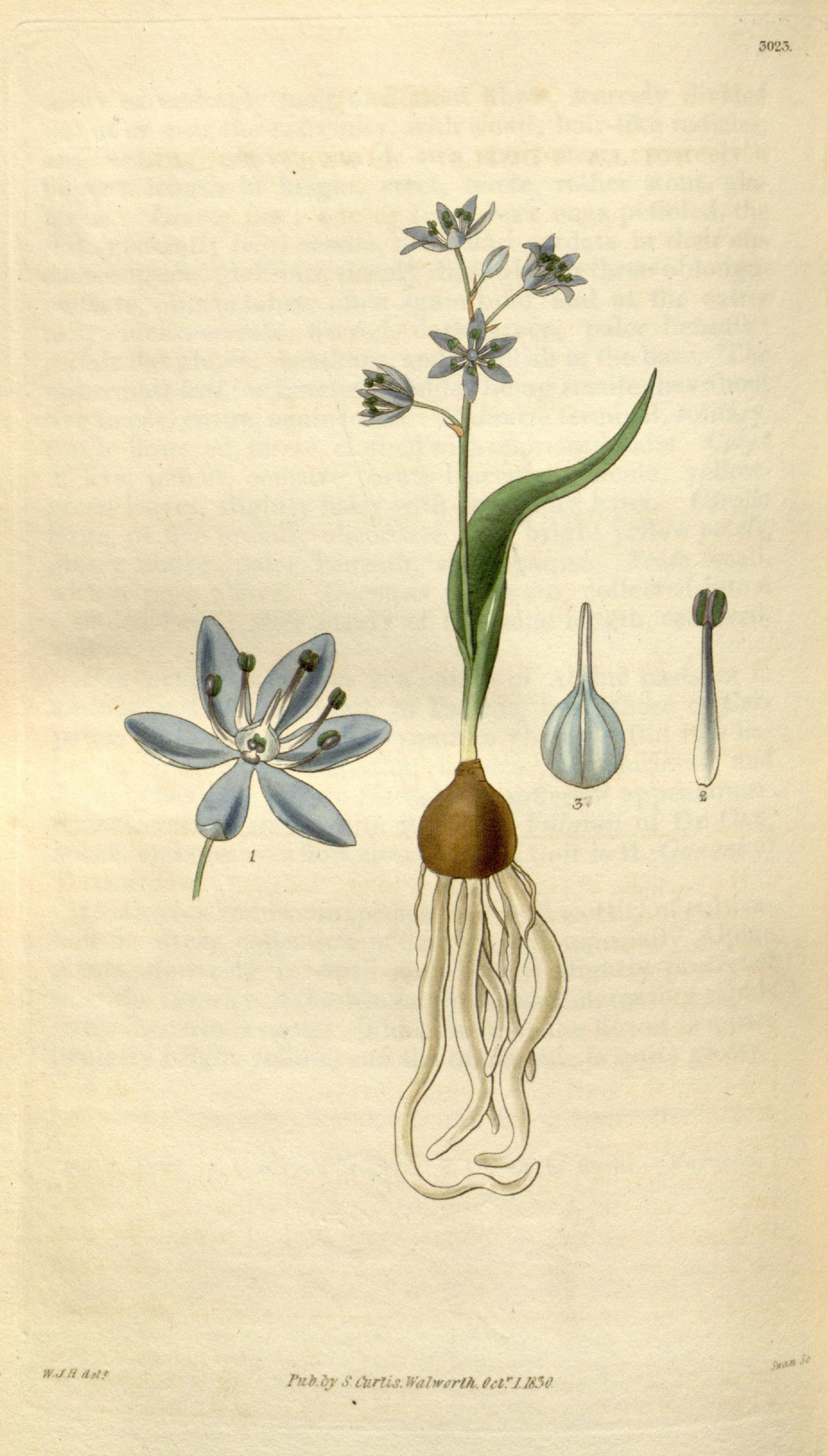
- Botanical illustration

Scientific classification
- Kingdom: Plantae
- Clade: Tracheophytes
- Clade: Angiosperms
- Clade: Monocots
- Order: Asparagales
- Family: Asparagaceae
- Subfamily: Scilloideae
- Genus: Scilla
- Species: S. monophyllos

Binomial name
- Scilla monophyllos Link

Synonyms
- List: Monocallis monophylla (Link) Salisb.; Oncostema monophyllos (Link) Speta; Oncostema tingitana (Schousb.) Speta; Scilla monophyllos f. albiflora Merino; Scilla monophyllos f. maculata Rivas Mateos; Scilla monophyllos var. pumila (Brot.) Maire & Weiller; Scilla monophyllos var. tingitana (Schousb.) Pau; Scilla pumila Brot.; Scilla tingitana Schousb.; Tractema monophyllos (Link) Speta; Tractema pumila (Brot.) Raf.; Tractema tingitana (Schousb.) Speta

= Scilla monophyllos =

Species of plant

Scilla monophyllos, the single-leaved squill, is a species of flowering plant in the family Asparagaceae. It is native to Morocco, Portugal, and western Spain. As its scientific and common names suggest, it typically has only one leaf.

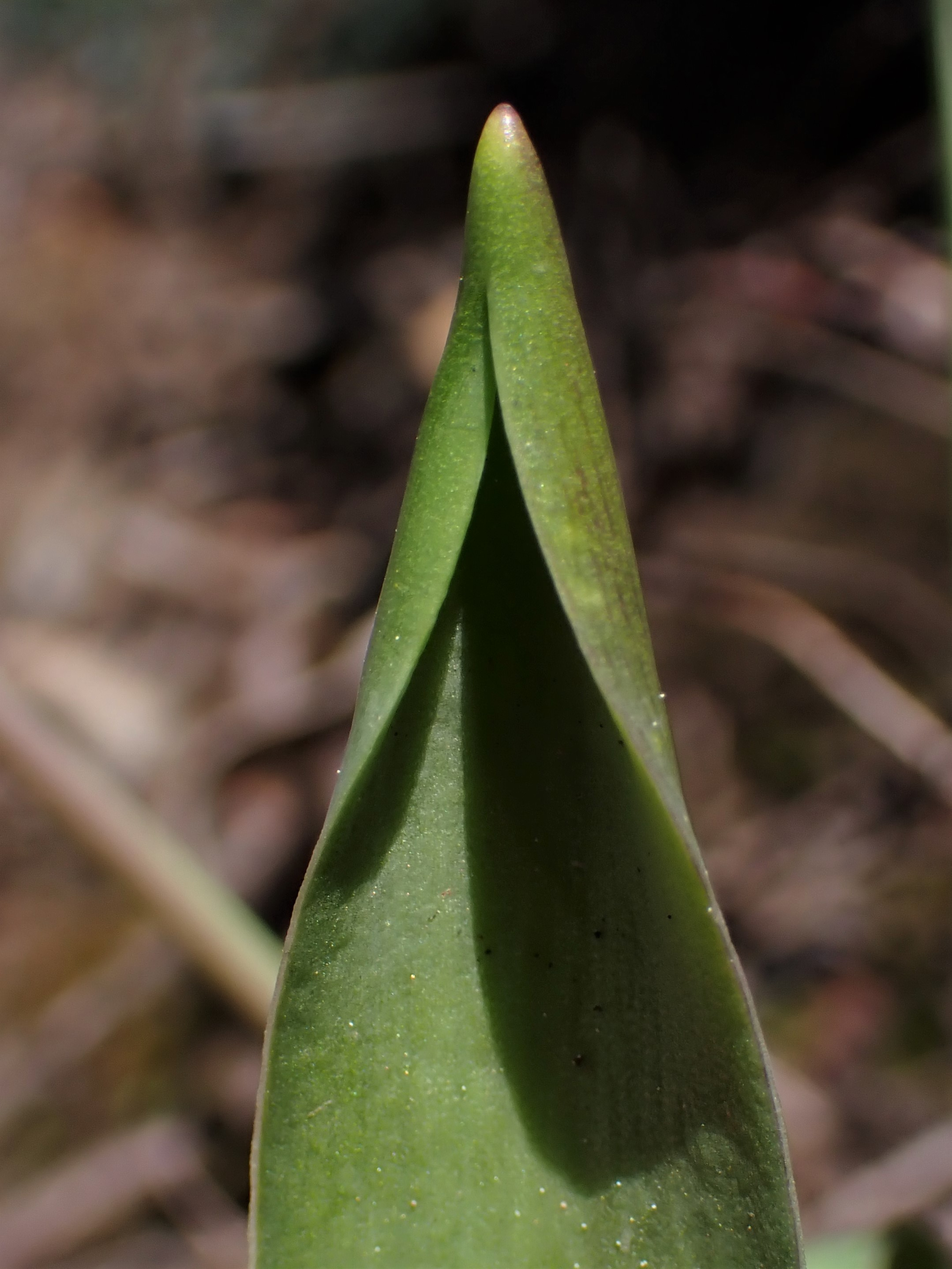
Emerging leaf tip

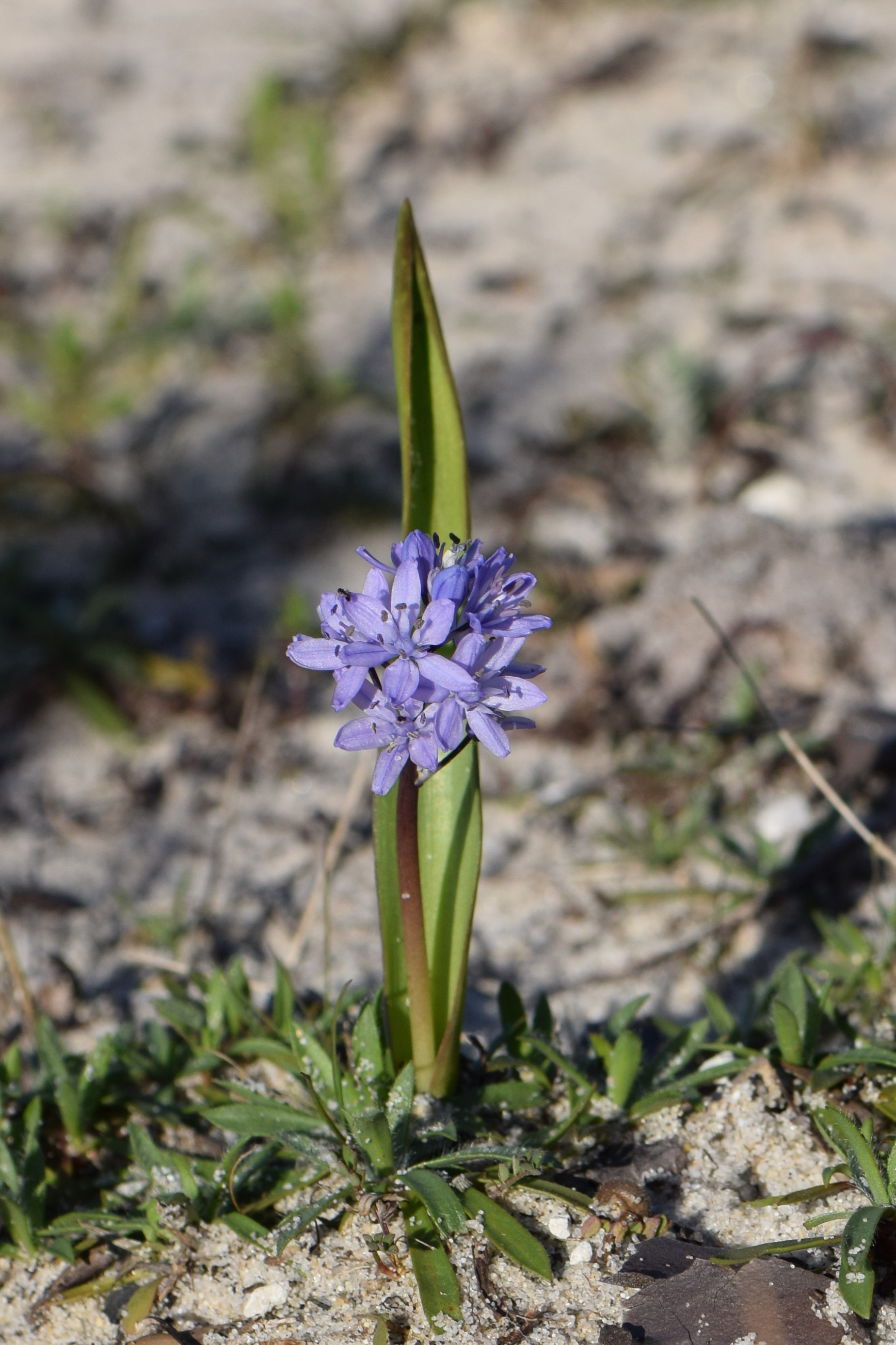
An individual

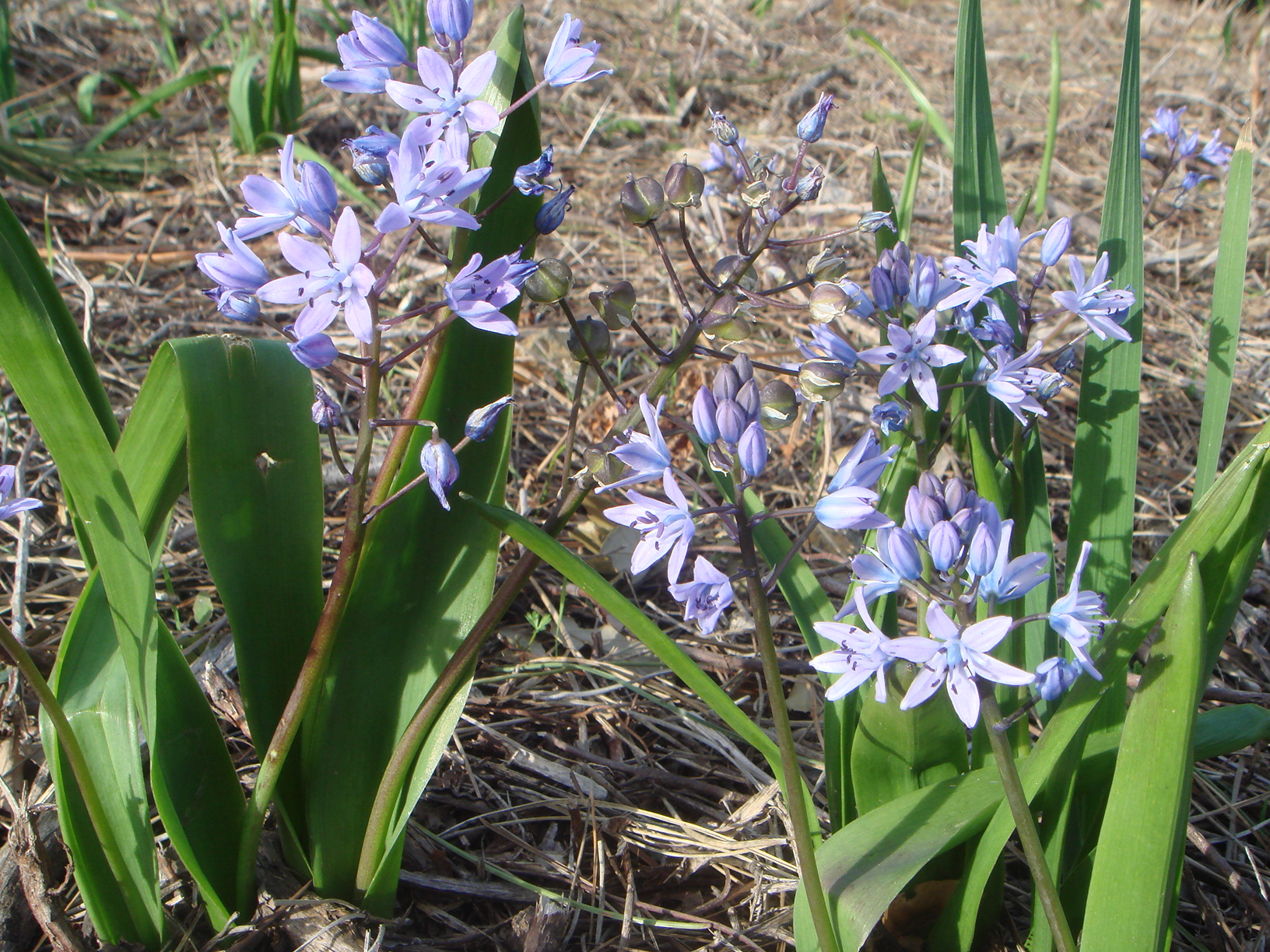
Clump

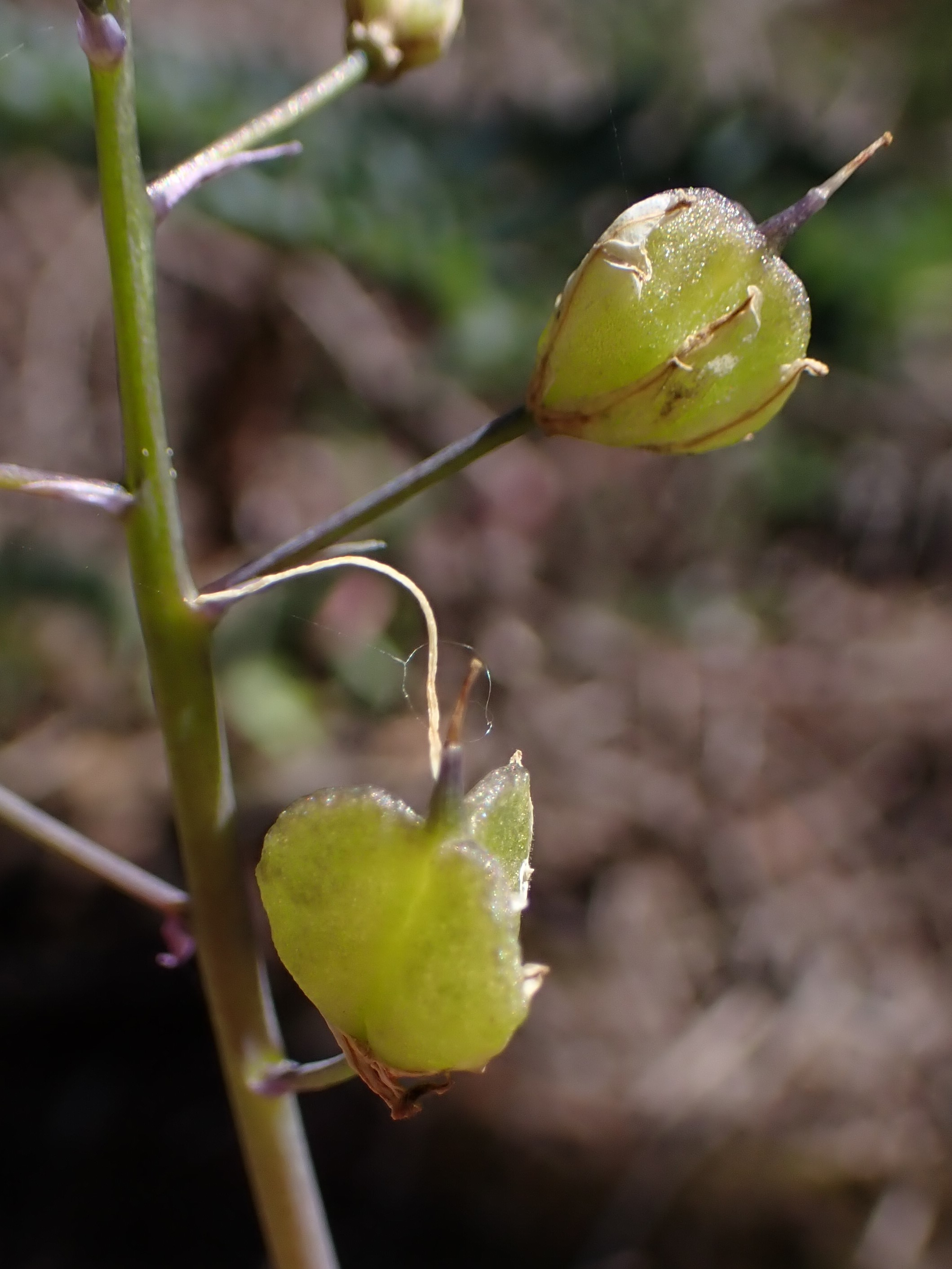
Fruit
