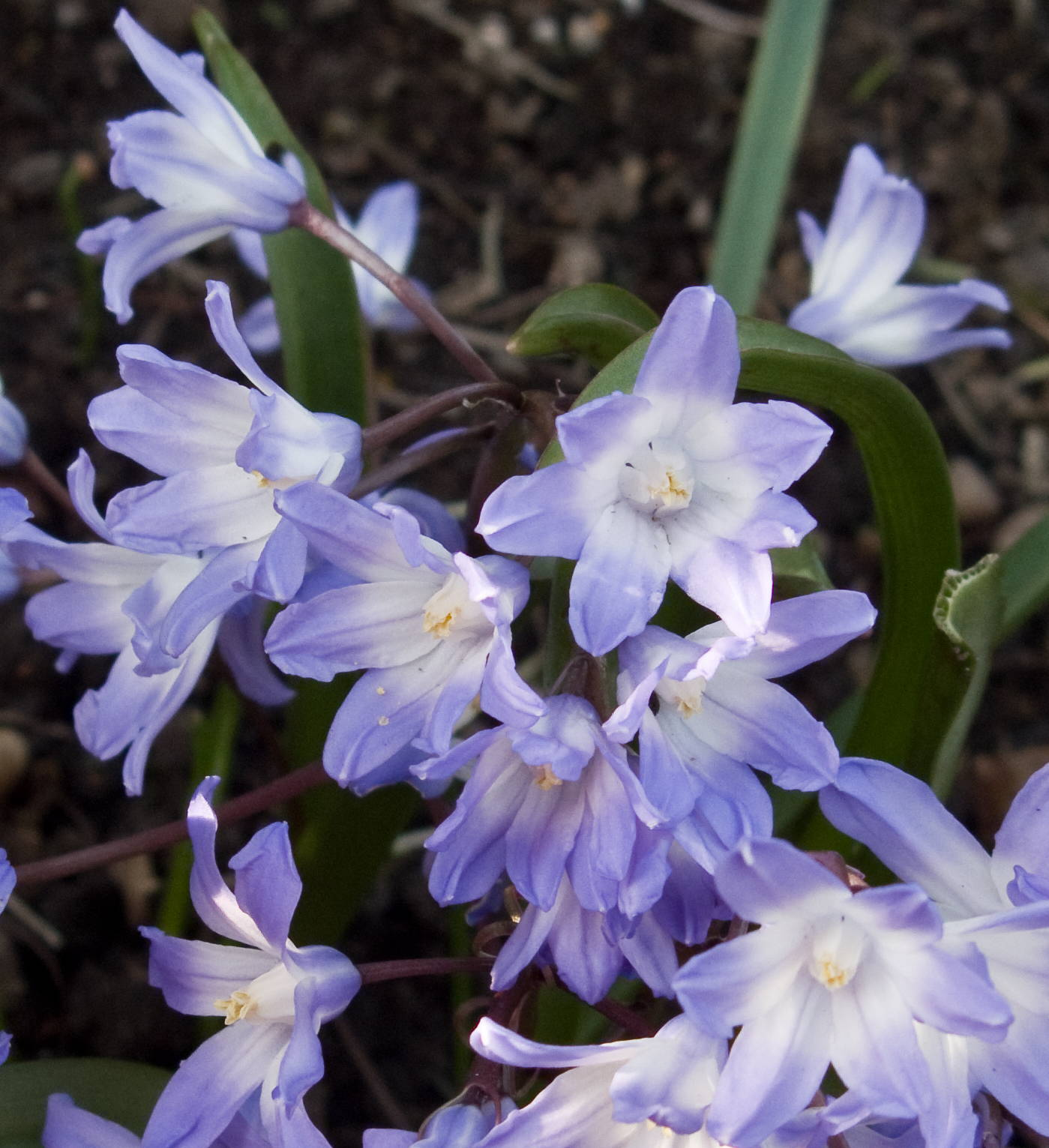

Scientific classification
- Kingdom: Plantae
- Clade: Tracheophytes
- Clade: Angiosperms
- Clade: Monocots
- Order: Asparagales
- Family: Asparagaceae
- Subfamily: Scilloideae
- Genus: Scilla
- Section: Scilla sect. Chionodoxa
- Species: S. forbesii

Binomial name
- Scilla forbesii (Baker) Speta

Synonyms
- Chionodoxa forbesii Baker; Chionodoxa luciliae var. forbesii (Baker) Drude; Chionodoxa siehei Stapf; Chionodoxa tmolusi Whittall; Scilla siehei (Stapf) Speta; Scilla tmolusi (Whittall) Speta

= Scilla forbesii =

Species of plant

Scilla forbesii, known as Forbes' glory-of-the-snow, is a bulbous perennial plant from west Turkey flowering in early spring. It is considered synonymous with Scilla siehei, known as Siehe's glory-of-the-snow, by some sources, although others distinguish them. It belongs to a group of Scilla species that were formerly put in a separate genus, Chionodoxa, and may now be treated as Scilla sect. Chionodoxa. After flowering, it goes into dormancy until the next spring. It seeds readily to form colonies.

== Description ==
Like all members of the former genus Chionodoxa, the bases of the stamens are flattened and closely clustered in the middle of the flower. In other species of Scilla, the stamens are not flattened or clustered together.

Each bulb produces two leaves, up to 12 cm long and 2 cm wide, and at most one flowering stem, up to 10.5 cm long. The flowers are produced in a broadly pyramidal raceme, with up to 12 flowers per stem. The lower ones face outwards, the upper ones face upward. Each flower is up to 3 cm across, with individual tepals 1.3 cm long. The base of each tepal is white (as are the stamen filaments), producing a white 'eye'. The outer part of the tepals is deep blue to violet-blue.

For those who differentiate S. siehei from S. forbesii, S. forbesii differs by having fewer, smaller upward-facing flowers, which are a deep blue, rather than violet-blue.

Growth stages

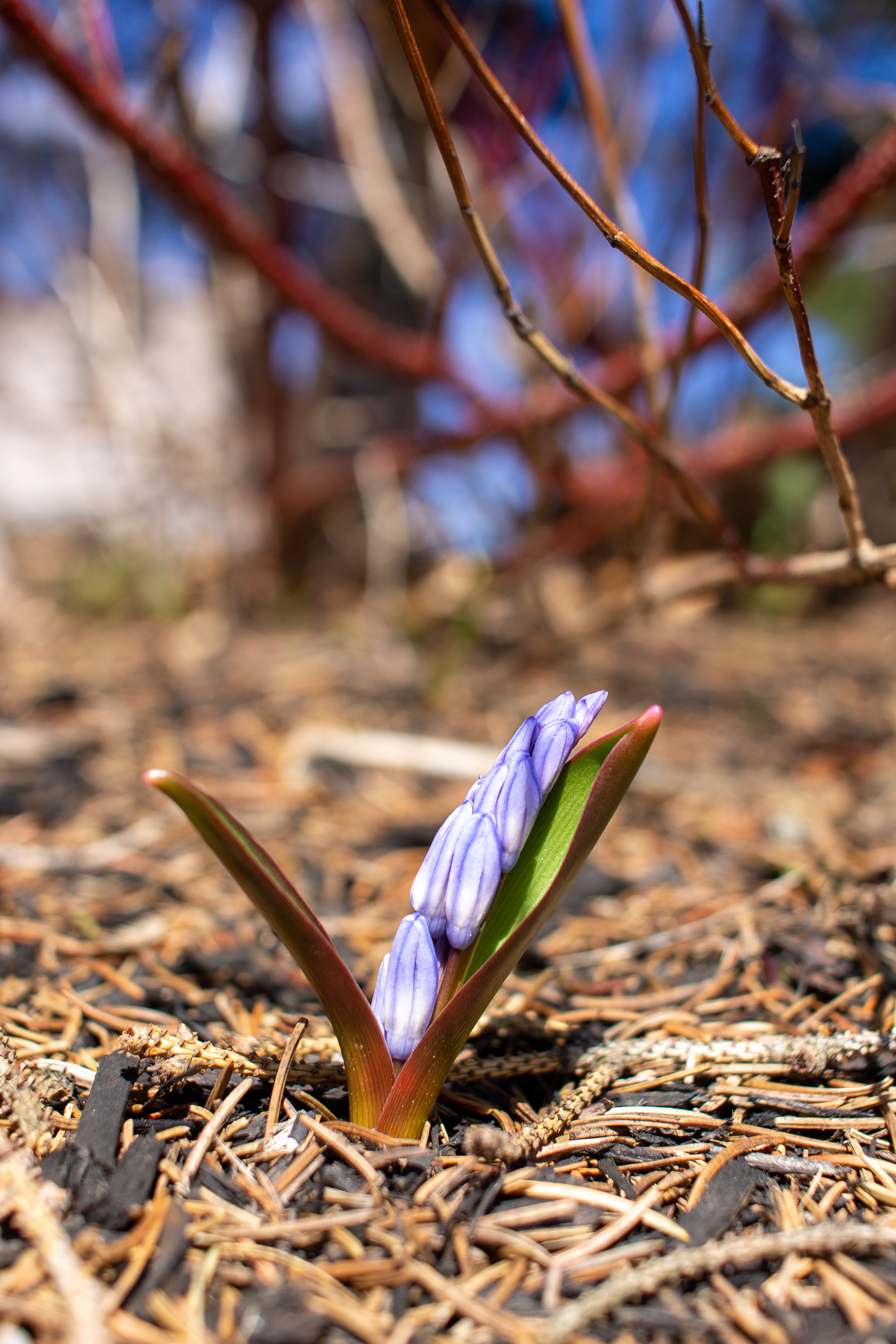

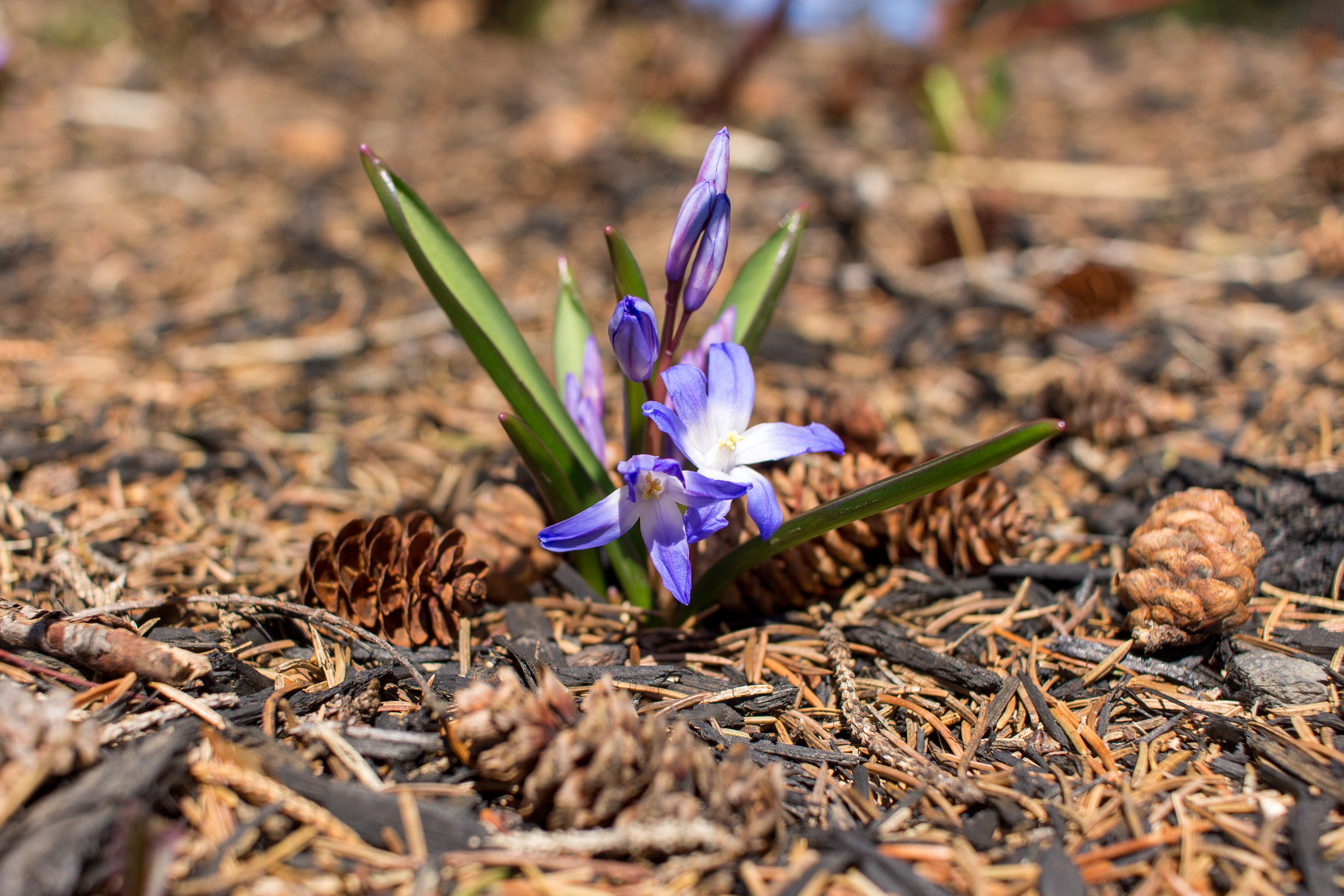

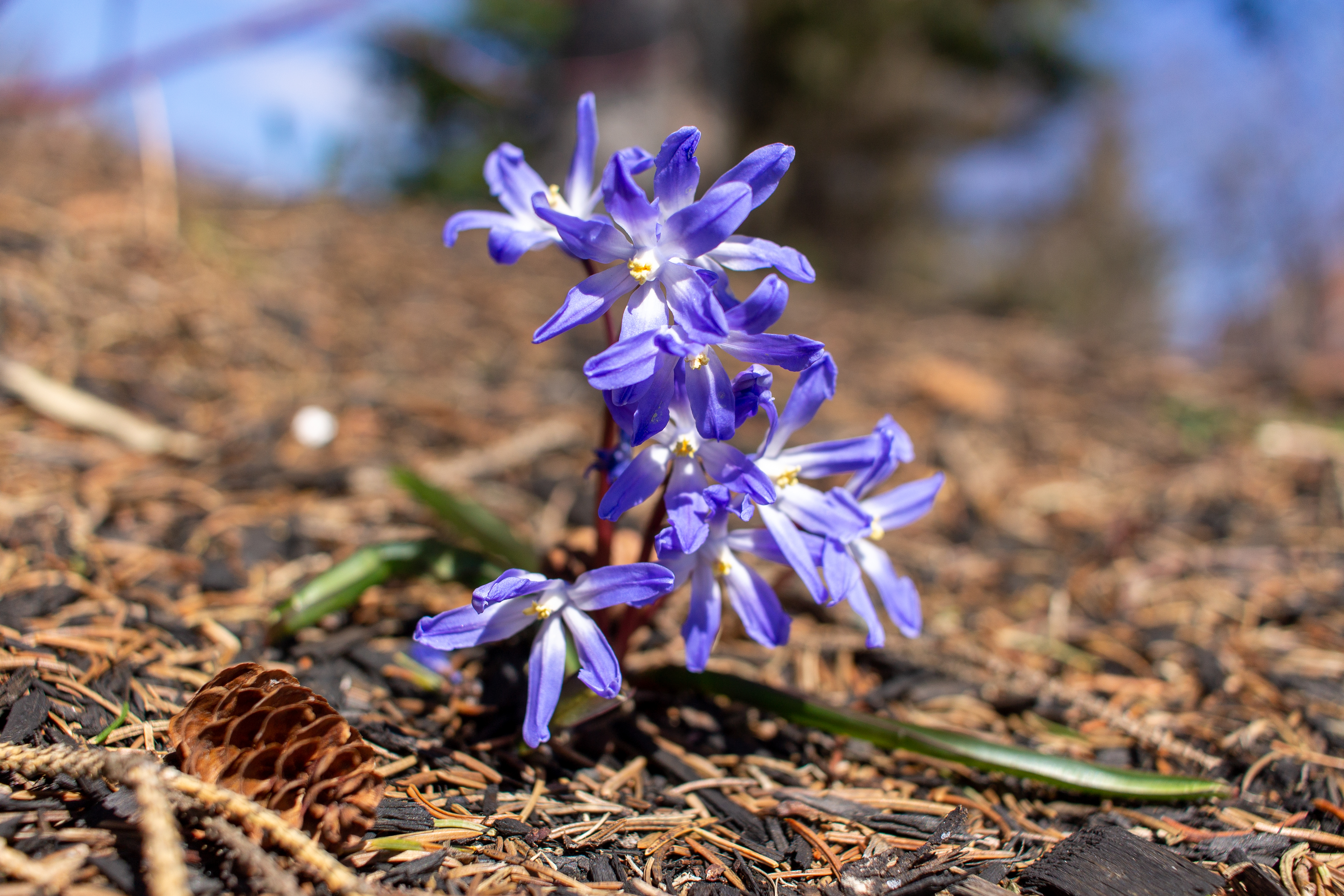

== Distribution ==
Scilla forbesii, taken to include S. siehei, is native to western and southern Turkey. Yildirim et al., who distinguish between S. forbesii and S. siehei, give the two slightly different distributions within Turkey. S. forbesii is said to occur only on Babadağ Mountain in Muğla Province, whereas S. siehei is found only on Nif Mountain in İzmir Province.

== Cultivation ==
Scilla forbesii is the commonest species grown in gardens, where it is often wrongly called S. luciliae.

Scilla forbesii can be bought as dry bulbs (often under the alternative names Scilla luciliae, Chionodoxa luciliae, Scilla siehei or Chionodoxa siehei) and planted while dormant in late summer or early autumn at a depth of 8–10 cm. It requires light when in growth, but can be grown under deciduous trees or shrubs, as the foliage dies down after flowering. It will flower in early to mid Spring. The common blue form seeds freely in many gardens, creating large colonies.

Scilla siehei, then regarded as a separate species, was awarded the RHS Award of Garden Merit in 1993, which was reconfirmed in 2005. The variety alba has white flowers, and the cultivar 'Pink Giant' has pink flowers with white centres.

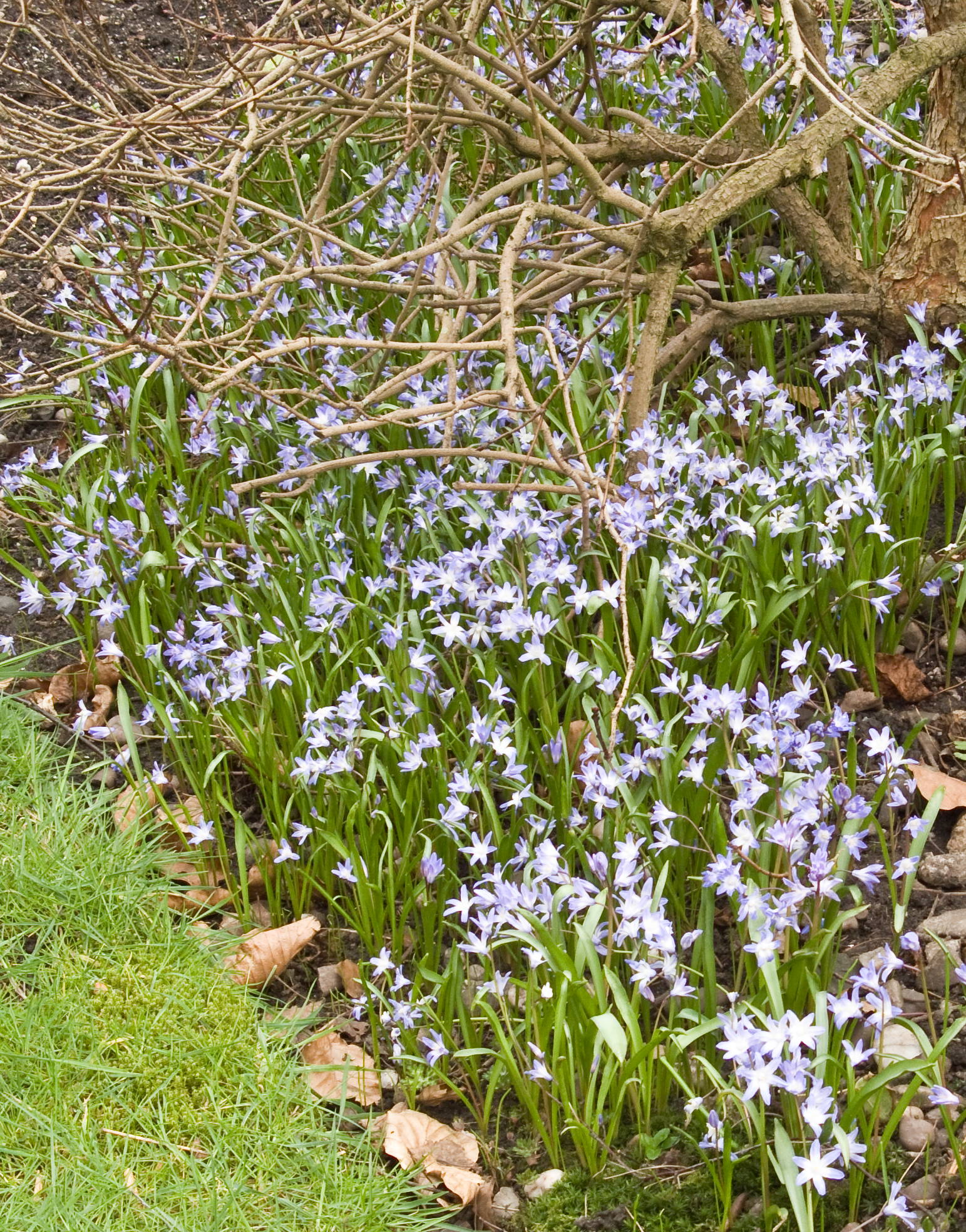
Self-sown carpet under a deciduous shrub, flowering in early April in the West Midlands, England

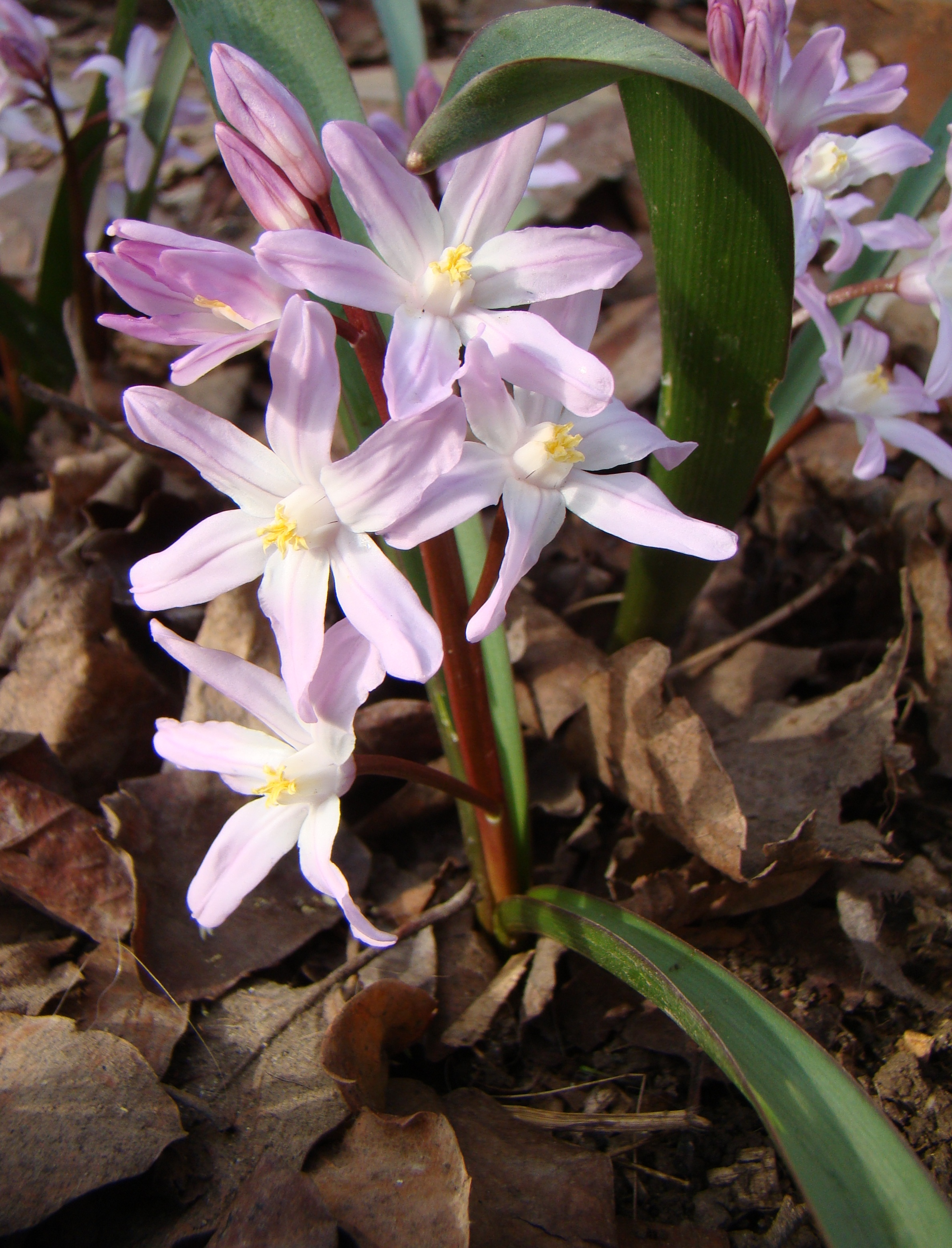
'Pink Giant'

== Bibliography ==
- Beckett, Kenneth; Grey-Wilson, Christopher, eds. (1993), "Chionodoxa", Alpine Garden Society Encyclopaedia of Alpines, Vol. 1 (A-K), Pershore, UK: AGS Publications, pp. 284–285, ISBN 978-0-900048-63-0
- Dashwood, Melanie & Mathew, Brian (2005), Hyacinthaceae – little blue bulbs (RHS Plant Trials and Awards, Bulletin Number 11), Royal Horticultural Society, archived from the original on 28 August 2015
- Mathew, Brian (1987), The Smaller Bulbs, London: B T Batsford, ISBN 978-0-7134-4922-8
- Mathew, Brian (2005), "Hardy Hyacinthaceae, Part 2: Scilla, Chionodoxa, xChionoscilla", The Plantsman, New Series, 4 (2): 110–121
- Yildirim, H.; Yetisen, K.; Özdemir, A. & Özdemir, C. (2017), "An Anatomical Study of Scilla (Scilloideae) Section Chionodoxa and Scilla bifolia in Turkey" (PDF), Planta Daninha, 35: e017162495, doi:10.1590/s0100-83582017350100004

== See also ==
- List of Scilla species
