= Hyacinthoides paivae =

Scientific classification
- Kingdom: Plantae
- Clade: Embryophytes
- Clade: Tracheophytes
- Clade: Spermatophytes
- Clade: Angiosperms
- Clade: Monocots
- Order: Asparagales
- Family: Asparagaceae
- Subfamily: Scilloideae
- Genus: Hyacinthoides
- Species: H. paivae

Binomial name
- Hyacinthoides paivae S. Ortiz & Rodr.-Oubiña

Species of flowering plant

Hyacinthoides paivae is a species of bluebell in the genus Hyacinthoides native to the north-western part of the Iberian Peninsula. It lives chiefly in shady woodlands, and grows up to 45 cm (18 in) tall, producing a cluster of up to 18 pale blue flowers in spring. It was formally described in 1996, having previously been identified as belonging to the related species H. italica.

== Description ==
Hyacinthoides paivae is a perennial plant which grows from bulbs that are typically 17–30 millimetres (0.67–1.18 in) × 13–30 mm (0.51–1.18 in). Each bulb produces 4–7 (more rarely 2–12) basal leaves, each 20–50 centimetres (7.9–19.7 in) long and 7–12 mm (0.28–0.47 in) wide. The stems are 22–45 cm (8.7–17.7 in) long, and bear an inflorescence comprising 6–18 flowers in a multilateral raceme. Each flower is attached by a pedicel 5–7 mm (0.20–0.28 in) long, and is itself 12–22 mm (0.47–0.87 in) long by 2–3 mm (0.08–0.12 in) wide. H. paivae can be told apart from H. italica by its broader leaves and larger flowers; H. hispanica differs in having longer, narrower, unscented and bell-shaped flowers.

== Distribution and ecology ==
Hyacinthoides paivae is endemic to the north-western part of the Iberian Peninsula, including western parts of Galicia (A Coruña, Ourense and Pontevedra provinces) and north-western parts of Portugal (Beira Litoral, Douro Litoral, Minho and Trás-os-Montes provinces). Material of an unidentified species from the Sierra de la Demanda, a small mountain range on the border between Burgos province and La Rioja, matches H. paivae genetically.

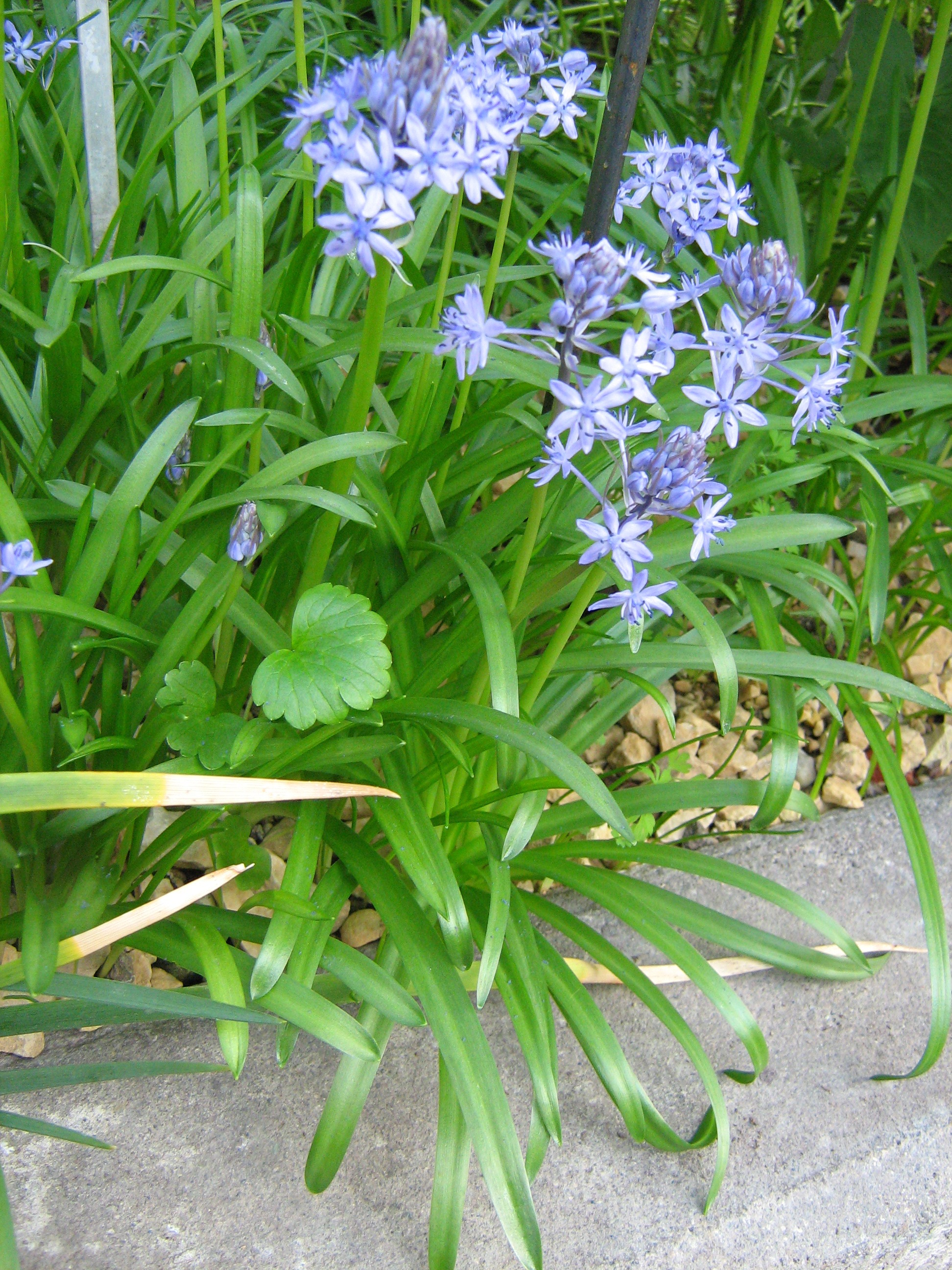
H.paivae was confused with this species, H. italica, seen growing at the Berne Botanical Gardens.

H. paivae occurs in oak woodland and pine woods growing over Ulex, Erica cinerea and Cistus spp., as well as other shady habitats. It also occurs occasionally on coastal cliffs, and in mown meadows. The typical flowering period is March and April, although it can be as late as June in upland areas, such as Monte Pindo.

== Taxonomic history ==
In 1990, bluebells assigned to the species Hyacinthoides italica were reported from north-western Spain. Later analyses of the species morphology demonstrated that the plants did not belong to H. italica, which is only otherwise found near the French–Italian border. Instead, it was realised that they represented a new species, which was named Hyacinthoides paivae by Santiago Ortiz and Juan Rodríguez-Oubiña in 1996, the specific epithet paivae honouring the Portuguese botanist Jorge Paiva.

The holotype, a specimen from Dumbría, A Coruña province, Spain, is held at the herbarium of the Universidad de Santiago de Compostela; isotypes are also kept there, and at the University of Coimbra, the Real Jardín Botánico and Universidad Complutense in Madrid, the Centro de Investigaciones Forestales y Ambientales de Lourizán in Pontevedra, and at the Natural History Museum and Royal Botanic Gardens, Kew in London.

Ortiz and Rodríguez-Oubiña initially placed the species in "Hyacinthoides sect. Somera", but more recent molecular phylogenetic analysis could not confirm any of the existing sections in the genus, and placed it instead in an informal group alongside H. non-scripta, H. hispanica and H. cedretorum.
