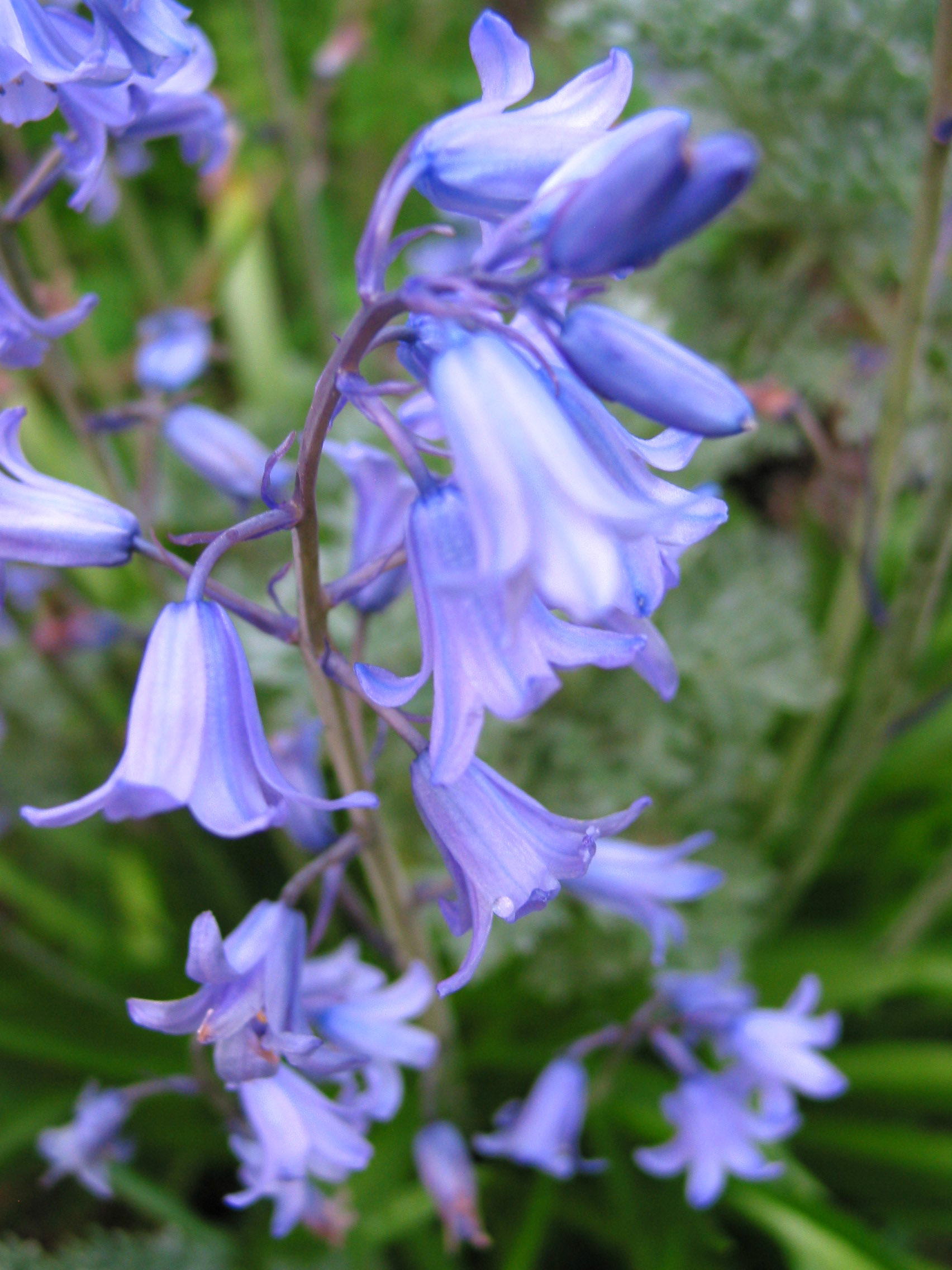
- Hyacinthoides × massartiana

Scientific classification
- Kingdom: Plantae
- Clade: Tracheophytes
- Clade: Angiosperms
- Clade: Monocots
- Order: Asparagales
- Family: Asparagaceae
- Subfamily: Scilloideae
- Genus: Hyacinthoides; Heist. ex P. C. Fabricius

Type species
- Hyacinthoides hispanica (Mill.) Rothm.

Synonyms
- Usteria Medik.; Hylomenes Salisb.; Hyacinthoides Medik.; Endymion Dumort.; Agraphis Link; Lagocodes Raf.; Somera Salisb.; Apsanthea Jord. in Jordan & Fourreau

= Hyacinthoides =

Genus of flowering plants

Hyacinthoides /ˌhaɪəsɪnˈθɔɪdiːz/ is a genus of flowering plants in the family Asparagaceae, known as bluebells.

== Systematics ==
Hyacinthoides is classified in the subfamily Scilloideae (now part of the family Asparagaceae, but formerly treated as a separate family, called Hyacinthaceae), alongside genera such as Scilla and Ornithogalum. Hyacinthoides is differentiated from these other genera by the presence of two bracts at the base of each flower, rather than one bract per flower or no bracts in the other genera.

=== Species ===
According to the World Checklist of Selected Plant Families as of July 2012, the genus contains 11 species and one interspecific hybrid. The majority of species are distributed around the Mediterranean Basin, with only one species, Hyacinthoides non-scripta (the familiar spring flower of bluebell woods in the British Isles and elsewhere) occurring further north in north-western Europe. Hyacinthoides species belong, according to analysis using molecular phylogenetics, to three groups.

non-scripta–hispanica group

- Hyacinthoides cedretorum (Pomel) Dobignard – Morocco to north Algeria
- Hyacinthoides hispanica (Mill.) Rothm. (Spanish bluebell) – Portugal to west and south Spain
- Hyacinthoides non-scripta (L.) Chouard ex Rothm. (common bluebell) – western Europe to northern Portugal
- Hyacinthoides paivae S.Ortiz & Rodr.Oubiña – north-west Spain to north-west Portugal
- Hyacinthoides × massartiana Geerinck – hybrid between H. hispanica and H. non-scripta, occurs in north-west Spain and elsewhere in Europe, including Great Britain

mauritanica group

- Hyacinthoides flahaultiana (Emb.) Dobignard – south-west Morocco
- Hyacinthoides mauritanica (Schousb.) Speta – south-west Portugal, north Morocco
- Hyacinthoides reverchonii (Degen & Hervier) Speta – Spain (Sierra de Cazorla)

italica group

- Hyacinthoides aristidis (Coss.) Rothm. – Algeria to Tunisia
- Hyacinthoides ciliolata (Pomel) Rumsey – north-east Tunisia
- Hyacinthoides italica (L.) Rothm. (Italian bluebell) – south-east France to north-west Italy
- Hyacinthoides lingulata (Poir.) Rothm. – north-west Africa
