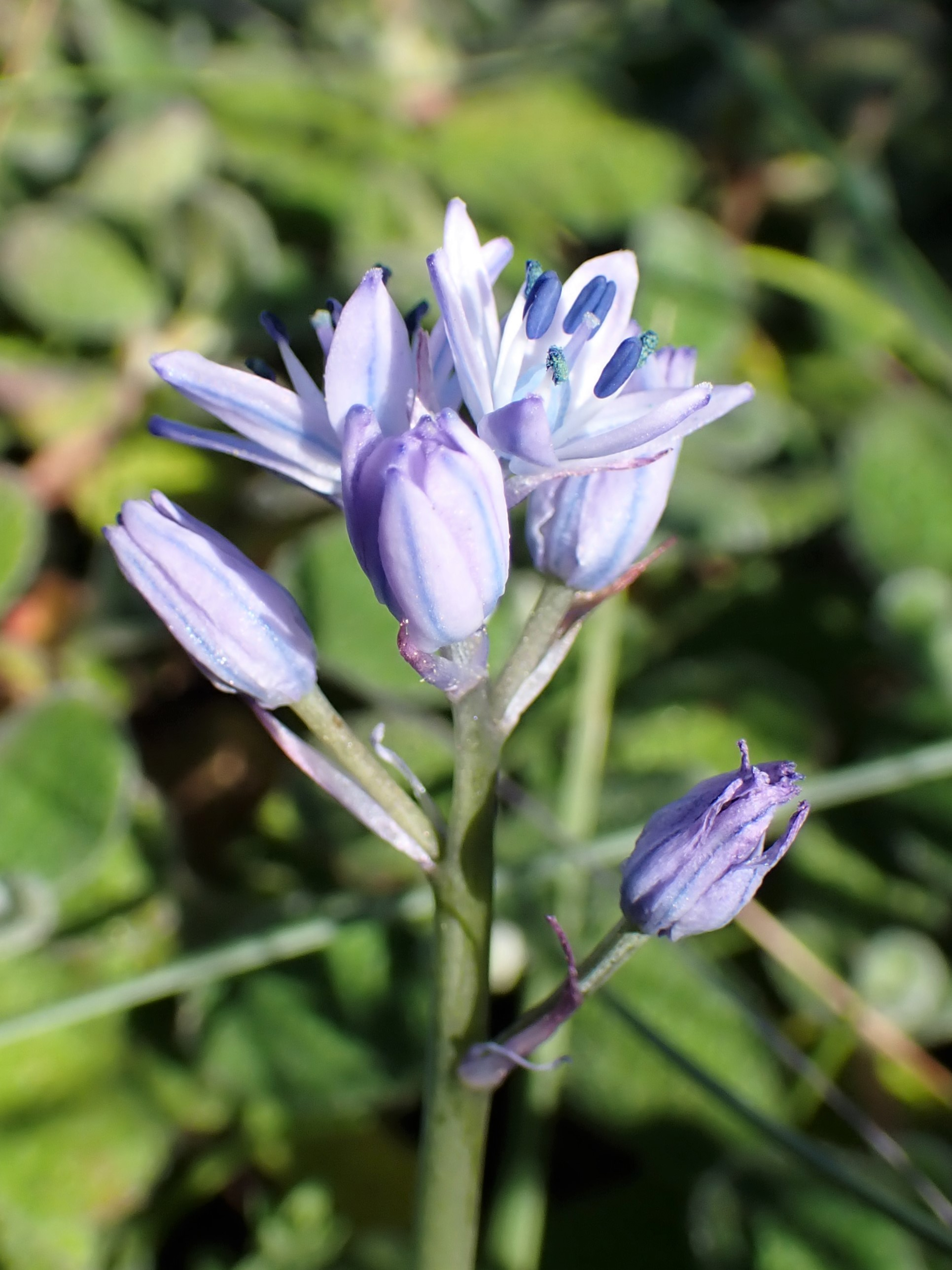

Conservation status
- Least Concern (IUCN 3.1)

Scientific classification
- Kingdom: Plantae
- Clade: Tracheophytes
- Clade: Angiosperms
- Clade: Monocots
- Order: Asparagales
- Family: Asparagaceae
- Subfamily: Scilloideae
- Genus: Hyacinthoides
- Species: H. mauritanica

Binomial name
- Hyacinthoides mauritanica (Schousb.) Speta

Synonyms
- List: Scilla mauritanica Schousb.; Scilla vincentina Link & Hoffmanns.; Scilla alvesiana Welw. ex Rouy; Endymion vincentinus (Link & Hoffmanns.) Chouard; Hyacinthoides vincentina (Link & Hoffmanns.) Rothm.; Scilla italica f. vincentina (Link & Hoffmanns.) Samp.; Scilla italica var. vincentina (Link & Hoffmanns.) Samp.; Hyacinthoides vincentina subsp. transtagana Franco & Rocha Afonso; Hyacinthoides mauritanica subsp. vincentina (Link & Hoffmanns.) S.Ortiz, Buján & Rodr.Oubiña

= Hyacinthoides mauritanica =

Species of flowering plant

Hyacinthoides mauritanica, the Mauritius bluebell, is a flowering plant endemic to Morocco and Portugal. It is a bulbous geophyte that grows primarily in temperate regions.

== Description ==
Hyacinthoides mauritanica is a species of dwarf bluebell, growing up to 10 cm (3.9 in) in height. It is a bulbous perennial, with long, narrow leaves and bell or star-shaped blue, violet or white flowers in spring.

== Distribution and habitat ==
It grows in open land, close to sea-level, in damp and often sandy soil.

When Hyacinthoides (or "Scilla") were found in Morocco in the past they were frequently mis-identified as mauritanica. However these are two distinct species, although they may still both be encountered under either name.
