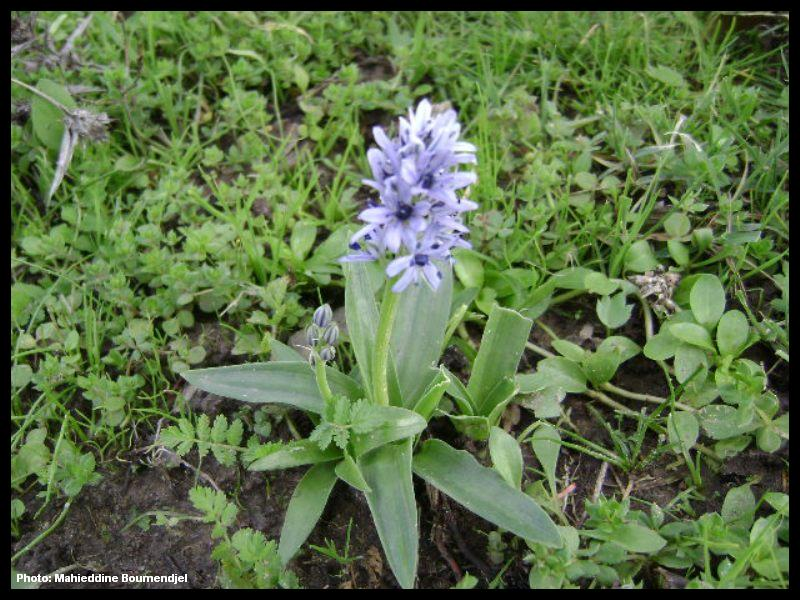

Scientific classification
- Kingdom: Plantae
- Clade: Tracheophytes
- Clade: Angiosperms
- Clade: Monocots
- Order: Asparagales
- Family: Asparagaceae
- Subfamily: Scilloideae
- Genus: Hyacinthoides
- Species: H. lingulata

Binomial name
- Hyacinthoides lingulata (Poir.) Rothm.

= Hyacinthoides lingulata =

Species of flowering plant

Hyacinthoides lingulata is a species of bulbous plant that lives in North Africa, from Morocco to Tunisia. It is widespread in short grass and agricultural fields, flowering in autumn when the rains begin. The flowers are generally paler than the common bluebell (Hyacinthoides non-scripta), but have a similar scent. Its leaves are not fully hardy, and it is usually grown under glass in the British Isles, where it requires a dry rest in summer and watering from early September until it dies back in May.
