= Bric delle Camere =

Mountain in Italy

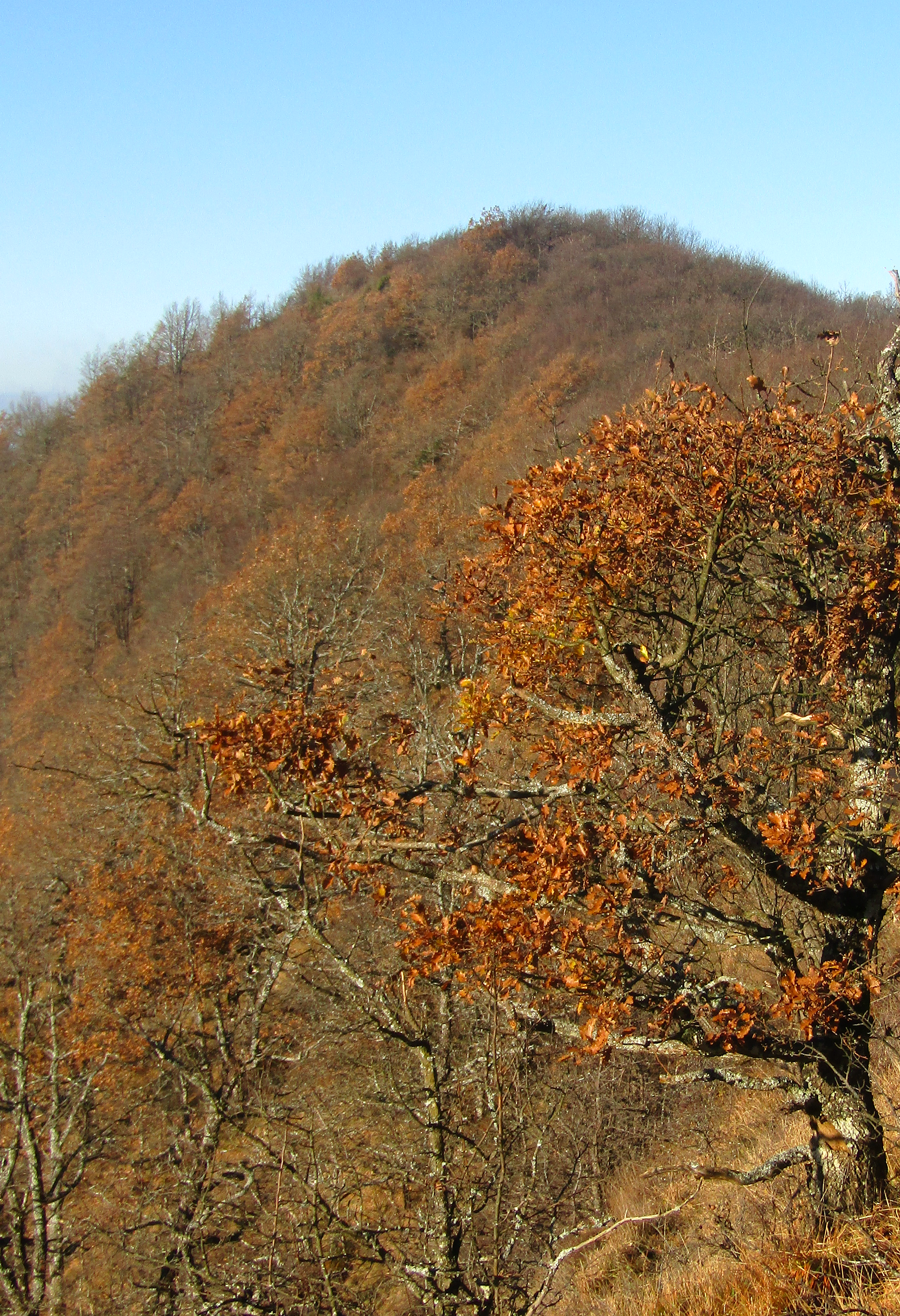

Highest point
- Elevation: 1,016 m (3,333 ft)
- Prominence: 219 m (719 ft)
- Coordinates: 44°38′21″N 9°01′52″E

Geography
- Location within Italy
- Location: Liguria, Italy
- Parent range: Ligurian Apennines

Bric delle Camere is a mountain in northern Italy, part of the Ligurian Apennines. It is located in the provinces of Genoa and Alessandria. It lies at an altitude of 1016 metres.

== Geography ==
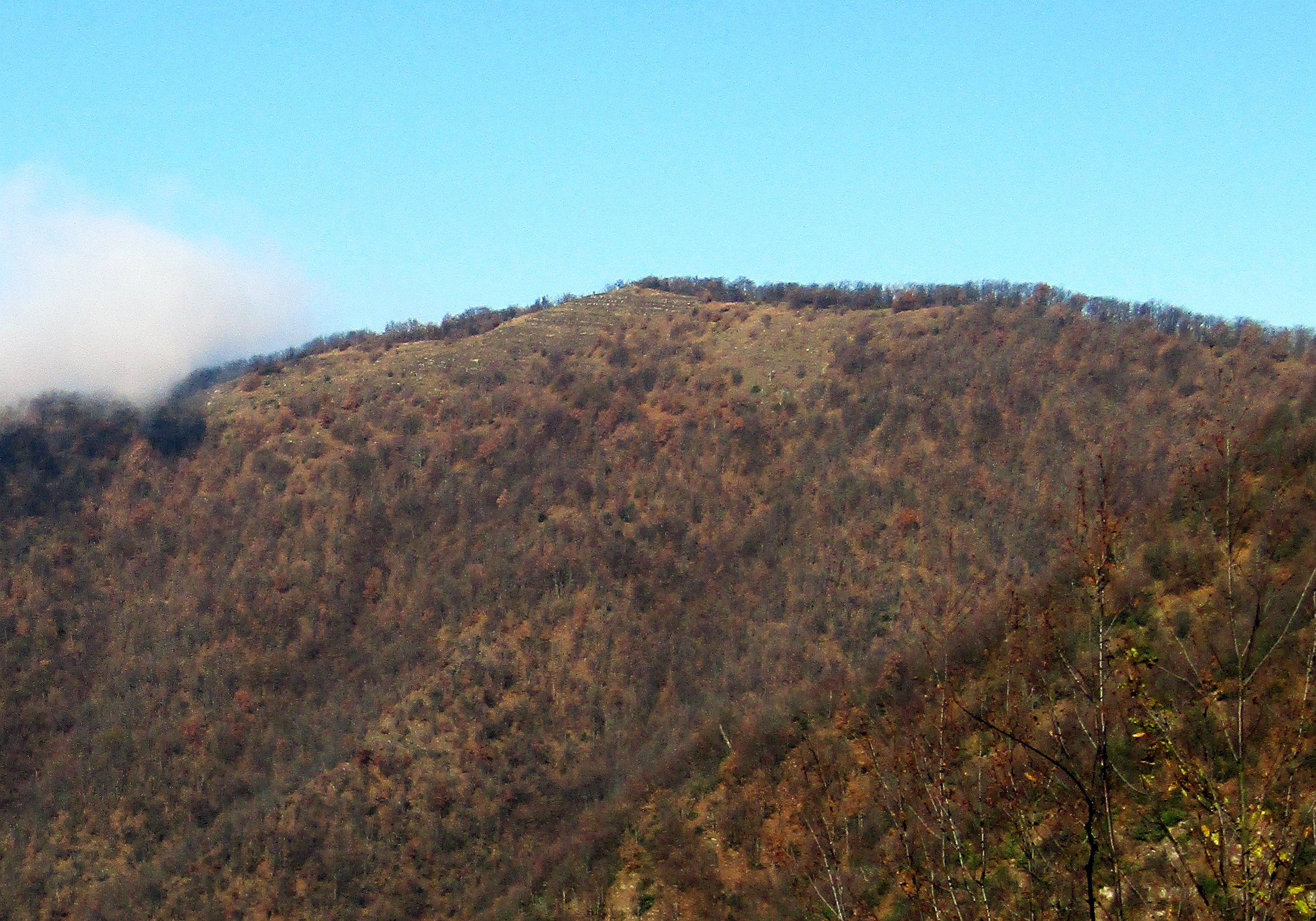
The mountain from Caprieto

The Bric delle Camere is located on the administrative border between the Metropolitan City of Genoa (Liguria) and the Province of Alessandria (Piemonte). Its summit is the tripoint where three valleys meet: Val Vobbia, Valle Spinti and Val Borbera. It's the highest summit of the area and is the spring of the Spinti.

== Access to the summit ==
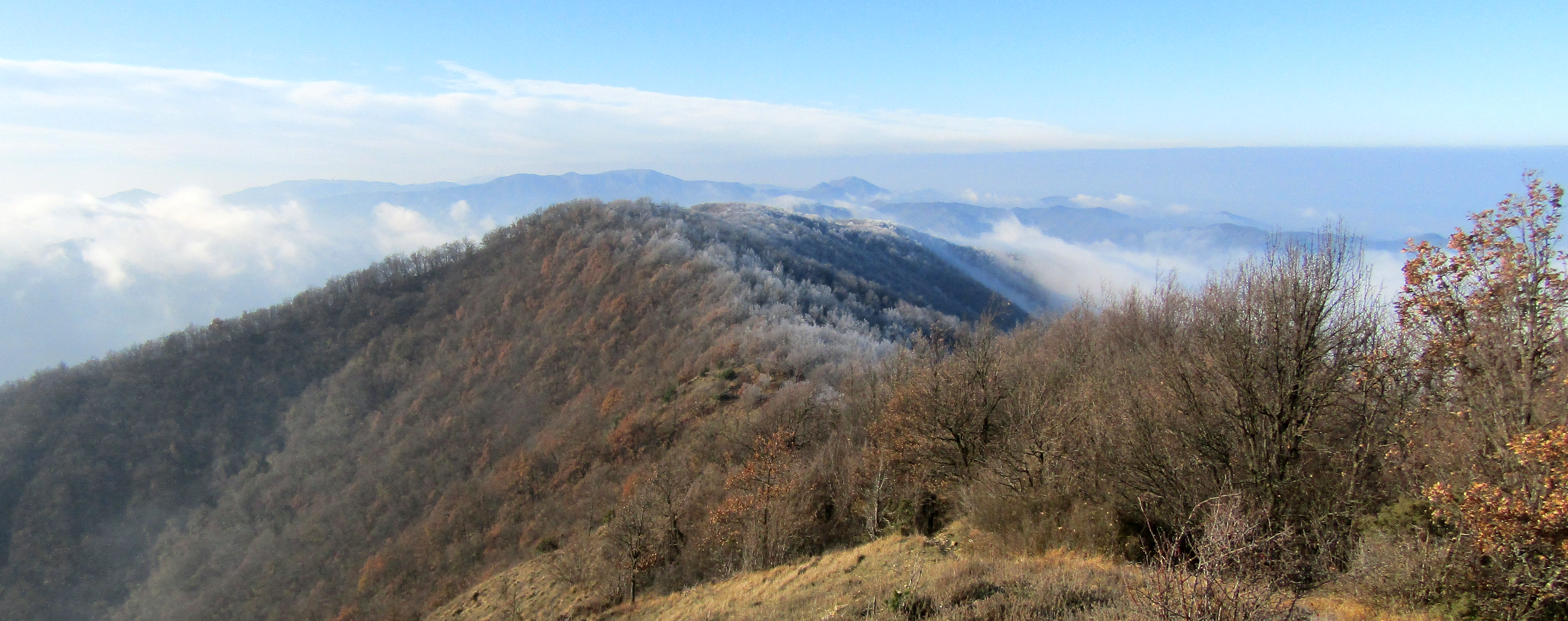
Autumn view from Bric delle Camere towards the Po plain

The summit of Bric delle Camere is crossed by the waymarked footpath nr. 200, which belongs to the '"Anello Bormida-Spinti" ("Bormida-Spinti ring"), a trekking itinerary of the hiking network of Regione Piemonte. It also can be accessed from Pertuso, with a walk which requires some hiking experience.

== Conservation ==
The Ligurian side of the mountain since 1989 is included in the Parco naturale regionale dell'Antola. On its Piedmontese slopes has been reported a population of Scilla italica, a plant of the lily family also known as Hyacinthoides italica and locally rather uncommon. Also the hyssop grows on the mountain.
