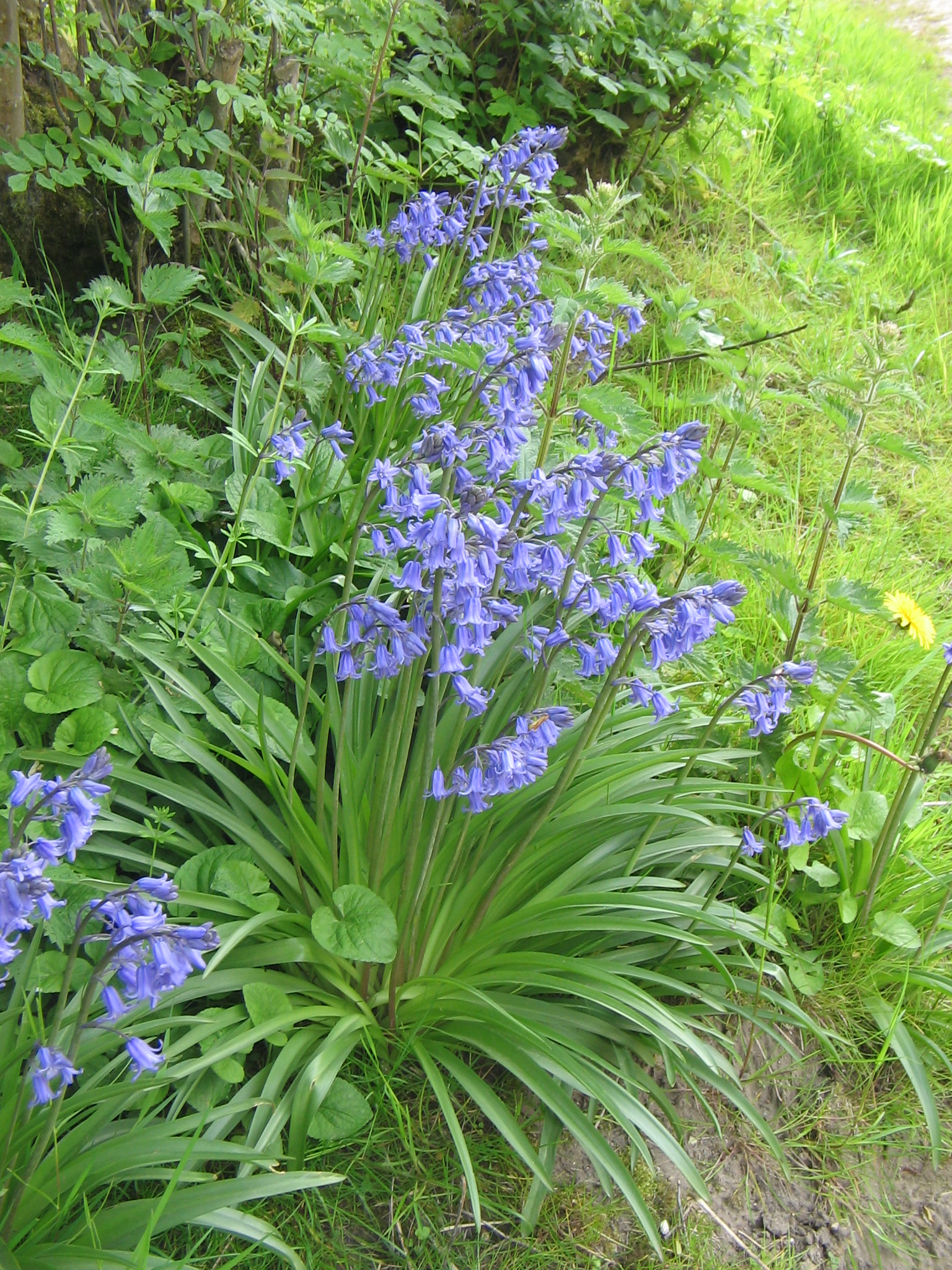

Scientific classification
- Kingdom: Plantae
- Clade: Tracheophytes
- Clade: Angiosperms
- Clade: Monocots
- Order: Asparagales
- Family: Asparagaceae
- Subfamily: Scilloideae
- Genus: Hyacinthoides
- Species: H. × massartiana

Binomial name
- Hyacinthoides × massartiana Geerinck

Synonyms
- "Hyacinthoides × variabilis" P.D.Sell

= Hyacinthoides × massartiana =

Species of flowering plant

Hyacinthoides × massartiana is a hybrid species produced by crosses between the common bluebell, H. non-scripta and the Spanish bluebell, H. hispanica. H. × massartiana fills a spectrum of variation which connects the two parental species.

== Distribution ==
Hyacinthoides × massartiana has become widespread in Britain and Belgium, both of which have large populations of H. non-scripta. It is often found on the edges of woodlands and roadsides, particularly in urban areas, which suggests that it has spread from gardens planted with H. hispanica. There is great concern over the effect that this hybrid may have on native H. non-scripta populations, as it could dilute their characteristics and outcompete them due to H. hispanica's robust fertility and the effects of climate change.

== Taxonomic history ==
Hybrids between H. non-scripta and H. hispanica were first given a specific name in 1997, when the Belgian botanist D. Geerinck described them as H. × massartiana, honouring the botanist Jean Massart. The type locality is Watermael-Boitsfort, near Brussels, Belgium; the holotype is held in Brussels, with an isotype in Liège. The same taxon had already been given the name "Hyacinthoides × variabilis" by P. D. Sell in 1996 in the Flora of Great Britain and Ireland, but without a valid Latin diagnosis.
