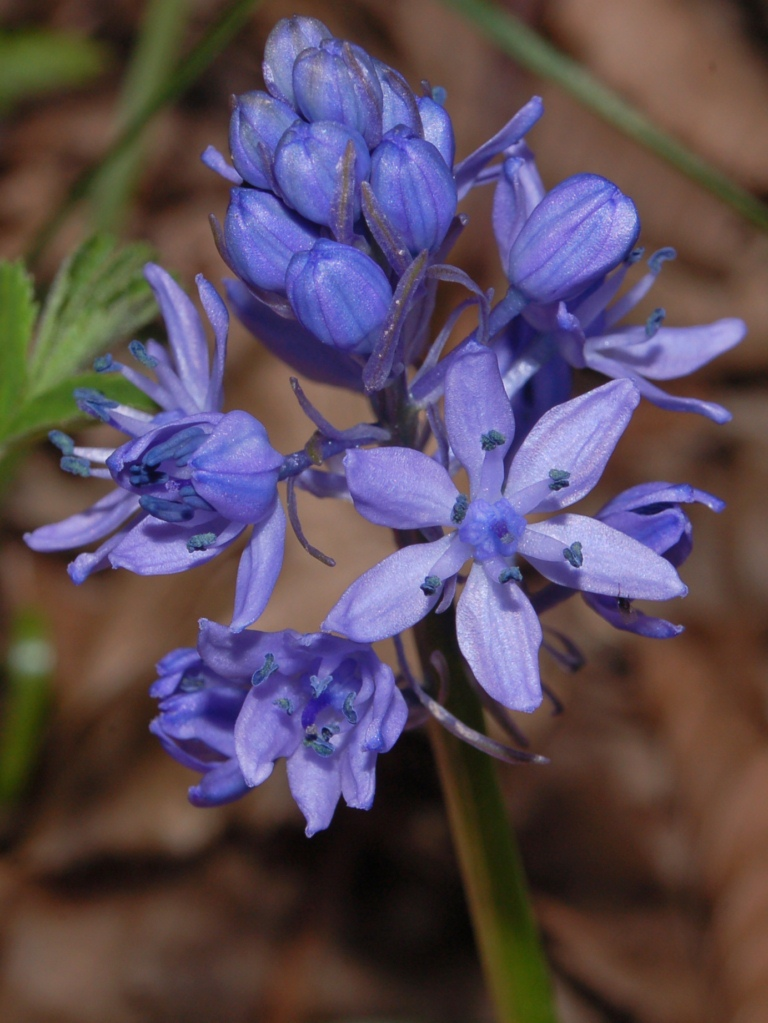

Scientific classification
- Kingdom: Plantae
- Clade: Tracheophytes
- Clade: Angiosperms
- Clade: Monocots
- Order: Asparagales
- Family: Asparagaceae
- Subfamily: Scilloideae
- Genus: Hyacinthoides
- Species: H. italica

Binomial name
- Hyacinthoides italica (L.) Chouard ex Rothm.

Synonyms
- Endymion italicus (L.) Chouard; Hyacinthus italicus (L.) E.H.L.Krause; Ornithogalum spicatum Gaterau; Scilla bertolonii Duby; Scilla byzantina Poir.; Scilla italica L.; Scilla pallida Salisb.; Scilla pauciflora Link ex Schult. & Schult.; Scilla purpurea Mill.; Somera italica (L.) Salisb.

= Hyacinthoides italica =

Species of flowering plant

Hyacinthoides italica, the Italian bluebell or Italian squill, is a spring-flowering bulbous perennial plant belonging to the family Asparagaceae.

It is one of around 11 species in the genus Hyacinthoides, others including the common bluebell (Hyacinthoides non-scripta) in northwestern Europe, and the Spanish bluebell (Hyacinthoides hispanica) further west in the Iberian Peninsula.

== Description ==
Hyacinthoides italica is up to 10–40 centimetres (3.9–15.7 in) tall. The stem is leafless. It has 3-6 basal lance-shaped leaves, 4–15 millimetres (0.16–0.59 in) wide and 7–15 centimetres (2.8–5.9 in) long. The inflorescence is a dense, conical or pyramid-like raceme with 5-30 bright violet-blue star-like flowers. The flowers have two narrow bracts. Flowering period extends from February to May.

It is in some respects intermediate between the common and Spanish species in having slender leaves (as in H. non-scripta or even slenderer), but a dense raceme of flowers (as in H. hispanica; not sparse and one-sided as in H. non-scripta).

Hyacinthoides italica is used as an ornamental plant. It has gained the Royal Horticultural Society's Award of Garden Merit.

== Distribution ==
This species is native to the central Mediterranean region, in northwestern Italy, in southern France, and in northeastern Spain.

== Habitat ==
It can be found in olive groves, in dry and stony meadows and in clearings of forests at an elevation up to 1,700 metres (5,600 ft) above sea level.

== Gallery ==
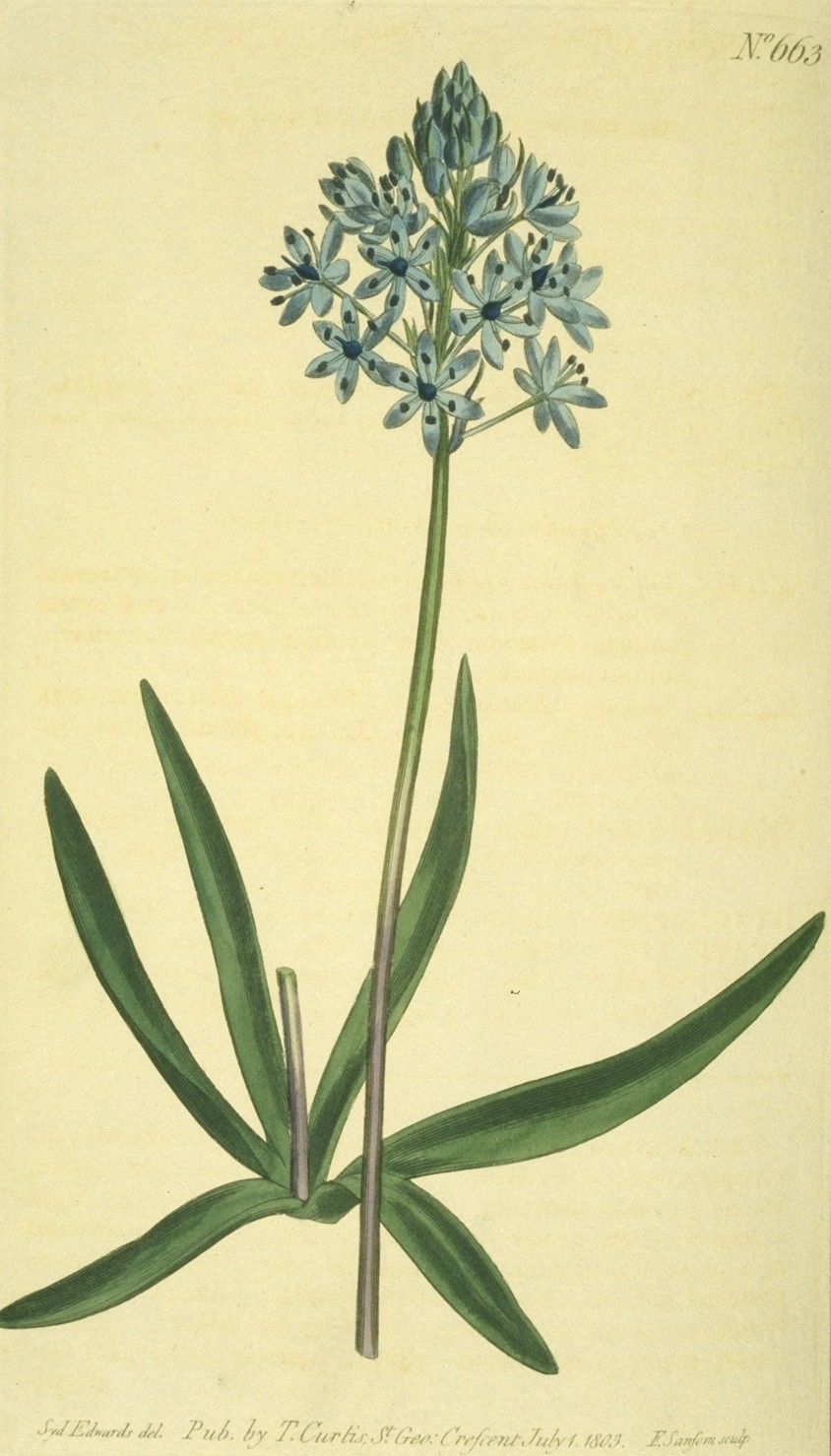

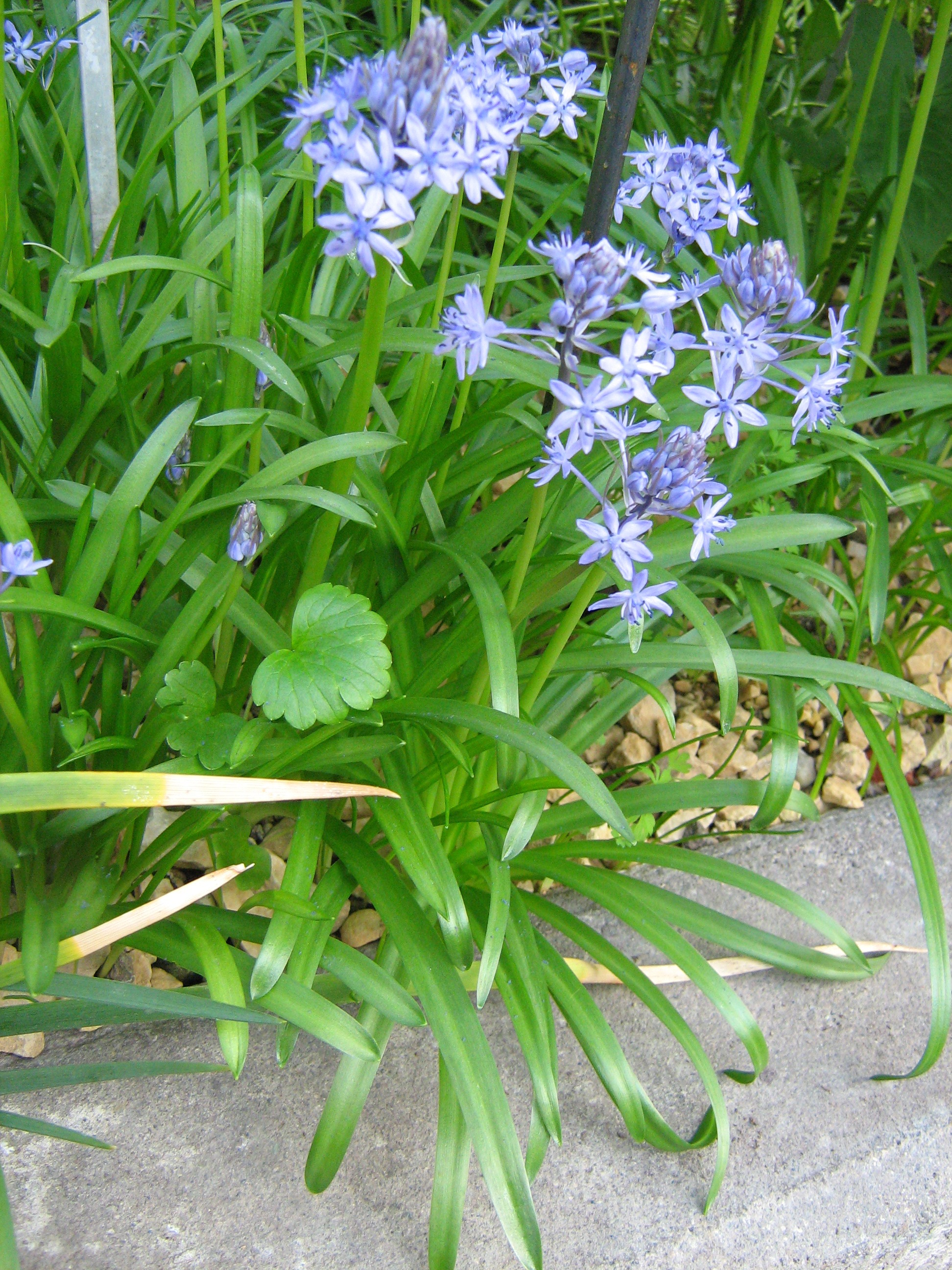

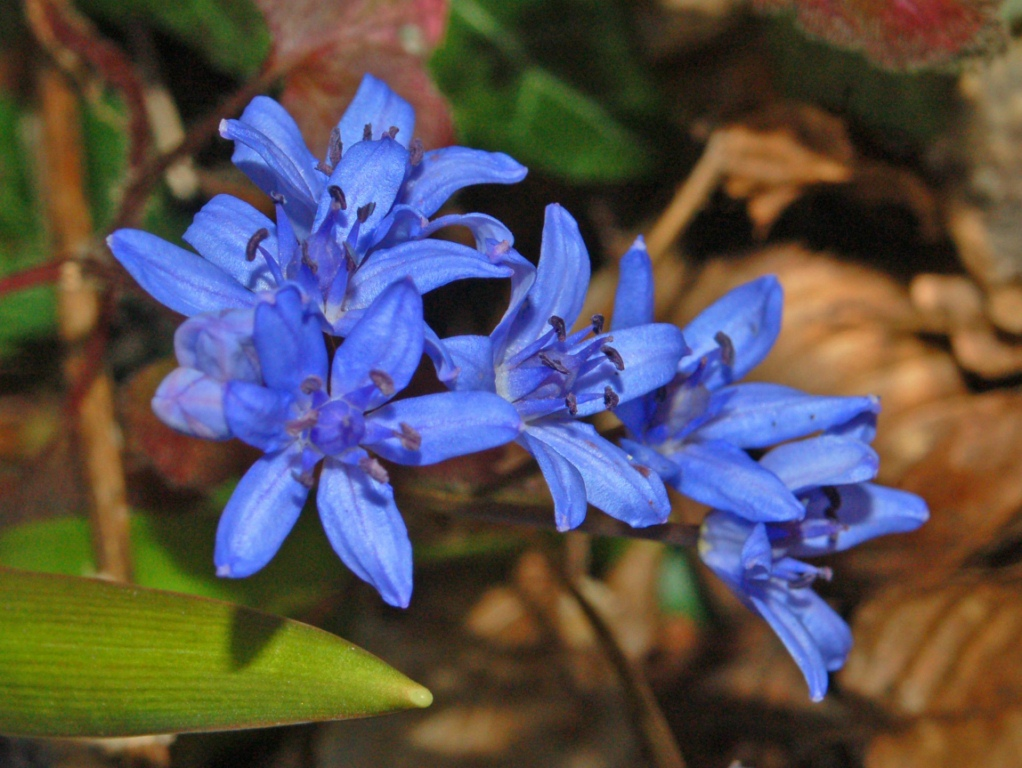

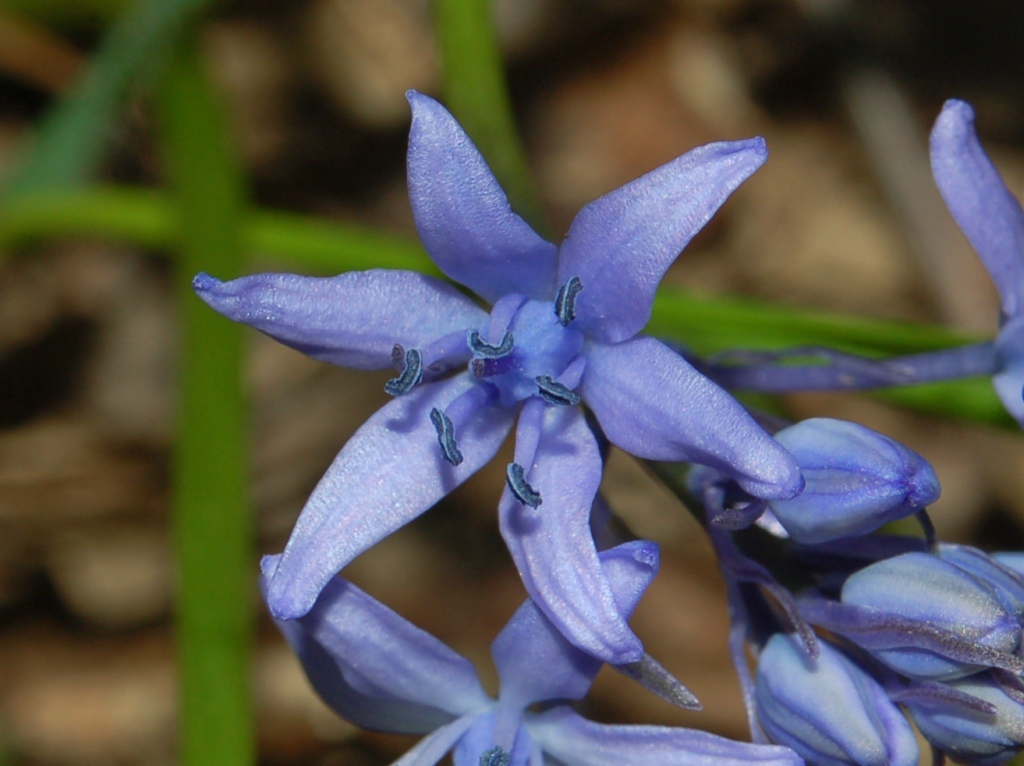
