= Brimeura duvigneaudii =

Conservation status
- Critically Endangered (IUCN 3.1)

Scientific classification
- Kingdom: Plantae
- Clade: Tracheophytes
- Clade: Angiosperms
- Clade: Monocots
- Order: Asparagales
- Family: Asparagaceae
- Subfamily: Scilloideae
- Genus: Brimeura
- Species: B. duvigneaudii

Binomial name
- Brimeura duvigneaudii (L.Llorens) Rosselló, Mus & Mayol

Species of flowering plant

Brimeura duvigneaudii is a species of plant that is endemic to the Balearic Islands of Spain. Its natural habitats are Mediterranean matorral shrubland, and above rocky shores. In January 1991, the Parliament of the Balearic Islands approved a resolution on regional level protection status for B. duvigneaudii. The species is listed in the Red List of the Spanish Vascular Plants, the Spanish Red Book, and the Catalogue of Threatened Species of the Balearic Islands.
