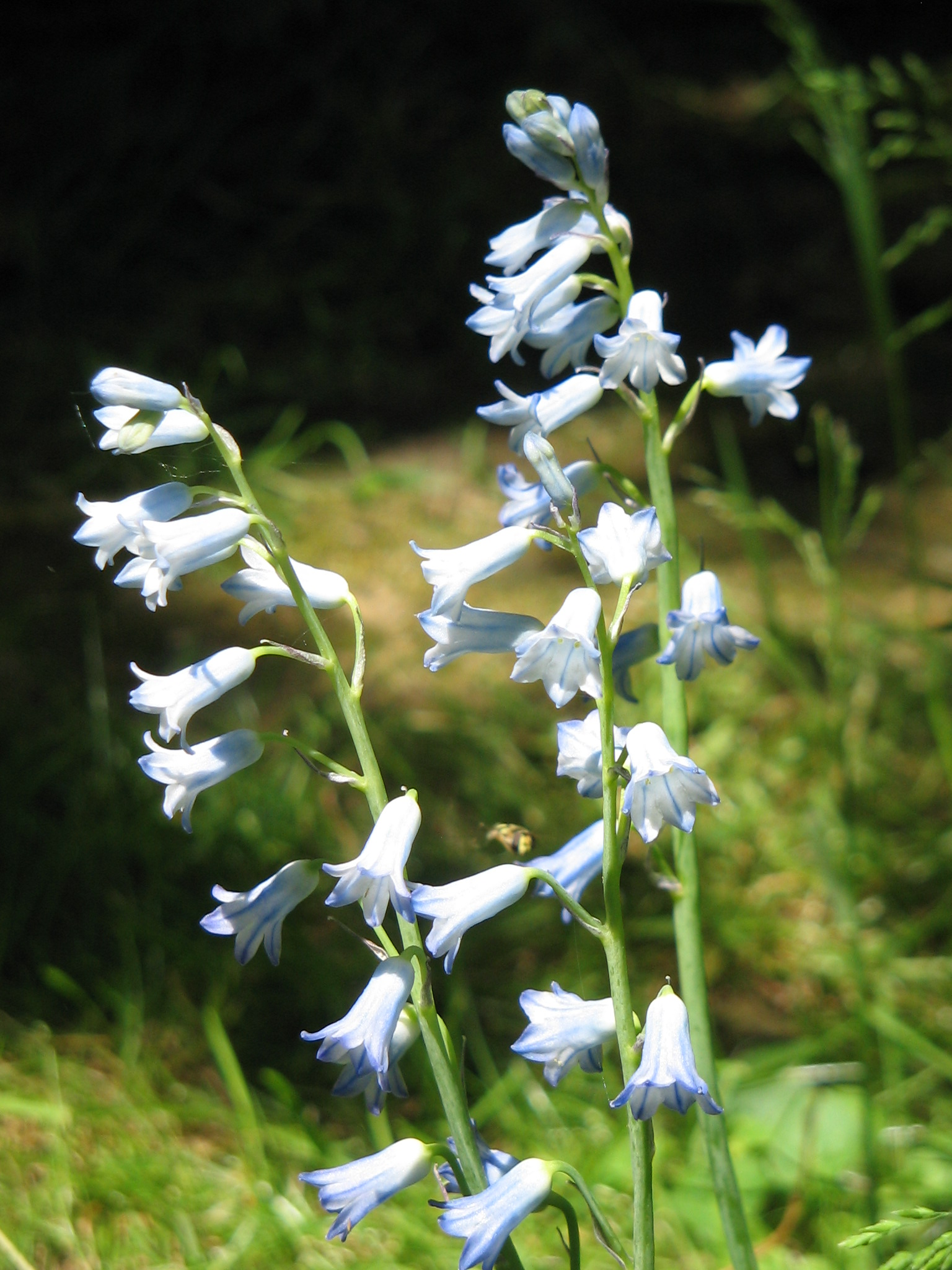

Scientific classification
- Kingdom: Plantae
- Clade: Tracheophytes
- Clade: Angiosperms
- Clade: Monocots
- Order: Asparagales
- Family: Asparagaceae
- Subfamily: Scilloideae
- Genus: Brimeura
- Species: B. amethystina

Binomial name
- Brimeura amethystina (L.) Chouard.

= Brimeura amethystina =

Species of flowering plant

Brimeura amethystina, the amethyst hyacinth, is a flowering plant of the asparagus family Asparagaceae, native to the Northern Pyrenees and north east Spain. The record from the Kapela mountain (Croatia) by Reichenbach (1830) is probably a confusion with some Hyacinthella taxon growing in the Balkan area.

The amethyst hyacinth, a small bulbous herbaceous perennial to 20 cm (7.9 in), it has narrow grass-like leaves, and widely-spaced bell flowers in shades of pale blue, dark blue or violet in Spring. There is also a white cultivar 'Alba'. It was formerly placed in the hyacinth genus Hyacinthus.

The Latin specific epithet amethystina means "violet coloured".

In cultivation in the UK this plant has gained the Royal Horticultural Society's Award of Garden Merit.

== Gallery ==
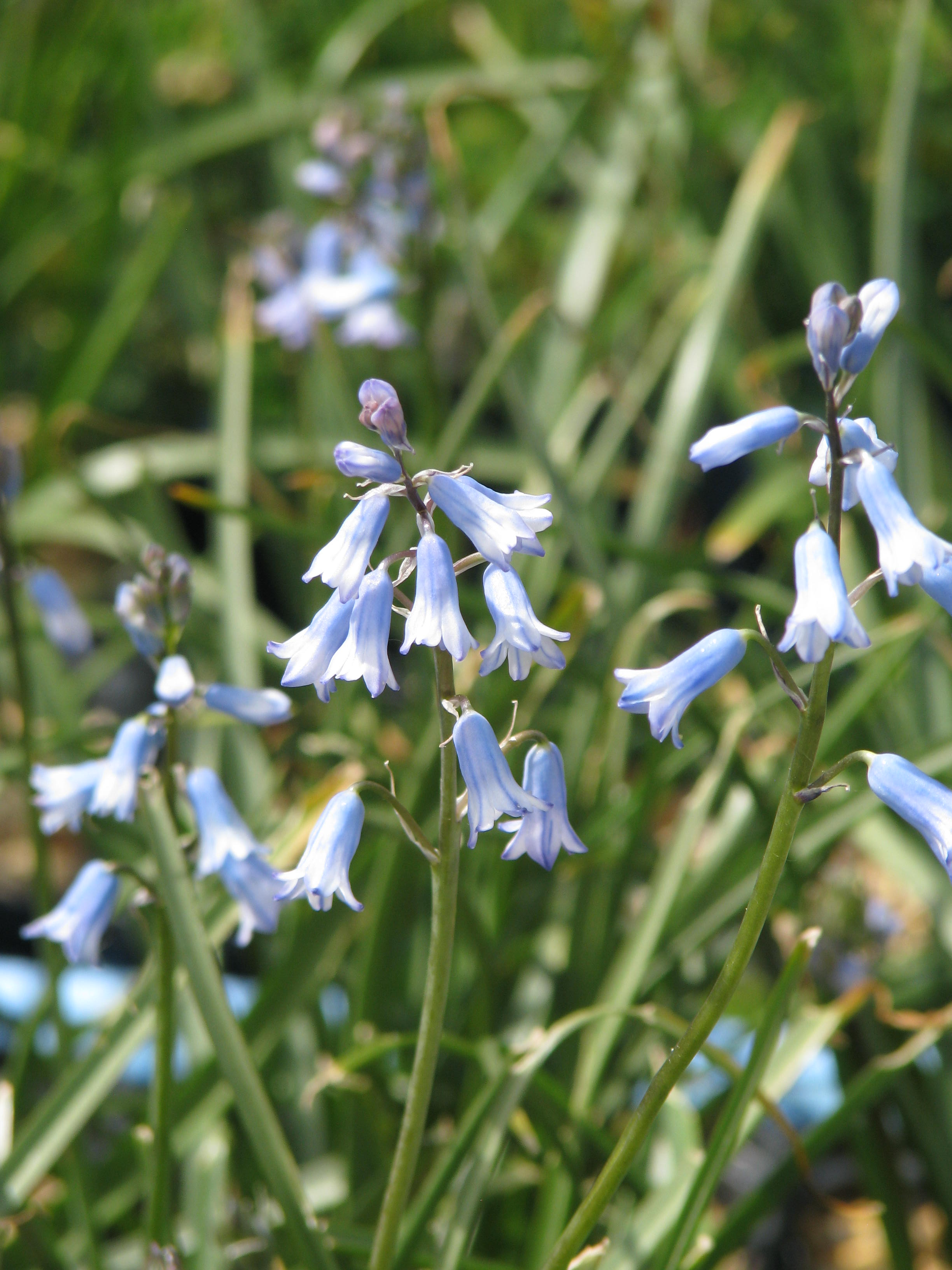
Flowers

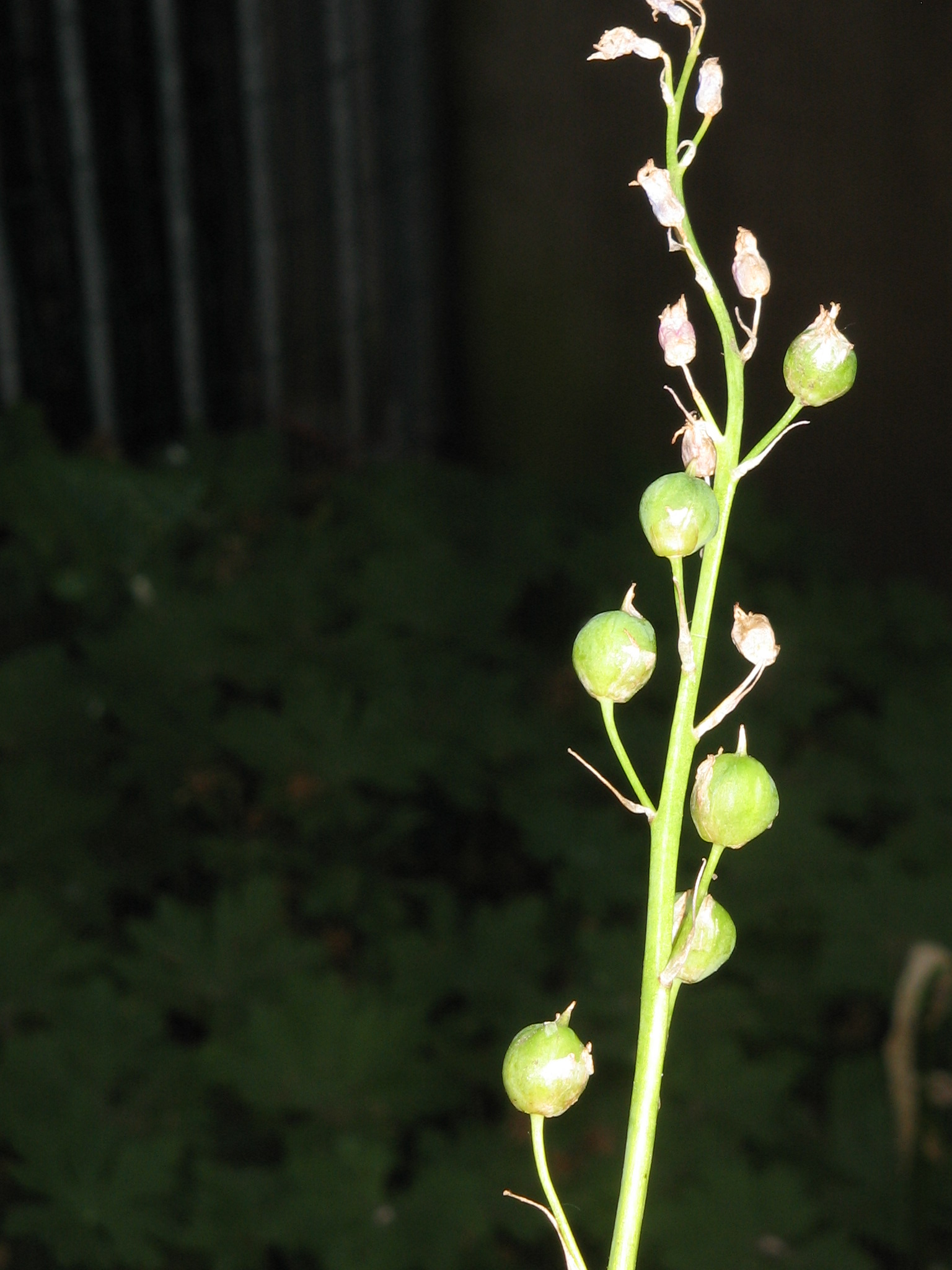
Fruits

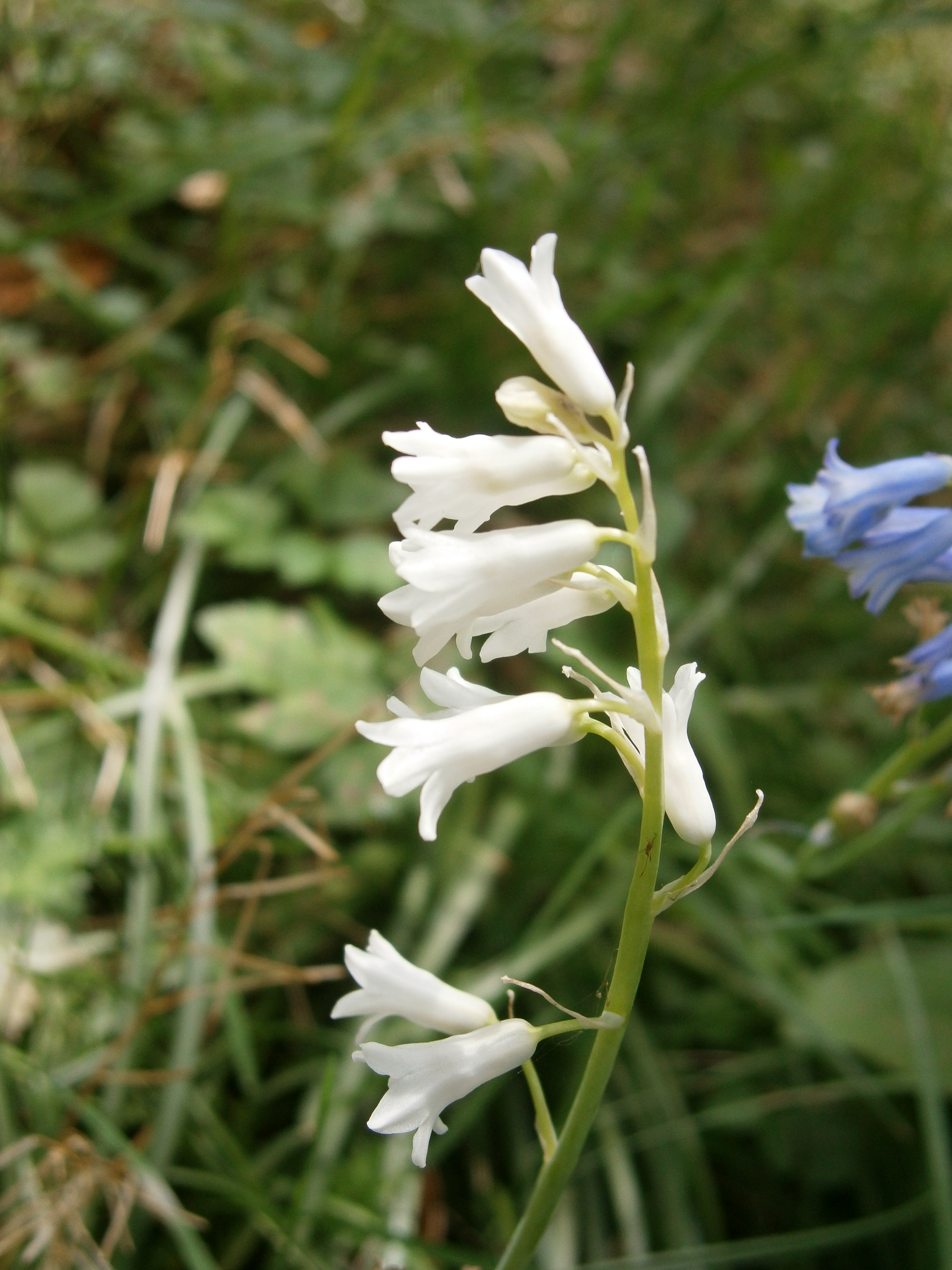
’Alba’ cultivar
