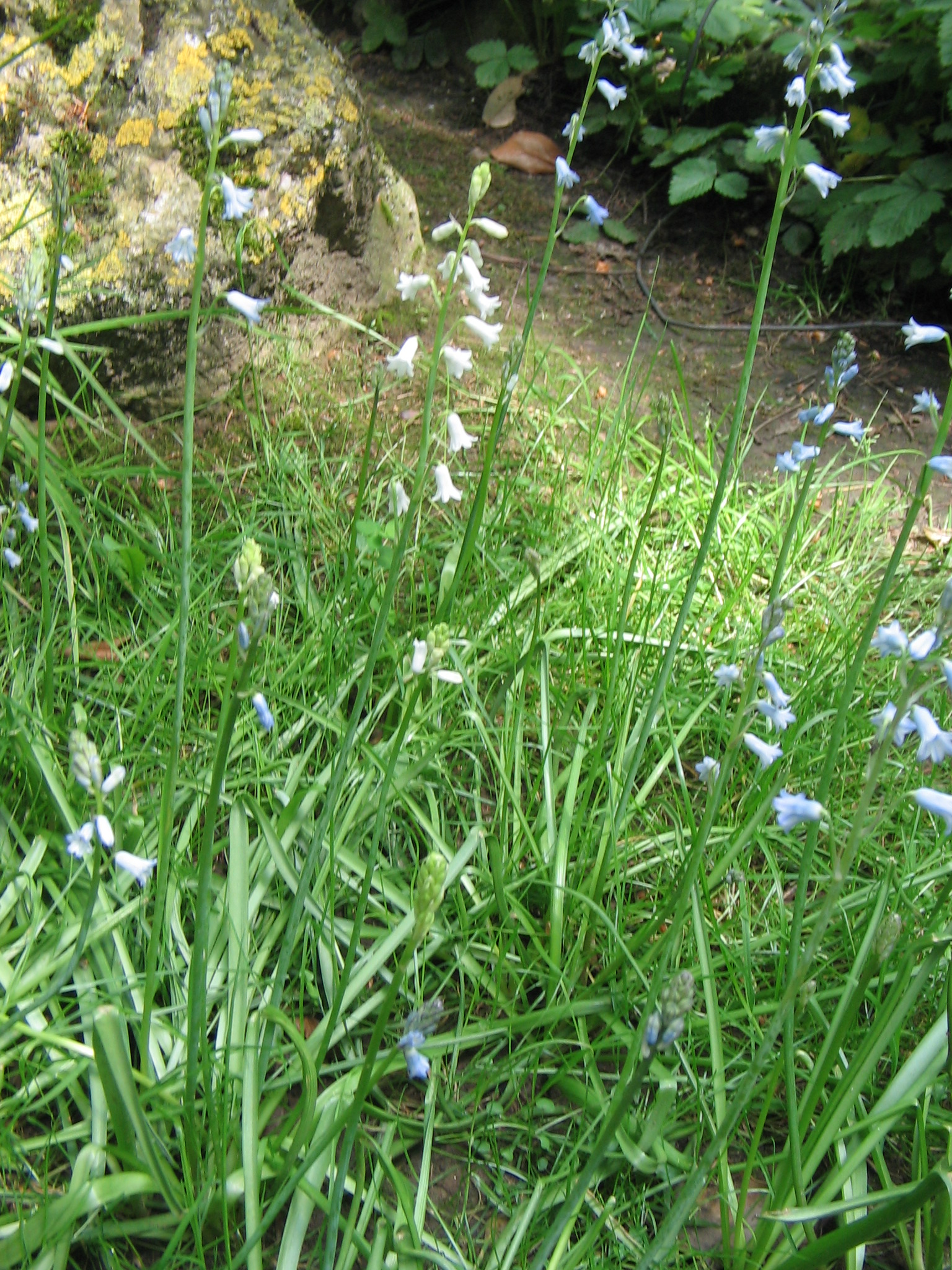
- Brimeura amethystina

Scientific classification
- Kingdom: Plantae
- Clade: Tracheophytes
- Clade: Angiosperms
- Clade: Monocots
- Order: Asparagales
- Family: Asparagaceae
- Subfamily: Scilloideae
- Genus: Brimeura; Salisb.

Type species
- Brimeura amethystina L.

Synonyms
- Sarcomphalium Dulac; Charistemma Janka

= Brimeura =

Genus of flowering plants

Brimeura is a genus of bulb-forming, monocotyledonous perennial plants. They have narrow leaves and bear bluebell-like flowers in Spring. Brimeura is treated in the family Asparagaceae, subfamily Scilloideae, tribe Hyacintheae, subtribe Hyacinthinae. It contains the following species

- Brimeura amethystina (L.) Chouard - Pyrenees
- Brimeura duvigneaudii (L.Llorens) Rosselló, Mus & Mayol - Mallorca
- Brimeura fastigiata (Viv.) Chouard - Mallorca, Menorca, Corsica, Sardinia

Salisbury states that he named the genus in honour of the seventeenth century Netherlandish botanist and horticulturalist, Marie de Brimeu.

The genus is native to southeastern Europe and certain islands of the western Mediterranean. The species B. amethystina (formerly Hyacinthus amethystina) has gained the Royal Horticultural Society's Award of Garden Merit.

== Bibliography ==
- Pfosser, M.; Wetschnig, W.; Ungar, S.; Prenner, G. (2003). "Phylogenetic relationships among genera of Massonieae (Hyacinthaceae) inferred from plastid DNA and seed morphology". Journal of Plant Research. 116 (2): 115–132. Bibcode:2003JPlR..116..115P. doi:10.1007/s10265-003-0076-8. PMID 12736783. S2CID 7554964.
- Salisbury, Richard Anthony; Gray, J. E. (1866). The Genera of Plants (Unpublished fragment). J. Van Voorst. p. 26.
- Stevens, P.F. (2017) [2001]. "Angiosperm Phylogeny Website: Hyacinthaceae". Missouri Botanical Garden. (see also Angiosperm Phylogeny Website)
- "Brimeura". Flora Iberica. Real Jardín Botánico. 2017.
  - Goñalons, Llorenç Sáez (2014). "Brimeura L.". In Talavera, S; Andrés, C; Arista, M; Fernández Piedra, MP; Rico, E; Crespo, MB; Quintanar, A; Herrero, A; Aedo, C (eds.). Flora Iberica. Vol 20 (PDF) (in Spanish). Madrid: Real Jardín Botánico, Consejo Superior de Investigaciones Científicas.
