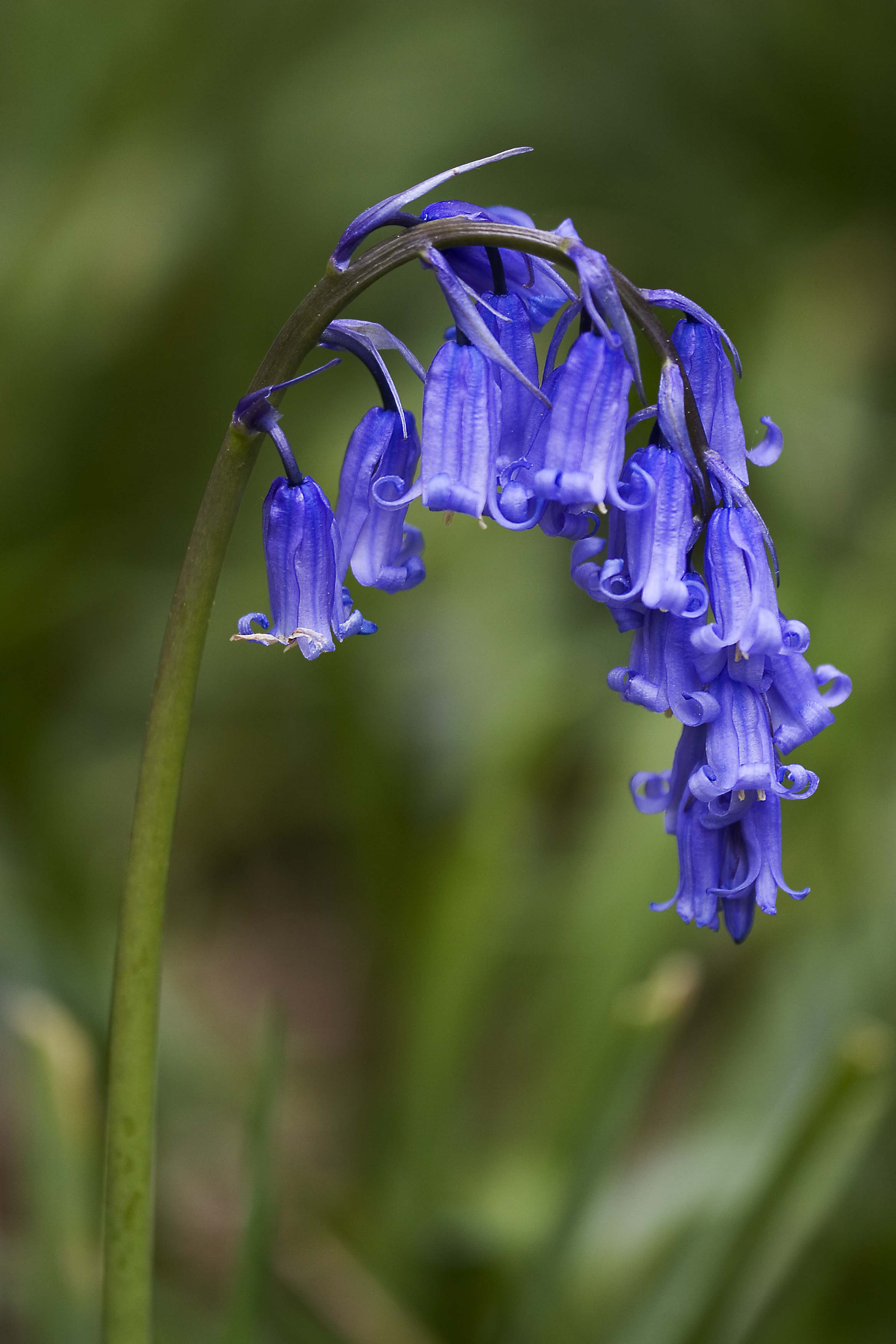

Scientific classification
- Kingdom: Plantae
- Clade: Tracheophytes
- Clade: Angiosperms
- Clade: Monocots
- Order: Asparagales
- Family: Asparagaceae
- Subfamily: Scilloideae
- Genus: Hyacinthoides
- Species: H. non-scripta

Binomial name
- Hyacinthoides non-scripta (L.) Chouard ex Rothm.

Synonyms
- Hyacinthus non-scriptus L.; Scilla festalis Salisb. (nom. illeg.); Scilla nutans Sm. in Sowerby & Smith (nom. illeg.); Scilla non-scripta (L.) Link & Hoffmanns.; Endymion nutans Dumort. (nom. illeg.); Agraphis nutans Link. (nom. illeg.); Endymion non-scriptus (L.) Garcke; Hyacinthus cernuus L.; Scilla cernua (L.) Hoffmanns. & Link; Endymion cernuus (L.) Dumort.

= Hyacinthoides non-scripta =

Species of flowering plant

Hyacinthoides non-scripta /ˌhaɪəsɪnˈθɔɪdiːz nɒnˈskrɪptə/ (formerly Endymion non-scriptus or Scilla non-scripta) is a bulbous perennial plant found in Atlantic areas from the north-western part of the Iberian Peninsula to the British Isles, and also frequently used as a garden plant. It is known in English as the common bluebell, English bluebell or simply bluebell, a name which is used in Scotland to refer to the harebell, Campanula rotundifolia. In spring, H. non-scripta produces a nodding, one-sided inflorescence of 5–12 tubular, sweet-scented violet–blue flowers, with strongly recurved tepals, and 3–6 long, linear, basal leaves.

H. non-scripta is particularly associated with ancient woodland where it may dominate the understory to produce carpets of violet–blue flowers in "bluebell woods", but also occurs in more open habitats in western regions. It is protected under UK law, and in some other parts of its range. A related species, H. hispanica, has also been introduced to Britain and Ireland and hybridises with H. non-scripta to produce intermediates known as H. × massartiana.

== Taxonomy ==
Hyacinthoides non-scripta was first described by Carl Linnaeus in his 1753 work Species Plantarum, as a species in the genus Hyacinthus. The specific epithet non-scripta means "unlettered" or "unmarked" and was intended to distinguish this plant from the classical hyacinth of Greek mythology. This mythical flower, which was almost certainly not the modern hyacinth, sprang up from the blood of the dying prince Hyacinthus. His lover, the god Apollo, shed tears that marked the new flower's petals with the letters "AIAI" ("alas") as a sign of his grief.

In 1803, Johann Centurius von Hoffmannsegg and Johann Heinrich Friedrich Link transferred the species to the genus Scilla, and in 1849 Christian August Friedrich Garcke transferred it to the genus Endymion (now a synonym of Hyacinthoides); it is still widely known as "Scilla non-scripta" or "Endymion non-scriptus". In 1934, Pierre Chouard transferred the species to its current placement in the genus Hyacinthoides. Scilla was the original Greek name for the sea squill, Drimia maritima; Endymion is a character from Greek mythology; Hyacinthoides means "like a hyacinth".

The type species of Hyacinthoides is H. hispanica, while that of Endymion is "Scilla nutans", described by James Edward Smith in English Botany in 1797, but now treated as a synonym of H. non-scripta. Smith had argued that nutans ("nodding") is a more fitting epithet than non-scriptus, which makes no sense once separated from Hyacinthus, but the International Code of Nomenclature for algae, fungi, and plants requires the oldest name to be used, regardless of meaning.

Common names for Hyacinthoides non-scripta include bluebell, common bluebell, English bluebell, British bluebell, wild hyacinth, wood bell, fairy flower and bell bottle. In Scotland, the term "bluebell" is used for the harebell, Campanula rotundifolia.

=== Related species ===
Hyacinthoides non-scripta forms a clade with three other species – H. hispanica, H. paivae and H. cedretorum – centred on the Iberian Peninsula. H. paivae is restricted to a small area of north-western Iberia (Galicia and neighbouring parts of Portugal), while H. cedretorum is found in mountainous areas of western North Africa (Morocco and Algeria). Within Iberia, H. non-scripta and H. hispanica are geographically separated by the river Duero. The genus also contains seven further species, mostly distributed further east in the Mediterranean Basin.

== Description ==
Comparison of H. non-scripta and H. hispanica

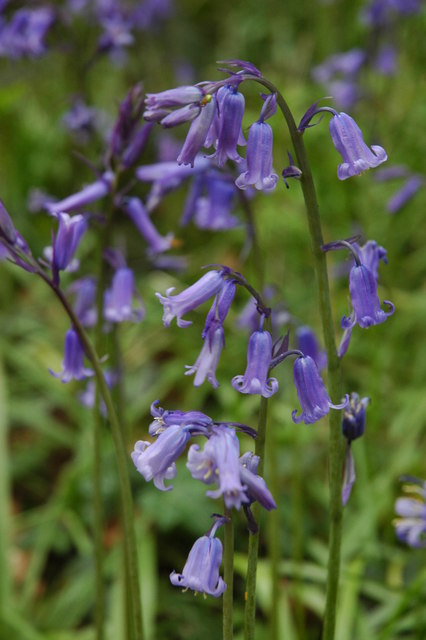
H. non-scripta has dark flowers in one-sided, nodding racemes, with strongly recurved petals and white pollen.

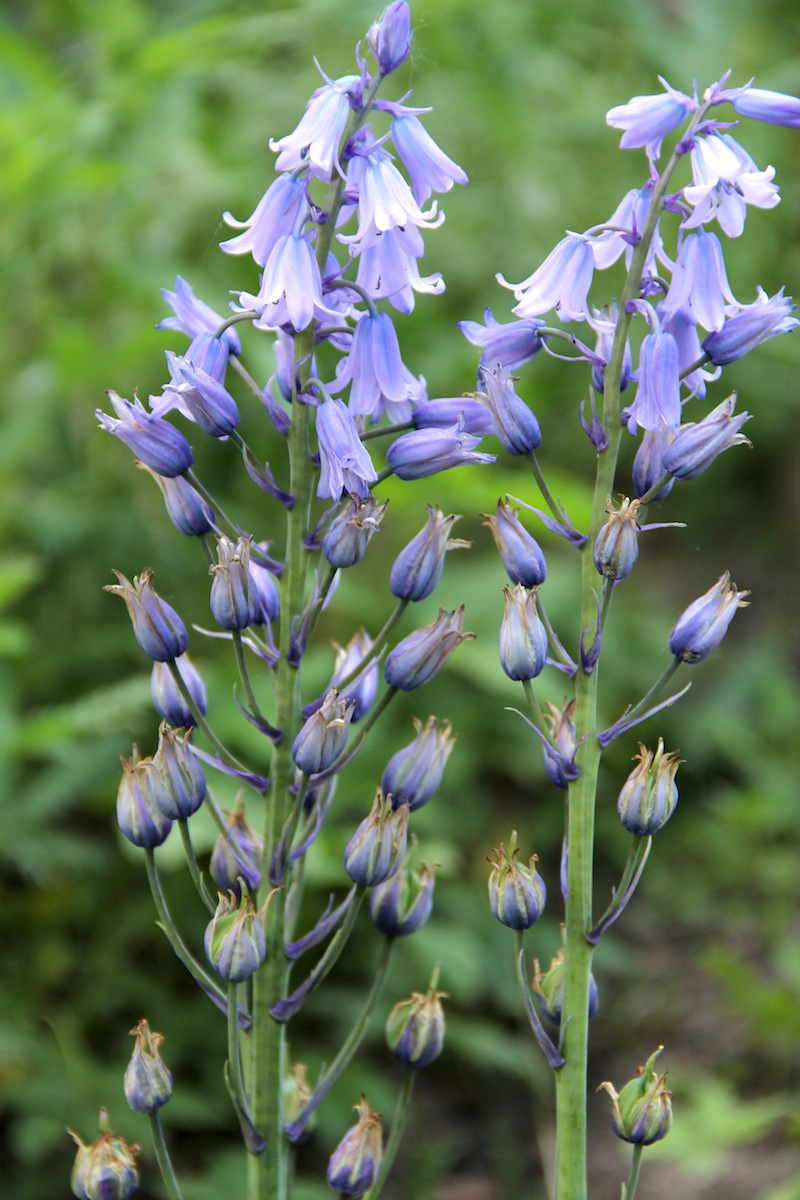
H. hispanica has paler flowers produced on all sides of the upright stem, less recurved petals and blue pollen.

Hyacinthoides non-scripta is a perennial plant that grows from a bulb. It produces 3–6 linear leaves, all growing from the base of the plant, and each 7–16 millimetres (0.28–0.63 in) wide. An inflorescence of 5–12 (exceptionally 3–32) flowers is borne on a stem up to 500 mm (20 in) tall, which droops towards the tip; the flowers are arranged in a 1-sided nodding raceme. Each flower is 14–20 mm (0.55–0.79 in) long, with two bracts at the base, and the six tepals are strongly recurved at their tips. The tepals are violet–blue. The three stamens in the outer whorl are fused to the perianth for more than 75% of their length, and bear cream-coloured pollen. The flowers are strongly and sweetly scented. The seeds are black, and germinate on the soil surface.

The bulbs produce contractile roots; when these roots contract, they draw the bulbs down into deeper layers of the soil where there is greater moisture, reaching depths of 10–12 cm (3.9–4.7 in). This may explain the absence of H. non-scripta from some thin soils over chalk in South East England, since the bulbs are unable to penetrate into sufficiently deep soils.

H. non-scripta differs from H. hispanica, which occurs as an introduced species in Britain and Ireland, in a number of ways. H. hispanica has paler flowers which are borne in radially symmetrical racemes; their tepals are less recurved, and are only faintly scented. The outer stamens are fused with the tepals for less than 75% of their length, and the anthers are the same colour as the tepals. These two species are thought to have diverged 8000 years ago. The two species hybridise readily to produce fertile offspring known as Hyacinthoides × massartiana; the hybrids are intermediate between the parental species, forming a spectrum of variation which connects the two.

== Distribution and ecology ==
Bluebell habitats

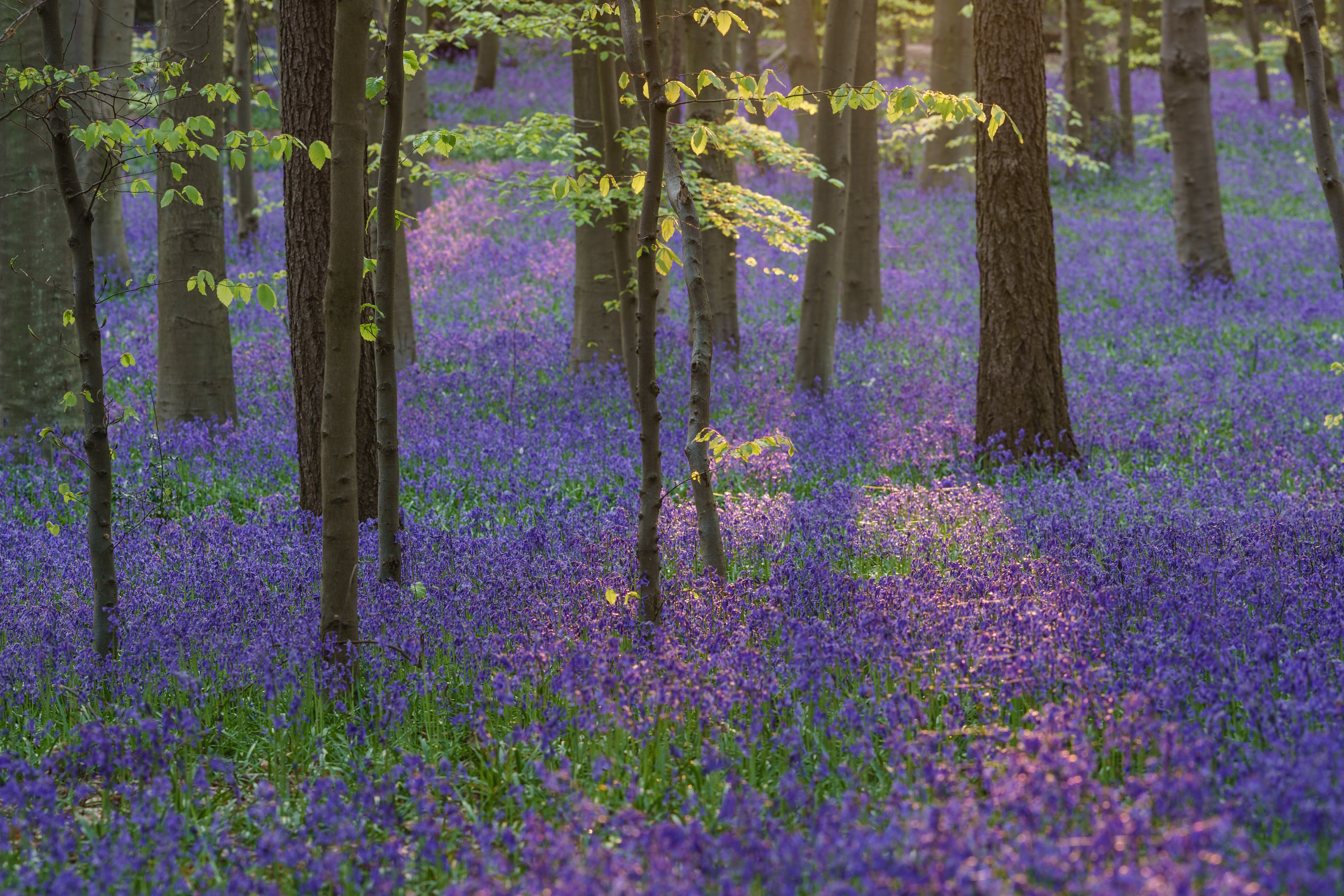
Bluebells in Pryor's Wood, Hertfordshire

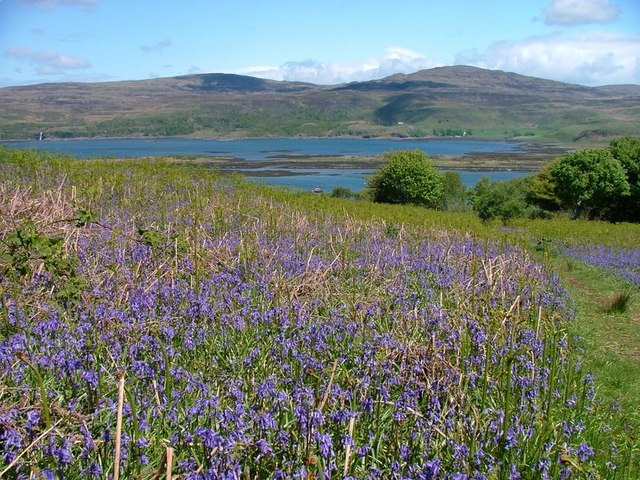
In the west of its range, H. non-scripta lives in open habitats, here on Ulva in the Hebrides, Scotland

Hyacinthoides non-scripta is native to the western parts of Atlantic Europe, from north-western Spain and north-western Portugal, to the Netherlands, Great Britain, and Ireland. It is found in Belgium, Great Britain, France, Ireland, Portugal, the Netherlands and Spain, and also occurs as a naturalized species in Germany, Italy and Romania. It has also been introduced (and can be highly invasive) into various parts of North America, in both the Pacific Northwest (British Columbia, Washington and Oregon), the Great Lakes region (Ontario, New York, Ohio and Pennsylvania) and other parts of the United States (the Virginias, Kentucky and Indiana) it has been introduced as well to New Zealand.

Despite the wide distribution of H. non-scripta, it reaches its greatest densities in Britain and Ireland, where "bluebell woods" (woodland with the understory dominated by H. non-scripta in spring) are a familiar sight. H. non-scripta is found throughout Britain and Ireland, with the exception of the northern Outer Hebrides (Lewis and Harris), Orkney and Shetland, and it is estimated that 25%–50% of all common bluebells may be found in Britain and Ireland.

Bluebells are a species of deciduous woodland over much of their range, flowering and leafing early before the canopy closes in late spring. They may also be found growing under bracken or Japanese knotweed, perennial plants which also form stands with a dense summer canopy. They are most successful on slightly acid soils; the same niche in alkaline conditions may be occupied by other species such as Mercurialis perennis. As a species adapted to woodlands, the young shoots are able to penetrate through a thick layer of leaf litter, and bluebells are often used as an indicator species to identify ancient woodland. Bluebells are also frequently found in hedgerows, and in the west of their range they can be found growing in open habitats, including coastal meadows. Bluebell flowers are rich in pollen and nectar, and are chiefly pollinated by bumblebees, although they are also visited by various other insects. They are a host species for the parasitic fungus Uromyces muscari, which causes bluebell rust. The ability of H. non-scripta to take up phosphorus from the soil is greatly enhanced by the presence of arbuscular mycorrhizae in its roots.

== Protection ==
Hyacinthoides non-scripta is not protected under international law, such as CITES or the EU Habitats Directive.

In the United Kingdom, H. non-scripta is a protected species under the Wildlife and Countryside Act 1981. Landowners are prohibited from removing common bluebells on their land for sale and it is a criminal offence to remove the bulbs of wild common bluebells. This legislation was strengthened in 1998 under Schedule 8 of the Act making any trade in wild common bluebell bulbs or seeds an offence, punishable by fines of up to £5,000 per bulb. The species is not protected in the Isle of Man or the Republic of Ireland.

In France, H. non-scripta is largely confined to the northern half of the country. It is not legally protected at the national level, but it is protected in many of the départements towards the edge of its range (Corrèze, Loiret, Gironde, Lot-et-Garonne, Dordogne, Cher, Eure-et-Loir, Indre-et-Loire and Loir-et-Cher). In Wallonia, H. non-scripta is protected under Annexe VII of the Loi sur la conservation de la nature.

== Uses ==
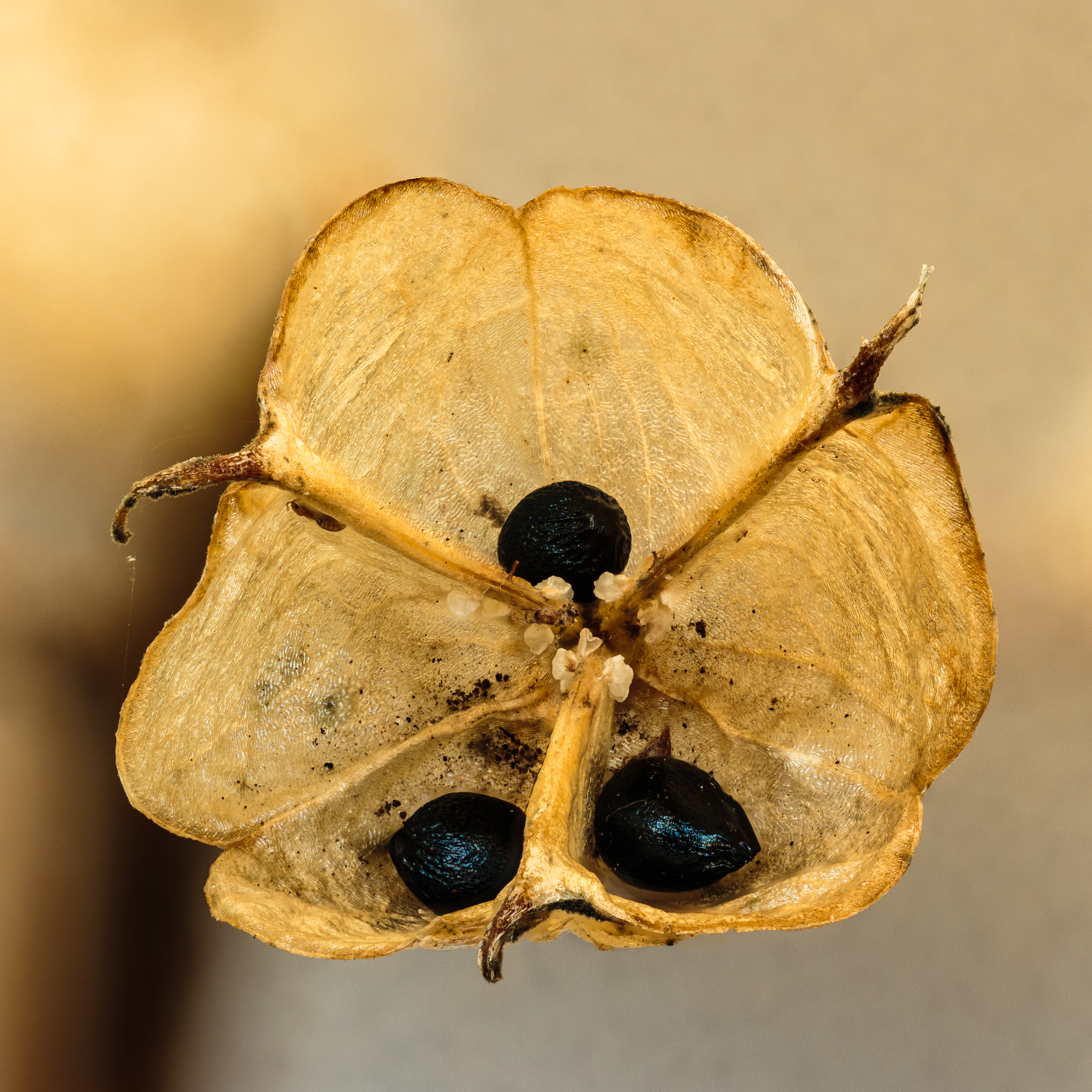
Opened seed pod with seeds inside

Bluebells have had numerous uses over the centuries. There is little evidence of widespread medicinal use, but the bulbs contain mucilage and inulin, a starchy substance which was used as a glue for bookbinding. The Elizabethans also used the starch from the bluebell bulb to stiffen the fabrics of ruffs and collars.

Bluebells are widely planted as garden plants, either among trees or in herbaceous borders. They flower at the same time as hyacinths, Narcissus and some tulips. They produce seed and reproduce vegetatively using bulb offsets, so can spread rapidly, and may need to be controlled as weeds.

In common with other members of their genus, bluebells - particularly their bulbs - are normally considered to be toxic. Bluebells synthesise a wide range of chemicals with potential medicinal properties: they contain at least 15 biologically active compounds that may provide them with protection against insects and animals. Certain extracts – water-soluble pyrrolidine alkaloids – are similar to compounds tested for use in combating HIV and cancer. The bulbs of bluebells are used in folk medicine as a remedy for leucorrhoea, and as a diuretic or styptic, while the sap can be used as an adhesive.

== In culture ==
The bluebell may be regarded as the United Kingdom's "favourite flower". When the wild plant charity Plantlife organised a survey in 2004 to find a favourite flower for each county in the United Kingdom, it decided to ban voters from choosing the bluebell because it had been by far the top choice in an earlier poll for the nation's favourite flower. A stylised bluebell is used as the logo for the Botanical Society of Britain and Ireland.

In and Out the Dusting Bluebells, also known as In and Out the Dusty Bluebells, is a children's playground song and dance.
