= Bluebell wood =

Woodland with a carpet of bluebells

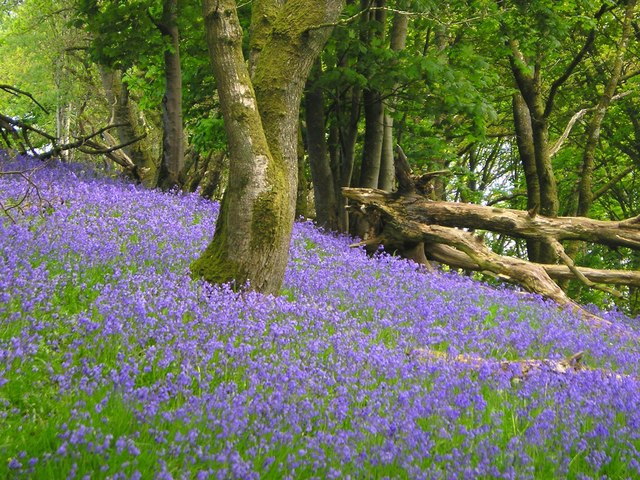
A bluebell wood, near Lampeter in Wales

A bluebell wood is a woodland that in springtime has a carpet of flowering bluebells (Hyacinthoides non-scripta) underneath a newly forming leaf canopy. The thicker the summer canopy, the more the competitive ground-cover is suppressed, encouraging a dense carpet of bluebells, whose leaves mature and die down by early summer. Other common woodland plants which accompany bluebells include the yellow rattle and the wood anemone.

== Locations ==
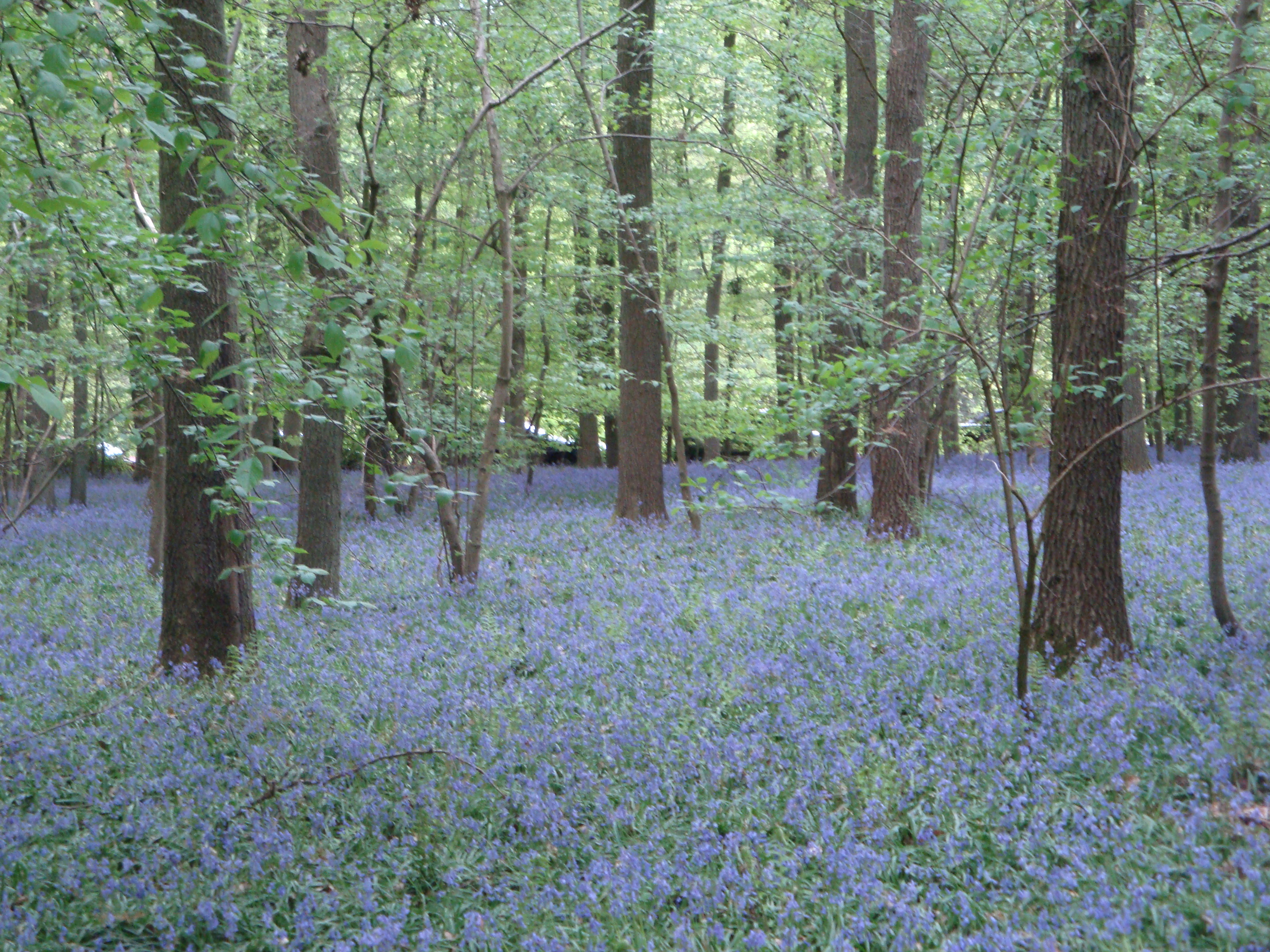
Hallerbos, Belgium

Bluebell woods are found in all parts of Great Britain and Ireland, as well as elsewhere in Europe. Bluebells are a common indicator species for ancient woodlands, so bluebell woods are likely to date back to at least 1600. Some introduced portions of bluebell woods can occur in places where they've been heavily naturalised such as the Pacific Northwest, Mid-Atlantic Region, and British Columbia.

== Literature ==
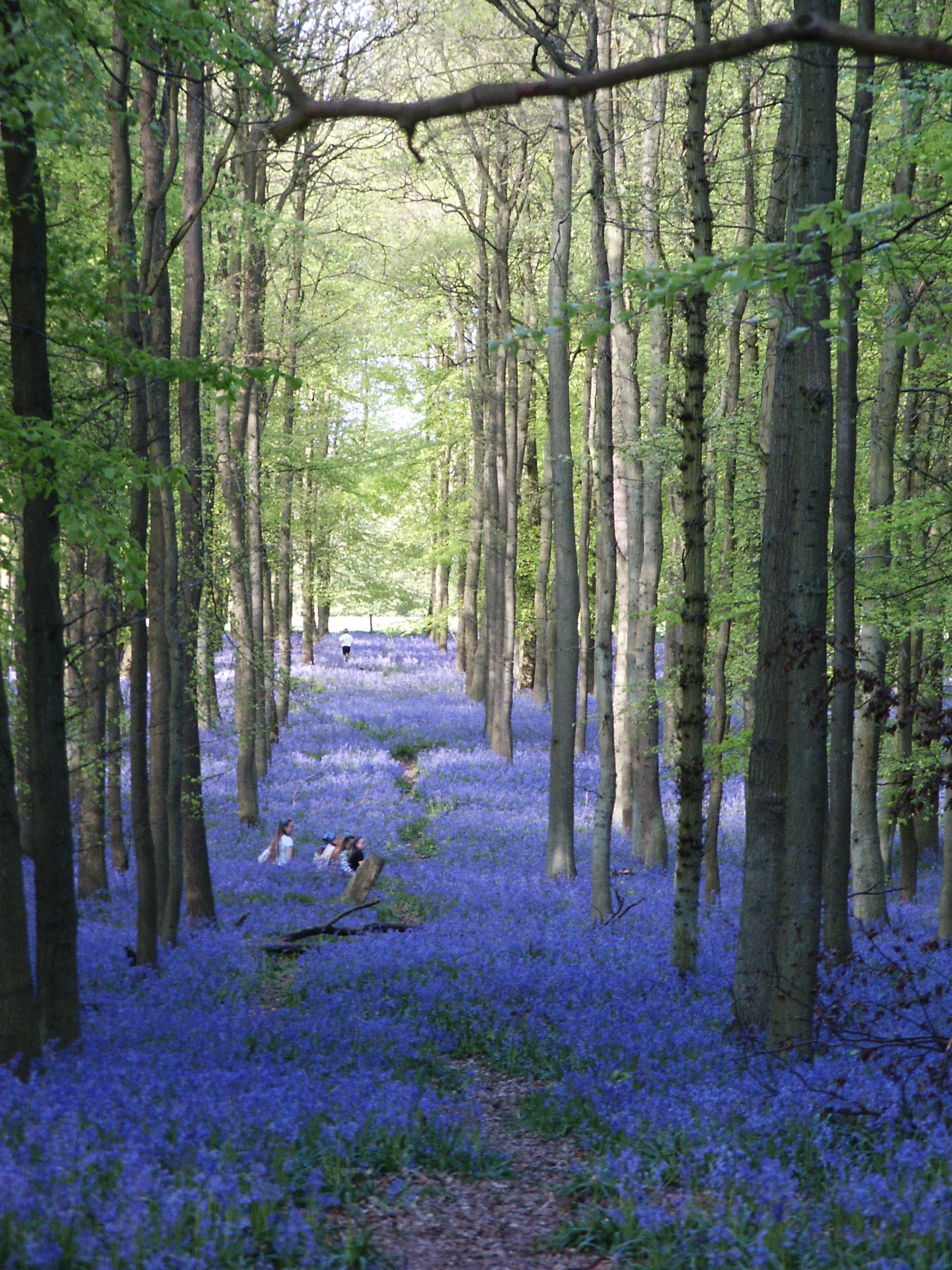
Bluebell wood in May, Buckinghamshire, England

Gerard Manley Hopkins, an English poet, was very keen on the plant as revealed by these lines of his poem "May Magnificat"

And azuring-over greybell makes
Wood banks and brakes wash wet like lakes

In his journal entry for 9 May 1871 Hopkins says:

In the little wood opposite the light they stood in blackish spreads or sheddings like spots on a snake. The heads are then like thongs and solemn in grain and grape-colour. But in the clough through the light they come in falls of sky-colour washing the brows and slacks of the ground with vein-blue, thickening at the double, vertical themselves and the young grass and brake-fern combed vertical, but the brake struck the upright of all this with winged transomes. It was a lovely sight. - The bluebells in your hand baffle you with their inscape, made to every sense. If you draw your fingers through them they are lodged and struggle with a shock of wet heads; the long stalks rub and click and flatten to a fan on one another like your fingers themselves would when you passed the palms hard across one another, making a brittle rub and jostle like the noise of a hurdle strained by leaning against; then there is the faint honey smell and in the mouth the sweet gum when you bite them.

== See also ==
- Ancient woodland
- In and out the Dusting Bluebells - children's rhyme and dance.
