= Dusting Bluebells (rhyme) =

Children's rhyme

In and Out the Dusting Bluebells, also known as In and Out the Dusty or Dusky Bluebells, is a children's playground song and dance. The game is not thought to have formed until the early 20th century and although it enjoyed great popularity amongst girls during the 1960s and 1970s, its popularity had waned by the 2000s.

== Description ==
The children form a circle holding hands with arms raised to form an arch between each child. A child chosen to start the dance begins to weave in and out of the arches singing:-

In and out the dusty bluebells,

In and out the dusty bluebells,

In and out the dusty bluebells,

Who will be my master?

The child stops on the word 'master' and begins to tap on the shoulder of the nearest child in the circle, singing:-

Pitter-patter, pitter-patter on my shoulder,

Pitter-patter, pitter-patter on my shoulder,

Pitter-patter, pitter-patter on my shoulder,

You will be my master.

The tapped child now joins with the dancer and begins to weave through the arches with the original child holding on behind.

The first verse is repeated, until the end, when another child is chosen and tapped upon the shoulders.

This continues until only one child is left of the original circle. The others dance around her and then form a new circle and she becomes the chosen child to start a new cycle.

== Origin ==
The first noting of the rhyme/song is by Alice Gomme in 1898 in her book The Traditional Games of England, Scotland, and Ireland.

The author Karen Maitland has speculated that the song might be a reference to folklore about bluebells, in particular that a bluebell wood in bloom was seen as an enchanted place where fairies lived. A child who picked bluebells alone could be spirited away (mastered) by the fairy folk. Even an adult who ventured into a bluebell wood by themselves was in danger of being led by pixies to wander round and round, unable to find their way out. This folklore may originate in the poisonous nature of the bluebell bulb which can kill if eaten. The children's author, Beatrix Potter, made use of these old superstitions in her only full-length novel for older children, The Fairy Caravan (1929).

Another element is the English tradition of the rural hiring fairs or mop fairs which sometimes took place around the time of year in the spring when bluebells are in bloom. A tap on the shoulder from an employer could be enough to form a contract for the next year's work. There may be an allusion here but most mop fairs were held in the autumn around October. Death was also said to tap his victims on their shoulder as he chose them at random, so there may be an allusion to the plague years.
