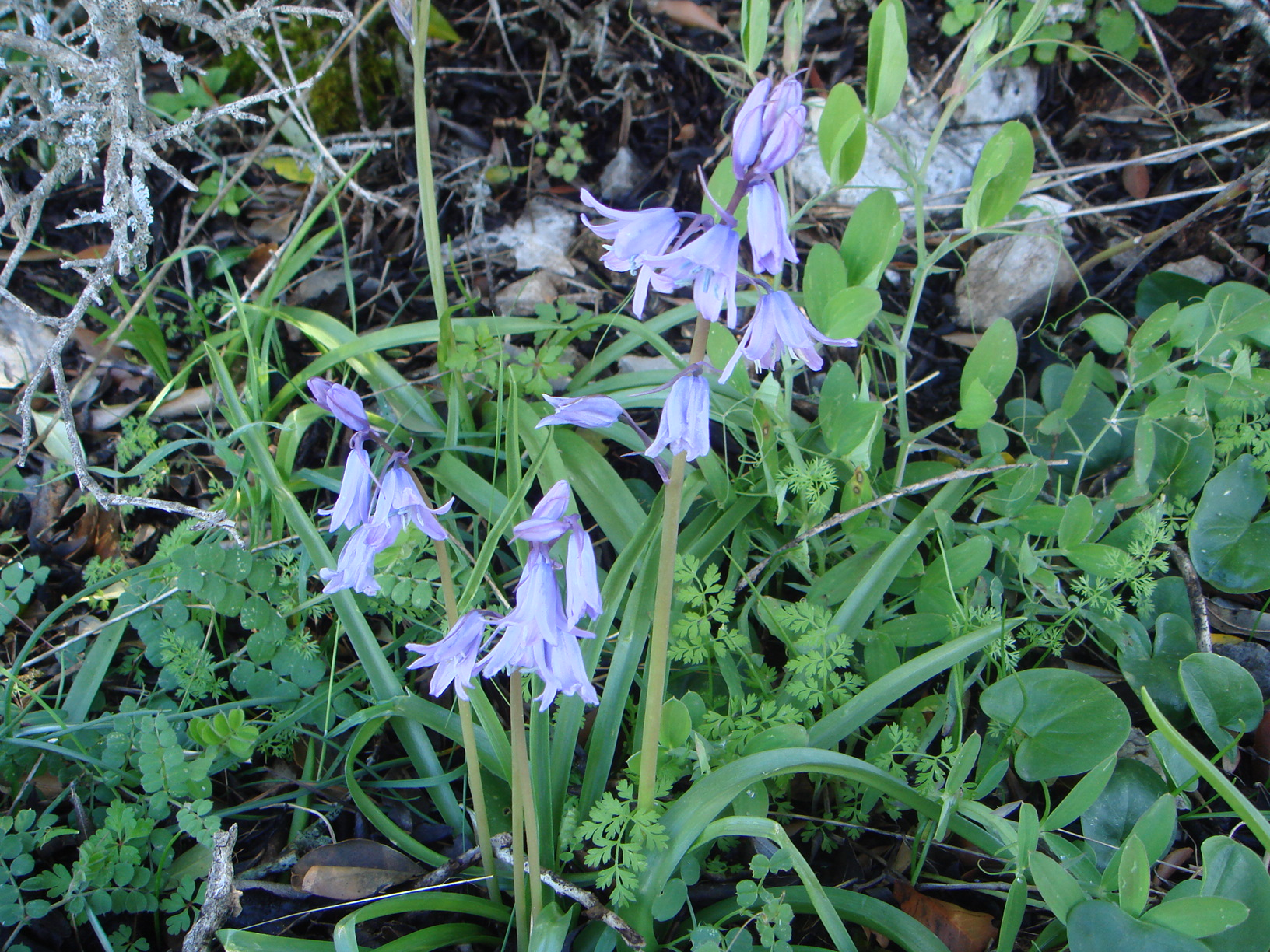

Scientific classification
- Kingdom: Plantae
- Clade: Tracheophytes
- Clade: Angiosperms
- Clade: Monocots
- Order: Asparagales
- Family: Asparagaceae
- Subfamily: Scilloideae
- Genus: Hyacinthoides
- Species: H. hispanica

Binomial name
- Hyacinthoides hispanica (Mill.) Chouard ex Rothm.

Synonyms
- List: Agraphis campanulata (Aiton) Link; Agraphis patula (Desf.) Rchb.; Endymion campanulatus (Aiton) Parl.; Endymion hispanicus (Mill.) Chouard; Endymion patulus (Desf.) Dumort.; Hyacinthoides non-scripta subsp. hispanica (Mill.) Kerguélen; Hyacinthoides patula (Desf.) Rothm.; Hyacinthoides racemosa Medik.; Hyacinthus amethystinus Lam.; Hyacinthus patulus Desf.; Hyacinthus spicatus Moench; Hylomenes campanulata (Aiton) Salisb.; Lagocodes patula (Desf.) Raf.; Scilla campanulata Aiton; Scilla hispanica Mill.; Scilla hyacinthoides Jacq.; Scilla jacquinii J.F.Gmel.; Scilla macrogona Link; Scilla non-scripta subsp. hispanica (Mill.) Ietsw.; Scilla patula (Desf.) DC.; Usteria dispersa Medik.

= Hyacinthoides hispanica =

Species of flowering plant

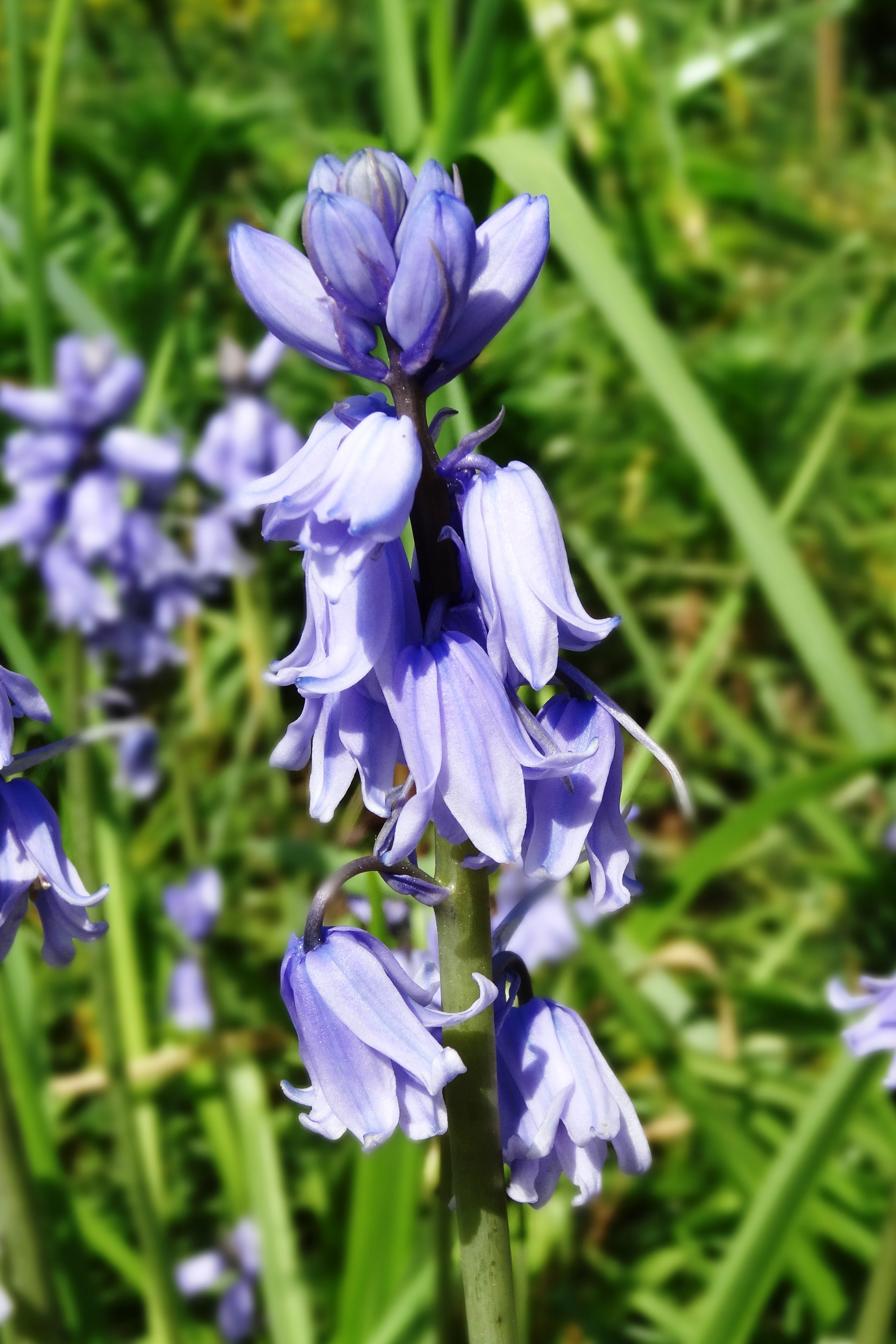
Spanish bluebell - flowers

Hyacinthoides hispanica (syn. Endymion hispanicus or Scilla hispanica), the Spanish bluebell or wood hyacinth, is a spring-flowering bulbous perennial native to the Iberian Peninsula. It is one of around a dozen species in the genus Hyacinthoides, others including the common bluebell (Hyacinthoides non-scripta) in northwestern Europe, and the Italian bluebell (Hyacinthoides italica) further east in the Mediterranean region.

== Description ==
It is distinguished from the common bluebell by its larger, paler, less pendulous blue flowers which do not all droop to one side like the common bluebell; a more erect flower stem (raceme); broader leaves; blue anthers (where the common bluebell has creamy-white ones); and little or no scent, unlike the strong fragrance of the northern species. Like Hyacinthoides non-scripta, it occurs in pink- and white-flowered forms.

== Distribution ==
Hyacinthoides hispanica is native to the western part of the Iberian Peninsula (excluding the far northwest), including Portugal and western Spain. However, it has naturalised and is cultivated in many other European countries, as well as in North America and Australia.

The Spanish bluebell was introduced to the United Kingdom in the late 17th century. Since then, it has frequently hybridised with the native common bluebell, and the resulting hybrids are regarded as invasive. Both the resulting hybrid Hyacinthoides × massartiana and the Spanish bluebell produce highly fertile seed but it is generally the hybrid that invades areas of the native common bluebell. This has caused the common bluebell to be viewed as a threatened species.

The Spanish bluebell is also cultivated as a garden plant, and several named cultivars exist with flowers in various shades of white, pink and blue.
