= Hyacinthoides cedretorum =

Scientific classification
- Kingdom: Plantae
- Clade: Tracheophytes
- Clade: Angiosperms
- Clade: Monocots
- Order: Asparagales
- Family: Asparagaceae
- Subfamily: Scilloideae
- Genus: Hyacinthoides
- Species: H. cedretorum

Binomial name
- Hyacinthoides cedretorum (Pomel) Dobignard

Synonyms
- Endymion cedretorum Pomel; Endymion patulus var. algeriensis Batt.; Scilla kabylica Chabert; Scilla hispanica var. cedretorum (Pomel) Maire; Endymion kabylicus (Chabert) Chouard; Hyacinthoides kabylica (Chabert) Rothm.; Hyacinthoides hispanica subsp. algeriensis (Batt.) Förther & Podlech

Species of flowering plant

Hyacinthoides cedretorum is a species of bluebell that grows in North Africa.

== Description ==
Hyacinthoides cedretorum differs from other species of Hyacinthoides in the strongly revolute (curved backwards) form of the tepals, with the stamens being attached to the tepals only at their bases; in other species, the stamens are fused to the tepals along much of their length, and the tepals form a bell-like shape. The anthers and pollen are typically violet-blue, but populations from the High Atlas mountains have creamy-yellow pollen.

== Distribution and ecology ==
Hyacinthoides cedretorum is found in mountainous areas of Morocco and Algeria, from the Rif Mountains to the mountains of Jijel Province, including the High Atlas and Anti-Atlas mountains. It grows at altitudes of 1,400–1,700 metres (4,600–5,600 ft), generally under Cedrus (cedar) or Abies (fir) trees. In the High Atlas, it grows on exposed cliff ledges.

== Taxonomy and karyology ==
The first description of H. cedretorum as a separate taxon was made by Auguste Pomel in 1874, when he described "Endymion cedretorum" in his work Nouveaux matériaux pour la flore atlantique, based on plants growing on Djebel Endate in Algeria. The same species was later described by Jules Aimé Battandier as "Endymion patulus subsp. algeriensis", and by Alfred Charles Chabert as "Endymion kabylicus". Both Pomel's name and Battandier's name have been treated as infraspecific taxa (subspecies or variety) within the species Hyacinthoides hispanica, but it is now regarded as a separate species, and was placed in the genus Hyacinthoides in 2009.

Hyacinthoides cedretorum is the only tetraploid species in the genus; it is unclear whether it originated by autopolyploidy or allopolyploidy.
