= Pierre Chouard =

French botanist (1903–1983)

Pierre Chouard (Paris, 29 October 1903 - Paris, 11 December 1983) was a French botanist, specialising in plant physiology.

== Biography ==
He entered the École normale supérieure, in the class of 1924, and graduated in natural sciences in 1927.

In 1930, he participated in the formation of the International Mediterranean and Alpine Geobotany Station in Montpellier.

He was professor of plant physiology at the Sorbonne and director of the plant research establishment Phytotron at Gif-sur-Yvette.

In 1962, with his friend Henri Gaussen, he was instrumental in the creation of the Pyrenees National Park. Both went on to be part of the park's Scientific Committee.

He was a member of the Académie d'agriculture de France, a founding member of the Société française de physiologie végétale, and President of the Société botanique de France in 1949–1950. Choard authored some six taxon names, including four in the genus Hyacinthella, Brimeura amethystina and Muscari subg. Moscharia. He is associated with at least thirty.

== Publications ==
- Nouvelles observations sur les éléments floristiques du Massif de Néouvieille et de la Vallée d'Aure, 1933, 4 p.
- La multiplication végétative et le bourgeonnement chez les plantes vasculaires, Hermann & Cie, 1934, 48 p.
- La première excursion botanique interuniversitaire, organisée en Bretagne par l'Université de Rennes (4-7 juin 1938), 1938
- Les Idées modernes sur le mécanisme de la photosynthèse, with Jean Dufrenoy, Henri Jean Maresquelle & André Eichhorn, in Actualités scientifiques et industrielles, Phytobiologia, vol.1, Hermann, 1941, 62 p.
- Alimentation et hygiène en période de restrictions pour les collectivités de jeunesse: lycées, collèges, internats, les Belles éditions, 1943, 24 p.
- Additions à la connaissance floristique des Pyrénées, 1947
- Pourquoi fleurissent les plantes, Palais de la Découverte, 1949, 62 p.
- Éléments de génétique et d'amélioration des plantes, in Cours du Conservatoire national des Arts et métiers, Centre de documentation universitaire, 1951
- La réserve naturelle de Néouvieille dans les Pyrénées centrales, in Travaux du Laboratoire forestier de Toulouse, vol.4, Faculté des sciences, 1953, 6 p.
- Dormances et inhibitions des graines et des bourgeons: préparation au forçage, thermopériodisme, Centre de documentation universitaire, 1954, 157 p.
- Cultures sans sol, Maison Rustique, 1954, 200 p.
- Caractères généraux des Pyrénées centrales entre Gaves et Nestes (Relief, sol, climats, végétation, activités humaines), 1954, 46 p.
- Peut-on rechercher la mise en valeur agricole du Sahara, 1954, 8 p.
- Les gibberellines: nouveaux facteurs de croissance des plantes à fleurs, Persan Beaumont, 1958, 10 p.
- Phytotronique: science, technique, et recherches sur les rapports entre l'environnement et la biologie des végétaux, with N. de Bilderling, Éditions du CNRS, 1969, 111 p.
- Phytotronique et prospective horticole: phytotronique II, symposium for the 18e congrès international de l'horticulture Tel-Aviv organised by P. Chouard and N. de Bilderling, March 1970, compte rendu, Gauthier-Villars, 1972
