= Cyprus Mediterranean forests =

Terrestrial ecoregion in Cyprus

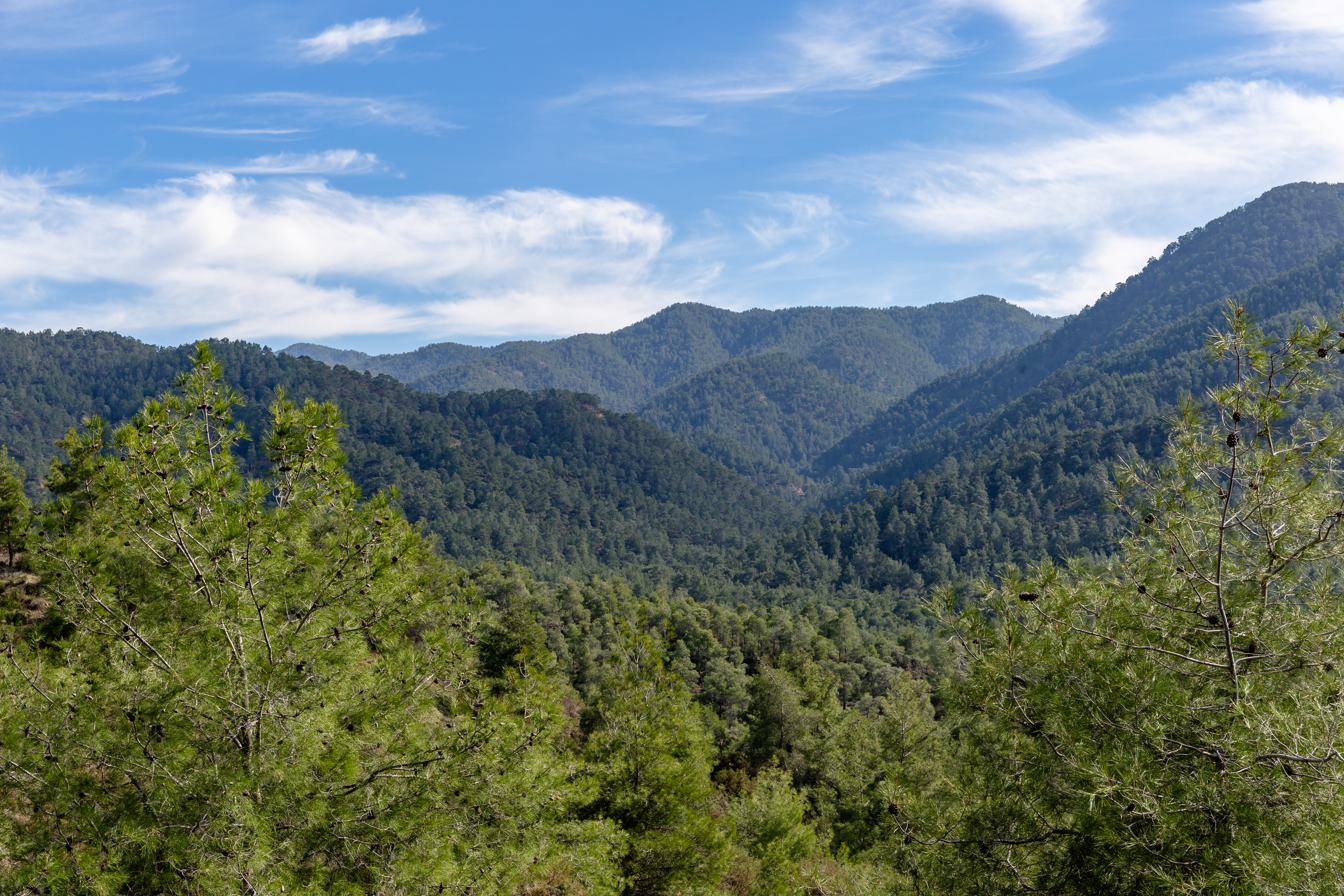
- Paphos forest, Cyprus

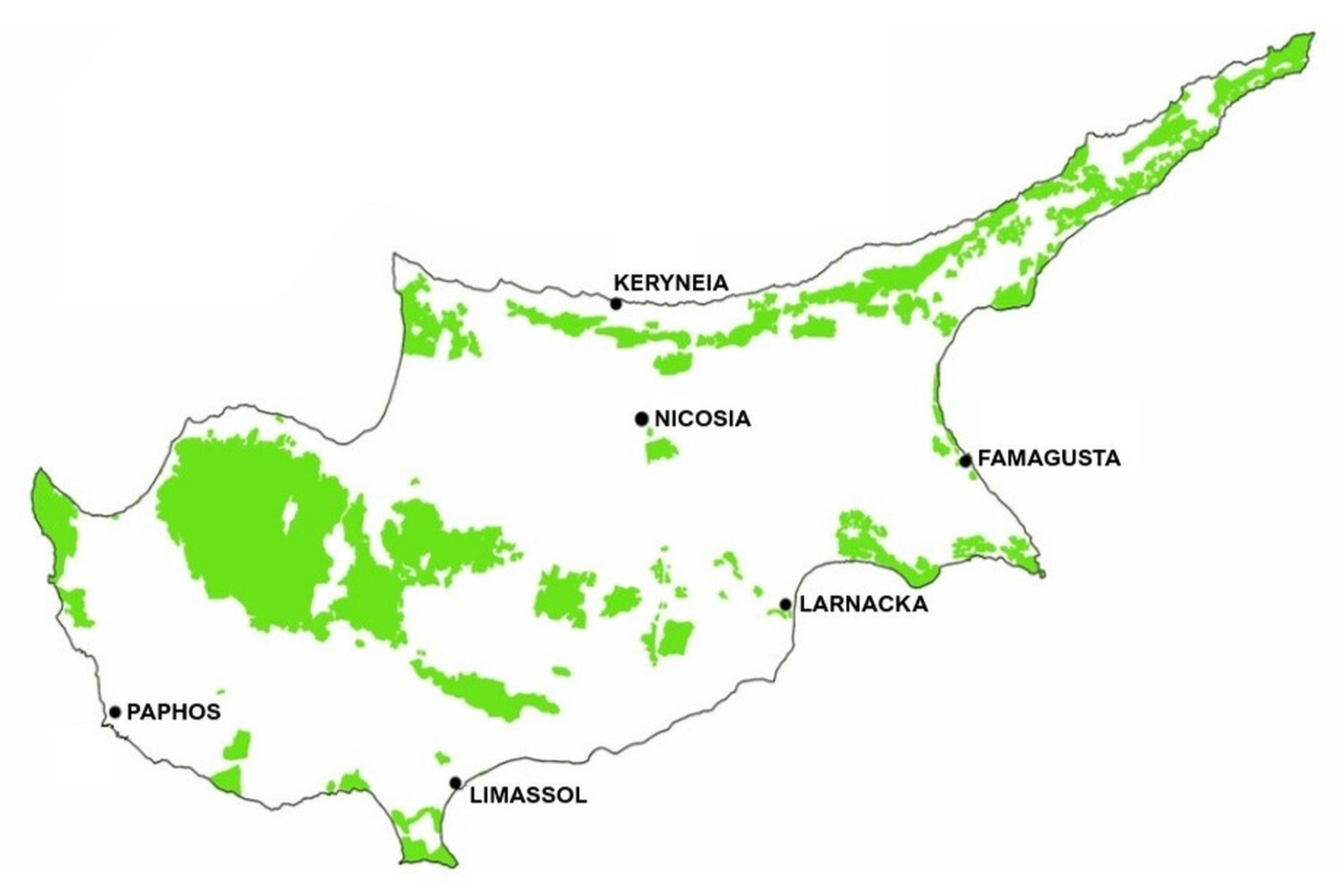
- Map of Cyprus Forests

Ecology
- Realm: Palearctic
- Biome: Mediterranean forests, woodlands, and scrub

Geography
- Area: 9,251 km^{2} (3,572 mi^{2})
- Countries: Cyprus; Akrotiri and Dhekelia (UK overseas territory)
- Elevation: sea level to 1,952 m

Conservation
- Conservation status: critical/endangered

The Cyprus Mediterranean forests is a terrestrial ecoregion that encompasses the island of Cyprus.

The island has a Mediterranean climate, and is in the Mediterranean forests, woodlands, and scrub biome found in the lands in and around the Mediterranean Sea.

== Geography ==
Cyprus lies in the eastern Mediterranean Sea. It is the third-largest island in the Mediterranean, with an area of 9,251 km².

The Troodos Mountains lie in the southwest of the island, and Mount Olympus (aka Chionistra), Cyprus' highest peak, reaches an elevation of 1,952 m. The lower Kyrenia Mountains (aka Pentadaktylos Mountains) run east and west along the island's northeast coast. The Mesaoria lowlands lie in central part of the island between the two ranges.

The Cyprus Forest's cover in total 1,757 km², covering in total 19% of the islands area.

The main forest of Cyprus by forested area are:

1. Paphos Forest — 602.00 km²
2. Adelfoi Forest — 127.55 km²
3. Troodos Forest — 111.28 km²
4. Halevka Forest — 107.15 km²
5. Limassol Forest — 79.26 km²
6. Machairas Forest — 74.89 km²
7. Akamas Forest — 71.48 km²
8. Apostolos Andreas Forest — 52.64 km²
9. Kormakitis Forest — 52.14 km²
10. Buffavento Forest — 48.35 km²
11. Akrades Forest — 22.13 km²
12. Agios Theodoros Forest — 21.42 km²
13. Karpasia Forest — 16.57 km²
14. Agia Napa Forest — 13.98 km²
15. Athalassa Forest — 12.03 km²
16. Oreites Forest — 6.88 km²
17. Trikomo Forest — 4.00 km²
18. Tillyria Forest — 2.66 km²
19. Akrotiri Forest — 1.52 km²
20. Xylofagou Forest — 0.89 km²

== Flora ==
The island's range of topography and soils support diverse plant communities, including mountain conifer and broadleaf forests, open woodlands, grasslands, high shrublands (maquis), and low shrublands (garrigue or phrygana).

There are 1,750 native plant species on the island, of which 128 are endemic. Endemic species are concentrated in the Troodos Mountains (87 species), Kyrenia Mountains (57 species), and Akamas peninsula (35 species).

Two endangered endemic trees, the Cyprus cedar (Cedrus brevifolia) and golden oak or Cyprus oak (Quercus alnifolia), are found only in the Troodos Mountains.

Other endemic species include geophytes such as Scilla lochiae (syn. Chionodoxa lochiae), Crocus cyprius, Crocus veneris, Cyclamen cyprium, Gagea juliae, and Tulipa cypria, and aromatic herbs such as Nepeta italica subsp. troodi (syn. Nepeta troodi), Origanum cordifolium, Salvia willeana, Teucrium cyprium, Teucrium micropodioides, and Thymus integer.

== Fauna ==
The island is home to 36 species of mammals, 26 species of amphibians and reptiles, and 397 species of birds. The Cyprus mouflon (Ovis gmelimi ophion), a subspecies of wild sheep, is endemic to the island. The Cyprus warbler (Curruca melanothorax) and Cyprus wheatear (Oenanthe cypriaca) breed only on Cyprus.

Two sea turtles, the green sea turtle (Chelona mydas) and the loggerhead sea turtle (Caretta caretta), and the endangered Mediterranean monk seal (Monachus monachus) breed on Cyprus' shores.

=== Extinct fauna ===
The extinct Cyprus dwarf elephant (Palaeoloxodon cypriotes), Cyprus dwarf hippopotamus (Hippopotamus minor) once lived on Cyprus. Both species are examples of Insular dwarfism. The cave shelter at Aetokremnos includes remains of dwarf hippos and elephants butchered by humans approximately 11,500 to 12,000 years ago.

== Protected areas ==
752.26 km² of the island's land area is protected. Protected areas in the Republic of Cyprus include seven nature reserves, eleven national forest parks, 13 permanent game reserves, and one turtle nesting beach (Lara-Toxeftra, 1.01 km²). The nature reserves are Chionistra (0.99 km²), Drys Tis Lanias, Kyros Potamos (0.23 km²), Livadhi Tou Pasha (0.26 km²), Madari (11.37 km²), Pikromiloudhi (0.95 km²), and Tripylos - Mavroi Kremmoi (33.31 km²). The national forest parks are Akamas (76.62 km²), Athalassa (8.71 km²), Ayios Nikadros (0.26 km²), Kavo Gkreko (5.0 km²), Pedagogiki Akademia (0.45 km²), Petra Tou Romiou (3.51 km²), Polemidia (1.27 km²), Potamos Liopetriou (0.88 km²), and Troodos (90.62 km²).

In 2015, Troodos UNESCO Global Geopark was created in the Troodos Mountains, with an area of 1149.8 km². It encompasses most of the Troodos range, including several smaller protected areas.
