= Akamas =

Promontory and cape at the northwest extremity of Cyprus

Coordinates: 35.04°N 32.32°E

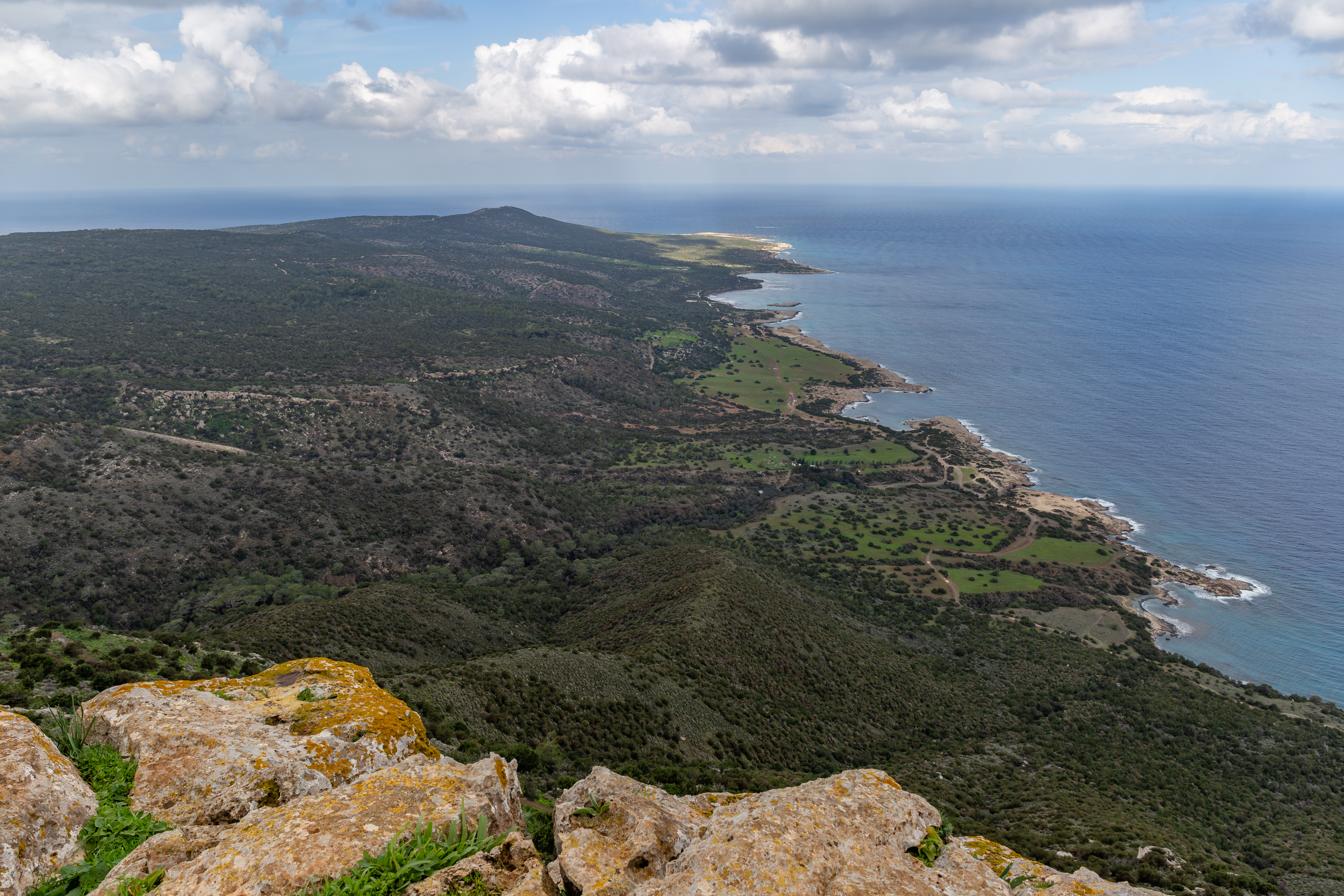
View from Moutti Tis Sotiras towards the cape

Akamas (Greek: Ακάμας, Turkish: Akama), is a promontory and cape at the northwest extremity of Cyprus with an area of 230 square kilometres. Ptolemy described it as a thickly wooded headland, divided into two by summits (a mountain range) rising towards the north. The peninsula is named after Akamas, a son of Theseus, hero of the Trojan War and founder of the city-kingdom of Soli.

Until the year 2000, the peninsula was used by the British Army and Navy for military exercises and as a firing range. Under the 1960 Treaty of Establishment, the British Army was allowed to use the Akamas for exercises for up to 70 days a year.

At the southern end of the peninsula is the town of Pegeia and on its northeast side the town of Polis. Due to the mountainous nature of the peninsula there are no roads running through its heartland. Furthermore, some roads marked on Cypriot road maps of the area are not sealed. Visitor attractions in Akamas include a loggerhead turtle sanctuary and the Baths of Aphrodite where the goddess is said to have bathed, near Polis.

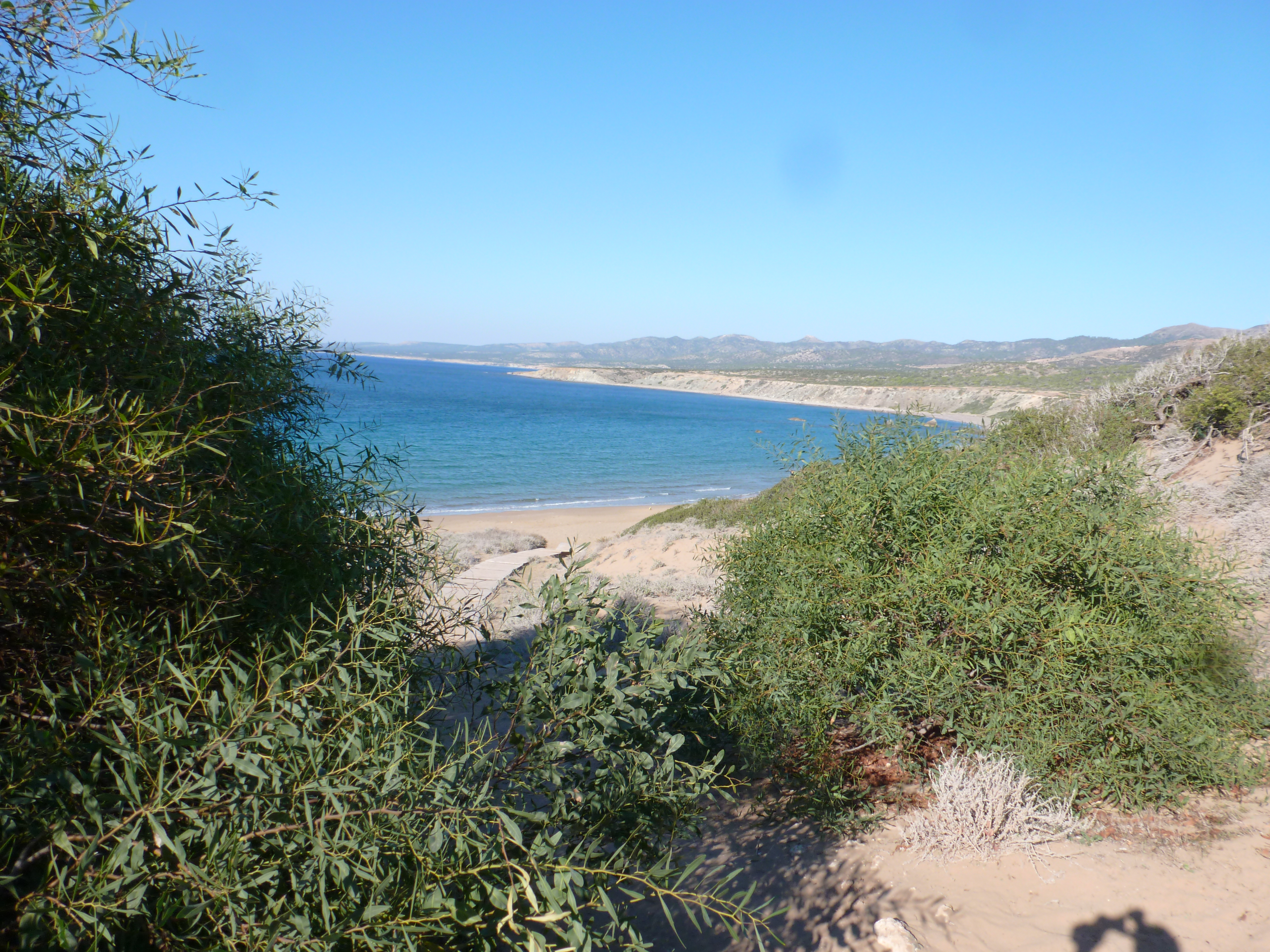
Akamas - Lara Beach

== Protected status ==
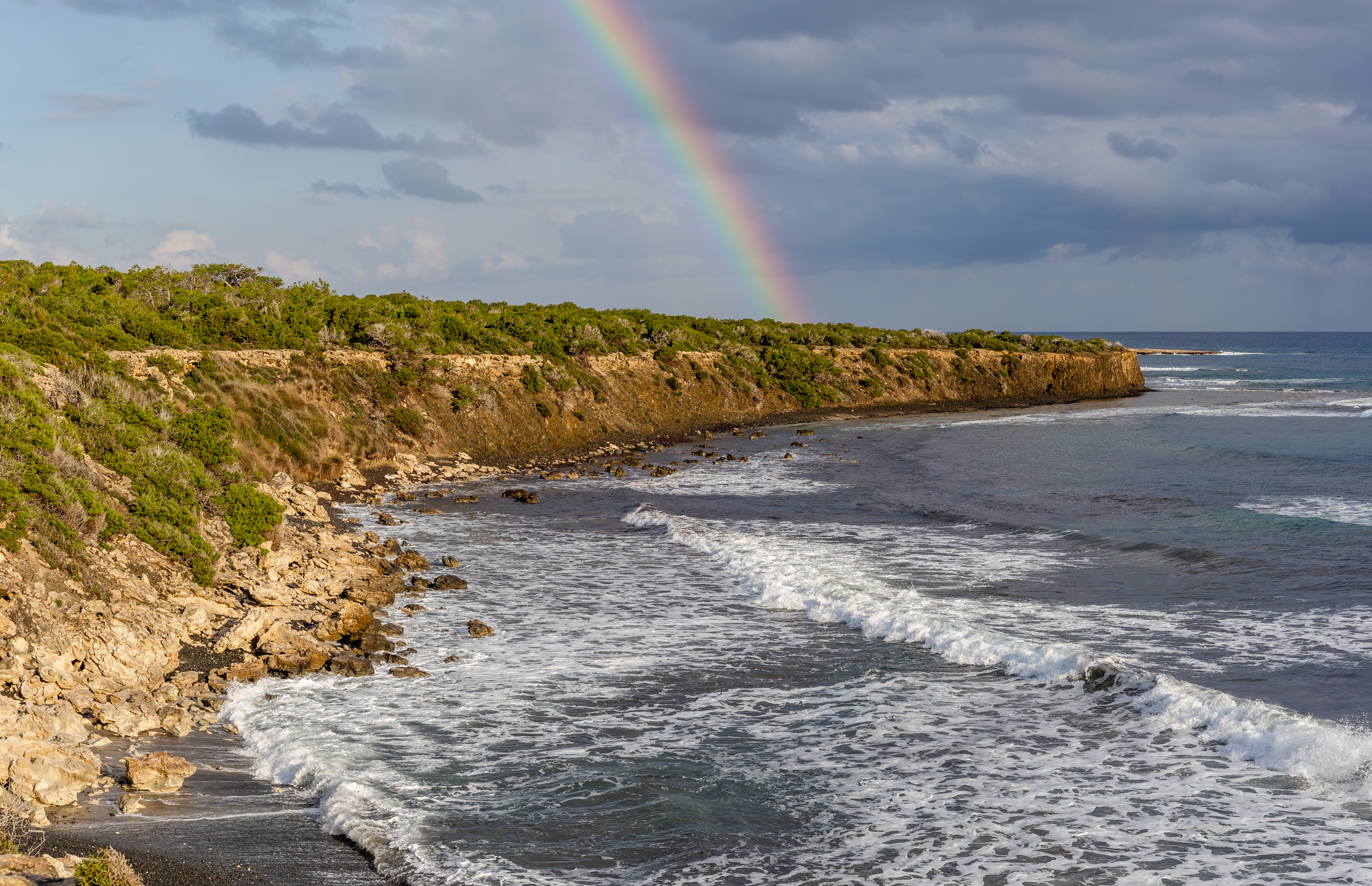
A rocky coast of the peninsula

As the area is relatively inaccessible, there is a large diversity of flora and fauna there. Indeed, the European Environment Agency noted that it was one of only 22 areas of endemism in Europe.

In preparation for the accession of Cyprus to the European Union most of Akamas was proposed to be given protected status. Two turtle-nesting beaches were designated Sites of Community Importance within the Natura 2000 network, the Polis-Gialia area became a Special Area of Conservation, and the peninsula was designated a Special Protection Area for birds. However, of the terrestrial area of Akamas proposed as a Natura 2000 area in 2003, only 50% was so designated by the government of Cyprus in 2009. The area is threatened by tourist development and the planned A7 motorway between Polis and Paphos, and the government is under pressure to enhance the peninsula's protection. Organisations such as the Green Party of Cyprus, Greenpeace and Friends of the Earth are taking action to protect the area.

== Biology and ecology ==
Akamas supports a wide diversity of life including many vulnerable species, some of which are endemic to Akamas. Wild flowers include cyclamen, turban buttercups, alyssum (Alyssum akamasicum, endemic to Akamas), Cyprus tulip, and many species of orchid, yellow gorse and white rock rose.

The following 39 of the 128 endemic plant species of Cyprus are found in the Akamas peninsula: Alyssum akamasicum, Anthemis tricolor, Arenaria rhodia ssp. cypria, Asperula cypria, Astragalus cyprius, Ballota integrefolia, Bosea cypria, Carlina involucrata spp. cyprica, Carlina pygmea, Centaurea akamantis, Centaurea calcitrapa ssp. angusticeps, Centaurea veneris, Crocus veneris, Cyclamen cyprium, Euphorbia cypria, Gagea juliae, Gladiolus triphyllus, Helianthemum obtusefolium, Odontites cypria, Onobrychis venosa, Onopordum cyprium, Onosma fruticosa, Ophrys kotschyi, Ophrys lepethica, Origanum majorana, Ornithogalum pedicellare, Phlomis cypria var. occidentalis, Pterocephalus multiflorus ssp. multiflorus, Ptilostemon chamaepeuce var. cyprius, Rubia laurea, Scutellaria cypria var. elatior, Sedum cyprium, Sedum porphyreum, Senecio glaucus ssp. cyprius, Taraxacum aphrogenes, Teucrium divaricatum ssp. canescens, Teucrium micropodioides, Thymus integer, Tulipa cypria.

Animals found in Akamas include fruit bats, shrews, hedgehogs, foxes, snakes, lizards, griffon vultures, Cyprus warblers, and Cyprus scops owls. Vulnerable species include bats, monk seals and sea turtles. At Lara Bay there is a turtle hatchery, where the eggs are protected.

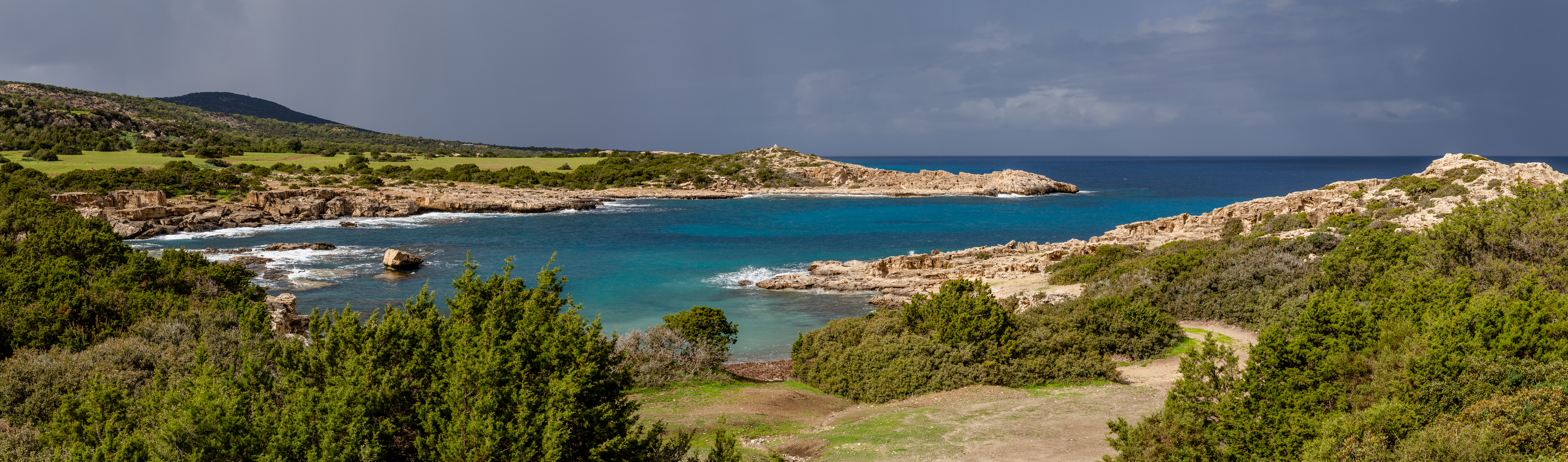
Amphitheatre Bay in Akamas peninsula

== Akamas in local and popular culture ==
The British broadcaster and naturalist, Sir David Attenborough has filmed at Akamas. The film Akamas, which premiered at the Venice Film Festival was mostly filmed in Akamas. In Greek mythology, it is where Aphrodite met her lover, Adonis and some natural landmarks have associations with this tale, for example Fontana Amorosa (Love’s Spring), near Polis, is said to be Aphrodite’s Fountain of Love and anyone who drinks from the spring is said to become overcome with youthful desire.

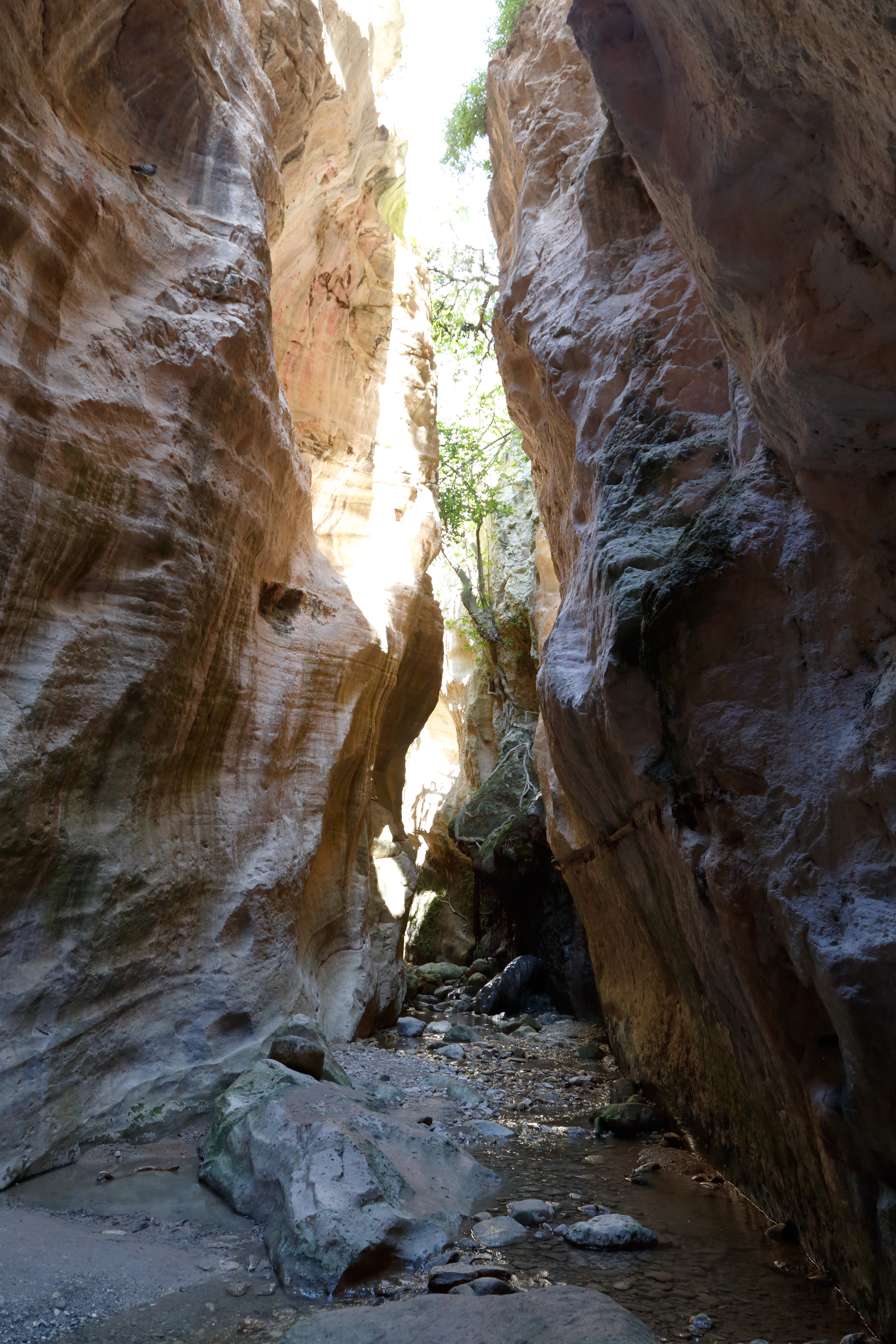
Avakas Gorge

== Gorges ==
The Androlykou Gorge and Petratis Gorge, both on the northern side of Akamas may be seen from the village of Androlykou. On the south westerly side the Avakas Gorge has high sheer cliffs which come closer together until they meet, leaving a tunnel formation through which a stream runs.

== Tourism ==
Akamas has branded itself as an exclusive destination and tourists who come tend to be seeking more than "sun, sea and sand", being more interested in culture, biodiversity and specialist sports such as golf or hiking.

== Repeated arson ==
In 2019, several fires broke out by simultaneous arson attacks. Six aircraft from the National Guard, the Police and the Forestry Department, were deployed. The fires were extinguished nine hours after they broke out. The head of the forestry department Charalambos Alexandrou called the arsonists ‘senseless’ as they were calculating the scale of the damage. “Whenever a meeting is planned to discuss Akamas, the day before a fire breaks out in the area,” he said. Following the fires, Save Akamas, Save Cyprus organisation protested with the slogan ‘Hands off Akamas’. Since 2017, arsonists have set approximately 80 fires in or around the National Forest Park, they said. “The state is at best tolerating and at worst encouraging such criminal behaviour.” Agriculture Minister Costas Kadis said that economic interests are behind fires that were deliberately set in a bid to sabotage plans to declare the area as a National Forest by 2022. He made clear that the 'Akamas National Forest' plan remains on track.
