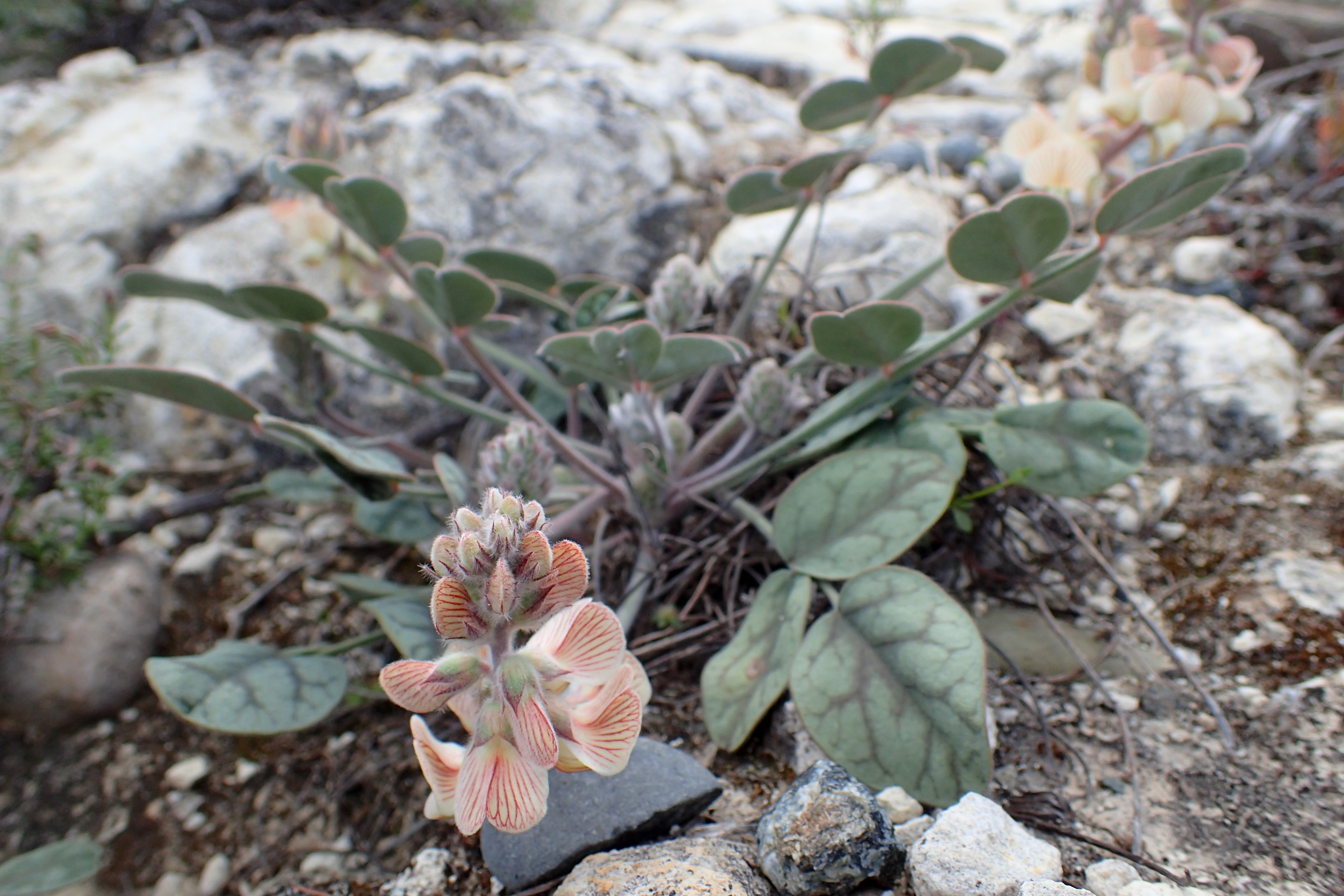

Scientific classification
- Kingdom: Plantae
- Clade: Tracheophytes
- Clade: Angiosperms
- Clade: Eudicots
- Clade: Rosids
- Order: Fabales
- Family: Fabaceae
- Subfamily: Faboideae
- Genus: Onobrychis
- Species: O. venosa

Binomial name
- Onobrychis venosa Desv.

= Onobrychis venosa =

Species of legume

Onobrychis venosa, veined sainfoin is a perennial, spreading or suberect herb 10–25 cm high, with a short stem. Leaves alternate, compound, imparipinnate, leaflets ovoid to suborbicular 10-40 x 5–30 mm with characteristic bronze venation (hence venosa), hairy only along margins. Zygomorphic flowers with yellow petals with conspicuous dark-red nerves in axillary racemes. Flowers from February to May. The fruit is a circular flattened hairy pod.

== Habitat ==
Habitat usually on dry hillsides on limestone but also on igneous formations or near the coast, from sea level to 950 m.

== Distribution ==
Endemic to and common in many parts of Cyprus: Akamas, Panayia, Petra tou Romiou, Moni, Agios Therapon, Kosshi, Yeri, Latsia, Athalassa, Mitsero, Agrokipia, Klirou, Potami, Pendataktylos, Karpasia.
