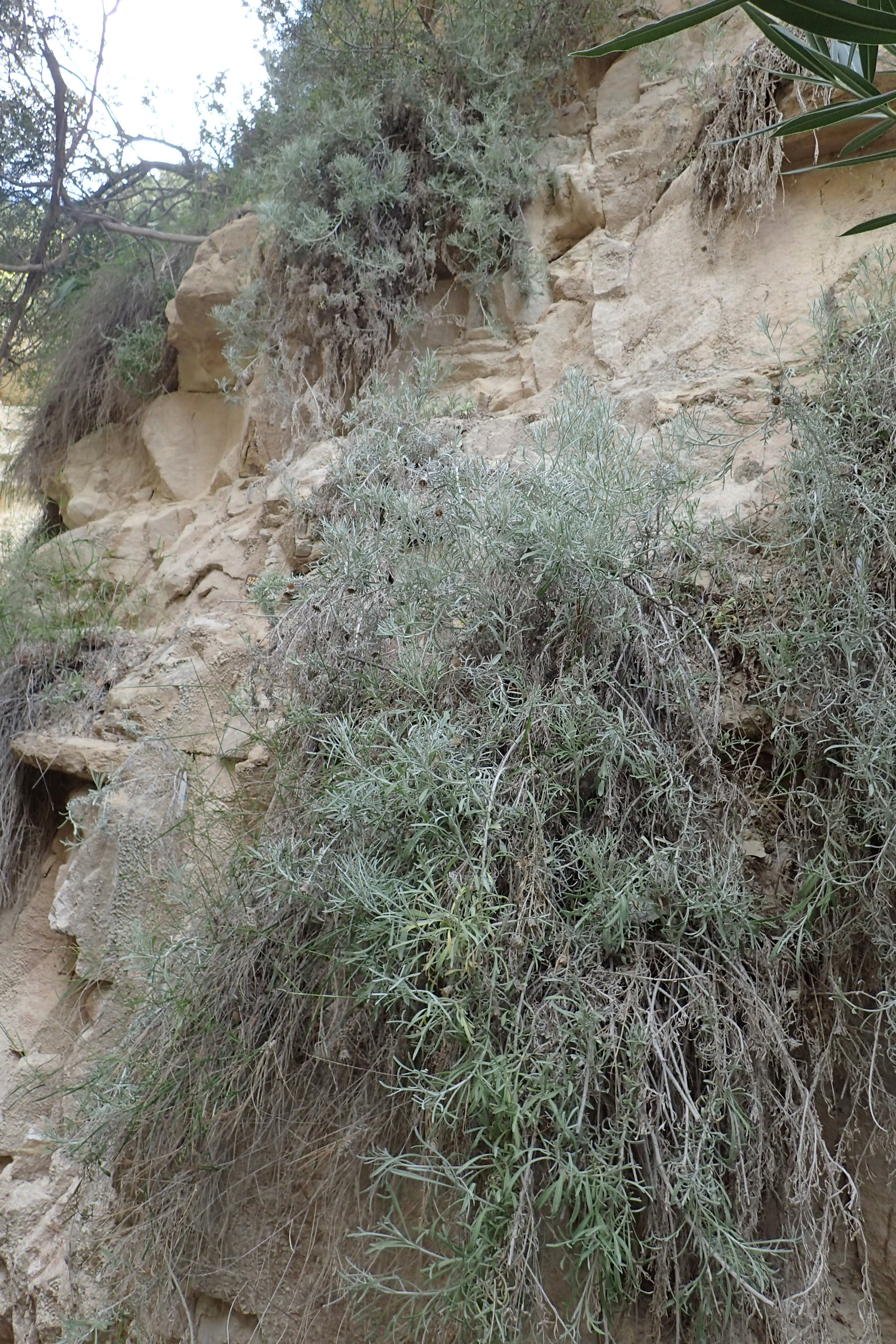

Conservation status
- Critically Endangered (IUCN 3.1)

Scientific classification
- Kingdom: Plantae
- Clade: Tracheophytes
- Clade: Angiosperms
- Clade: Eudicots
- Clade: Asterids
- Order: Asterales
- Family: Asteraceae
- Genus: Centaurea
- Species: C. akamantis

Binomial name
- Centaurea akamantis T.Georgiadis & G.Chatzikyriakou

= Centaurea akamantis =

Species of flowering plant

Centaurea akamantis, the Akamas centaurea, is a species of flowering plant in the family Asteraceae. It is endemic to Cyprus, where it is found in three localities on the Akamas Peninsula in western Cyprus. Its total range measures around seven square kilometres, of which less than one square kilometre is inhabited by the plant. The species inhabits steep, shaded, humid limestone cliffs that have other vegetation growing in the crevices. It is listed as being critically endangered on the IUCN Red List due to its small range and population, as well as declining habitat quality in its range. The population of the species is estimated to number around 800 plants. The species is protected under Appendix I of the Berne Convention and Annexes II and IV of the Habitats Directive.

== Taxonomy ==
It was first published and described in Willdenowia Vol.23 on page 157 in 1993.

== Description ==
The species is a semi-woody herbaceous plant with drooping shoots, which can be up to 60 centimeters long. The alternate leaves are compound and are divided either once or twice. The greyish-green leaflets are linear or spear-shaped, between 1 and 5 millimeters wide, and covered with white matted hair. The small purple-mauve flowers are densely grouped in terminal flower heads that resemble large solitary flowers. The outer flowers bear a single large petal, while the inner flowers are tubular. The achenes looks like the seeds of wheat and have a lot of fine hair.

== Distribution and habitat ==
The Akamas centaurea is endemic to Cyprus, where it is found in three localities on the Akamas Peninsula in western Cyprus. The three localities are the Avakas, Koufon, and Falkonias gorges. Its total range measures around seven square kilometres, of which less than one square kilometre is inhabited by the plant.

The species inhabits steep, shaded, humid limestone cliffs that have other vegetation growing in the crevices. it is found at elevations of 70–150 m.

== Ecology ==
The Akamas centaurea has a very long flowering and fruiting period. The bloom period is between the months of May and November. The fruiting period is between the months of July to December.

== Conservation ==
The Akamas centaurea is listed as being critically endangered on the IUCN Red List due to its small range and population, as well as declining habitat quality in its range. Surveys of the species in 2005 and 2009 estimated the population to number 550 and 590 individuals respectively. Following the discovery of a new subpopulation in 2012, a 2013 study increased the population estimate to around 800 plants. Illegal grazing by goats poses a severe threat to the Akamas centaurea, leading to erosion and trampling of plants. However, this is only a threat to a small part of the species' overall population which is accessible to goats. Another threat is soil erosion due to landslides and rockfalls, a problem the species is vulnerable due to the geological features of the gorges it grows in.

The species is protected under Appendix I of the Berne Convention and Annexes II and IV of the Habitats Directive. It is also recognised as an endangered species in Cyprus. The Akamas Peninsula is a protected area under the Natura 2000 program and Avakas Gorge, which hosts the largest subpopulation of the species, is a Natural Micro-Reserve under Cypriot law. The Akamas centaurea is also a subject of ex-situ conservation measures, having been grown at the Cyprus Agricultural Research Institute and the Royal Botanic Gardens, Kew. CARI and other universities also store seeds of the plant at their seed banks.
