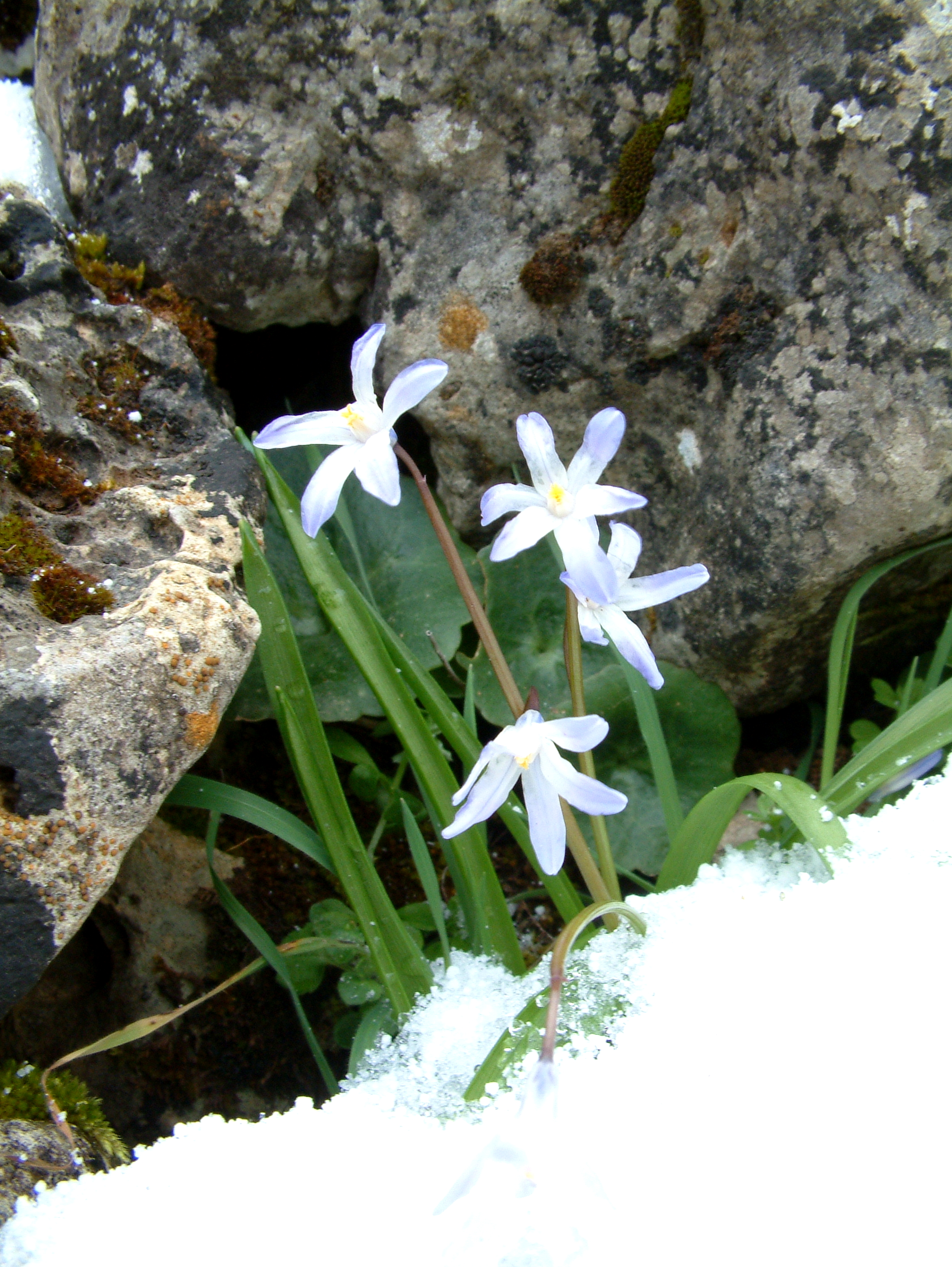

Scientific classification
- Kingdom: Plantae
- Clade: Tracheophytes
- Clade: Angiosperms
- Clade: Monocots
- Order: Asparagales
- Family: Asparagaceae
- Subfamily: Scilloideae
- Genus: Scilla
- Section: Scilla sect. Chionodoxa
- Species: S. nana

Binomial name
- Scilla nana (Schult. & Schult.f.) Speta

Synonyms
- Chionodoxa albescens (Speta) Rix; Chionodoxa cretica Jaub. & Spach, nom. illeg.; Chionodoxa nana (Schult. & Schult.f.) Boiss. & Heldr.; Hyacinthus nanus Schult. & Schult.f; Puschkinia scilloides Sieber, nom. illeg.; Scilla albescens Speta; Scilla nana subsp. albescens (Speta) Speta

= Scilla nana =

Species of flowering plant

Scilla nana, known as dwarf glory-of-the-snow, is a bulbous perennial flowering plant endemic to Crete. It flowers in early spring with flowers in shades of lilac blue. After flowering, it goes into dormancy until the next spring. It belongs to a group of Scilla species that were formerly put in a separate genus, Chionodoxa, and may now be treated as Scilla sect. Chionodoxa. It has not always been recognized as distinct from Scilla cretica.

== Description ==
Like all members of Scilla sect. Chionodoxa, the bases of the stamens of Scilla nana are flattened and closely clustered in the middle of the flower. In other species of Scilla, the stamens are not flattened or clustered together.

S. nana (like S. cretica) has two leaves per bulb, and at most one flowering stem, with one to five (more commonly three) flowers in a loose raceme. Individual flowers are up to 2.4 cm diameter with tepals up to 1.1 cm long, most facing upwards, the overall colour effect being some shade of lilac-blue. Sfikas distinguishes between smaller plants with whitish flowers occurring above 1700 m, S. nana, and larger plants with bluer flowers occurring below 1700 m, S. cretica.

S. nana subsp. albescens (synonym S. albescens) is recognized by some sources, although not by others. It has slightly smaller flowers (tepals up to 1 cm long), whitish with lavender to violet-blue tips. It was awarded the RHS Award of Garden Merit (H4 – hardy outdoors anywhere in the British Isles) in 2004, subject to availability.

== Taxonomy ==
Scilla nana was first described in 1829, as Hyacinthus nana, by Josef August Schultes and Julius Hermann Schultes. It was transferred to Chionodoxa in 1854. Chionodoxa was separated from Scilla partly on the basis of the flattened stamen bases. Phylogenetic studies showed that Chionodoxa was nested within Scilla. Former Chionodoxa species may now be treated as Scilla sect. Chionodoxa.

Plants occurring in Crete have at one time or another been put into one of three species (in either Scilla or Chionodoxa): S. albescens Speta, S. cretica (Boiss. & Heldr.) Speta and S. nana (Schult. & Schult.f.) Speta. Sfikas' Wild flowers of Crete recognized only two of these (in Chionodoxa as C. cretica and C. nana); the Natural History Museum's checklist of the Cretan Flora recognized only one (S. nana). As of March 2020, the World Checklist of Selected Plant Families accepts both S. nana and S. cretica.

== Distribution and habitat ==
Scilla nana is endemic to Crete, where it occurs at elevations of 1700–2300 m.

== See also ==
- List of Scilla species

== Bibliography ==
- Beckett, Kenneth; Grey-Wilson, Christopher, eds. (1993), Alpine Garden Society Encyclopaedia of Alpines, Vol. 1 (A-K), Pershore, UK: AGS Publications, ISBN 978-0-900048-63-0
- Dashwood, Melanie & Mathew, Brian (2005), Hyacinthaceae – little blue bulbs (RHS Plant Trials and Awards, Bulletin Number 11), Royal Horticultural Society, archived from the original on 28 August 2015* Mathew, Brian (1987), The Smaller Bulbs, London: B T Batsford, ISBN 978-0-7134-4922-8
- Mathew, Brian (2005), "Hardy Hyacinthaceae, Part 2: Scilla, Chionodoxa, xChionoscilla", The Plantsman, New Series, 4 (2): 110–21
- Sfikas, George (1987), Wild Flowers of Crete, Athens: Efstathiadis, ISBN 978-960-226-052-4
- Turland, N.J.; Chilton, L.; Press, J.R & Natural History Museum (London) (1993), Flora of the Cretan Area: annotated checklist and atlas, London: HMSO, ISBN 978-0-11-310043-9
- Yildirim, H.; Yetisen, K.; Özdemir, A. & Özdemir, C. (2017), "An Anatomical Study of Scilla (Scilloideae) Section Chionodoxa and Scilla bifolia in Turkey" (PDF), Planta Daninha, 35: e017162495, doi:10.1590/s0100-83582017350100004
