= Scilla cretica =

Scientific classification
- Kingdom: Plantae
- Clade: Embryophytes
- Clade: Tracheophytes
- Clade: Spermatophytes
- Clade: Angiosperms
- Clade: Monocots
- Order: Asparagales
- Family: Asparagaceae
- Subfamily: Scilloideae
- Genus: Scilla
- Section: Scilla sect. Chionodoxa
- Species: S. cretica

Binomial name
- Scilla cretica (Boiss. & Heldr.) Speta

Synonyms
- Chionodoxa cretica Boiss. & Heldr., non Jaub. & Spach, nom. illeg.; Hyacinthus creticus (Boiss. & Heldr.) Nyman

Species of flowering plant

Scilla cretica is a species of flowering plant in the Asparagaceae family. It is referred to by the common name Cretan glory-of-the-snow, and is a bulbous perennial native to Crete, flowering in early spring. It belongs to a group of Scilla species that were formerly put in a separate genus, Chionodoxa, and may now be treated as Scilla sect. Chionodoxa. It has not always been recognized as distinct from Scilla nana.

== Description ==
Like all members of the former genus Chionodoxa, the bases of the stamens are flattened and closely clustered in the middle of the flower. In other species of Scilla, the stamens are not flattened or clustered together.

== Taxonomy ==
The number of related species recognized as occurring in Crete has varied. In 1987, Sfikas' Wild flowers of Crete recognized two (then placed in Chionodoxa), C. cretica and C. nana. In 1993, the Natural History Museum's checklist of the Cretan Flora recognized only Scilla nana. As of March 2020, the World Checklist of Selected Plant Families accepted both S. cretica and S. nana. Sfikas regards S. cretica as being larger, with bluer flowers, occurring below 1,700 m (5,600 ft) and S. nana as smaller, with whitish flowers, occurring above 1,700 m.

== Distribution and habitat ==
Scilla cretica is native to Crete where it is found at elevations of 1,300–1,700 m (4,300–5,600 ft).

== Bibliography ==
- Mathew, Brian (1987), The Smaller Bulbs, London: B T Batsford, ISBN 978-0-7134-4922-8
- Mathew, Brian (2005), "Hardy Hyacinthaceae, Part 2: Scilla, Chionodoxa, xChionoscilla", The Plantsman, New Series, 4 (2): 110–21
- Sfikas, George (1987), Wild Flowers of Crete, Athens: Efstathiadis, ISBN 978-960-226-052-4
- Turland, N.J.; Chilton, L.; Press, J.R & Natural History Museum (London) (1993), Flora of the Cretan Area: annotated checklist and atlas, London: HMSO, ISBN 978-0-11-310043-9
- Yildirim, H.; Yetisen, K.; Özdemir, A. & Özdemir, C. (2017), "An Anatomical Study of Scilla (Scilloideae) Section Chionodoxa and Scilla bifolia in Turkey" (PDF), Planta Daninha, 35: e017162495, doi:10.1590/s0100-83582017350100004
