= Fontana Amorosa =

Fresh water pool on the Akamas Peninsula, Cyprus

Fontana Amorosa is a fresh water pool associated with Aphrodite, goddess of love, on the Akamas Peninsula, near Polis, 48 kilometres north of the city of Paphos, Cyprus.
