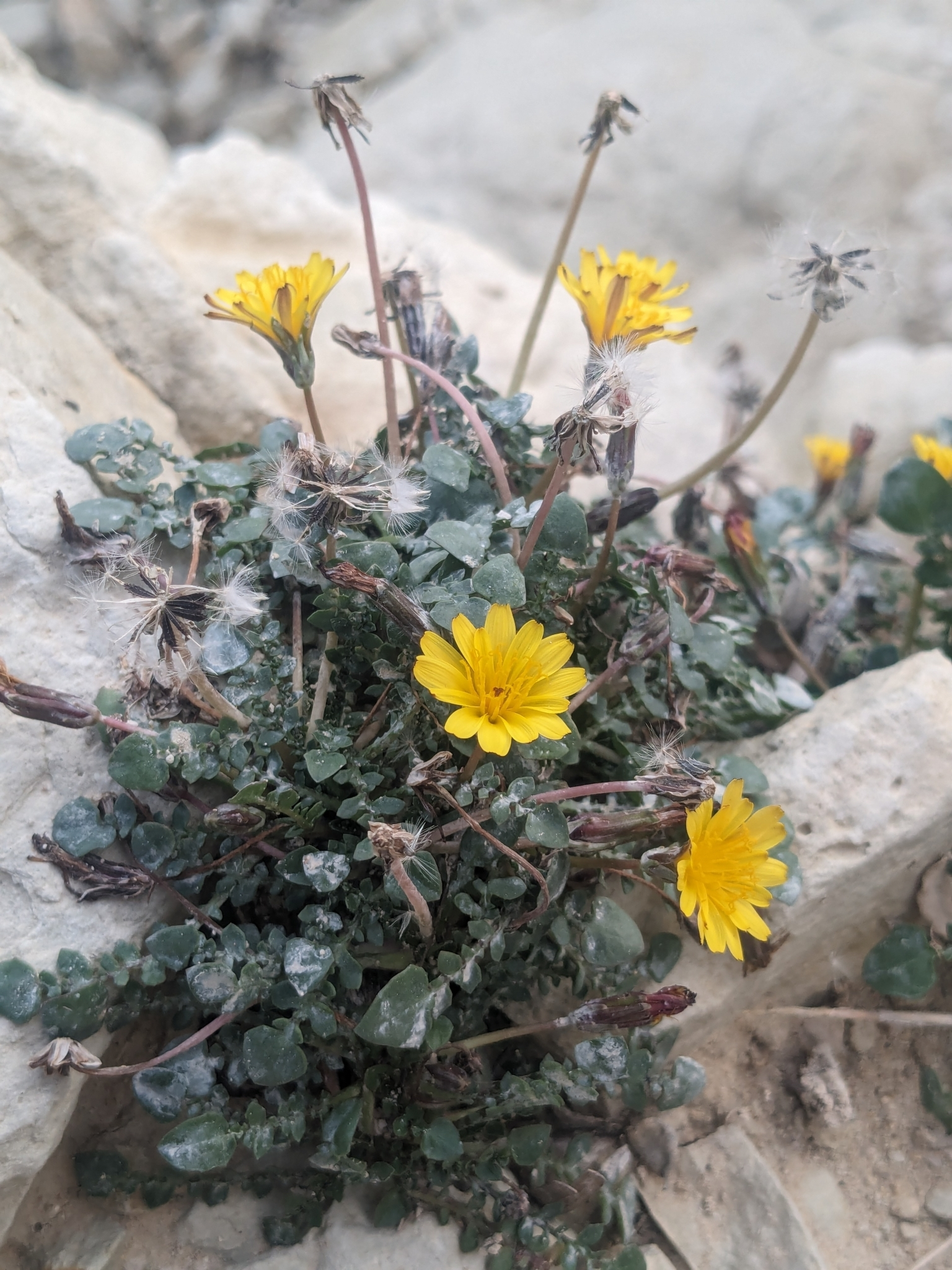

Scientific classification
- Kingdom: Plantae
- Clade: Embryophytes
- Clade: Tracheophytes
- Clade: Spermatophytes
- Clade: Angiosperms
- Clade: Eudicots
- Clade: Asterids
- Order: Asterales
- Family: Asteraceae
- Genus: Taraxacum
- Species: T. aphrogenes

Binomial name
- Taraxacum aphrogenes Meikle

= Taraxacum aphrogenes =

Species of flowering plant

Taraxacum aphrogenes, the Paphos dandelion, is a perennial, lactiferous, rosulate, hairless herb, up to 12 cm high. Leaves all in rosette, simple, divided almost to midrib, into unequal, bluntish, suborbicular lobes, fleshy, oblong, 3–8 x 0.3–2 cm. Flowers in capitula, with yellow, ligulate florets. Flowers October–December in advance of the leaves. Fruit a pappose achene.

== Habitat ==
The species inhabits rock and sandy soils by the coastline.

== Distribution ==
Endemic to Cyprus, it is restricted to the Paphos District where it is locally common, especially at Akamas from Ayios Yeorgios Peyias to Karavopetres: Erimites. Also at Kato Paphos, Yeroskipou and Petra tou Romiou.
