= Mitsero murders =

Series of murders

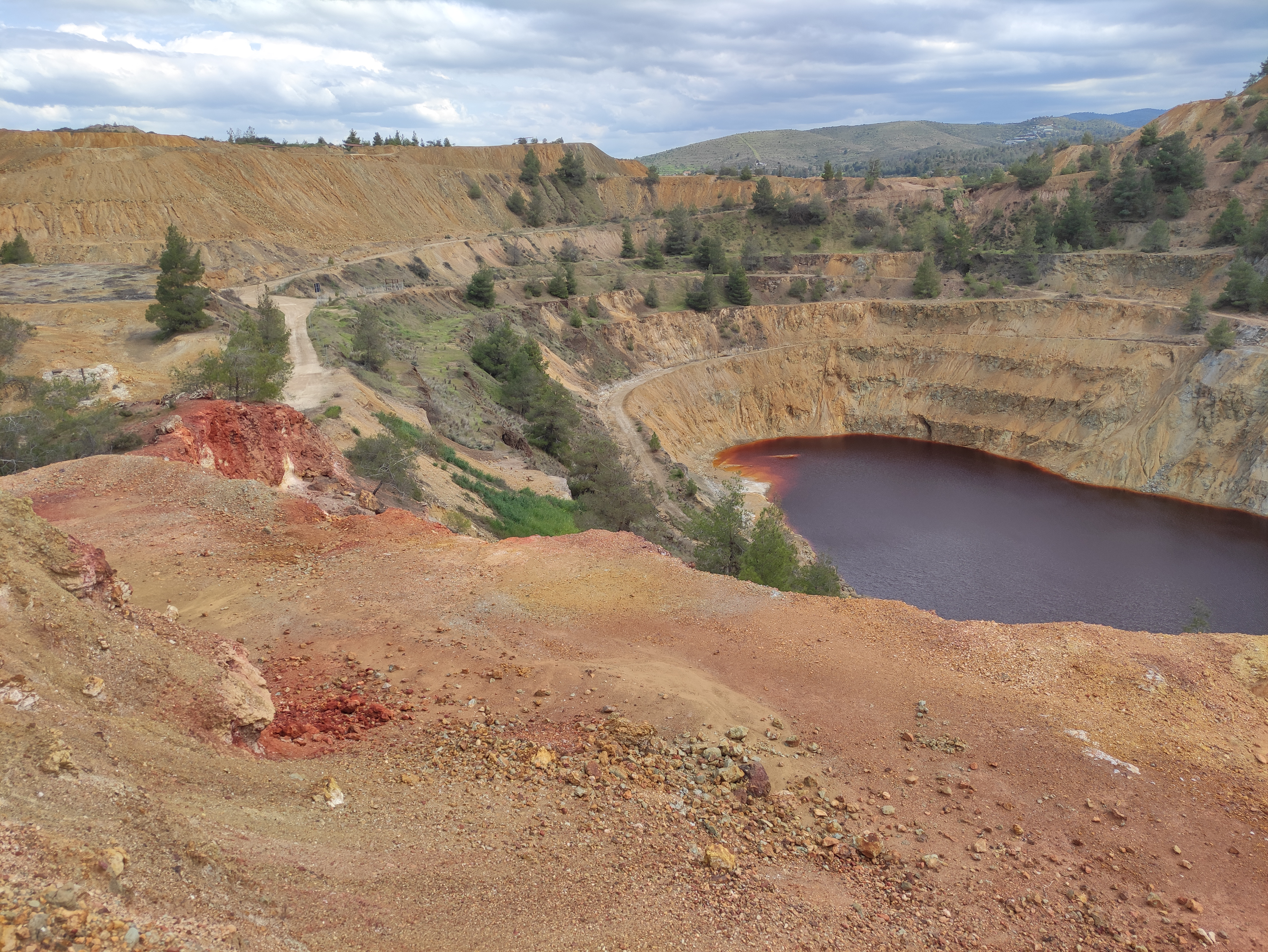
- The lake where bodies of some victims were found in the suitcases
- Date: September 2016 – August 2018
- Location: Mitsero, Nicosia District, Cyprus
- Deaths: 7
- Convictions: Nikos Metaxas
- Sentence: 7 life sentences

The Mitsero murders were a series of killings committed by Nikos Metaxas, a military officer in the Cypriot National Guard, between September 2016 and August 2018. Five of his seven victims were female foreigners he had met on the online dating site Badoo. The remaining two victims were young children and were the daughters of two of his adult victims.

The victims' remains were found over a period of three months in 2019. Unusually heavy floods in April led to the discovery of the first victim, Mary Rose Tiburcio, at a mine shaft near the village of Mitsero. Another body was soon discovered at a firing range by Orounta. Three other victims were stuffed into suitcases and disposed of near Mitsero in Red Lake. The last body, that of Tiburcio's six-year-old daughter Sierra, was found in Lake Memi near Xyliatos.

After he was named as a suspect, multiple women accused Metaxas of crimes such as rape, and he was formally charged with evidence tampering and obstruction of justice; however, critical evidence for these charges was believed to have been destroyed or lost. Metaxas told investigators that he had strangled two of his victims and their daughters because he suspected that the women were planning to "pimp out" their daughters, and he wanted to punish the women and "free" the children. He pleaded guilty on 24 June and received seven life sentences, the largest sentence ever handed down in Cypriot history.

The murders sparked criticism of the Cyprus Police, including by the then Cypriot President Nicos Anastasiades, regarding the force's indifferent attitude to the initial disappearances of the victims. As a result of the case, Minister of Justice Ionas Nicolaou resigned and police chief Zacharias Chrysostomou was fired. As of July 2019, an investigation into the Cyprus Police's handling of the reports was underway. In 2021, the investigation concluded that there was not enough to prove the crime of 'Neglect of Duty'

== Victims ==
Metaxas confessed to the murders of five women and two children, all foreigners. All of the adults were migrant workers. At least four bodies had been dumped in lakes, and two were found in an abandoned mine. 36-year-old Romanian woman Livia Florentina Bunea and her eight-year-old daughter Elena, both killed in September 2016, are thought to have been the first victims. Two decomposed bodies, which the police believe to be those of Bunea and her daughter, were found stuffed into suitcases and dumped in a toxic lake. A third suitcase which is believed to contain the body of Maricar Valtez Arquiola, a 31-year-old Filipino woman who disappeared in December 2017, was also found. Filipina Mary Rose Tiburcio, a 38-year-old Filipino migrant worker, was the last woman killed but the first body found; her body was discovered in an abandoned mine on 14 April 2019 by a German tourist.

Three bodies have been found naked, bound, and wrapped in sheets. The police believe them to be the bodies of two Filipino migrant workers and possibly that of a Nepalese woman, whose body was found at an army shooting range by investigators. The body of six-year-old Filipino girl Sierra Graze Seucalliuc was found in a lake on 12 June 2019. She went missing with her mother, Mary Rose Seucalliuc, in May 2018.

== Perpetrator ==
Nikos Metaxas (Greek: Νίκος Μεταξάς; born in 1984) is a Greek Cypriot former army officer who confessed to the Mitsero murders. He has been sentenced by the Supreme Court of Cyprus to seven life sentences.

== Aftermath ==
Cypriot authorities faced accusations of not fully investigating the reports when the women were first reported missing, which later resulted in the firing of the country's police chief, Zacharias Chrysostomou, as well as the resignation of justice minister, Ionas Nicolaou.

Cypriot businessman Sir Stelios Haji-Ioannou, founder of British airline easyJet, announced that he would donate €10,000 to each of the closest relatives of each victim. As of July 2019, he has been unable to contact the relatives of two of the victims, and has said that he will donate the additional sums of €10,000 each to Metaxas' eight-year-old son and six-year-old daughter for their education in the meantime.

== See also ==
- List of serial killers by country
