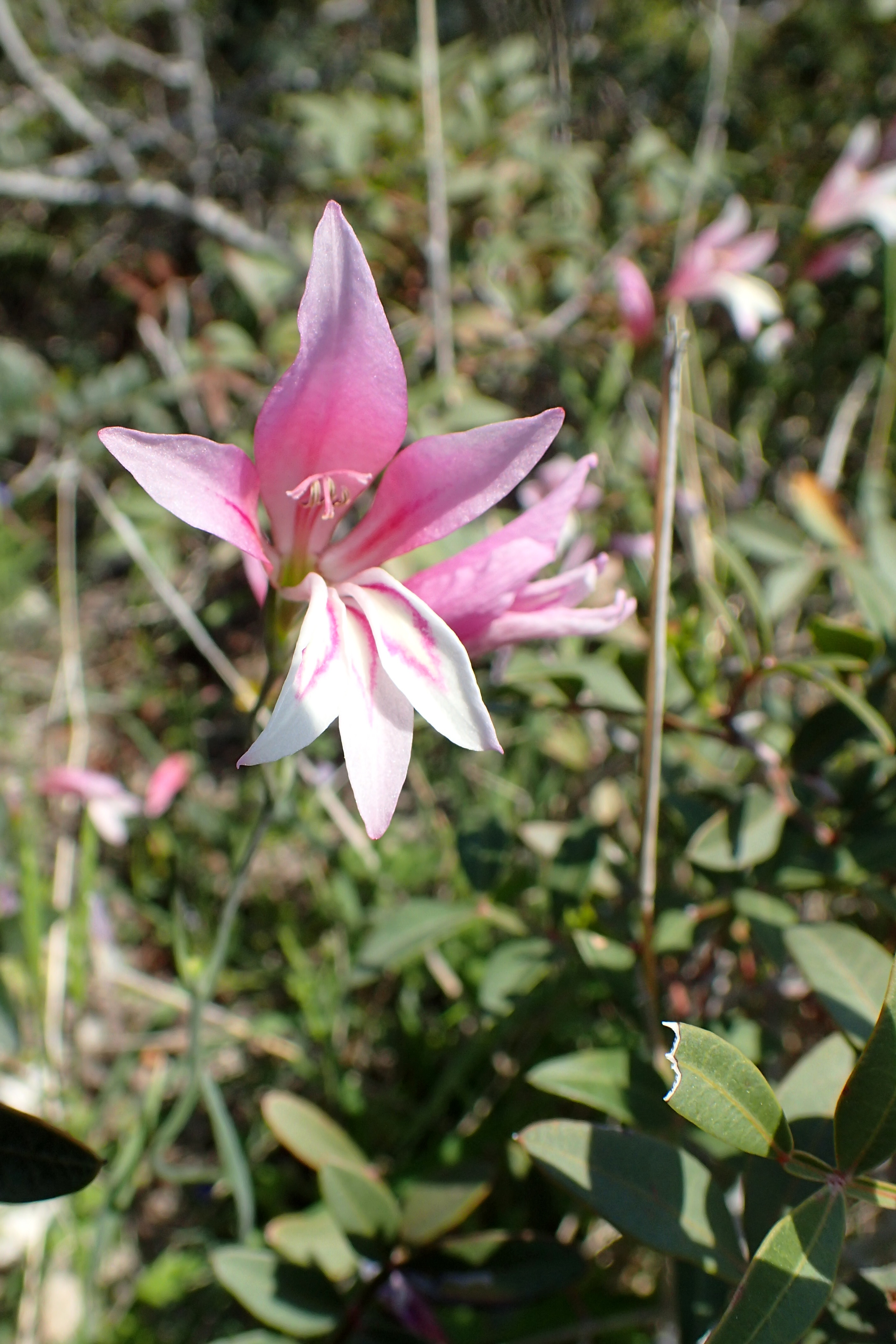

Conservation status
- Least Concern (IUCN 3.1)

Scientific classification
- Kingdom: Plantae
- Clade: Tracheophytes
- Clade: Angiosperms
- Clade: Monocots
- Order: Asparagales
- Family: Iridaceae
- Genus: Gladiolus
- Species: G. triphyllus

Binomial name
- Gladiolus triphyllus (Sm.) Ker Gawl.

= Gladiolus triphyllus =

Species of flowering plant

Gladiolus triphyllus, the three-leaved gladiolus, is a species of flowering plant in the family Iridaceae. It is endemic to Cyprus.

== Description ==
The three-leaved gladiolus is an erect perennial herb, 15–30 cm high, glabrous, glaucous, with an ovoid corm. Leaves usually 3 or 4, alternate, simple, entire, linear, the two lower 10-30 x 0.3-0.5 cm, the upper much reduced. The flowers are on a spike, zygomorphic, perianth of 6 petaloid parts, 2.5–3 cm long, pale or dark rose pink, scented only in the afternoon, bracts 1.5–3 cm long. It flowers from March to May. The fruit is a capsule.

== Distribution and habitat ==
The three-leaved gladiolus is endemic to Cyprus and is locally common especially in Akamas (Smyies, Fontana, Amoroza, Karavopetres, Erimites etc.), Tripylos, Dodheka Anemi (Paphos forest), Stavrovouni, Akrotiri, Pentadaktylos, Yialousa.

The three-leaved gladiolus inhabits openings in forests and other wooded areas, such as maquis and garigue, especially in rocky territory. It is found at altitudes of up to 1,225 m.

== Conservation ==
The three-leaved gladiolus is listed as being of least concern on the IUCN Red List. It is found widely throughout the island and does not face any significant threats. It occurs in several protected areas, such as the Akamas Peninsula, Troodos, and the Akrotiri Peninsula, with the last of these being a Natura 2000 site.
