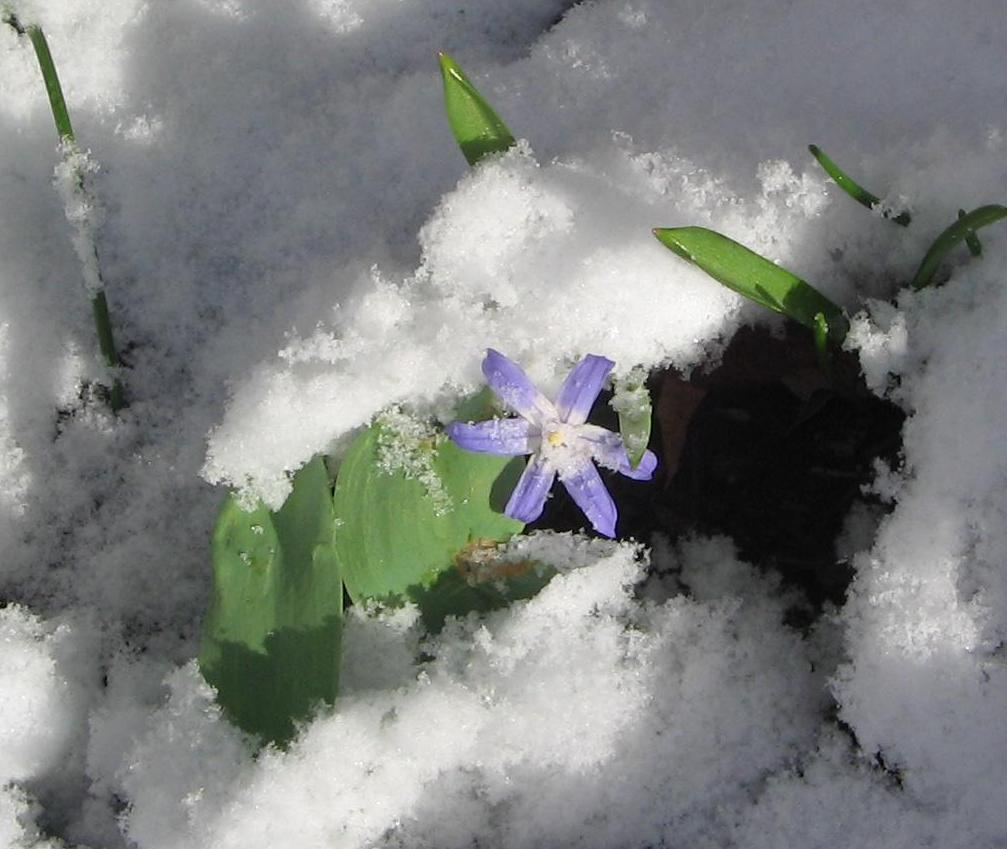
- A glory-of-the-snow in the snow

Scientific classification
- Kingdom: Plantae
- Clade: Tracheophytes
- Clade: Angiosperms
- Clade: Monocots
- Order: Asparagales
- Family: Asparagaceae
- Subfamily: Scilloideae
- Genus: Scilla
- Section: Scilla sect. Chionodoxa (Boiss.) Trávn.

Species
- See text.

Synonyms
- Chionodoxa Boiss.

= Scilla sect. Chionodoxa =

Section of flowering plants

Scilla section Chionodoxa, known as glory-of-the-snow, is a small group of bulbous perennial flowering plants in the family Asparagaceae, subfamily Scilloideae. Formerly treated as the separate genus Chionodoxa, they are now included in Scilla as a section. The section is endemic to the eastern Mediterranean, specifically Crete, Cyprus and Turkey. The blue, white or pink flowers appear early in the year making them valuable garden ornamentals. The common name of the group is based on the habit of flowering in high alpine zones when the snow melts in spring.

== Description ==
Species placed in Scilla sect. Chionodoxa are short bulbous plants. Each bulb produces two leaves, narrow at the base and broadening towards the tip. The flowers have tepals that are joined at the base to between 15% and 40% of their total length. The filaments of the stamens are broadened, usually white (rarely blue in the upper part), with the lower part joined to the perianth. The anthers of the stamens are yellow (rarely blue), with pale yellow pollen. The pistil is hidden behind the stamens.

Growth stages

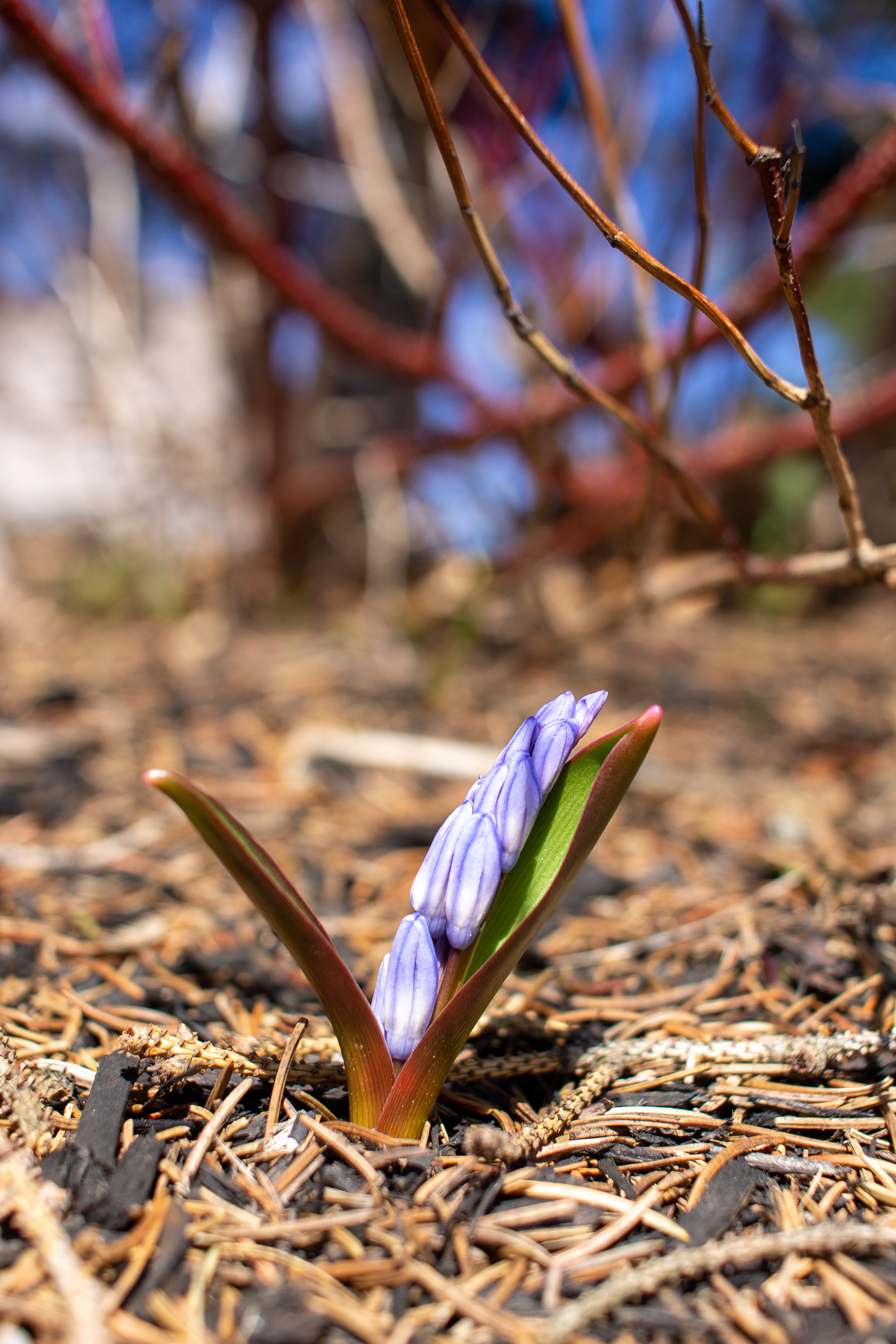

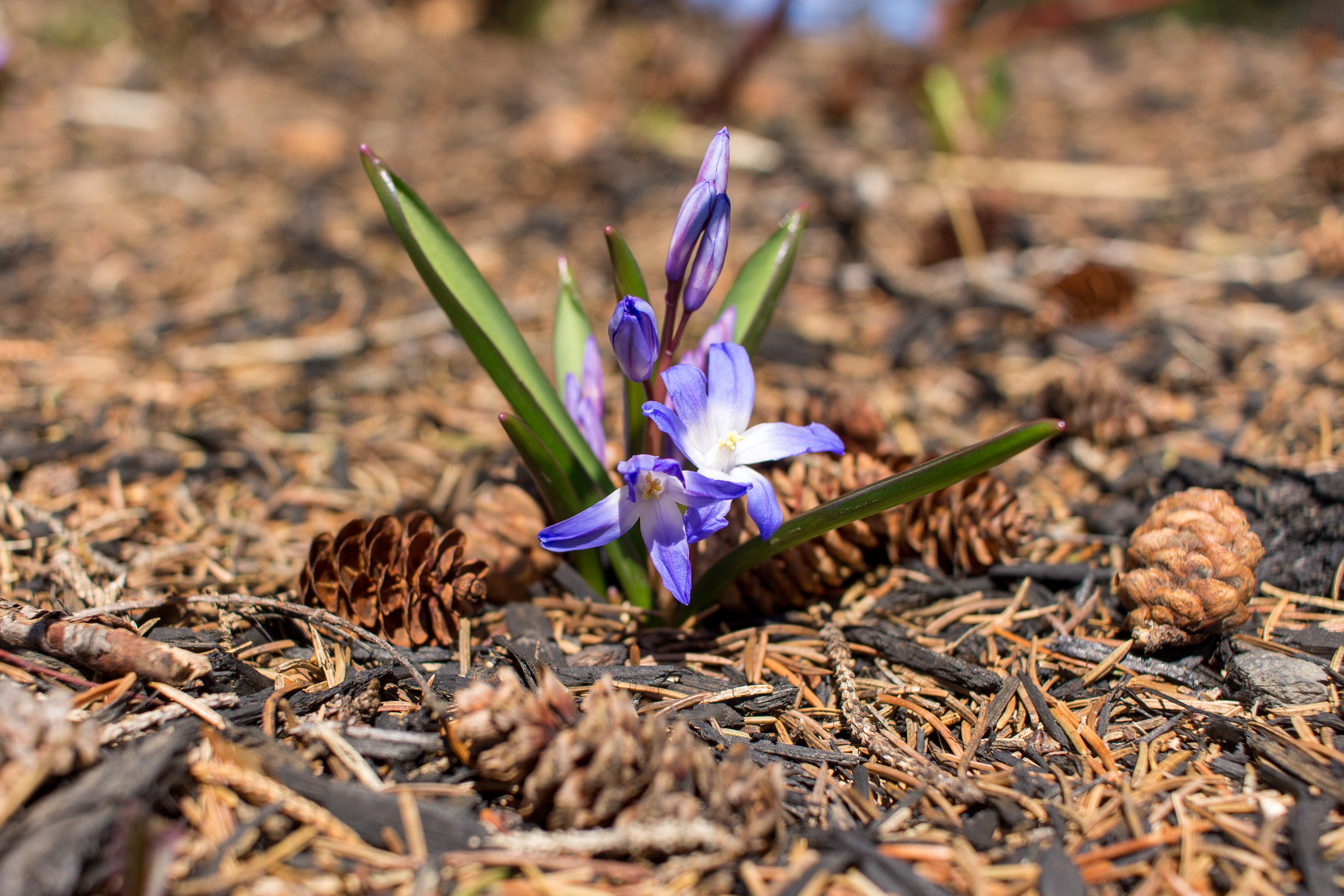

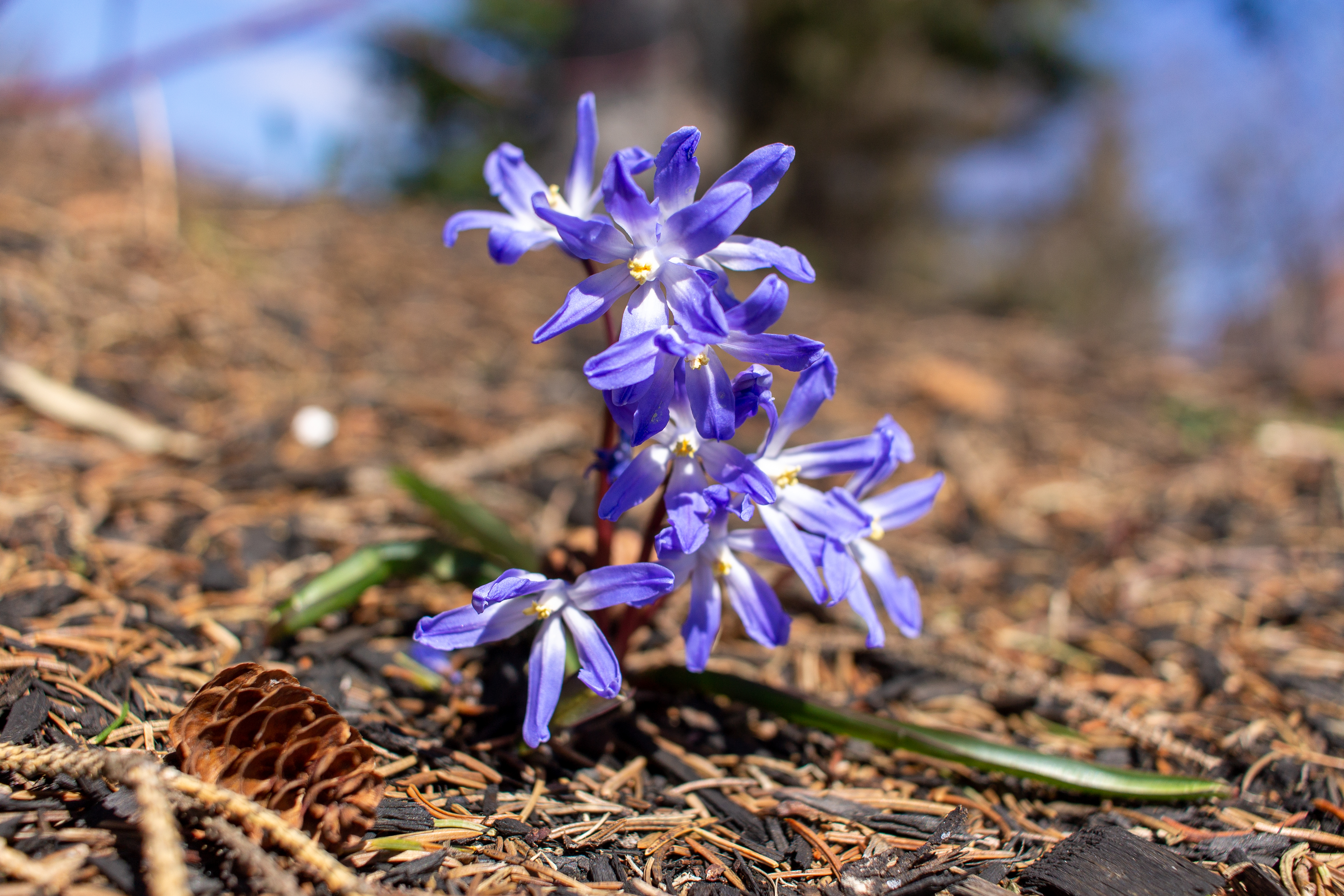

== Taxonomy ==
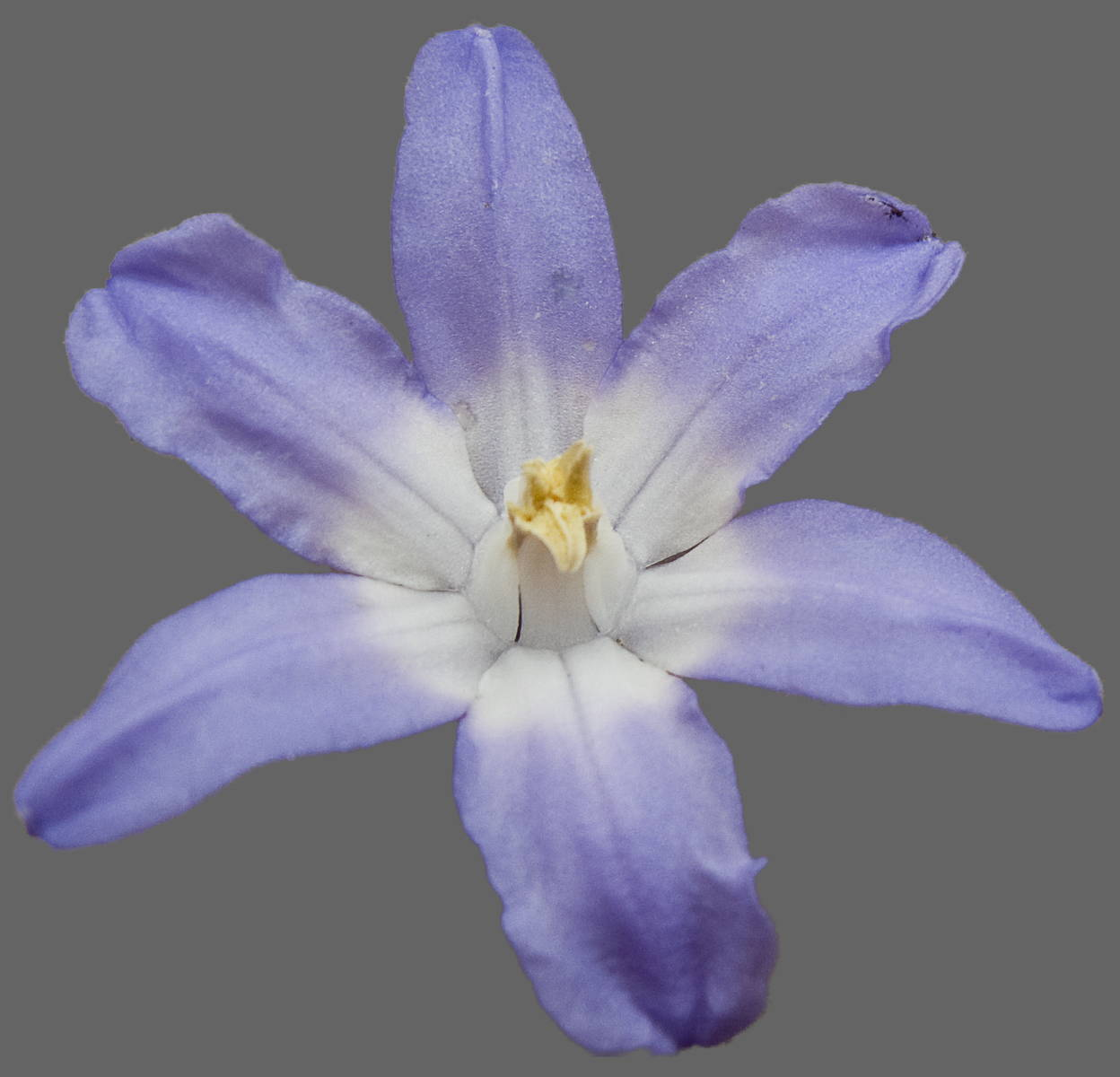
Close-up of a flower, showing the 'cup' formed by the flattened filaments of the stamens

The taxon was first described as the genus Chionodoxa by Pierre Edmond Boissier in 1844. Chionodoxa was distinguished from the genus Scilla by two features: the tepals are joined at their bases to form a tube rather than being free; and the stamens have flattened stalks (filaments), which look almost like a cup in the centre of the flower. From the 1970s onwards, Speta in particular argued that perianth features were not informative in the family Hyacinthaceae (here subfamily Scilloideae), and that Chionodoxa was closely related to Scilla bifolia, the type species of the genus Scilla. A 1999 phylogenetic study, based on plastid DNA, included some species which have been placed in Chionodoxa and showed that they were embedded within Scilla. The relevant part of the cladogram is shown below (with recent names); two former Chionodoxa species are shaded in yellow.

- - 3 Muscari spp.
  - - Scilla subnivalis
    - - Scilla cydonia
      - - Scilla nana (including Scilla albescens)
        - - Scilla bifolia 1 (S. spetana)
          - - Scilla bifolia 2 (S. aff. bulgarica)
            - Scilla forbesii (as S. siehei)

Submerging Chionodoxa within Scilla was resisted for a long time; for example Dashwood and Mathew kept Chionodoxa separate in 2005. In 2009, Bohumil Trávníček and coauthors proposed treating the genus Chionodoxa as Scilla sect. Chionodoxa, a proposal adopted by other workers.

=== Species ===
The number of species accepted in the group has varied. Several of the species are very similar, and the number of species recognized as distinct has differed significantly from one source to another. For example, plants occurring in Crete have at one time or another been put into three species (then in the genus Chionodoxa): C. albescens, C. cretica and C. nana. In 1987, Sfikas' Wild flowers of Crete recognized only two of these (as C. cretica and C. nana); in 1993, the Natural History Museum's checklist of the Cretan Flora recognized only one (Scilla nana). In 2005, the Royal Horticultural Society distinguished between C. forbesii and C. siehei, as did Yildirim et al. in 2017 (now using the genus Scilla). As of March 2020, the World Checklist of Selected Plant Families sank S. siehei into S. forbesii.

As of March 2020, the World Checklist of Selected Plant Families accepted the following species formerly placed in Chionodoxa:

- Scilla cretica, syn. Chionodoxa cretica (Cretan glory-of-the-snow) – Crete
- Scilla forbesii, syns Chionodoxa forbesii (Forbes' glory-of-the-snow), C. siehei (Siehe's glory-of-the-snow), C. tmoli, C. tmolusii – south-west and west Turkey
- Scilla lochiae, syns Chionodoxa lochiae (Loch's glory-of-the-snow), C. gigantea – Cyprus
- Scilla luciliae, syn. Chionodoxa luciliae (Lucile's glory-of-the-snow) – west Turkey
- Scilla nana, syns Chionodoxa nana (dwarf glory-of-the-snow), C. albescens (pale glory-of-the-snow) – Crete
- Scilla sardensis, syn. Chionodoxa sardensis (lesser glory-of-the-snow) – west Turkey

== Distribution ==
Assuming there are six species, as listed above, three occur in south-west and west Turkey, two in Crete and one in Cyprus. Garden plants have naturalized outside of their native range, e.g. in the UK, Germany, Austria and the Netherlands. A natural hybrid S. siehei x S. luciliae also occurs.

== Cultivation ==
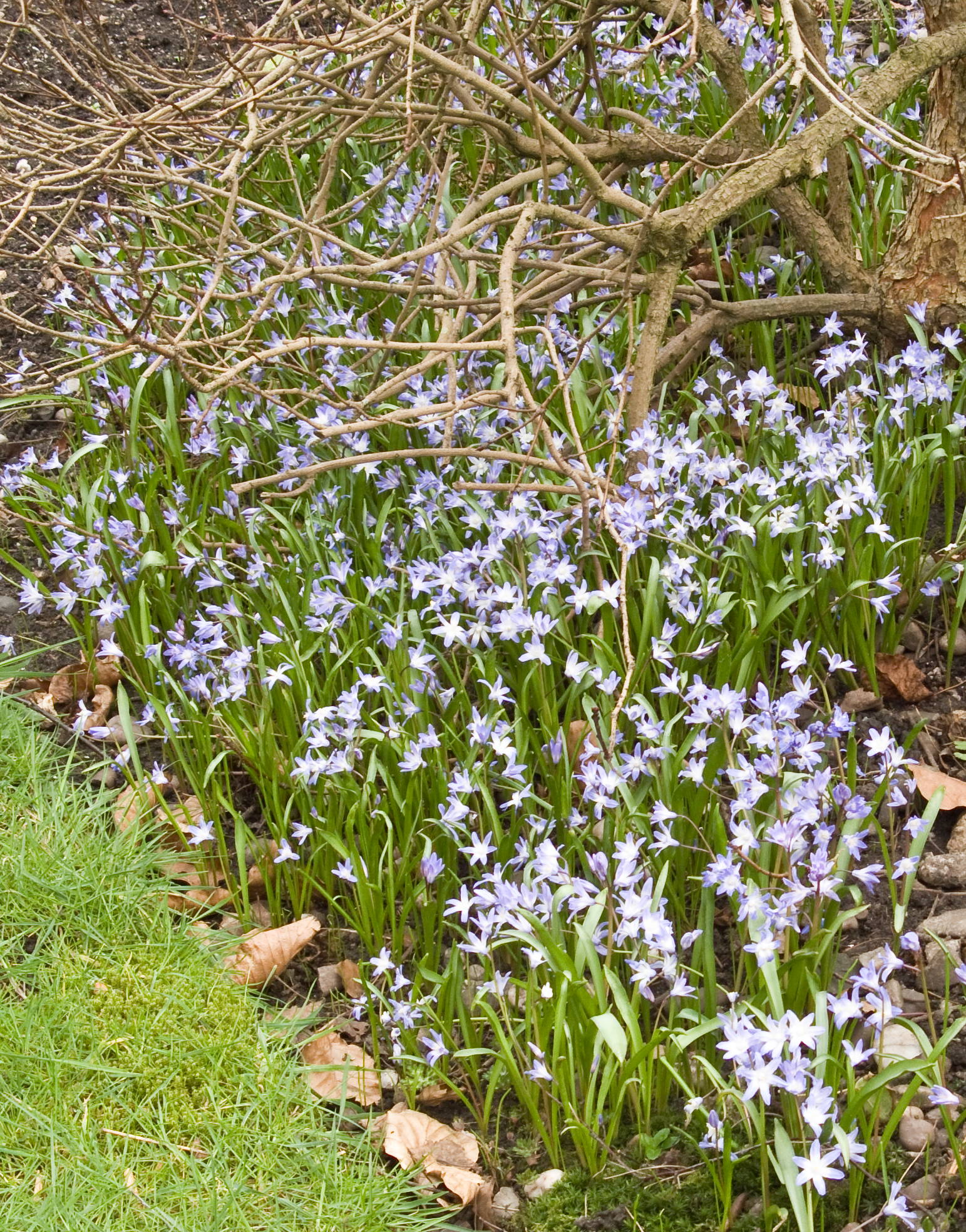
Self-sown carpet of Scilla forbesii (syn. Chionodoxa siehei) under a deciduous shrub, flowering in early April in the West Midlands, England

There has been considerable confusion over the correct names of species grown in gardens, with the most common being called either Chionodoxa luciliae, C. forbesii or C. siehei. A 2005 Royal Horticultural Society publication which illustrated all three of these species stated that the most common garden species is properly called C. siehei. C. siehei and C. forbesii are now regarded by other sources as synonyms of S. forbesii.

Three species were awarded the RHS Award of Garden Merit (H4 – hardy outdoors anywhere in the British Isles) in 1993 which was re-confirmed in 2004: S. luciliae, S. sardensis, and S. forbesii (as C. siehei). (S. nana subsp. albescens was also given the award subject to availability.)

All can be bought as dry bulbs and planted while dormant in late summer or early autumn at a depth of 8–10 cm. They require light when in growth, but can be grown under deciduous trees or shrubs, as their foliage dies down after flowering. All flower in early Spring, S. sardensis usually being the earliest. S. forbesii seeds freely in many gardens, and can create a carpet of blue. In addition to the common purplish-blue varieties, S. forbesii is sold as pink and white cultivars (possibly under the name C. siehei).

== General and cited references ==
- Yildirim, Hasan; Altıoglu, Yusuf (2021). "Resurrection of Genus Chionodoxa Boiss. (Asparagaceae), a morphological revision of Chionodoxa taxa in Turkey and a new species of this genus". Bağbahçe Bilim Dergisi (in Turkish). 8 (1): 5195.
- Beckett, Kenneth; Grey-Wilson, Christopher, eds. (1993). Alpine Garden Society Encyclopaedia of Alpines, Vol. 1 (A–K). Pershore, UK: AGS Publications. ISBN 978-0-900048-63-0.
- Dashwood, Melanie & Mathew, Brian (2005). "Hyacinthaceae – little blue bulbs (RHS Plant Trials and Awards, Bulletin Number 11)". Royal Horticultural Society. Archived from the original on 28 August 2015.
- Mathew, Brian (1987). The Smaller Bulbs. London: B T Batsford. ISBN 978-0-7134-4922-8.
- Mathew, Brian (2005). "Hardy Hyacinthaceae, Part 2: Scilla, Chionodoxa, xChionoscilla". The Plantsman. New Series. 4 (2): 110–21.
- Sfikas, George (1987). Wild Flowers of Crete. Athens: Efstathiadis. ISBN 978-960-226-052-4.
- Turland, N.J.; Chilton, L.; Press, J.R & Natural History Museum (London) (1993). Flora of the Cretan Area: annotated checklist and atlas. London: HMSO. ISBN 978-0-11-310043-9.
