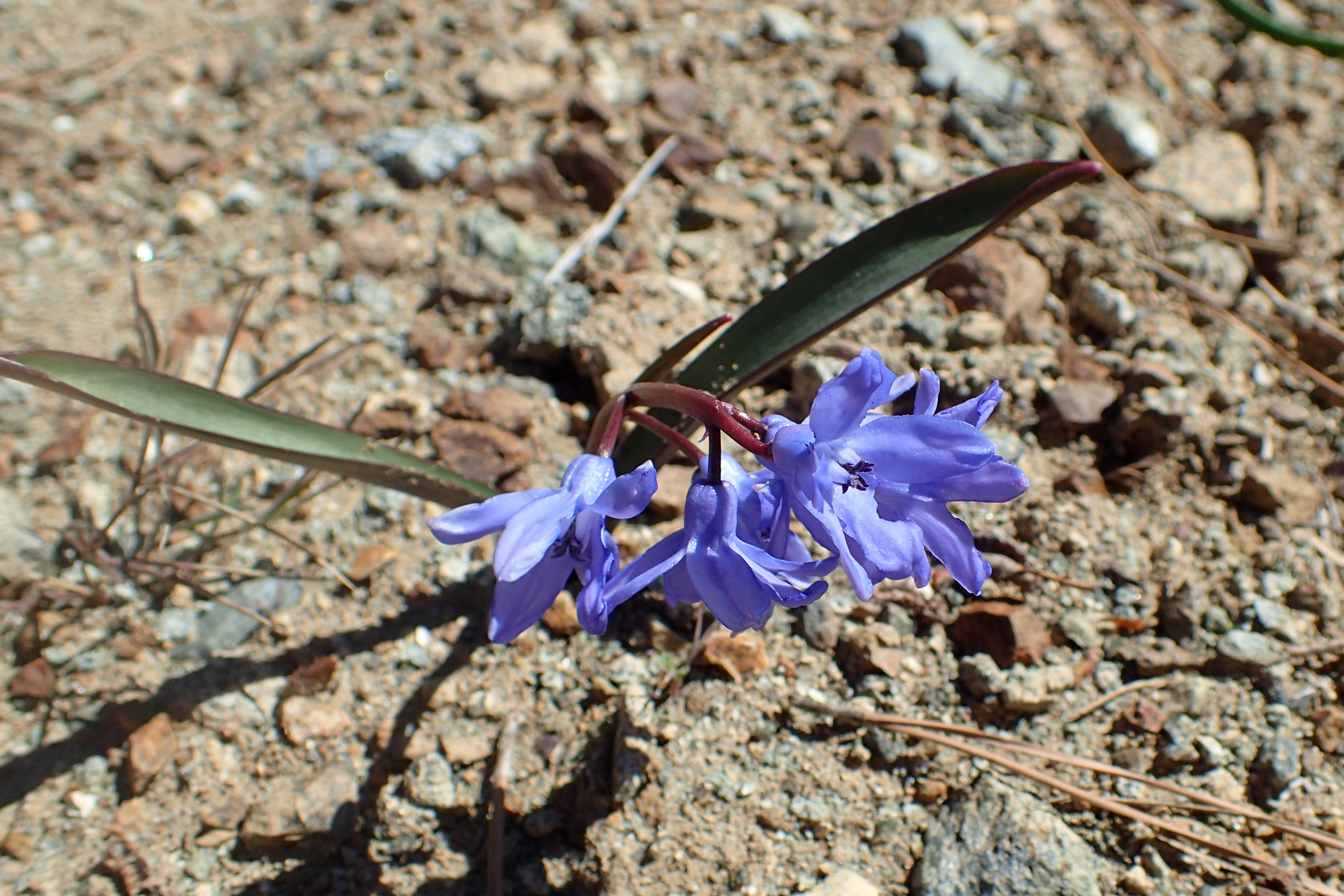
- Scilla lochiae

Conservation status
- Near Threatened (IUCN 3.1)

Scientific classification
- Kingdom: Plantae
- Clade: Embryophytes
- Clade: Tracheophytes
- Clade: Spermatophytes
- Clade: Angiosperms
- Clade: Monocots
- Order: Asparagales
- Family: Asparagaceae
- Subfamily: Scilloideae
- Genus: Scilla
- Section: Scilla sect. Chionodoxa
- Species: S. lochiae

Binomial name
- Scilla lochiae (Meikle) Speta

Synonyms
- Chionodoxa lochiae Meikle

= Scilla lochiae =

Species of flowering plant

Scilla lochiae, known as Loch's glory-of-the-snow, is a species of flowering plant in the family Asparagaceae. It is a bulbous perennial from Cyprus flowering in early spring. After flowering, it goes into dormancy until the next spring. It was named after Lady Loch who collected it. It belongs to a group of Scilla species that were formerly put in a separate genus, Chionodoxa, which may now be treated as Scilla sect. Chionodoxa.

Like all former Chionodoxa species, the bases of the stamens are flattened and closely clustered in the middle of the flower. In other species of Scilla, the stamens are not flattened or clustered together.

S. lochiae is an endemic of the Troodos Mountains of Cyprus, where it flowers during March and April in moist organic soils in pine forests at higher elevations. Found only in a small area, it is strictly protected under the Berne Convention.

It has relatively few flowers in a raceme, each about 2.5 cm in diameter. The flowers are bright blue, without white at the base of the tepals, as most other former Chionodoxa species have, although the stamen bases are white. Photographs taken in the wild show the flowers nodding rather than upright.

== See also ==
- List of Scilla species

== Bibliography ==
- Dashwood, Melanie & Mathew, Brian (2005), Hyacinthaceae – little blue bulbs (RHS Plant Trials and Awards, Bulletin Number 11), Royal Horticultural Society, archived from the original on 28 August 2015
- Mathew, Brian (1987), The Smaller Bulbs, London: B T Batsford, ISBN 978-0-7134-4922-8
- Yildirim, H.; Yetisen, K.; Özdemir, A. & Özdemir, C. (2017), "An Anatomical Study of Scilla (Scilloideae) Section Chionodoxa and Scilla bifolia in Turkey" (PDF), Planta Daninha, 35: e017162495, doi:10.1590/s0100-83582017350100004
