= Gagea juliae =

Yellow star-of-Cyprus

Scientific classification
- Kingdom: Plantae
- Clade: Embryophytes
- Clade: Tracheophytes
- Clade: Spermatophytes
- Clade: Angiosperms
- Clade: Monocots
- Order: Liliales
- Family: Liliaceae
- Subfamily: Lilioideae
- Genus: Gagea
- Species: G. juliae

Binomial name
- Gagea juliae Pascher

Species of flowering plant

Gagea juliae, the yellow star-of-Cyprus, is a plant species in the lily family, native to Cyprus and southern Turkey.

Gagea juliae is a bulbous perennial herb with erect stems 2–20 cm (0.8–7.9 in) high. Flowers yellow internally with a broad greenish stripe externally on each perianth segment. Flowering February–April.

== Habitat ==
On damp shaded hillsides in garigue, by roadsides or in moist rock crevices or in pine forest at 50–1,650 m (160–5,410 ft) altitude.

== Distribution ==
Native to Cyprus and southern Turkey, it is found in Akamas, Ayia, Stavros Psokas, Tripylos the Troödos forest, Platres, Ayios Theodoros (Adelphi Forest), the Makhera and Limassol Forests, Kellaki, Pentadaktylos, Yialousa.
