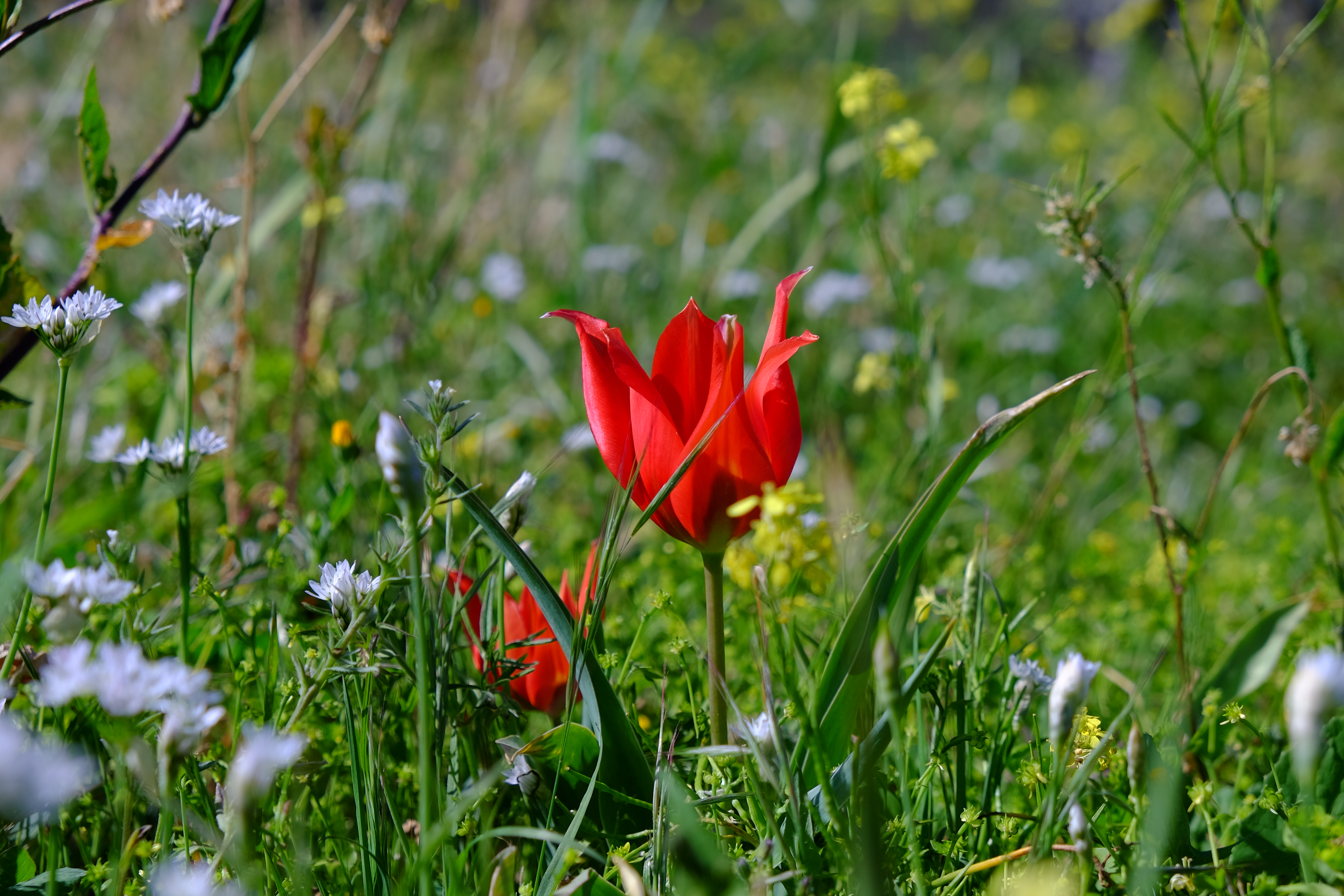

Conservation status
- Endangered (IUCN 3.1)

Scientific classification
- Kingdom: Plantae
- Clade: Tracheophytes
- Clade: Angiosperms
- Clade: Monocots
- Order: Liliales
- Family: Liliaceae
- Subfamily: Lilioideae
- Tribe: Lilieae
- Genus: Tulipa
- Subgenus: Tulipa subg. Tulipa
- Species: T. cypria

Binomial name
- Tulipa cypria Stapf ex Turrill

= Tulipa cypria =

Species of flowering plant

Tulipa cypria, the Cyprus tulip, is a tulip, an erect perennial bulbous herb, 15–40 cm high (in blossom), with glabrous, glaucous leaves. It has four leaves which are alternate, simple, entire and fleshy. The two lower leaves are larger, lanceolate, 10-20 x 2–6 cm, with conspicuously undulate margins while the two higher leaves are much smaller, nearly linear. One terminal showy flower, perianth cup shaped, of six free, petaloid segments, 2.5-9 x 1-3.5 cm, with dark blood-red colour, internally with a black blotch bordered by a yellow zone. It flowers March–April. The fruit is a capsule.

== Habitat ==
The Cypriot tulip grows in juniperus phoenicea maquis pastures and cereal fields, on limestone at altitudes of 100–300 m (330–980 ft) above sea level.

== Distribution ==
The plant is endemic to Cyprus, on Akamas, Kormakitis and some areas of the Pentadaktylos range. It is very rare and strictly protected.
