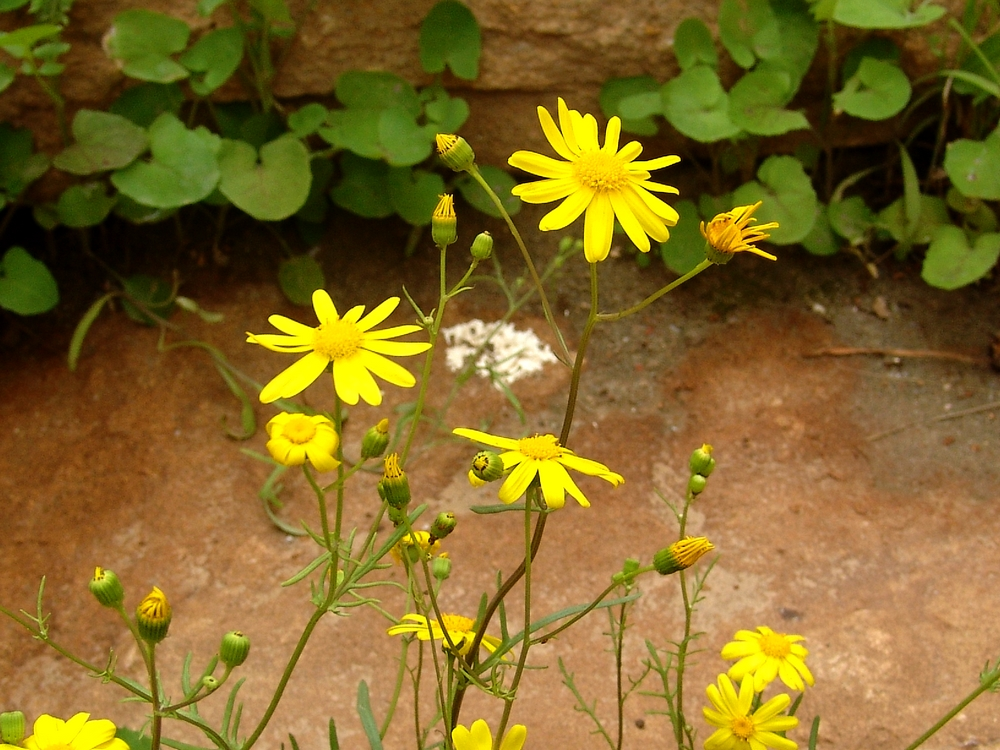
- Jaffa groundsel

Scientific classification
- Kingdom: Plantae
- Clade: Tracheophytes
- Clade: Angiosperms
- Clade: Eudicots
- Clade: Asterids
- Order: Asterales
- Family: Asteraceae
- Genus: Senecio
- Species: S. glaucus

Binomial name
- Senecio glaucus L.

Subspecies
- Senecio glaucus subsp. coronopifolius (Maire) C.Alexander; Senecio glaucus subsp. cyprius Meikle; Senecio glaucus subsp. glaucus

Synonyms
- Senecio coronopifolius Desf. Senecio joppensis Dinsm. Senecio ruepellii Sch.Bip. Senecio desfontainei Druce; Senecio laxiflorus Viv. Senecio subdentatus Ledeb

= Senecio glaucus =

Species of flowering plant

Senecio glaucus is an annual member of the Asteraceae and species of the genus Senecio. It is found from the western Mediterranean to Central Asia in sandy, well-drained soil, particularly coastal and desert dunes.

== Common names ==
- English: Jaffa groundsel, Buck's horn groundsel
- Arabic: شيخة رمادية or جرجار or النوير

== Distribution and habitat ==
Found in sandy soils of coastal plains, strands, and steppes.

Native to the Palearctic
Middle East: Afghanistan, Algeria, Egypt - Sinai, Israel, Iran, Iraq, Jordan, Kuwait, Lebanon, Libya, Morocco, Pakistan, Saudi Arabia, Syria, Tunisia, Turkey - Anatolia
Macaronesia: Canary Islands - Gran Canaria, Fuerteventura, Gomera, Hierro, Lanzarote, Tenerife
East Europe: Saratov Oblast, Volgograd Oblast, Astrakhan Oblast, Rostov Oblast, Kalmykiya
Southeastern Europe: Bulgaria, Crete, Crimea, Greece, Italy, Kosovo, Malta, Montenegro, Serbia, Sicily
Southwestern Europe: Balearic Islands, France, Portugal, Spain
Western Asia: Israel
Caucasus: Adygea, Armenia, Azerbaijan, Chechnya, Dagestan, Georgia, Ingushetia, Kabardino-Balkaria, Karachay–Cherkessia, Krasnodar Krai, North Ossetia–Alania, Stavropol Krai
Central Asia: Turkmenistan, Uzbekistan
India: Himachal Pradesh, Jammu and Kashmir

== Subspecies ==
Three subspecies are accepted.

- Senecio glaucus subsp. coronopifolius (Maire) C.Alexander (synonyms S. chrysanthemifolius DC., S. coronopifolius Desf., S. desfontainei Druce, S. gallicus subsp. coronopifolius Maire, S. glaucus subsp. hyblaeus Brullo, S. lacerus Boiss., S. laxiflorus Viv., S. noeanus Rupr.) – Sicily, Malta, and Canary Islands to Sahara, western and Central Asia, Caucasus, and western Himalayas
- Senecio glaucus subsp. cyprius Meikle – western and southwestern Cyprus
- Senecio glaucus subsp. glaucus (synonym S. joppensis Dinsm.) – Egypt, Sinai, and the Levant
