= Asperula cypria =

Scientific classification
- Kingdom: Plantae
- Clade: Tracheophytes
- Clade: Angiosperms
- Clade: Eudicots
- Clade: Asterids
- Order: Gentianales
- Family: Rubiaceae
- Genus: Asperula
- Species: A. cypria

Binomial name
- Asperula cypria Ehrend.

Species of plant

Asperula cypria is an erect or spreading woody subshrub 30–60 cm high. Flowers whitish or tinged pink or red, flowering in May–June.

== Habitat ==
Dry rocky limestone or igneous hillsides, sometimes under pines at 150–1200 m altitude.

== Distribution ==
Endemic to Cyprus where it is common especially in the lowlands.
