= Mitsero =

Mitsero: Μιτσερό (Greek); Miçero (Turkish)
- Location in Cyprus
- Coordinates: 35°2′32″N 33°7′37″E
- Country: Cyprus
- District: Nicosia District

Population (2001)
  - Total: 713
- Time zone: UTC+2 (EET)
  - Summer (DST): UTC+3 (EEST)

Mitsero (Greek: Μιτσερό; Turkish: Miçero) is a village located in the Nicosia District of Cyprus, west of Nicosia. Traditionally the local industry was mining for pyrites.

The village attracted widespread attention in April 2019 due to the Mitsero murders.
