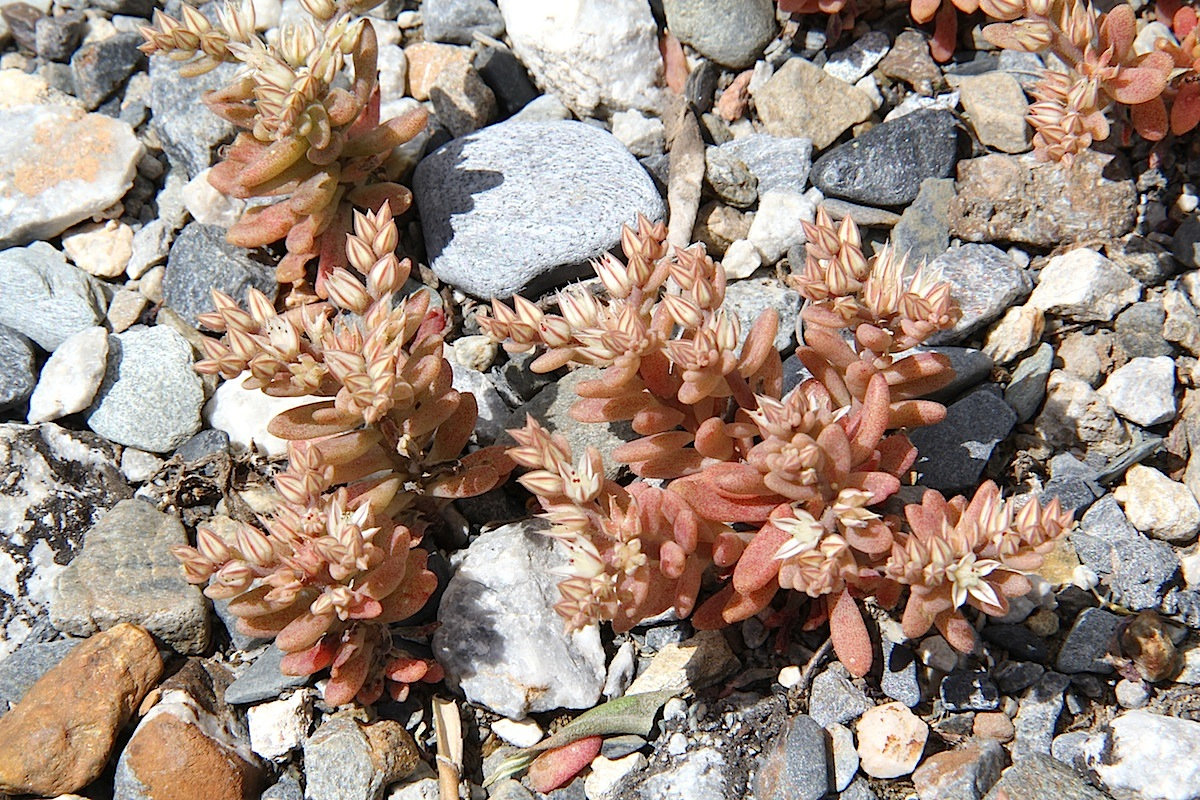
- Sedum eriocarpum subsp. spathulifolium

Scientific classification
- Kingdom: Plantae
- Clade: Tracheophytes
- Clade: Angiosperms
- Clade: Eudicots
- Order: Saxifragales
- Family: Crassulaceae
- Genus: Sedum
- Species: S. eriocarpum

Binomial name
- Sedum eriocarpum Sm. (1809)

Subspecies
- 9; see text

Synonyms
- Sedum glaucum var. eriocarpum (Sm.) Boiss. (1872)

= Sedum eriocarpum =

Species of succulent plant

Sedum eriocarpum, the purple stonecrop, is a small, annual, succulent herb, 3–6 cm high, with hairless, reddish-green stems. Leaves succulent, simple, entire, spirally arranged, hairless, stalkless, elliptical to oblong, 3–15 x 2–8 mm, green or green-reddish. Flowers actinomorphic, petals white with purplish keel. It flowers from March to May and the fruit is a follicle.

== Distribution and habitat ==
Sedum eriocarpum has been recorded in mainland Greece, Turkey, the Levant and the islands of the eastern Mediterranean. It is found on rocky and stony hillsides on limestone formations at 0–600 m elevation.

== Subspecies ==
9 subspecies are accepted.

- Sedum eriocarpum subsp. apertiflorum 't Hart – northern and central Greece
- Sedum eriocarpum subsp. caricum (Carlström) 't Hart (synonym S. caricum Carlström) – Turkey and Rhodes
- Sedum eriocarpum subsp. cycladicum Kit Tan & Polymenakos – Aegean Islands
- Sedum eriocarpum subsp. delicum (Vierh.) 't Hart (synonyms S. delicum (Vierh.) Carlström and S. rubens subsp. delicum Vierh.) – southern Greece and Cyclades
- Sedum eriocarpum subsp. epiroticum (Bald.) 't Hart – western Greece
- Sedum eriocarpum subsp. eriocarpum – southern Greece and adjacent islands
- Sedum eriocarpum subsp. orientale 't Hart – Israel, Lebanon, Palestine, and Syria
- Sedum eriocarpum subsp. porphyreum (Kotschy) 't Hart (synonym S. porphyreum Kotschy) – Cyprus
- Sedum eriocarpum subsp. spathulifolium 't Hart – western and west-central Crete
