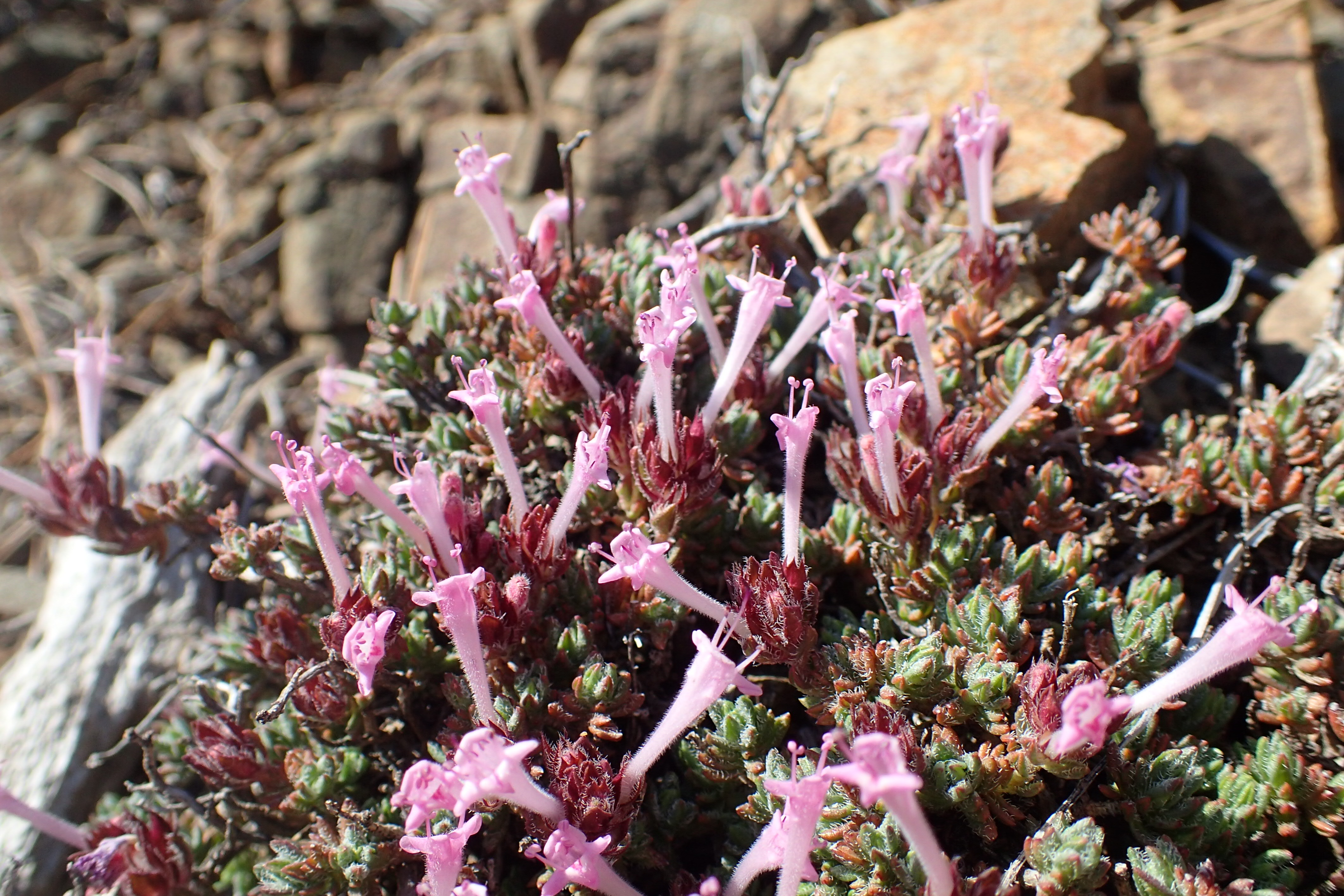

Scientific classification
- Kingdom: Plantae
- Clade: Tracheophytes
- Clade: Angiosperms
- Clade: Eudicots
- Clade: Asterids
- Order: Lamiales
- Family: Lamiaceae
- Genus: Thymus
- Species: T. integer

Binomial name
- Thymus integer Griseb.

Synonyms
- Origanum integrum (Griseb.) Kuntze; Thymus billardierei Boiss.

= Thymus integer =

Species of shrub

Thymus integer is a species of flowering plant in the family Lamiaceae. It is a strongly aromatic, sprawling, gnarled subshrub generally less than 10 cm high. It produces white to dark rosy purple flowers between March and June.

== Habitat ==
This plant is often found on dry, rocky, igneous hillsides at altitudes of 100–1700 meters.

== Distribution ==
A Cyprus endemic, it is common in the Troödos Mountains and the Akamas area.
