= Second Anastasiades government =

Cypriot presidential administration between 2018–2023

Anastasiades government
- 13th Government of Cyprus
- Incumbent
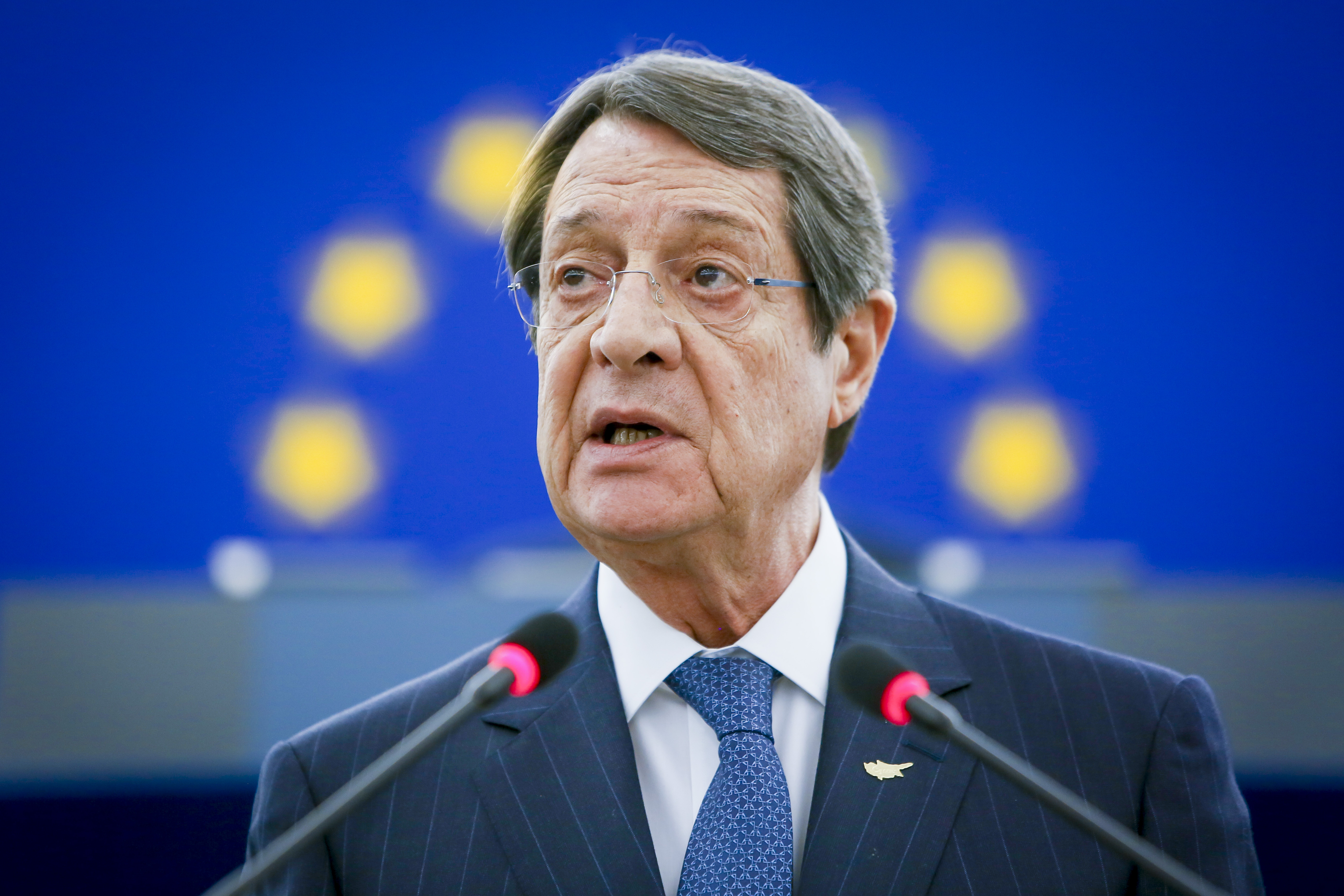
- Date formed: 13 February 2018
- Date dissolved: 28 February 2023

People and organisations
- Head of state: Nicos Anastasiades
- Head of government: Nicos Anastasiades
- Member parties: DISY
- Status in legislature: Minority government (2018–2021); Minority government (2021–2023)
- Opposition parties: AKEL; DIKO; EDEK
- Opposition leader: Andros Kyprianou (2018–2021); Stefanos Stefanou (2021–2023)

History
- Election: 2018 election
- Predecessor: Anastasiades I
- Successor: Christodoulides

The second Anastasiades government was the government of Cyprus, forming the Council of Ministers. Sworn in on 1 March 2018, it consisted of members from President Nicos Anastasiades' Democratic Rally party (DISY) and independent technocrats. Many of its members carried over from the first Anastasiades government.

== Council of Ministers ==
Key

^{§} Retained from the First Anastasiades government.

† Died in office

Office	Name	Period	Party
President	Nicos Anastasiades	28 Feb 2018 – 28 Feb 2023	DISY
Minister of Foreign Affairs	Ioannis Kasoulidis	11 Jan 2022 – 28 Feb 2023	DISY
Minister of Interior	Constantinos Petrides	1 Mar 2018 – 1 Dec 2019	DISY
Minister of Interior	Nicos Nouris	1 Dec 2019 – 28 Feb 2023	DISY
Minister of Finance	Harris Georgiades^{§}	1 Mar 2018 – 1 Dec 2019	DISY
Minister of Finance	Constantinos Petrides	1 Dec 2019 – 28 Feb 2023	DISY
Minister of Energy, Commerce, Industry and Tourism	Georgios Lakkotrypis^{§}	1 Mar 2018 – 10 July 2020	Independent
Minister of Energy, Commerce, Industry and Tourism	Vasilis Demetriades	10 July 2020 – 28 Feb 2023	DISY
Minister of Labour and Social Insurance	Zeta Emilianidou^{§ †}	1 Mar 2018 – 6 June 2022	Independent
Minister of Labour and Social Insurance	Kyriakos Kousios	27 June 2022 – 28 Feb 2023	DISY
Minister of Agriculture, Natural Resources and Environment	Costas Kadis	1 Mar 2018 – 28 Feb 2023	Independent
Minister of Education and Culture	Costas Hambiaouris	1 Mar 2018 – 1 December 2019	Independent
Minister of Education and Culture	Prodromos Prodromou	1 Dec 2019 – 28 Feb 2023	DISY
Minister of Justice and Public Order	Ionas Nicolaou^{§}	1 Mar 2018 – 31 May 2019	DISY
Minister of Justice and Public Order	George Savvides	31 May 2019 – 29 June 2020	Independent
Minister of Justice and Public Order	Emily Yiolitis	29 June 2020 – 22 June 2021	Independent
Minister of Justice and Public Order	Stefi Drakou	22 June 2021 – 28 Feb 2023	Independent
Minister of Defence	Savvas Angelides	1 Mar 2018 – 29 June 2020	Independent
Minister of Defence	Charalmbos Petrides	29 June 2020 – 28 Feb 2023	DISY
Minister of Transport, Communications and Works	Vassiliki Anastasiadou	1 Mar 2018 – 1 December 2019	Independent
Minister of Transport, Communications and Works	Yiannis Karousos	1 Dec 2019 – 28 Feb 2023	DISY
Minister of Health	Constantinos Ioannou	1 Mar 2018 – 22 June 2021	Independent
Minister of Health	Michalis Hatzipantelas	22 June 2021 – 28 Feb 2023	DISY
Government spokesman	Prodromos Prodromou	1 Mar 2018 – 1 December 2019	DISY
Government spokesman	Kyriakos Kousios	1 Dec 2019 – 22 June 2021	DISY
Government spokesman	Marios Pelekanos	22 June 2021 – 28 Feb 2023	DISY
Deputy Minister to the President	Vasilis Palmas^{§}	1 Mar 2018 – 27 June 2022	Independent
Deputy Minister to the President	Kyriakos Kousios	2 Feb 2022 – 27 June 2022	DISY
Deputy Minister to the President	Petros Demetriou	27 June 2022 – 28 Feb 2023	DISY
Deputy Minister of Shipping	Natasa Pileidou	1 Mar 2018 – 28 Feb 2023	DISY
Deputy Minister of Tourism	Savvas Perdios	Jan 2019 – 28 Feb 2023	Independent
Deputy Minister of Research, Innovation and Digital Politics	Kyriakos Kokkinos	1 Mar 2020 – 28 Feb 2023	DISY
Deputy Minister of Culture	Yiannis Toumazis	4 July 2022 – 28 Feb 2023	Independent
Deputy government spokesman	Klelia Vassiliou	1 Mar 2018 – 1 December 2019	Independent
Deputy government spokesman	Panayiotis Sentonas	1 Dec 2019 – 22 June 2021	DISY
Deputy government spokesman	Niovi Parissinou	22 June 2021 – 28 Feb 2023	Independent
