= First Anastasiades government =

Anastasiades government
- 12th Government of Cyprus

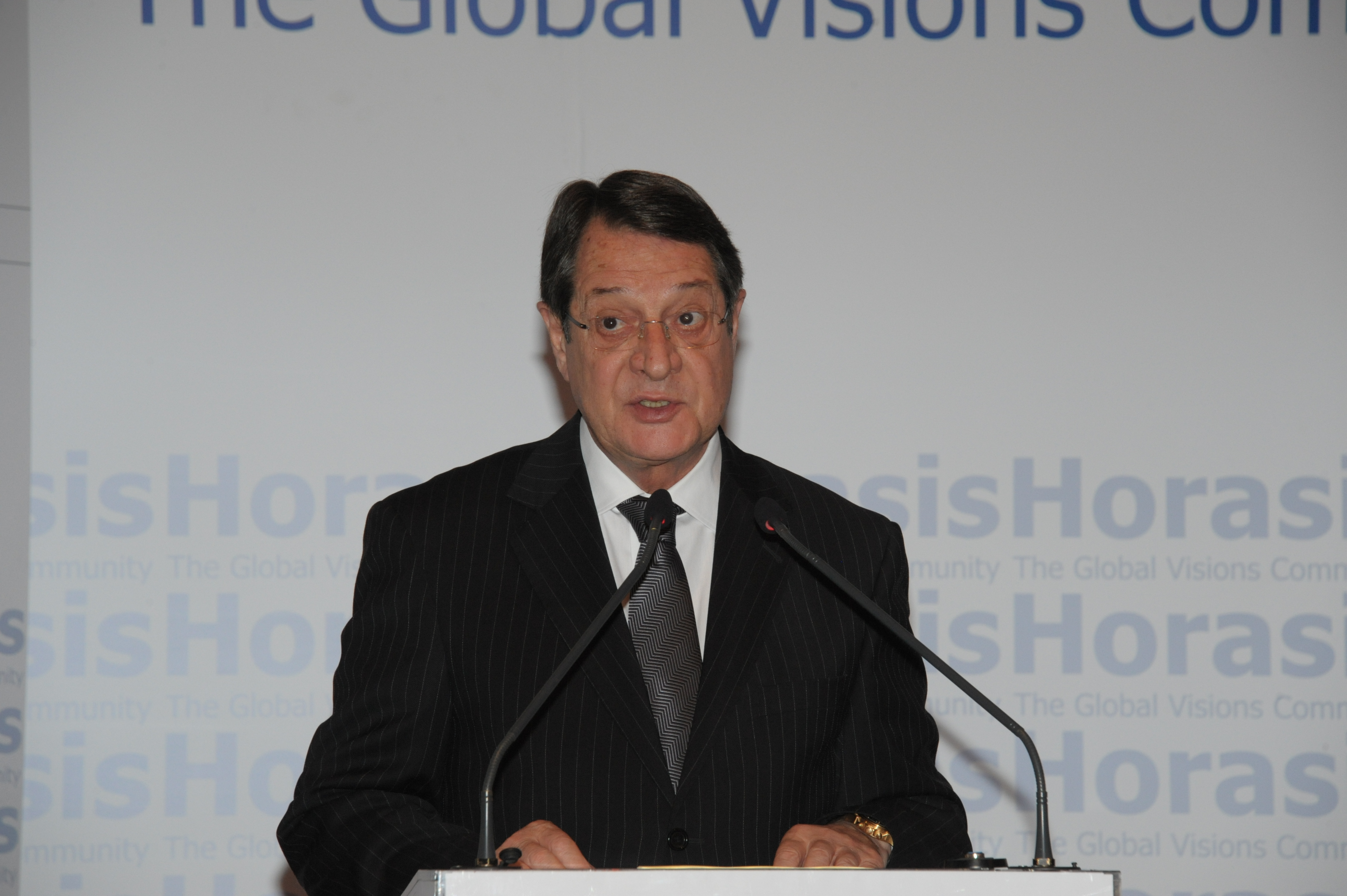
- Date formed: 28 February 2013
- Date dissolved: 4 February 2018

People and organisations
- Head of state: Nicos Anastasiades
- Head of government: Nicos Anastasiades
- Total no. of members: 14
- Member parties: DISY; DIKO (until 2014); EVROKO (until 2016)
- Status in legislature: Coalition Majority Government (2013–2014); Coalition Minority Government (2014–2016); Minority Government (2016–2018)
- Opposition parties: AKEL; EDEK; KOSP; DIKO (2014-2018); Evroko (2016-2018); SYPOL (2016-2018); KA (2016-2018); ELAM (2016-2018)
- Opposition leader: Andros Kyprianou

History
- Election: 2013 election
- Predecessor: Christofias government
- Successor: Anastasiades II

The First Anastasiades government was the government of Cyprus, forming the Council of Ministers, in 2013–2018. Sworn in on 28 February 2013, it initially consisted of 13 ministers representing a governing coalition of President Nicos Anastasiades' Democratic Rally party (DISY) with DIKO and EVROKO parties. After the withdrawal of DIKO from the coalition in 2014, the government coalition consists only of DISY and EVROKO members, as well as other, independent technocrats. Following Anastasiades' victory in the 2018 election, the Second Anastasiades government was formed, with a very similar composition.

== Council of Ministers ==
Office	Name	Period	Party
President	Nicos Anastasiades	1 Mar 2013 – 28 Feb 2018	DISY
Minister of Foreign Affairs	Ioannis Kasoulidis	1 Mar 2013 – 28 Feb 2018	DISY
Minister of Finance	Michalis Sarris	1 Mar 2013 – 2 Apr 2013	Independent
Minister of Finance	Harris Georgiades	3 Apr 2013 – 28 Feb 2018	DISY
Minister of Interior	Socratis Hasikos	1 Mar 2013 – 10 May 2017	DISY
Minister of Interior	Constantinos Petrides	11 May 2017 – 28 Feb 2018	DISY
Minister of Defence	Fotis Fotiou	1 Mar 2013 – 12 Mar 2014	DIKO
Minister of Defence	Tasos Mitsopoulos	14 Mar 2014 – 22 Mar 2014	DISY
Minister of Defence	Christoforos Fokaides	7 Apr 2014 – 28 Feb 2018	DISY
Minister of Education and Culture	Kyriakos Kenevezos	1 Mar 2013 – 12 Mar 2014	DIKO
Minister of Education and Culture	Costas Kadis	14 Mar 2014 – 28 Feb 2018	Independent
Minister of Transport, Communications and Works	Tasos Mitsopoulos	1 Mar 2013 – 14 Mar 2014	DISY
Minister of Transport, Communications and Works	Marios Demetriades	14 Mar 2014 – 28 Feb 2018	Independent
Minister of Energy, Commerce, Industry and Tourism	Georgios Lakkotrypis	1 Mar 2013 – 28 Feb 2018	DIKO/Independent
Minister of Agriculture, Natural Resources and Environment	Nicos Kouyialis	1 Mar 2013 – 28 Feb 2018	EVROKO/Independent
Minister of Labour and Social Insurance	Harris Georgiades	1 Mar 2013 – 2 Apr 2013	DISY
Minister of Labour and Social Insurance	Zeta Emilianidou	3 Apr 2013 – 28 Feb 2018	Independent
Minister of Justice and Public Order	Ionas Nicolaou	1 Mar 2013 – 28 Feb 2018	DISY
Minister of Health	Petros Petrides	1 Mar 2013 – 12 Mar 2014	DIKO
Minister of Health	Philippos Patsalis	12 Mar 2014 – 12 Jul 2015	Independent
Minister of Health	George Pamboridis	27 Jul 2015 – 28 Feb 2018	Independent
Government spokesman	Christos Stylianides	1 Mar 2013 – 14 Apr 2014	DISY
Government spokesman	Nikos Christodoulides	14 Apr 2014 – 28 Feb 2018	Independent
Vice-Minister to the President	Constantinos Petrides	1 Mar 2013 – 10 May 2017	DISY
Vice-Minister to the President	Vasilis Palmas	11 May 2017 – 28 Feb 2018	DISY
