= Demetriades =

Demetriades is a surname. Notable people with the surname include:

- Andrea Demetriades (born 1983), Australian actress
- Marios Demetriades (born 1971), Cypriot politician
- Mircea Demetriade (1861–1914), Romanian poet, playwright, and actor
- Panicos O. Demetriades (born 1959), Cypriot economist
