= Tasos Mitsopoulos =

Cypriot politician (1965–2014)

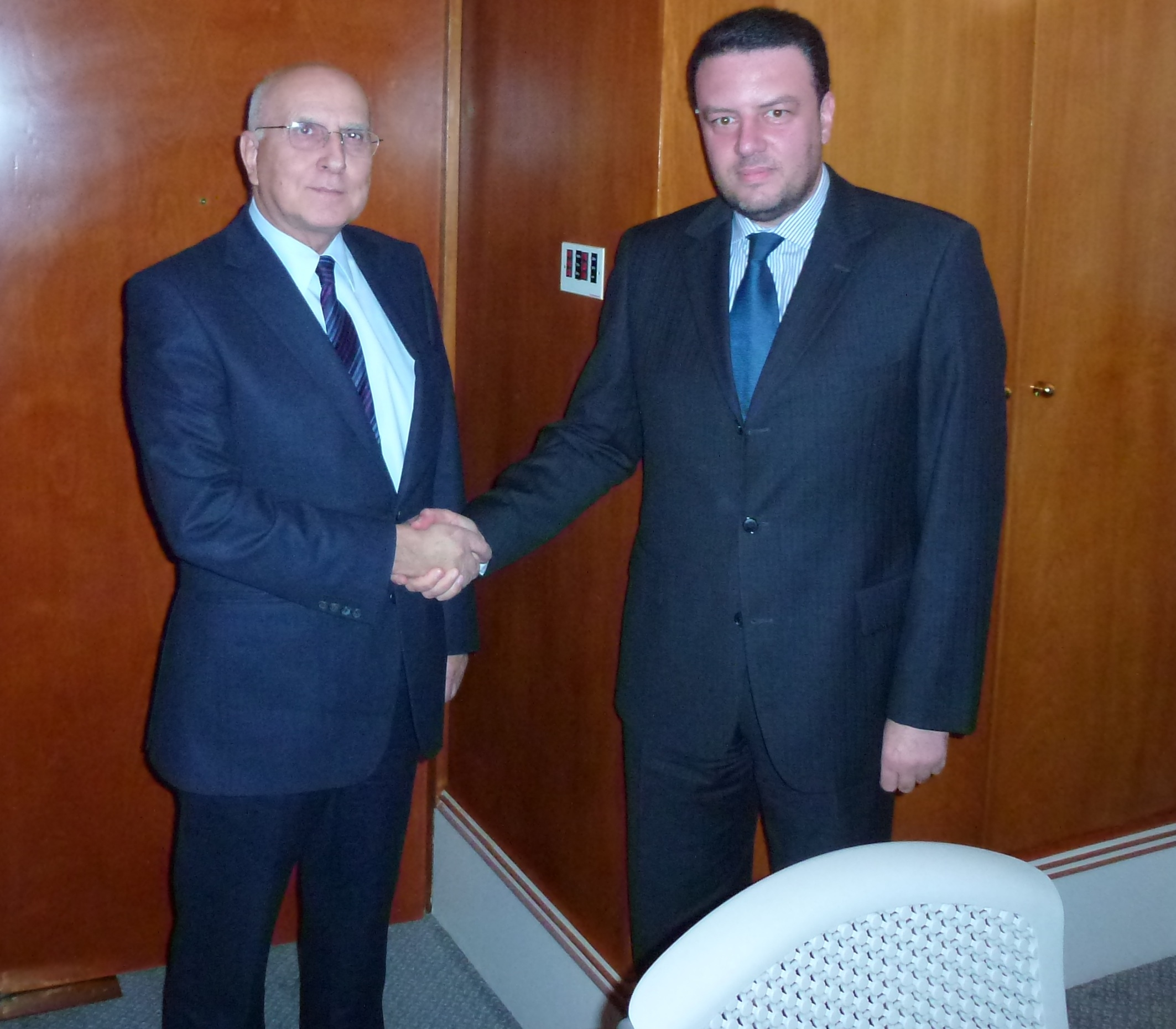
- Tasos Mitsopoulos (right)

Minister of Defence
- In office 14 March 2014 – 22 March 2014
- President: Nicos Anastasiades
- Preceded by: Photis Photiou
- Succeeded by: Christoforos Fokaides

Minister for Communications and Works
- In office 1 March 2013 – 14 March 2014
- President: Nicos Anastasiades
- Preceded by: Efthimios Flourentzou
- Succeeded by: Marios Demetriades

Member of the House of Representatives
- In office 2006–2013

Personal details
- Born: 30 May 1965 Larnaca, Cyprus
- Died: 22 March 2014 (aged 48) Nicosia, Cyprus
- Party: Democratic Rally

Tasos Mitsopoulos (Greek: Τάσος Μητσόπουλος; 30 May 1965 – 22 March 2014) was a Cypriot politician. He served as a member of the House of Representatives from 2006 until 2013 for Democratic Rally. He then joined the cabinet of Nicos Anastasiades as Minister of Communications. In a cabinet reshuffle on 14 March 2014 he was appointed Minister of Defence.

== Biography ==
Mitsopoulos was born on 30 May 1965 in Larnaca. In 1978 he joined Protoporia, the youth organisation of the political party Democratic Rally, of which he would stay member until 2000. Between 1988 and 1990 he was also part of the leadership of the Youth Organisation of New Democracy of Greece. He studied law at the National and Kapodistrian University of Athens. In Greece he also served as an adviser to Dimitris Avramopoulos and Kostis Chatzidakis.

Mitsopoulos was director of the office of Democratic Rally leader Nicos Anastasiades between 1997 and 2005, while serving as his spokesperson between 1999 and 2008. He served as a member of the House of Representatives from 2006 until 2013 representing Larnaca District for Democratic Rally. He then joined the First Anastasiades government as Minister for Communications and Works and took office on 1 March 2013, taking over from Efthimios Flourentzou. In a cabinet reshuffle by Anastasiades on 14 March 2014 he was appointed Minister of Defence, succeeding Photis Photiou, while Mitsopoulos previous portfolio was taken over by Marios Demetriades.

Mitsopoulos was found unconscious in his office on 21 March 2014, after having suffered cerebral hemorrhage due to a ruptured aneurysm. He was rushed to Nicosia New General Hospital, where he died one day later in the presence of family, friends and cabinet members, including President Anastasiades. A three-day mourning period was declared after his death. Mitsopoulos was succeeded by Christoforos Fokaides.

Mitsopoulos was married and had a son and daughter.
