= Andreas Papadopoulos =

Andreas Papadopoulos may refer to:

- Andreas Papadopoulos (sailor)
- Andreas Papadopoulos (politician)
