= Ionas Nicolaou =

Cypriot lawyer and politician

- Ιωνάς Νικολάου
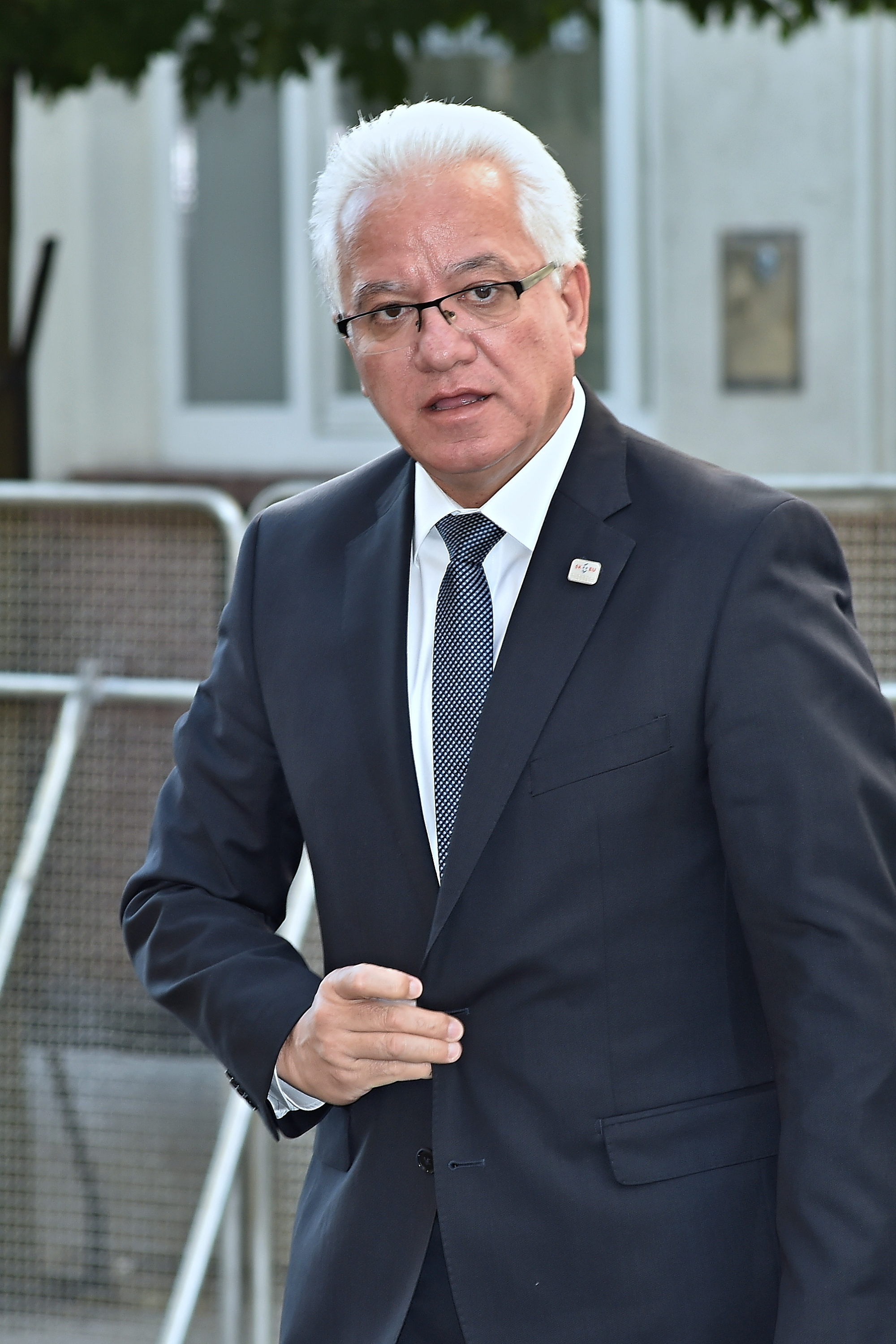

Minister of Justice and Public Order
- In office 1 March 2013 – 1 June 2019
- President: Nicos Anastasiades
- Succeeded by: George L. Savvides

Personal details
- Born: 21 January 1963 (age 63) Nicosia, Cyprus
- Party: Democratic Rally
- Education: Aristotle University of Thessaloniki

Ionas Nicolaou (Greek: Ιωνάς Νικολάου; born 21 January 1963 in Nicosia) is a Cypriot lawyer and former Democratic Rally politician. He served as Minister of Justice and Public Order during two governments, but left office on 1 June 2019 following his resignation.

== Education and career ==
Nicolaou studied law at the Aristotle University of Thessaloniki, and has a master's degree in European Union Studies. He worked as a lawyer before becoming a politician.

== Political career ==
In 2001, Nicolaou was elected to represent Nicosia in Parliament, and continued to do so until 2013. He was the chairman of the Cypriot parliament's legal affairs committee, Chairman of the Parliamentary Committee on Legal Affairs, and Member of the Parliamentary Committee on the Interior.

=== Ministerial career ===
Nicolaou was first appointed Minister of Justice and Public Order on 1 March 2013, during the first Anastasiades government. During this time, Nicolaou oversaw high-profile corruption cases, such as the CYTA land deal and pension fund allegations, for which he vowed to end impunity and "go after" anyone involved in crimes. Nicolaou oversaw the creation of a complaints committee to uphold human rights at the Menoyia (Menogeia) Immigration Detention Centre, which held its first meeting in July 2013.

Nicolaou supported the creation of deputy ministers with a focus on commercial shipping, development, and the European Union. He argued that the new deputy ministers would work with their respective ministers, but not sit in the Cabinet, so that output could be increased within the various governmental departments.

He continued to be Minister of Justice and Public Order during the second Anastasiades government, starting on 13 February 2018.

=== Resignation as minister ===
Nicolaou resigned on 2 May 2019, after accusations of police failure relating to the investigation of Nikos Metaxas, a serial killer. Officials were accused of carelessness when investigating the missing persons reports of the seven victims, due to their status as migrants. Along with his resignation, Nicolaou called for an independent inquiry into the lack of initial investigation.

Nicolaou stepped down as minister on 1 June 2019, and was succeeded by George L. Savvides. He announced he would not be returning to politics in any way, instead returning to practice law.

== Personal life ==
Nicolaou is married with two daughters.
