= Anastasiadou =

Anastasiadou is a Greek surname. Notable people with the surname include:

- Evangelia Anastasiadou (born 2002), Greek rower
- Vassiliki Anastasiadou (born 1958), Cypriot politician
