= Antonis Georgiades =

Cypriot politician

Antonis Georgiades was Minister of Communications and Works in Cyprus from 6 April 1959 to 15 August 1960.
