= Marios Demetriades =

Cypriot politician

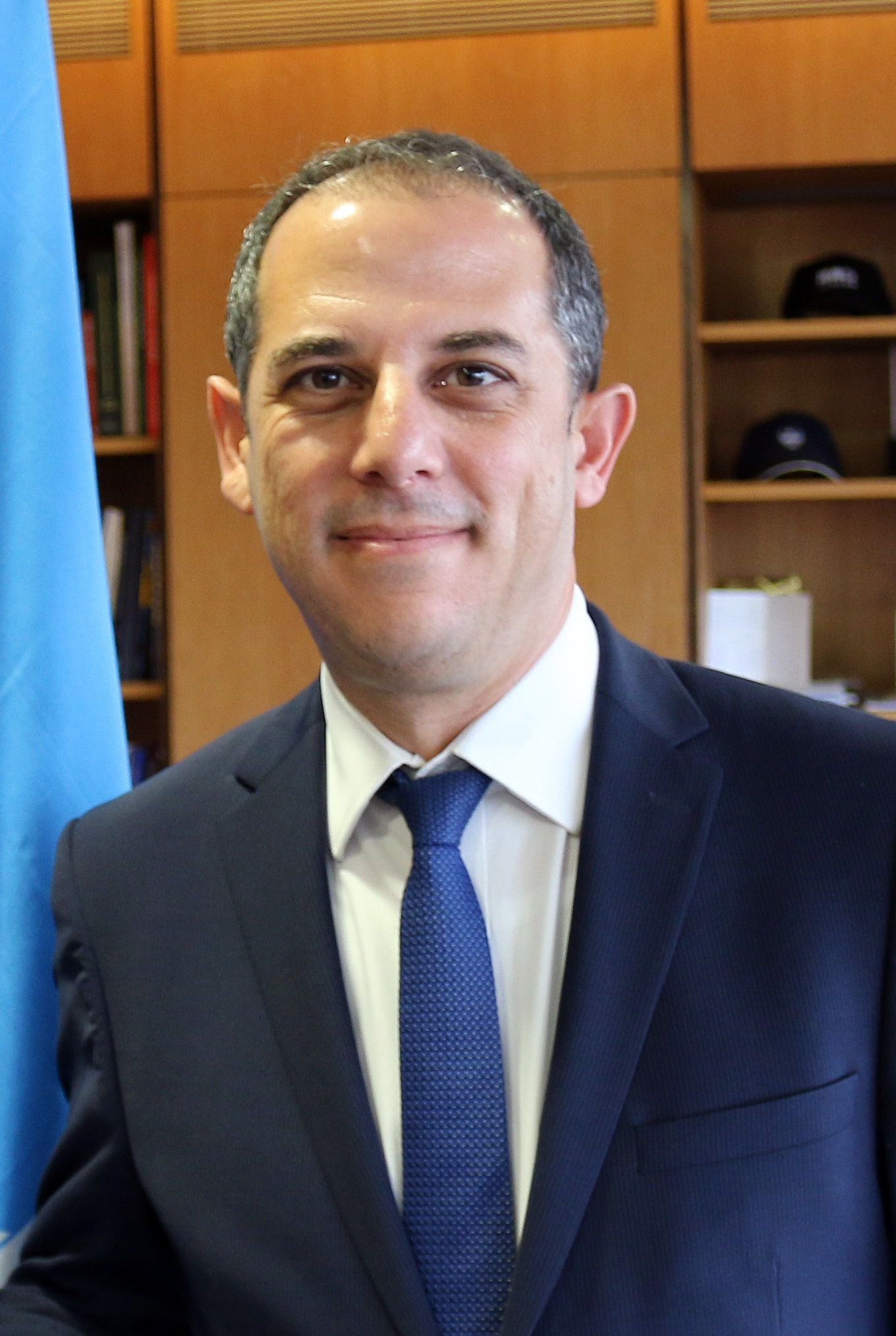

Minister of Transport, Communications and Works
- In office 14 March 2014 – 1 March 2018
- President: Nicos Anastasiades
- Preceded by: Tasos Mitsopoulos
- Succeeded by: Vassiliki Anastasiadou

Personal details
- Born: 27 August 1971 (age 55) Paphos, Cyprus
- Party: Independent
- Education: University of East Anglia

Marios Demetriades (Greek: Μάριος Δημητριάδης; born 27 August 1971) is a Cypriot politician who was appointed Minister of Transport, Communications and Works in the Council of Ministers of Cyprus on 14 March 2014.

He was born in Paphos and educated at the University of East Anglia graduating with a First Class BSc in Business, Finance and Economics in 1993. He subsequently held various positions at Piraeus Bank (Cyprus), and is a Non-Executive Director of FxPro.
