= Andreas Papadopoulos (politician) =

Cypriot politician and engineer

Andreas Papadopoulos (1922–2009) was a Cypriot politician and engineer. He was Minister of Communications and Works in Cyprus from 16 August 1960 to 20 April 1966.

== Life ==
Andreas Papadopoulos was born in Limasol in 1922. He was educated at Limmasol Greek Gymnasium and the School of Civil Engineers at Athens Technical University. After working as a civil engineer, he was appointed Minister of Communications and Works in Cyprus in 1960.
