= Vassiliki Anastasiadou =

Cypriot politician

Vassiliki Anastasiadou Βασιλική Αναστασιάδου

Minister of Transport, Communications and Works
- In office 1 March 2018 – 3 December 2019
- President: Nicos Anastasiades
- Preceded by: Marios Demetriades
- Succeeded by: Yiannis Karousos

Personal details
- Born: 3 May 1958 (age 68) Nicosia, Cyprus
- Party: Independent
- Education: National and Kapodistrian University of Athens; University of Leicester

Vassiliki Anastasiadou (Greek: Βασιλική Αναστασιάδου; born 3 May 1958), is a Cypriot politician and was the Minister of Transport, Communications and Works from 1 March 2018 in the second cabinet of Nicos Anastasiades until 3 December 2019, in a reshuffling of the cabinet.

Born in Nicosia, Anastasiadou got her degree in Laws at University of Athens and a master's degree in European Law from the University of Leicester. In her youth, Anastasiadou was an amateur singer and participated in the 1978 Commonwealth Games in Edmonton, Canada, representing Cyprus in a Song Festival. In 1983, she was appointed member of the Secretariat of the House of Representatives, becoming First Secretary. In 2002, Anastasiadou was appointed director of the European Affairs Service of the House of Representatives, which was in charge of harmonizing the European law to the Cypriot legislation for the inclusion of the country to the EU.
