= Yiannis Karousos =

Cypriot politician

- Γιάννης Καρούσος

Minister of Transport, Communications and Works
- In office 3 December 2019 – 28 February 2023
- President: Nicos Anastasiades
- Preceded by: Vassiliki Anastasiadou

Personal details
- Born: 21 November 1979 (age 46) Ayia Napa, Cyprus
- Party: Democratic Rally
- Education: University of Surrey

Yiannis Karousos or Giannis Karousos (Greek: Γιάννης Καρούσος; born 21 November 1979) is a Cypriot politician who served as Minister of Transport, Communications & Works in the Cabinet of Cyprus between 2019 and 2023. He previously served as previously served as Mayor of Ayia Napa from 2013 to 2019.

He graduated from the University of Surrey with a BSc in International Hospitality & Tourism Management in 2002, and with an MBA from ESSEC Business School & Cornell University in 2005.
