= List of ministers of Transport, Communications and Works of Cyprus =

List of ministers of communications and works of the Republic of Cyprus since independence in 1959:

Minister	Party	Began	Ended
Antonis Georgiades		6 April 1959	15 August 1960
Andreas Papadopoulos		16 August 1960	20 April 1966
Titos Fanos		21 April 1966	30 June 1970
Nikos Rousos		1 July 1970	15 June 1972
Yiangos Zamparloukos		16 June 1972	15 July 1974
Nikos Pattichis		8 August 1974	14 January 1975
Georgios Tombazos		15 January 1975	8 March 1978
Marios Eliades		9 March 1978	9 September, 1980
Georgios Hadjicostas		12 September 1980	19 April 1982
Christos Mavrellis		20 April 1982	31 July 1985
Rois Nicolaides		1 August 1985	27 February 1988
Nakos Protopapas		28 February 1988	3 May 1990
Pavlos Savvides		4 May 1990	22 November 1991
Renos Stavrakis		25 November 1991	28 February 1992
Adamos Adamides		28 February 1992	8 April 1997
Leontios Ierodiakonou		9 April 1997	7 February 1998
Leontios Ierodiakonou (Second term)		3 March 1998	24 August 1999
Averof Neophytou	DISY	25 August 1999	28 February 2003
Kikis Kazamias	AKEL	3 March 2003	14 April 2004
Giorgos Lillikas	Citizens' Alliance	25 April 2004	19 May 2004
Charis Thrasou		19 May 2004	17 July 2007
Maria Malachtou-Pampalli		16 July 2007	29 February 2008
Nicos Nicolaides	EDEK	22 February 2008	9 February 2010
Erato Kozakou-Marcoullis		2010	2011
Efthimios Flourentzou		2011	2013
Tasos Mitsopoulos	DISY	1 March 2013	14 March 2014
Marios Demetriades	Independent	14 March 2014	9 April 2015
Renamed to Ministry of Transport, Communications and Works of Cyprus
Marios Demetriades	Independent	9 April 2015	28 February 2018
Vassiliki Anastasiadou	Independent	1 March 2018	3 December 2019
Yiannis Karousos	DISY	3 December 2019	28 February 2023
Alexis Vefeades	Independent	1 March 2023	05 August 2026
Evanthia 'Evie' Tsolaki	DIKO	06 August 2026	
