= Nicos Anastasiades =

President of Cyprus from 2013 to 2023

- Νίκος Αναστασιάδης
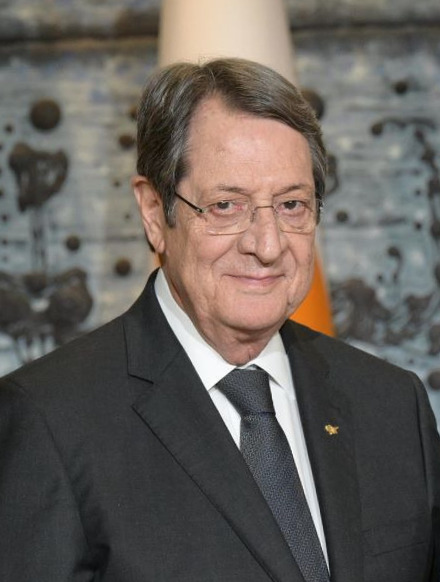
- Anastasiades in 2022

7th President of Cyprus
- In office 28 February 2013 – 28 February 2023
- Preceded by: Demetris Christofias
- Succeeded by: Nikos Christodoulides

President of the Democratic Rally
- In office 8 June 1997 – 10 May 2013
- Preceded by: Yiannakis Matsis
- Succeeded by: Averof Neofytou

Member of the Cypriot House of Representatives
- In office 4 June 1981 – 27 February 2013
- Constituency: Limassol

Personal details
- Born: 27 September 1946 (age 79) Pera Pedi, Limassol District, British Cyprus (now Cyprus)
- Party: Democratic Rally (1976–present); Centre Union (before 1977)
- Spouse: Andri Moustakoudes (m. 1971)
- Children: 2
- Education: University of Athens; University of London
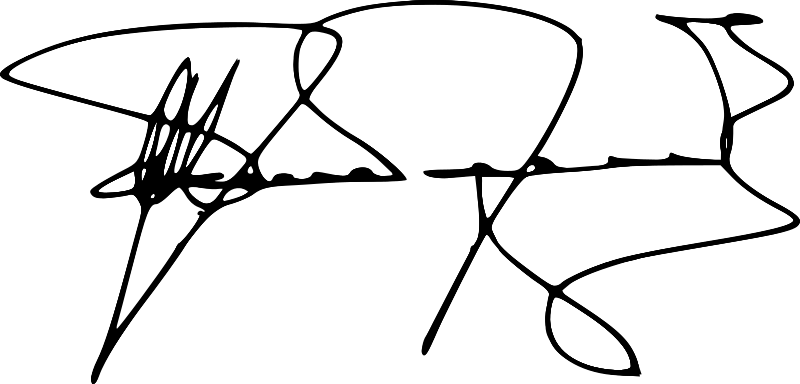
- Signature

Nicos Anastasiades (Greek: Νίκος Αναστασιάδης [ˈnikos anastasiˈaðis]; born 27 September 1946) is a Cypriot politician and businessperson, who served as the seventh president of Cyprus from 2013 to 2023. Previously, he was the leader of Democratic Rally between 1997 and 2013 and served as Member of Parliament from Limassol between 1981 and 2013.

Having served in parliament for over three decades, Anastasiades was elected to the presidency in 2013 amid a deep economic crisis. He responded by negotiating a bail-out agreement with the Troika group, consisting of the European Commission, European Central Bank and International Monetary Fund. This required the island to generally cut public spending, though his administration remediated this by attracting significant foreign investment and then increasing the minimum wage, improving the economy. He was re-elected in 2018.

Anastasiades' foreign policy involved the greatest unification talks since 2004, but ultimately failed to reach an agreement. Another considerable legacy of his presidency is his longstanding relationship with Russia, dating back prior to his election due to his law firm that focussed on Russian clientele. Anastasiades signed several agreements to promote closer economic and financial ties with Moscow, turning Cyprus into a vehicle for Russian oligarchs to register their assets there and avoid international sanctions implemented since 2014. Coupled with the controversial investment-for-citizenship program, this created a perception of corruption, something that his supporters have denied, and he reversed his policies drastically following the Russian invasion of Ukraine. He was mentioned in the Panama Papers, Troika Laundromat, and Cyprus Papers leaks.

== Early life and education ==
Nicos Anastasiades was born in the village of Pera Pedi on 27 September 1946 to a Greek Cypriot family. He graduated in law from the National and Kapodistrian University of Athens and completed postgraduate studies in shipping law at the University of London. During his university studies, he was a member of the Centre Coalition based in Athens formed by Georgios Papandreou.

== Law career ==
Anastasiades is a lawyer by profession, and the founder of law firm "Nicos Chr. Anastasiades & Partners". The firm provided offshore services and aided in particular Russian clients. Partners in the law firm were officials of shell companies linked to suspected money laundering operations, including for allies of Vladimir Putin. After Anastasiades took office as president, he left the firm in the hands of his two daughters and partners. The law firm has denied any wrongdoing and Anastasiades has said that he has had no active involvement in the firm since 1997.

== Early political career ==
Anastasiades was first elected to the House of Representatives in 1981 with the Democratic Rally and remained an MP until 2013, when he resigned in order to assume his duties as President of Cyprus. He was the leader of his party from 1997 to 2013.

== Presidency ==
=== Elections ===
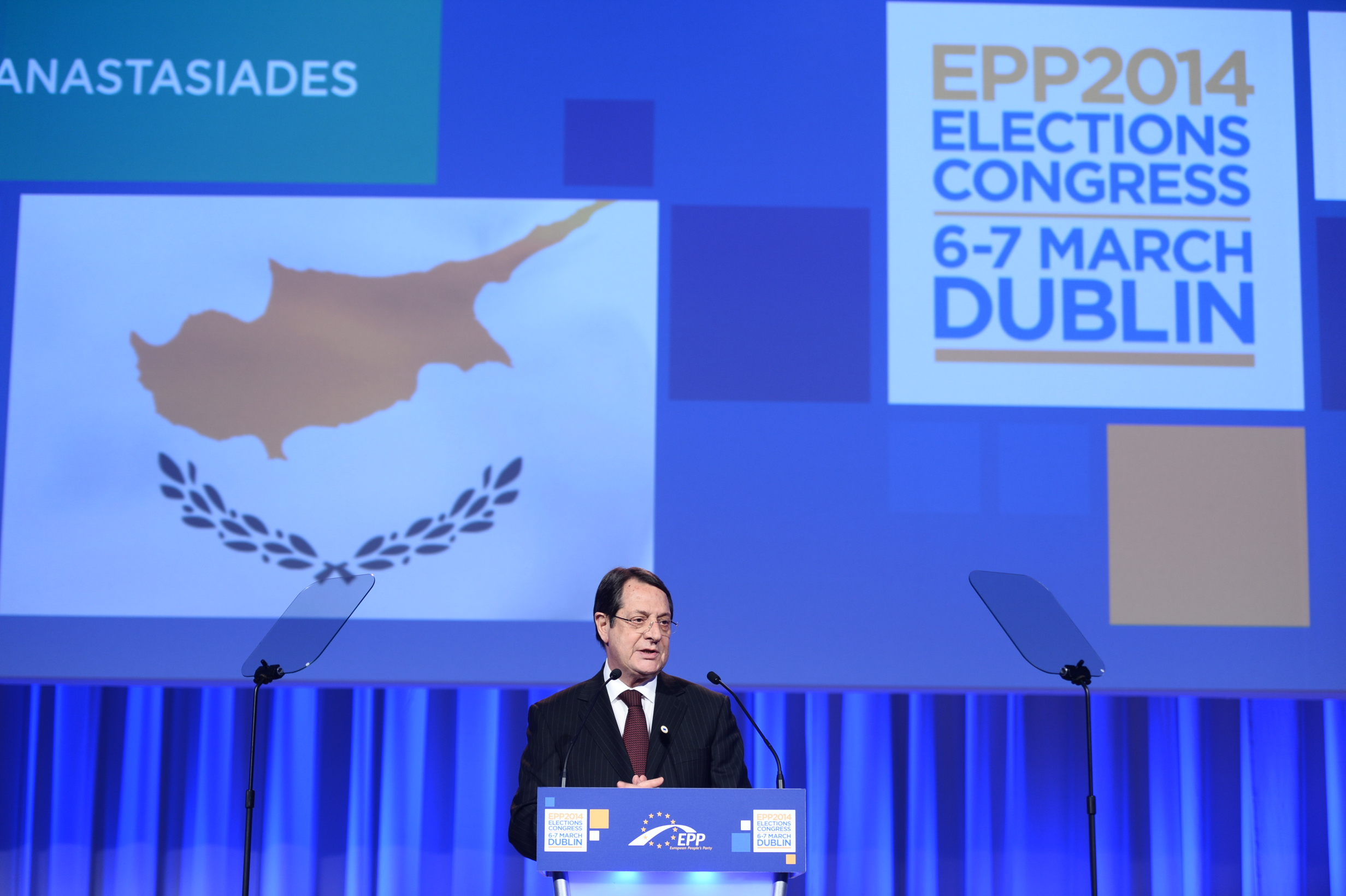
Anastasiades in Dublin in March 2014

In March 2012, Nicos Anastasiades was nominated as a candidate for the 2013 presidential election, against his rival MEP Eleni Theocharous in a vote among the 1,008 strong executive of the Democratic Rally. Nicos Anastasiades received 673 votes (86.73%) and Theocharous received 103 (13.27%). In the first round of the presidential election on 17 February 2013, Anastasiades won 45% of votes, while Stavros Malas and George Lillikas earned 26.9% and 24.9%, respectively. He won in the second round against Malas with 57.48% of the vote and was sworn in as president on 28 February 2013.

In a repeat of the previous election, he once again beat Malas in 2018.

=== Economy ===
==== Banking bail-out ====
In 2013, upon assuming office, Anastasiades inherited a critical economic crisis triggered by a combination of factors, including a persistent budget deficit, an outgrown and problematic banking sector representing 750 percent of GDP in 2010, and the fallout from a property boom.

Collaborating with the European Union and the International Monetary Fund, Anastasiades finalized a crucial bailout agreement in Brussels to prevent the bankruptcy of Cyprus' main banks and avoid a potential euro exit. The agreement, signed off by the Eurogroup after extensive negotiations, involved significant measures to stabilize the country's financial system.

The deal required Anastasiades to break campaign promises, agreeing to allow banks to confiscate 47.5 percent of bank accounts over 100,000 euros to secure a 10-billion euro bailout from international lenders. Speaking before a committee of inquiry into the island's economic collapse, Anastasiades conceded he reneged on his pledges not to accept a "haircut" on deposits, stressing that the alternative would have been catastrophic for Cyprus.

He later came to comment that Cyprus was treated as a guinea pig with extreme measures never applied before, but despite his counter-proposals they were all blatantly rejected during the Eurogroup meeting. However, such claims were heavily criticized on the press for being misleading, citing references from Eurogroup's members who stated that the bailout plan was actually Anastasiades's proposal. Additional criticism was due to claims that the president himself warned his associates and friends to move money abroad before financial crisis hit.

Despite the heavy criticism, the government's effective management of capital controls revived the country's banking system, and Cyprus was able to exit the bailout in 2016. Annual average real GDP growth from 2018 to 2022 was 4.6%, and the economy rebounded impressively in 2021 with a growth rate of 9.9%. Government achievements include bringing national debt down to 85% of GDP by 2023, and paying off Cyprus' IMF debt ahead of schedule, providing fiscal space for sustainable investments.

==== Closure of Cyprus Popular Bank ====
As part of the bailout agreement, Cyprus Popular Bank (Laiki Trapeza), the nation's second-largest lender, underwent a swift resolution process. Guaranteed deposits under 100,000 euros were transferred to a "good bank," while non-performing loans and uninsured deposits went to a "bad bank," resulting in losses for bondholders and shareholders totaling 4.2 billion euros. The "good bank" was subsequently merged with Bank of Cyprus, the largest lender, where uninsured deposits faced a haircut to achieve a 9 percent capital ratio. Uninsured depositors, including pension funds, received equity in the recapitalization process. Additionally, the agreement mandated the Bank of Cyprus to absorb the 9 billion euros of Emergency Liquidity Assistance initially provided by the European Central Bank to Laiki Trapeza, with expectations of ongoing liquidity support from the ECB.

Laiki Trapeza succumbed to financial woes stemming from significant losses, notably a 1.8 billion euro deficit in the first nine months of 2012 and an additional 4.1 billion euros the year before, fueled by ill-fated investments in Greek bonds and questionable lending decisions. The demise of Laiki Trapeza, a 112-year-old institution, marked a somber chapter in Cyprus's economic history, impacting its banking landscape and the lives of the bank's 8,400 workers.

==== Closure of Cyprus Airways ====
On 9 January 2015, Cyprus Airways, the island's flag carrier with 67 years of history, faced a sudden closure following a European Commission ruling that declared the airline's receipt of €100 million in state aid, provided during the Demetris Christofias' government, as illegal. President Nicos Anastasiades played a pivotal role in managing the aftermath, expressing regret over the airline's closure and taking steps to address the concerns of the 560 dismissed employees. He pledged full compensation, acknowledged the government's financial contribution to provident funds, and assured support for the establishment of a new airline.

In July 2016, Anastasiades's government announced that Charlie Airlines Ltd, a Cypriot start-up and subsidiary of Russia's S7 airline, emerged as the winning bidder to use the Cyprus Airways brand for ten years. This strategic move aimed to revive the legacy of the historic airline. The agreement signified the government's commitment to economic revitalization, job creation, and enhanced flight connectivity for Cyprus, aligning with the island's recovery efforts.

Today, Cyprus Airways operates flights to 19 key airports, with a program of 58 weekly flights, offering over 342,454 seats. The airline aims to facilitate year-round connectivity, focusing on core markets and serving as a point-to-point carrier, with plans to double its Airbus A220 fleet in early 2024 to support expansion.

==== Closure of Cyprus Cooperative Bank ====
Nicos Anastasiades faced criticism over his involvement in the closure of the Cyprus Cooperative Bank (CCB). The troubles for CCB began in 2013, when the bank, grappling with a high non-performing loan ratio of 57%, encountered difficulties in recovering funds from its significant portfolio of non-performing loans. Despite a recapitalization effort in 2014 involving €1.5 billion in state funds, followed by an additional injection of €175 million in the subsequent year, the bank remained insolvent and unsustainable. In 2018, the European Central Bank's Single Supervisory Mechanism compelled the winding-up of CCB's operations, leading to the bank's split into 'good' and 'bad' banks. The operating bank network was sold to Hellenic Bank, and non-performing assets were transferred to a new institution, called Kedipes (Cyprus Asset Management Company).

During the collapse of the CCB, President Nicos Anastasiades and then Finance Minister Harris Georgiades faced scrutiny for their roles. An investigation revealed inadequate communication about a proposed rescue plan, leading to delays and the eventual inability to rescue the bank. Despite a substantial recapitalization, the CCB's failure highlighted challenges stemming from mismanagement and a burden of non-performing loans amounting to €7.5 billion. Blame was primarily directed at Georgiades, who bore the heaviest responsibility, according to a Committee of Inquiry. President Anastasiades faced criticism for retaining Georgiades, impeding decisive action, and the blame-passing narrative extended to Co-op's General Director, Nicholas Hadjiyiannis. The intricate web of political intervention, weak corporate governance, and insufficient measures to reduce non-performing loans contributed to the bank's demise.

Michael Sarris, who served as Cyprus' Finance Minister under Anastasiades' government from March to April 2013, reflected on the closure of the Cyprus Cooperative Bank (CCB) and identified critical lapses that contributed to the bank's demise. Sarris emphasised the lack of urgency and strategic missteps by the Christofias' government during the 2013 financial crisis. He criticized the delayed agreement with the EU, citing the government's reluctance and underscoring the detrimental impact of a €2.5 billion loan from Russia. Sarris also highlighted the ill-fated decisions of Cypriot banks, particularly their significant exposure to Greek debt. Concerning the CCB, he underscored the romanticized perception of the Cooperative movement and the lack of supervision, deeming it a regrettable historical oversight.

==== Minimum wage implementation ====
President Anastasiades took a significant step in Cyprus by introducing a minimum wage, a provision that was absent before. The decision was made clear before the end of July 2022, with a meeting chaired by the president on 5 July, involving the then Minister of Labour Kyriakos Kousios, employer representatives (KEVE and OEB), and trade unions (SEK, PEO, and DEOK).

The implementation of the minimum wage escalated tensions between labor unions and employers. Nikos Anastasiades, having received the completed proposal from Labor Minister Kyriakos Kousios, witnessed a crucial meeting on 31 August 2022. Disagreements persisted, particularly regarding the connection between the minimum wage and designated working hours. Unions advocated for a fixed hourly rate, while employers emphasised flexibility. Kousios, determined to resolve the matter promptly, addressed economic challenges such as the ongoing COVID-19 pandemic, the Russian invasion of Ukraine, and inflation. The scheduled implementation date was set at 1 January 2023, with a contingency plan for dispute resolution involving the president.

The new decree, effective from 1 January 2023, established a monthly minimum wage of €940 (gross) for full-time employment, with specific provisions for the initial six months and considerations for part-time workers. This legislative milestone benefited around 40,000 low-wage workers, though unions emphasised the importance of vigilant implementation and expressed their commitment to seeking improvements in the new regulation.

==== Public spending ====
He pledged to implement the Structural Reforms demanded by the European Commission in order to obtain economic aid and cut social benefits, pensions and wages in the public and private sectors, while increasing VAT and fuel taxes. He also decided to reduce the number of civil servants.

=== Transition from conscription to a professional military ===
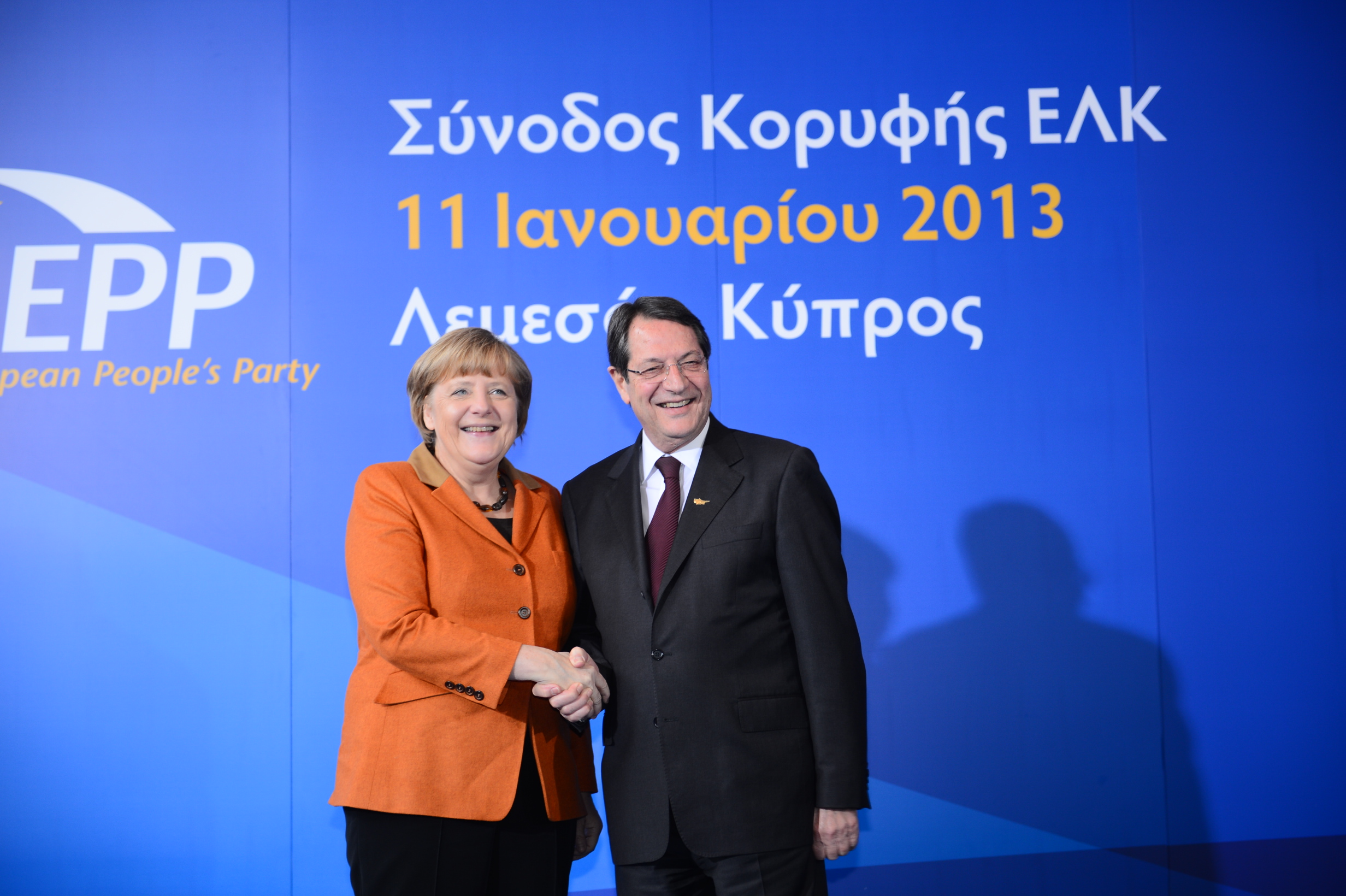
Angela Merkel with Anastasiades in 2013 at the EPP summit in Limassol

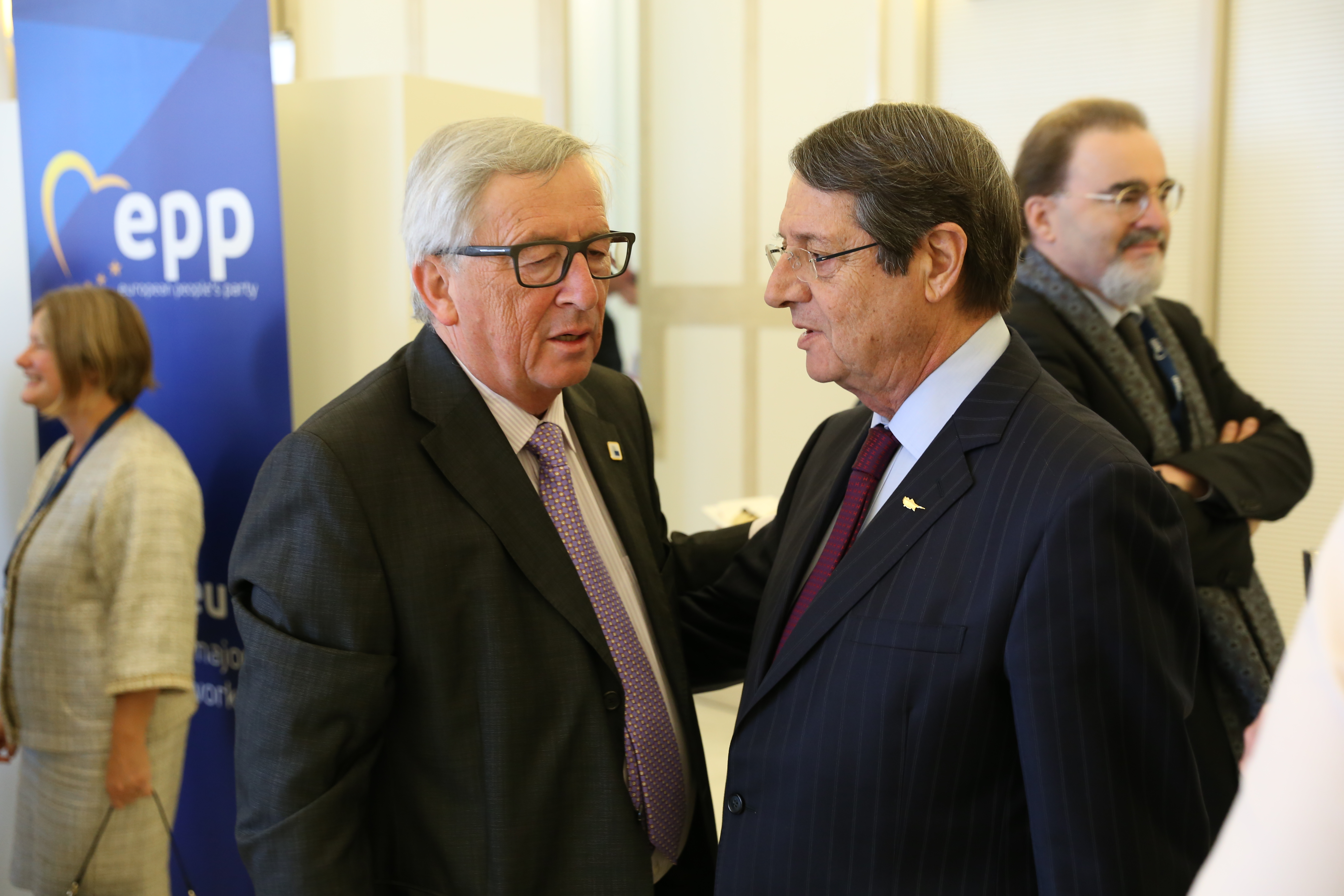
President of the European Commission Jean-Claude Juncker with Anastasiades in 2016 at the EPP summit in Maastricht

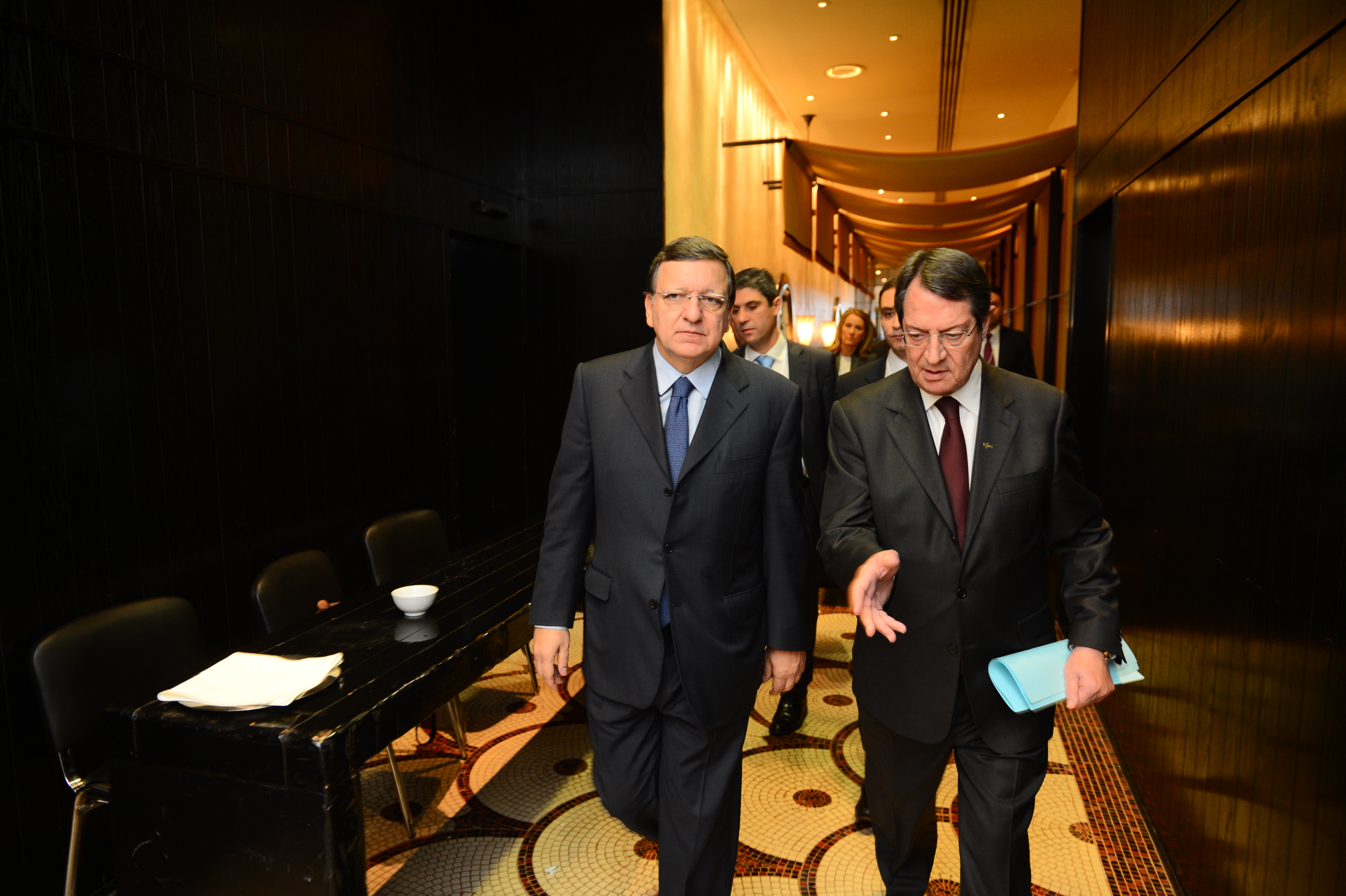
José Manuel Barroso (left) and Anastasiades in January 2013 in Cyprus

During his electoral campaign for the post of Cyprus President in 2013, he announced his commitment to reduce military conscription in Cyprus to 14 months during the first hundred days of his term. During the early months of the Anastasiades administration there was important planning for the reduction of military conscription to 14 months in order to increase the incentive for 18 year olds to serve their conscription and to reduce the financial burden to the Cypriot state. Minister of Defence Fotis Fotiou announced that there would be a final decision on the reduction of military conscription towards late 2013. There was increasing pressure for ending military conscription due to the 2012–13 Cypriot financial crisis.

In early August 2013, Minister of Defence Fotis Fotiou announced the reduction of military service, which was in the electoral manifesto of Anastasiades. He supported that national service will be reduced to 18 months in the first phase and decrease further to 14 months before the end of 2014. On 25 February 2016, it was decided by the cabinet to reduce the military service to 18 months for all conscripts who joined in the summer of 2015, and to reduce the service to 14 months for all those who joined thereafter.

As part of these proposals to professionalise the National Guard, President Anastasiades introduced the contracted soldiers "Συμβασιούχοι Οπλίτες (ΣΥΟΠ)" whose role is to mainly cover the operational needs of the National Guard now that the military service was reduced to up to 14 months, an initiative which has been considered to be successful.

=== Cyprus problem ===
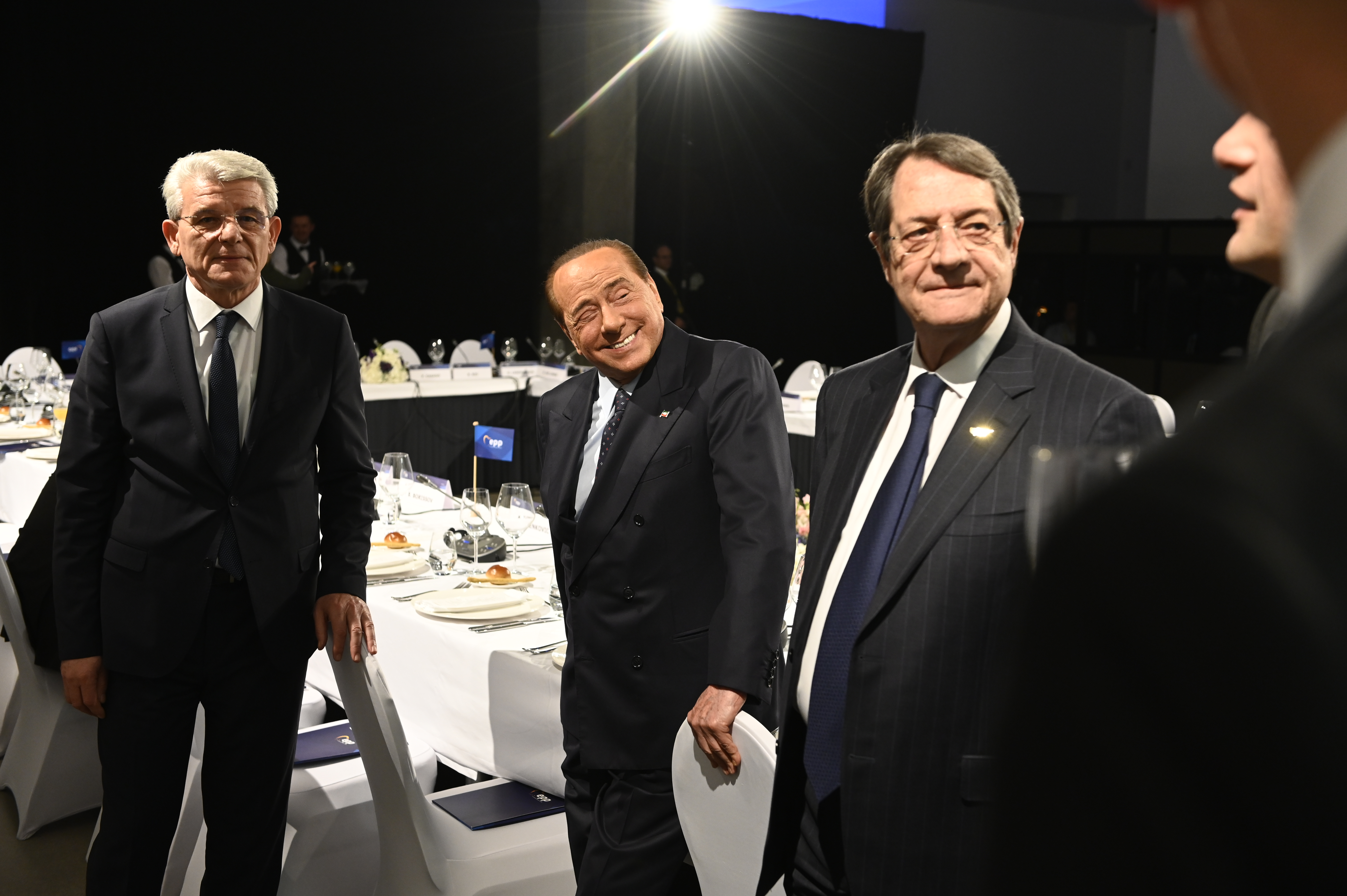
Anastasiades alongside former Italian Prime Minister Silvio Berlusconi (middle) and Bosnian Presidency member Šefik Džaferović (left) in November 2019.

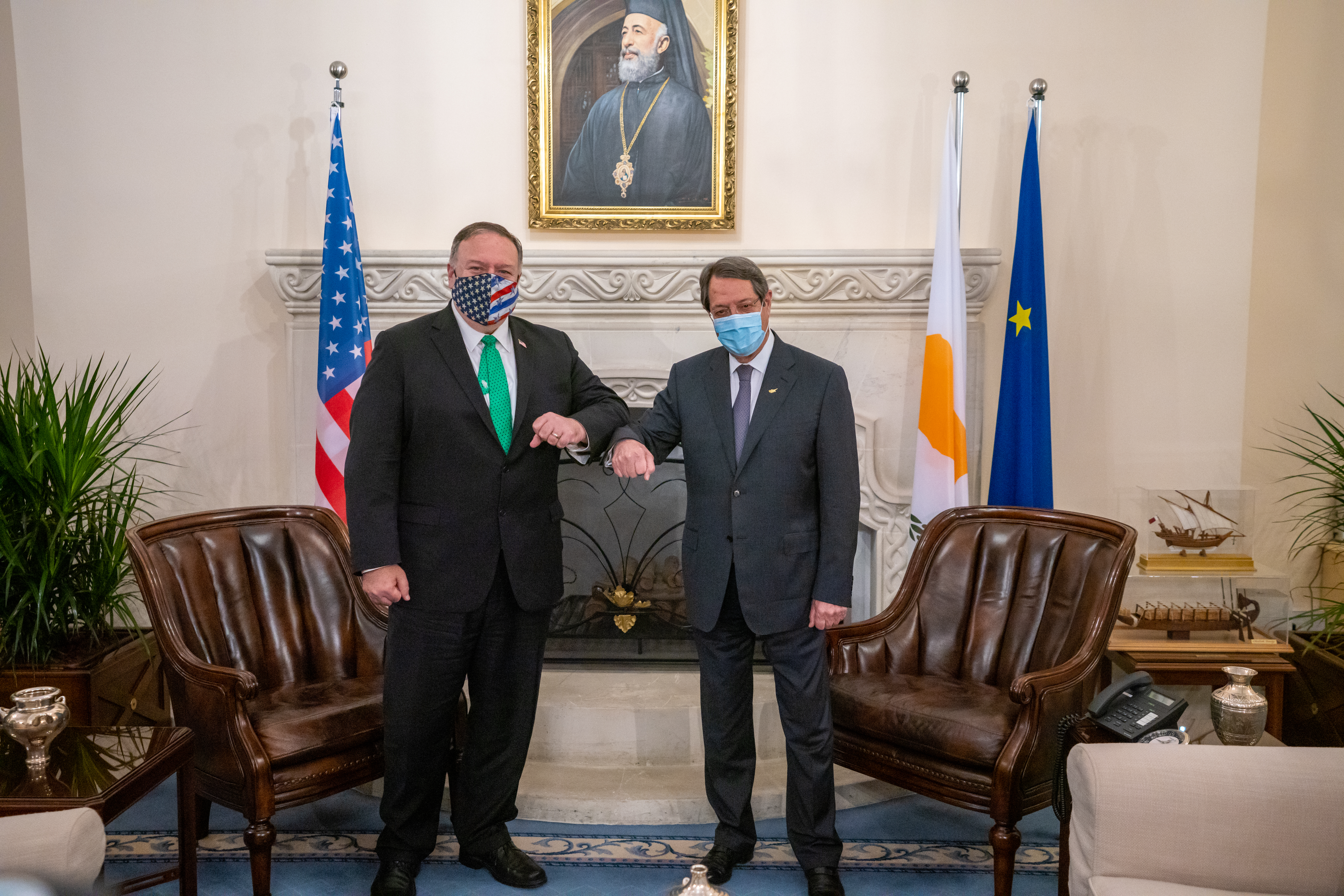
Anastasiades with U.S. Secretary of State Mike Pompeo in Nicosia, 12 September 2020

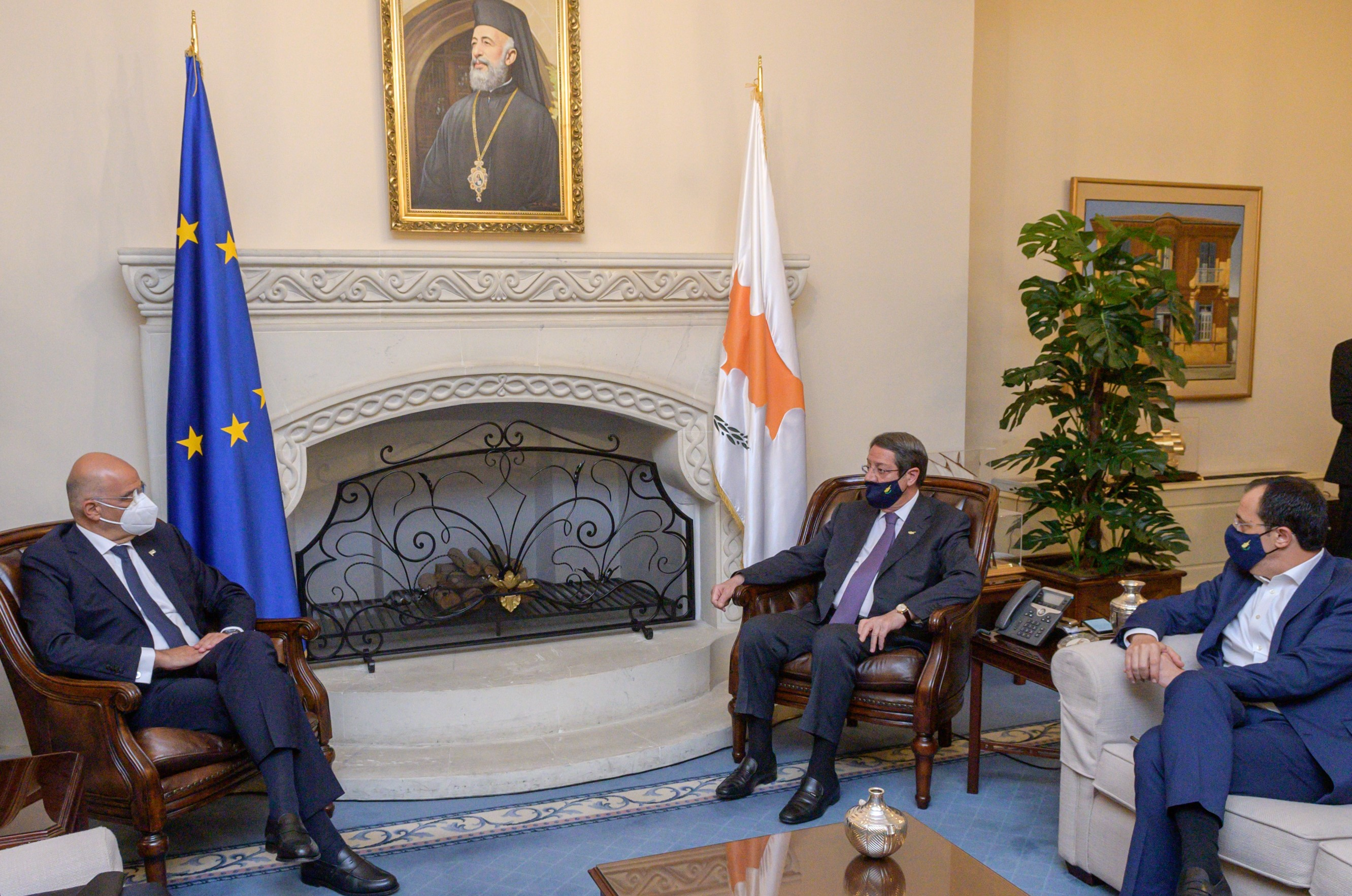
Anastasiades with Greek Foreign Minister Nikos Dendias in Nicosia, 21 July 2021

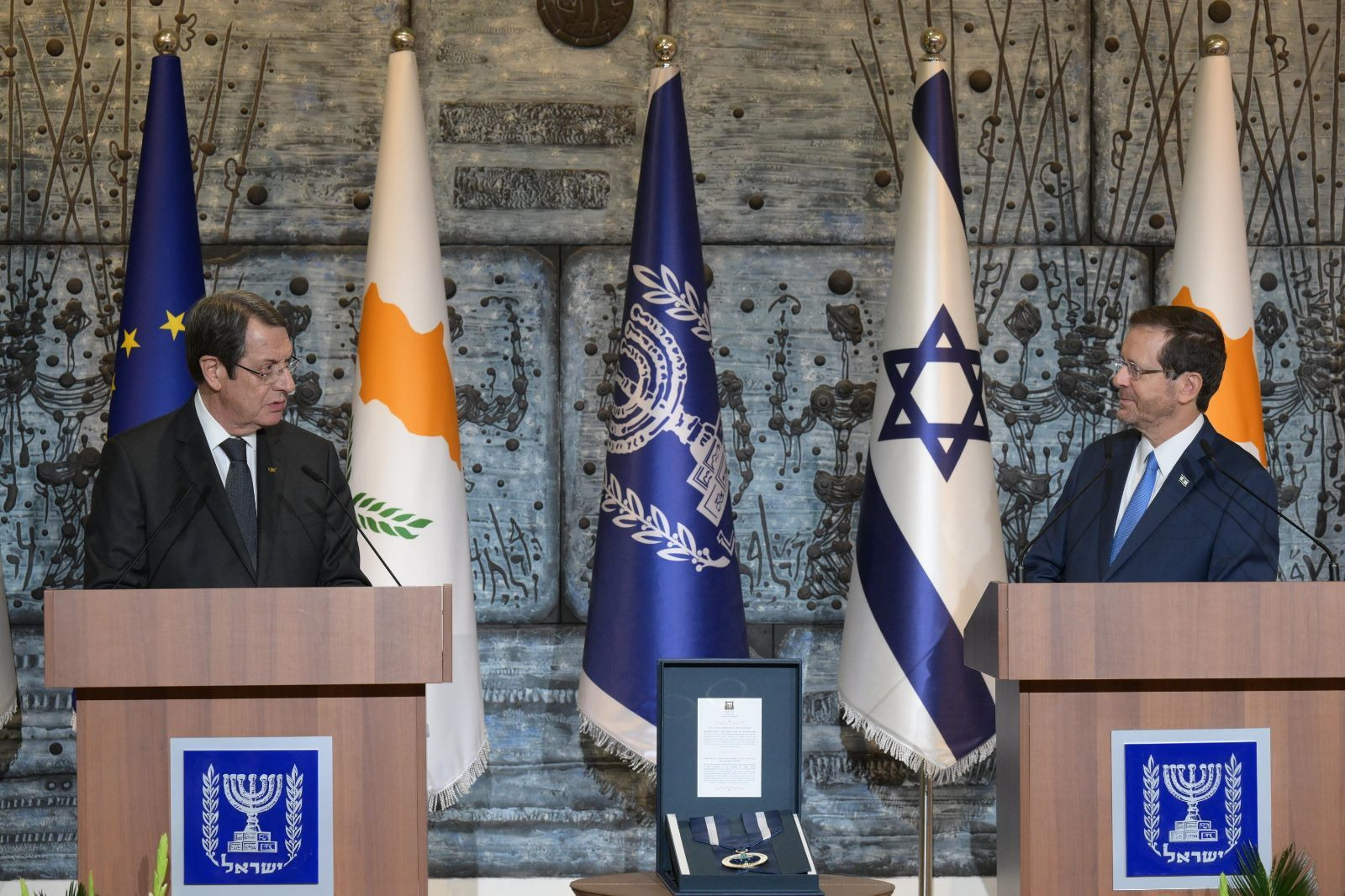
Anastasiades with Israel's President Isaac Herzog in Jerusalem in November 2022. In the background is an Israeli volcanic ash artwork.

Anastasiades supported the Annan Plan for the reunification of Cyprus, even though a majority (61%) of his party voted it down. Some of his intra-party opposition even called for Anastasiades to step down. Many party cadres were up in arms over Anastasiades' letter to the European Parliament alleging that the government trampled on free speech and human rights during the referendum's "Yes" campaign. The government cited the National Television Council's data that showed that the six parties supporting the "No" vote got as much air time as the two that supported the UN plan. The start of peace negotiations between Anastasiades and his Turkish Cypriot counterpart began in October 2013, attracting the interest of international media and world leaders including Barack Obama.

==== Mont Pèlerin talks ====
In November 2016, negotiations for a comprehensive agreement on the Cyprus issue took place between Anastasiades and Turkish Cypriot leader Mustafa Akıncı at the Mont Pèlerin resort in Switzerland, under the auspices of the United Nations. Negotiation conditions were favourable, yielding several positive outcomes, especially in the territorial debate, where Greek Cypriots secured substantial land percentages. Nevertheless, the talks concluded due to a lack of convergence on criteria for territorial adjustment, with Akıncı proposing 29.2% and Anastasiades insisting on 28%.

Anastasiades faced criticism for his decision to interrupt the conference and return to Cyprus for further consultations, especially with the Greek government. In contrast, Akıncı insisted on continuing the conference without interruption. Despite efforts, no compromise was reached on the duration of the interruption, resulting in the withdrawal of the Greek Cypriot delegation from Mont Pèlerin.

==== Crans-Montana talks ====
The Crans-Montana talks, which unfolded in a Swiss mountaintop resort in the summer of 2017, between Anastasiades and Turkish Cypriot leader Mustafa Akıncı (as well as Greece, Turkey, the U.K., the United Nations, and the European Union) negotiated the reunification of Cyprus. There was considerable optimism among observers about the potential of the Crans-Montana talks to resolve the Cyprus dispute.

The Crans-Montana talks faced a critical setback, further complicating the already challenging negotiations for the reunification of Cyprus. The pivotal issue revolved around the Guterres framework, a proposal introduced by UN Secretary-General Antonio Guterres on 30 June 2017. A subsequent meeting on 4 July aimed to clarify certain aspects of this framework, yet controversy emerged regarding the "missing minutes" of this crucial session. President Nicos Anastasiades insisted that the 4 July meeting's minutes were the definitive record, rendering the informal 30 June framework obsolete. The absence of these minutes became a point of contention, with Anastasiades asserting that without them, the Guterres framework could not be included in the terms of reference for future negotiations. The Turkish Cypriot side argued that acceptance of the Guterres framework, as presented on 30 June, without modifications, could lead to a strategic package agreement. The validity of Anastasiades' claim was questioned, as it was suggested that substantive changes were not made during the 4 July meeting. The dispute over the minutes, whether genuine or perceived, contributed to the breakdown of talks.

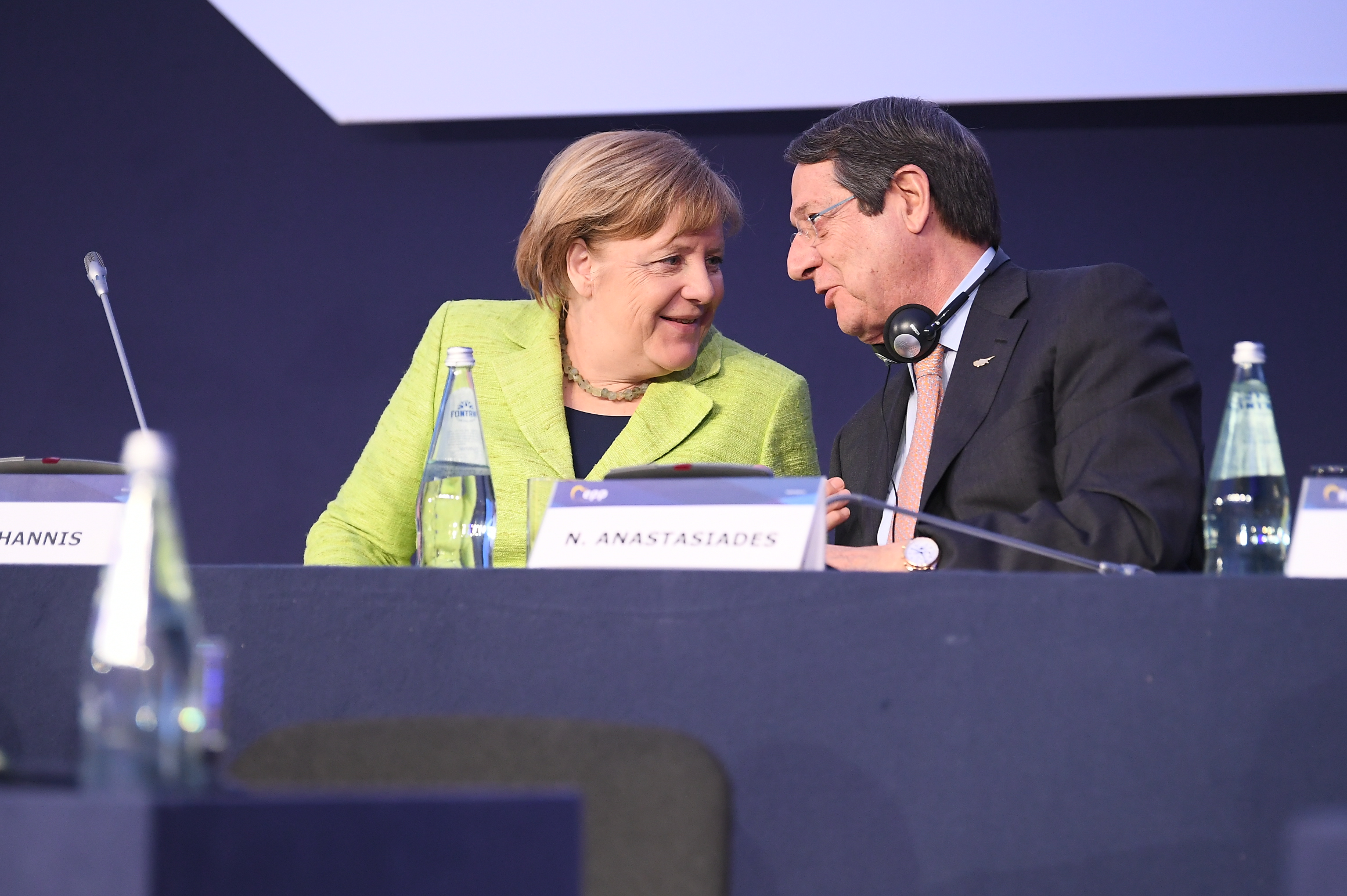
Anastasiades with Merkel at the EPP Malta Congress, on 29 March 2017

The Guterres Framework encompassed crucial elements addressing political, territorial, property, equivalent treatment, and security aspects. It proposed political equality through a rotating presidency with a 2:1 ratio, ensuring fair representation. In terms of territory, adjustments were suggested, requiring a revision of the Turkish Cypriots' map to address concerns raised by Greek Cypriots about specific locations. The property provisions included two regimes—one prioritizing dispossessed owners in adjusted areas and another favoring current users in remaining regions. Equivalent treatment involved measures for the free movement of goods, services, and capital, as well as considerations for tourists, students, and seasonal workers. The security and guarantees aspect aimed to replace the right of intervention with mutually agreed-upon monitoring mechanisms and outlined the gradual reduction of existing troops, with troop-related matters to be discussed at the highest level when appropriate.

==== Further developments ====
In October 2022, Anastasiades condemned the European Union's "double standards" and "tolerance" toward Turkey, arguing that "Interests cannot take precedence over principles and values. We cannot say that we are currently making sacrifices to help Ukraine – and rightly so – to cope with the illegal invasion and violation of its territorial integrity and, at the same time, we put our interests first in our relations with Turkey."

=== Foreign policy ===
==== Tripartite regional cooperation between Cyprus, Greece and Egypt ====
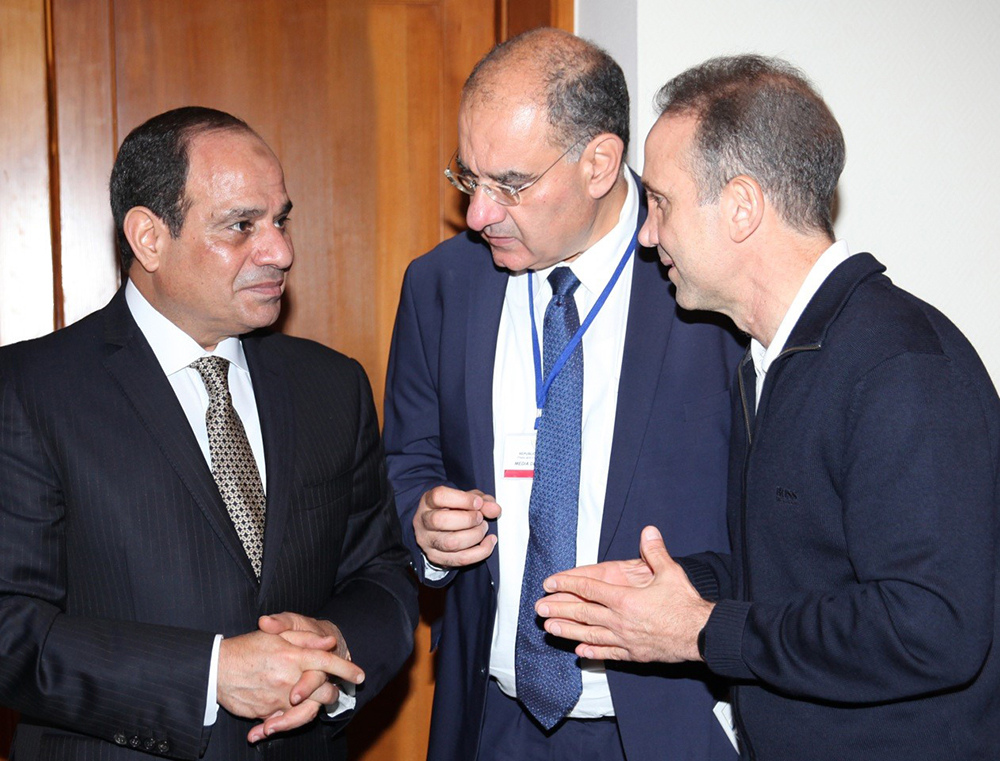
Nicosia meeting on 20 November 2017. Egyptian President Abdel Fattah el-Sisi (left) gave full support to CEO EuroAfrica Interconnector Nasos Ktorides.

On 8 November 2014, Anastasiades, President Abdel-Fattah el-Sisi of Egypt, and then Prime Minister of Greece Antonis Samaras convened in Cairo for the first trilateral summit between the three countries. They established a trilateral partnership committed to promoting peace, stability, and prosperity across various domains. Trilateral Summits between the three countries were a regular occurrence during Anastasiades' presidency.

==== Tripartite regional cooperation between Cyprus, Greece and Israel ====
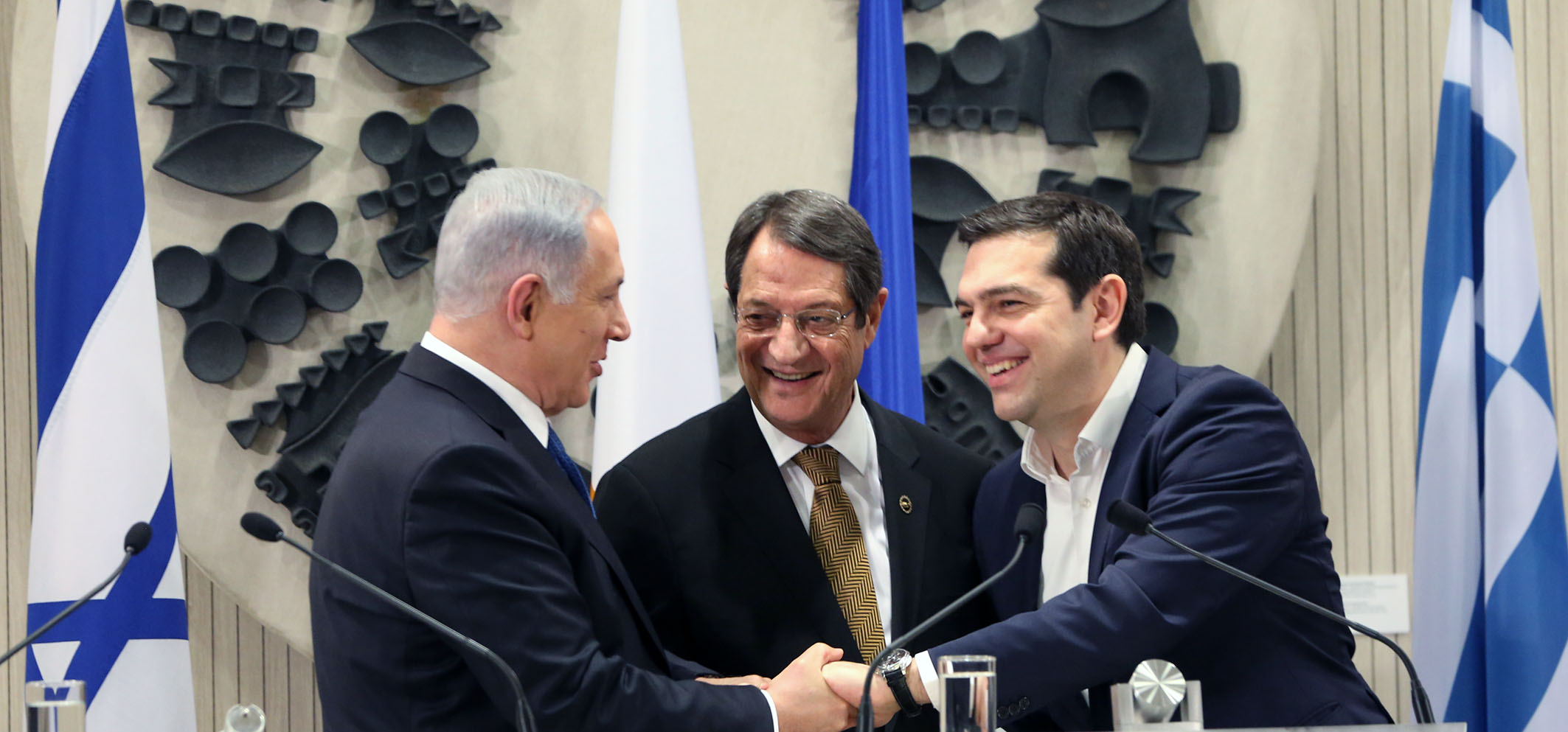
Israeli Prime Minister Benyamin Netanyahu, Cyprus President Nicos Anastasiades and Greek Prime Minister Alexis Tsipras meeting in Nicosia on Jan 28, 2016 affirmed their full support for the EuroAsia Interconnector

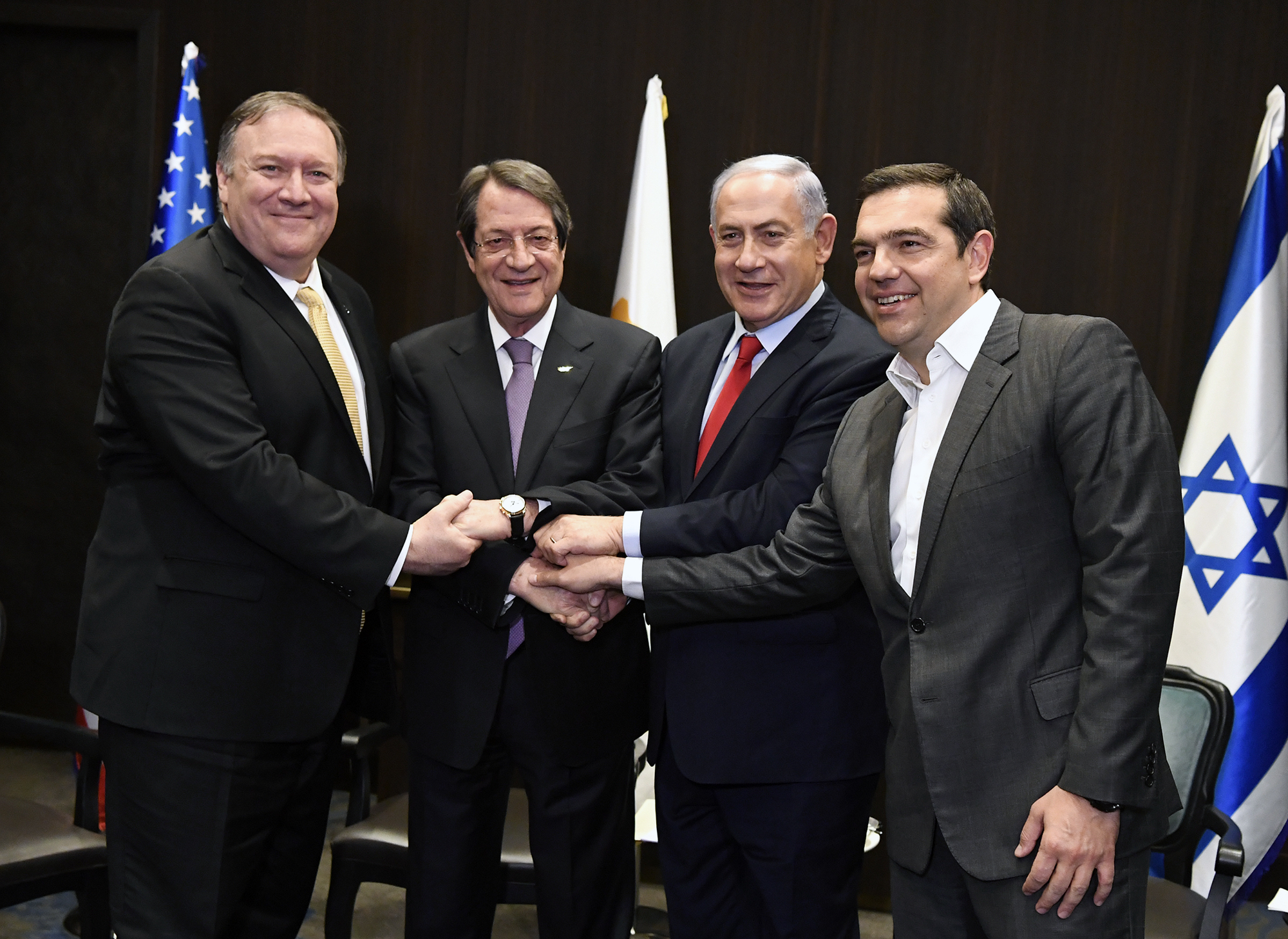
U.S Secretary of State Michael Pompeo historic visit at the Eastern Mediterranean Leaders’ Summit in Jerusalem, on March 20, 2019.

The first Cyprus-Israel-Greece tripartite meeting took place on 28 January 2016, in Nicosia. During the meeting, a joint declaration was adopted, establishing the foundation for cooperation in various fields. The United States, represented by former Secretary of State Mike Pompeo, participated in one of the subsequent trilateral summits.

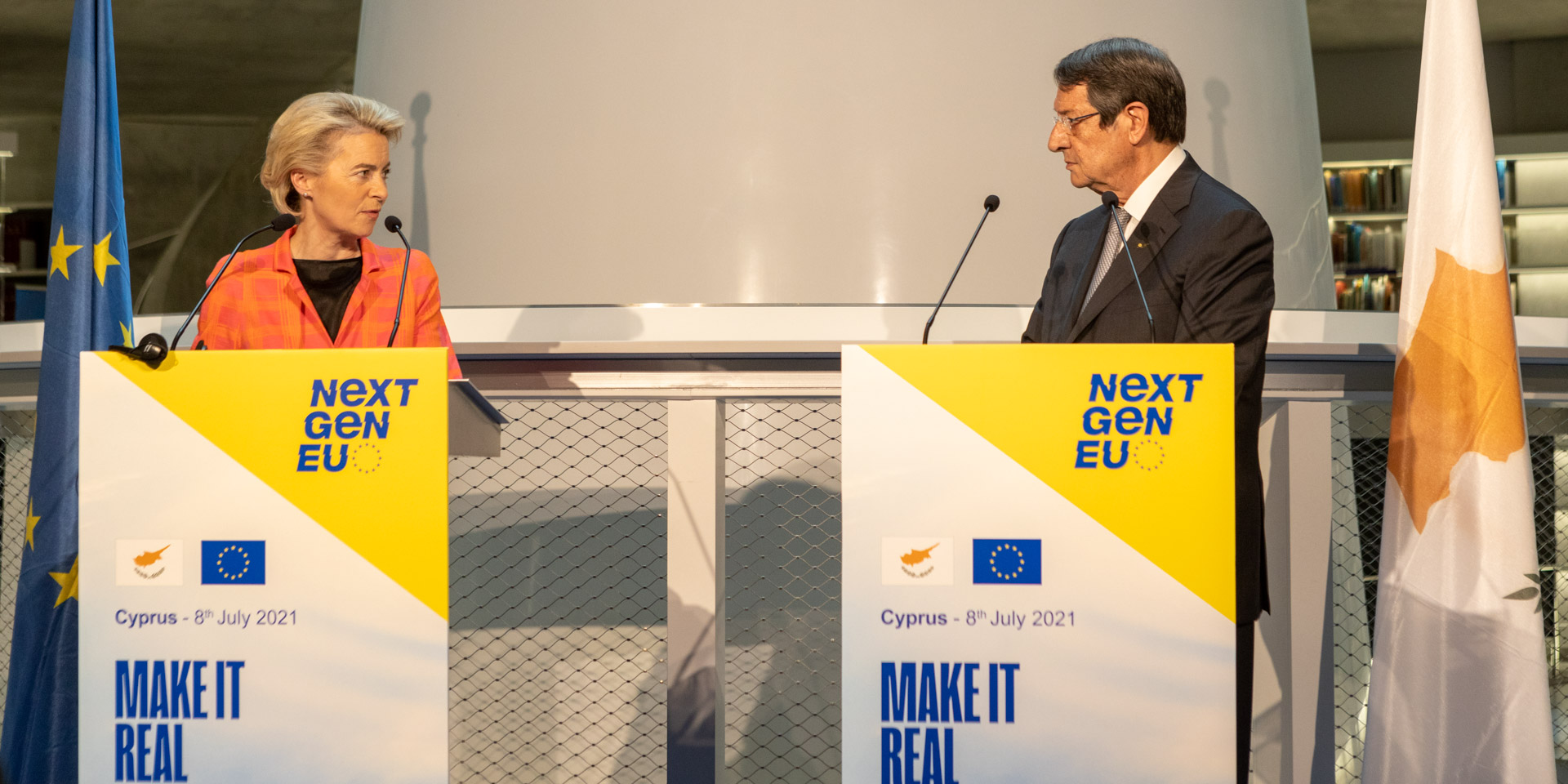
President of the European Commission Ursula von der Leyen at the University of Cyprus on 8 July 2021, announces approval and funding of €100 million for EuroAsia Interconnector out of the Cyprus RRP programme.

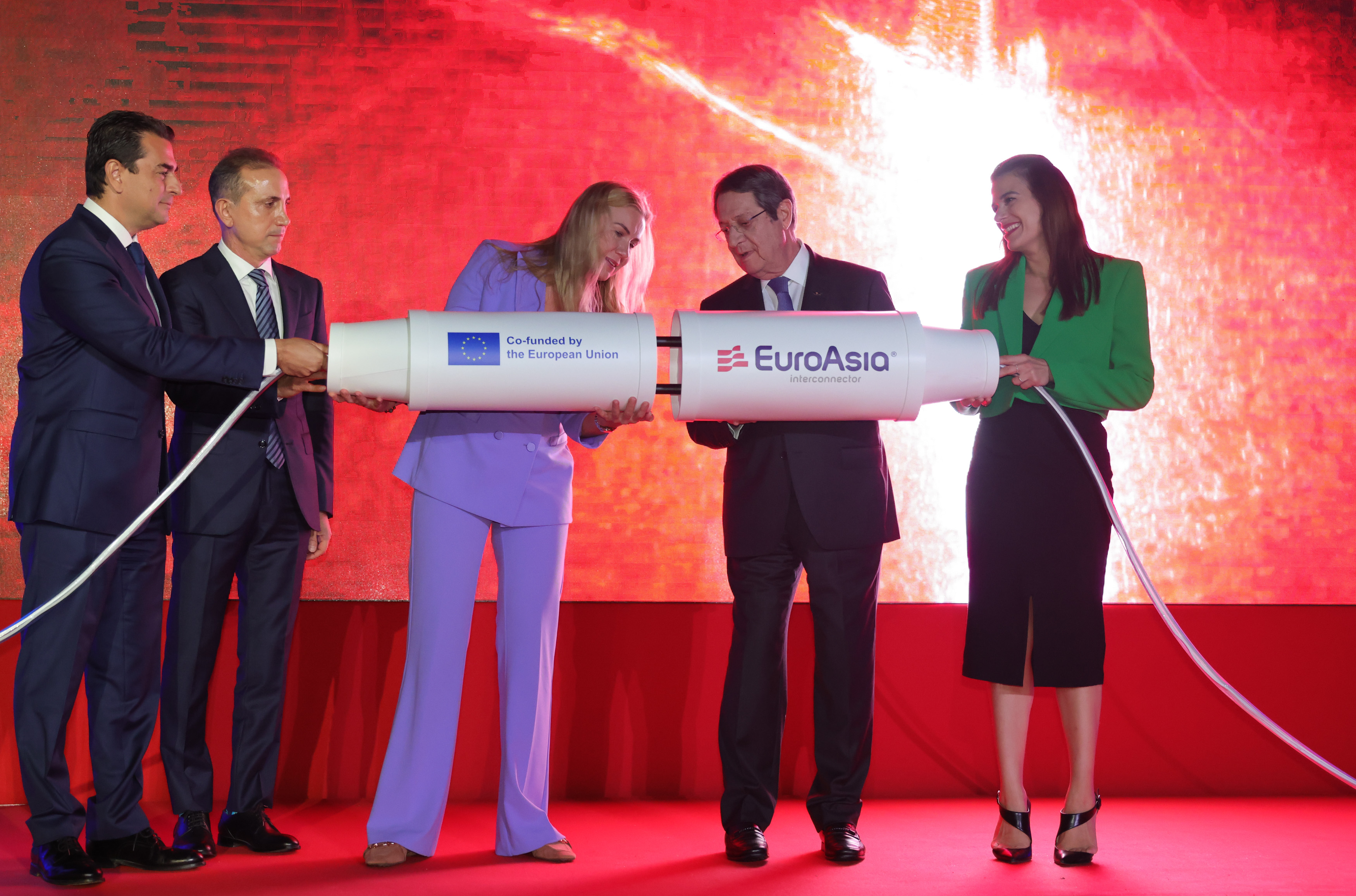
The inauguration ceremony of Interconnector held on 14 October 2022, was attended by EU Commissioner for Energy Kadri Simson, President of Cyprus Nicos Anastasiades, Greek and Cypriot Energy Ministers Kostas Skrekas and Natasa Pilides and CEO EuroAsia Interconnector Nasos Ktorides

On 2 January 2020, Anastasiades’ government signed a deal with Greece and Israel to construct a 1,900 km subsea pipeline, known as the EastMed project, to transport natural gas from the Eastern Mediterranean to Europe. The $6 to $7 billion pipeline was expected to initially carry 10 billion cubic meters of gas per year from Israeli and Cypriot waters to Greece, then through Italy into Europe's gas network. The pipeline project, owned by IGI Poseidon, involved Greek gas firm DEPA and Italian energy group Edison. However, the project has effectively been abandoned after the U.S. withdrew its support in January 2022, citing environmental concerns, economic viability issues and regional tensions. Also, the pipeline was criticised for excluding Turkey, a crucial route for a Mediterranean pipeline, and faced challenges amid the EU's climate goals.

On 8 March 2021, Cyprus, Israel and Greece signed an initial agreement for the EuroAsia Interconnector, the world's longest undersea power cable. The Memorandum of Understanding, signed in Nicosia, outlined plans to connect the electricity grids of Israel, Cyprus, and Crete in Greece through a 1,200-kilometer undersea cable, aiming for a 2,000-megawatt capacity. The project, considered a "major step forward" in integrating renewable energy sources, was expected to enhance energy security for Europe, particularly by ending Cyprus' isolation as the only non-interconnected EU member state. The European Commission recognised it as a "Project of Common Interest," and approved a €100 million funding under the "EU Recovery and Resilience Plan". The cable will allow Israel to receive electricity backing from the European continent during emergencies and boost reliance on solar power generation. On 26 January 2022, the European Commission granted approval for a further €657 million funding through the Connecting Europe Facility (CEF).

At a ceremony in Jerusalem, Anastasiades received the Presidential Medal of Honor from former Israeli President Isaac Herzog. The award recognised Anastasiades as an ally and true friend to Israel.

==== Tripartite regional cooperation between Cyprus, Greece and Jordan ====
In a trilateral summit held in Nicosia on 16 January 2018, King Abdullah II of Jordan, Nicos Anastasiades, and the then Greek Prime Minister Alexis Tsipras established a strategic tripartite regional partnership between Cyprus, Greece and Jordan. The leaders signed agreements across various sectors. A trilateral defence cooperation was signed, encompassing military exercises and the training of the Air Force, Navy, and Special Forces of the three countries.

==== Relations with Russia before invasion of Ukraine ====
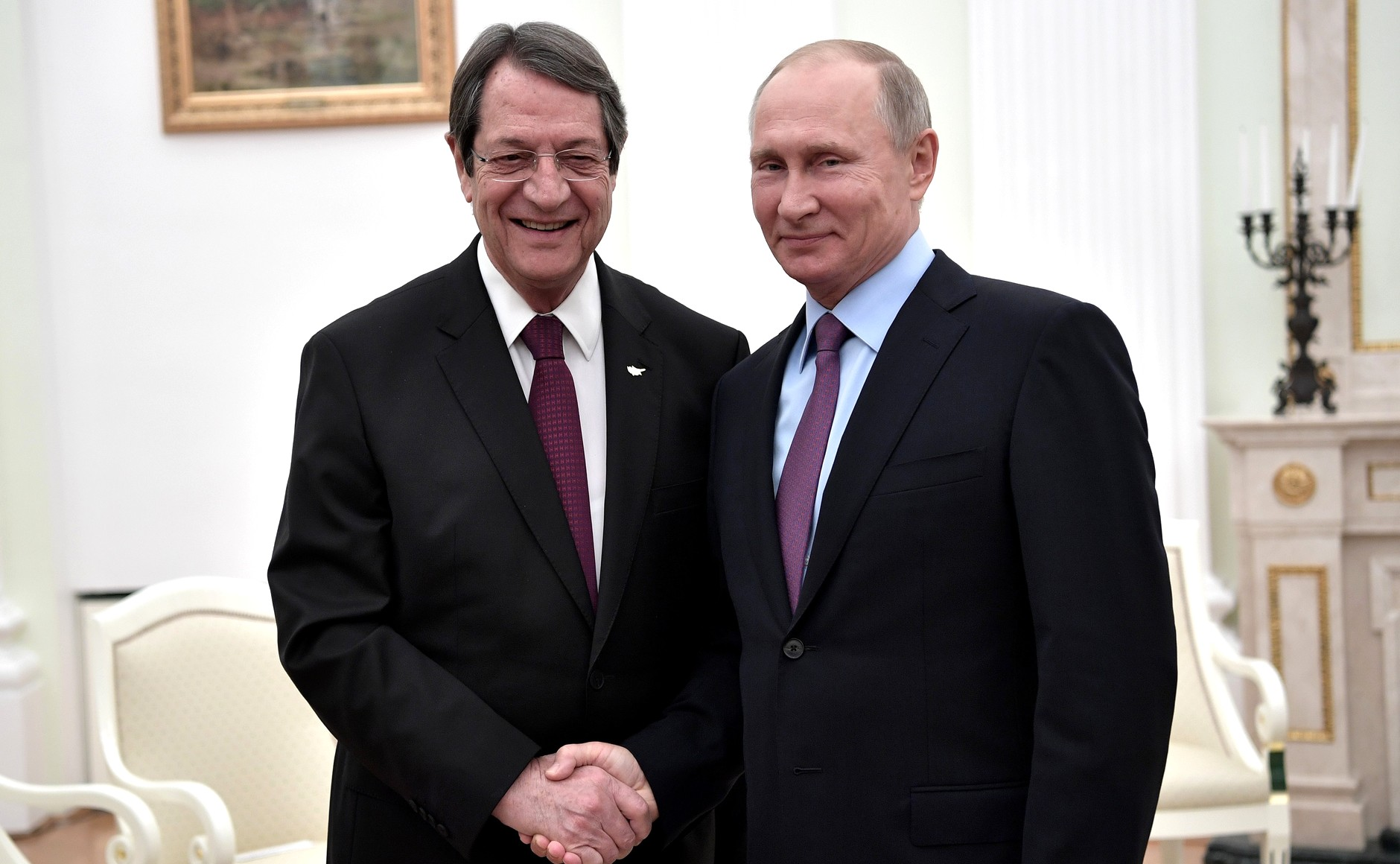
Nicos Anastasiades with Vladimir Putin, 2017

Before the Russian invasion of Ukraine, Anastasiades' government maintained close relations with the Russian Federation, a fact proudly acknowledged by both Anastasiades and Putin. During a key visit of Anastasiades to Moscow in February 2015, Putin highlighted that Russian investment in Cyprus comprised 80% of the total for the island, amounting to $33 billion, and that Cyprus had been visited by 600,000 Russians in 2014 alone. Putin expressed Russia's commitment to aiding Cyprus in recovering from the debt crisis, emphasising the importance of their economic ties. Anastasiades and Putin discussed enhancing military cooperation between Moscow and Brussels, despite EU sanctions. This included allowing Russian military ships and planes to use Cypriot ports and airstrips in emergency situations. Anastasiades also accepted an invitation to attend the 70th anniversary of Victory Day in World War II in Moscow on 9 May 2015.

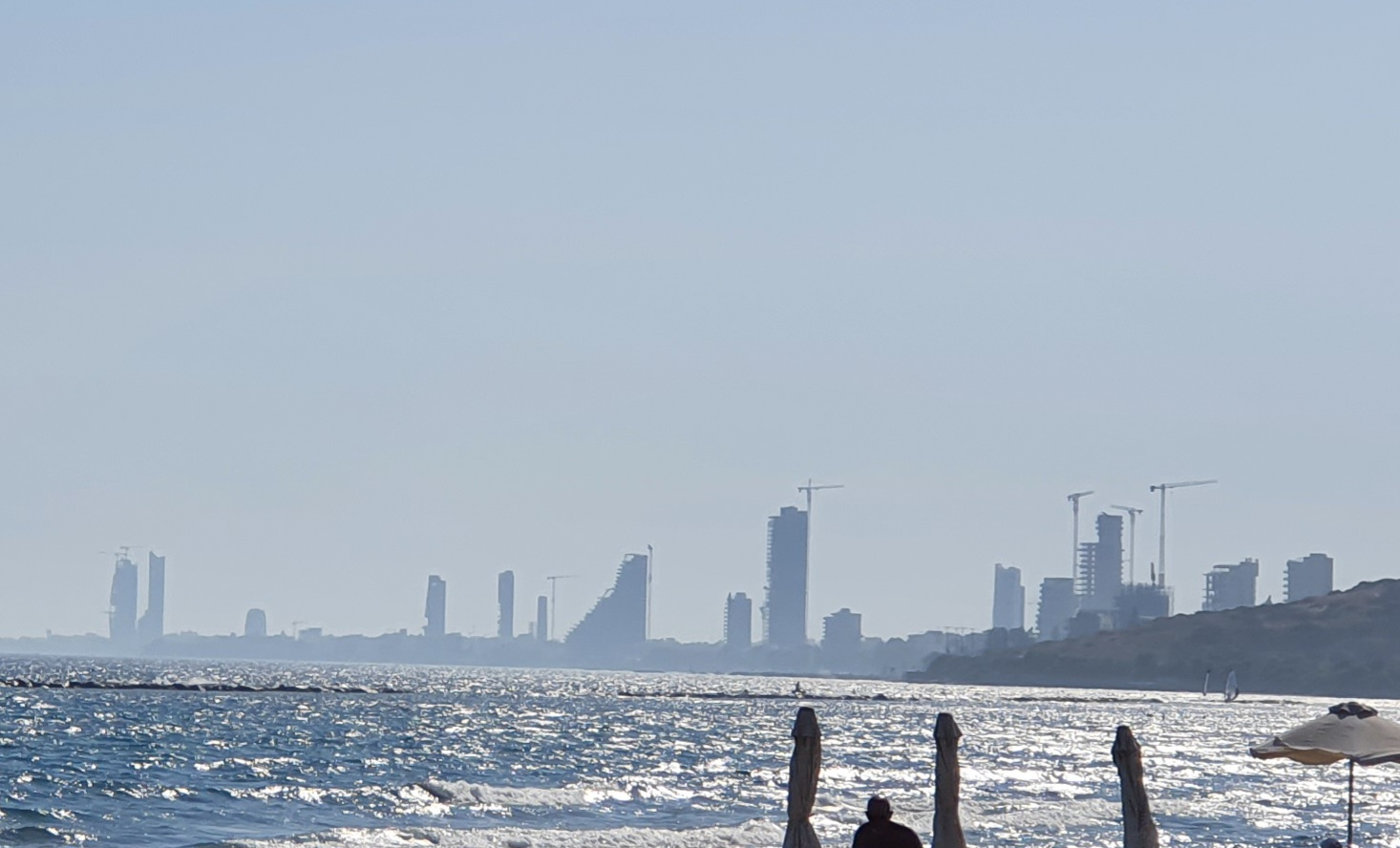
Skyline of Limassol undergoing a property development boom.

The close ties of Russia and Cyprus were highlighted frequently by both leaders. In a meeting during the Belt and Road Forum in Beijing, Putin noted a 154% increase in commerce with Cyprus, while Anastasiades expressed gratitude for Russia's longstanding political, economic, and military support. Anastasiades believed that Russia's intervention could play a crucial role in resolving the long-standing Cyprus issue, especially considering the positive relations between Russia and Turkey.

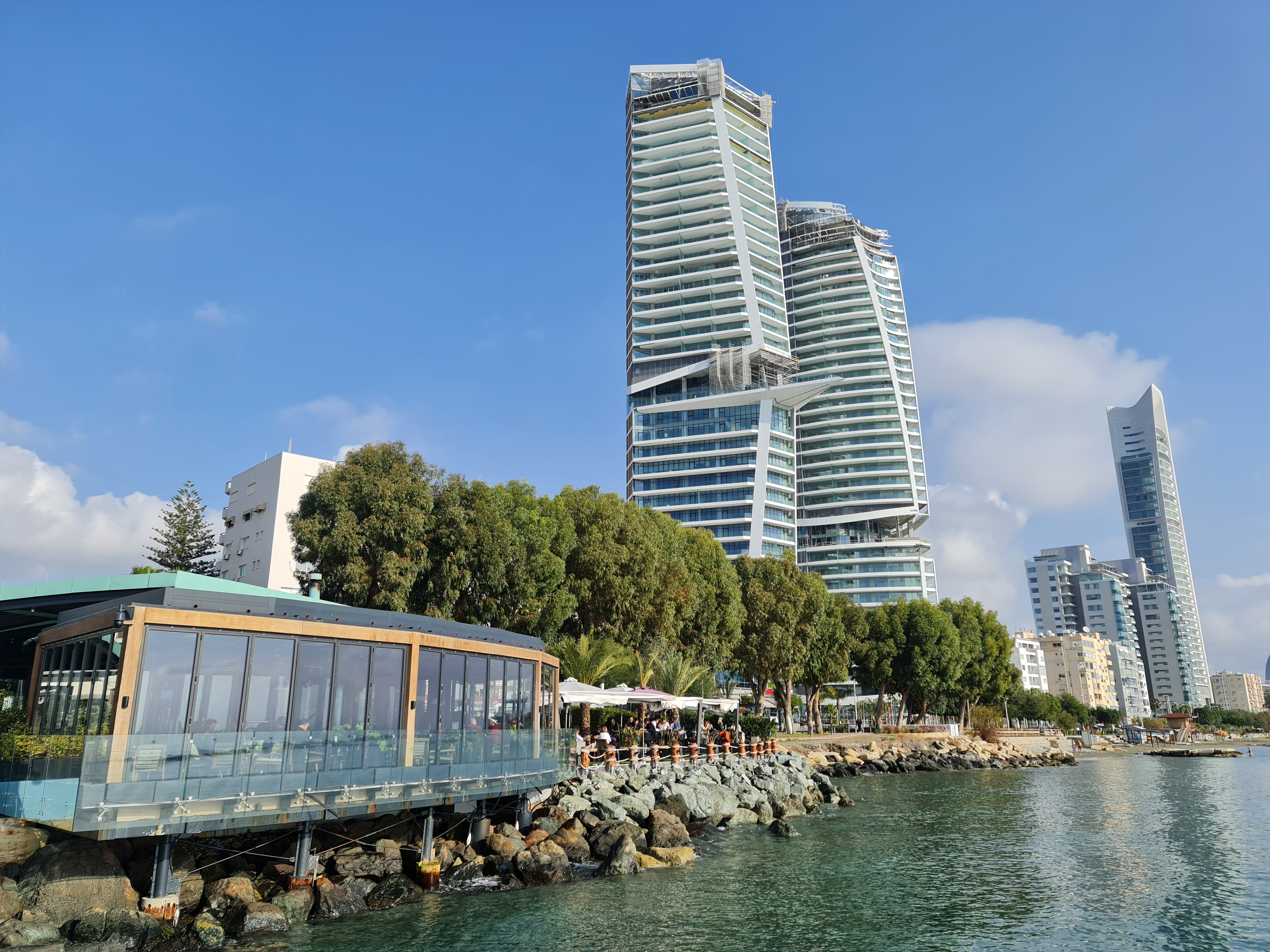
New high-rise buildings in Limassol

After the Cypriot financial crisis, Limassol underwent an unparalleled property development boom, driven largely by Russian investors drawn to Anastasiades’ money-for-passports program; this surge reshaped Limassol's skyline, turning it into a focal point for Russian expatriates and investors, offering the city the moniker "Limassolgrad." The city attracted a burgeoning Russian expatriate community engaged in offshore finance and wealth concealment, resulting in a Russian population of 50,000, evident in the proliferation of Cyrillic signage, Russian media outlets, schools, and churches throughout Limassol.

==== Relations with Russia after invasion of Ukraine ====
After Russia's invasion of Ukraine, Anastasiades' government underwent a significant shift in its stance toward Putin's regime. Anastasiades condemned Russia's invasion of Ukraine, expressing disappointment and emphasising Cyprus's opposition to actions violating the sovereignty and territorial integrity of an independent country. While acknowledging Russia's historical support for the Cyprus problem, he highlighted recent actions as a breach of international law, clarifying that the objection was to the government's specific actions, not the Russian people. Anastasiades reaffirmed Cyprus's solidarity with Ukraine, drawing parallels with Cyprus's own history of invasion and occupation by Turkey. Moreover, the government called for the withdrawal of Russian troops from Ukraine and supported targeted EU sanctions on Russia, cautioning, however, against disproportionate impacts on EU member states compared to Russia.

Russian Foreign Minister Sergey Lavrov described Russia's "traditional friends Greece and Cyprus" as "hasty" in their stance toward his country. In response, Anastasiades stated that Russia's violation of international law forced Cyprus to align with the European Union's collective decisions against Moscow, leaving his government with no choice but to participate in EU sanctions.

The economy of Limassol was significantly threatened with the deportation of Russian investors as their bank accounts were frozen. Sanctions prompted a business exodus, with many Cypriot companies working with Russians shutting down. The tourism sector, heavily reliant on Russian visitors, was threatened, and Limassol implemented a "de-Russianisation doctrine," with a shifting in mindset, emphasising service-oriented industries over large-scale manufacturing. Despite the challenges, the economy of Limassol demonstrated resilience, with negligible changes in transaction volumes and tourism numbers in 2023.

The U.S.A directed Anastasiades’ administration to address the issue of Russian individuals and their questionable deposits, and, in return, the U.S. lifted the arms sales embargo to Cyprus; as a result, American marines and warships participated in joint exercises with the Cypriot National Guard in the port of Limassol.

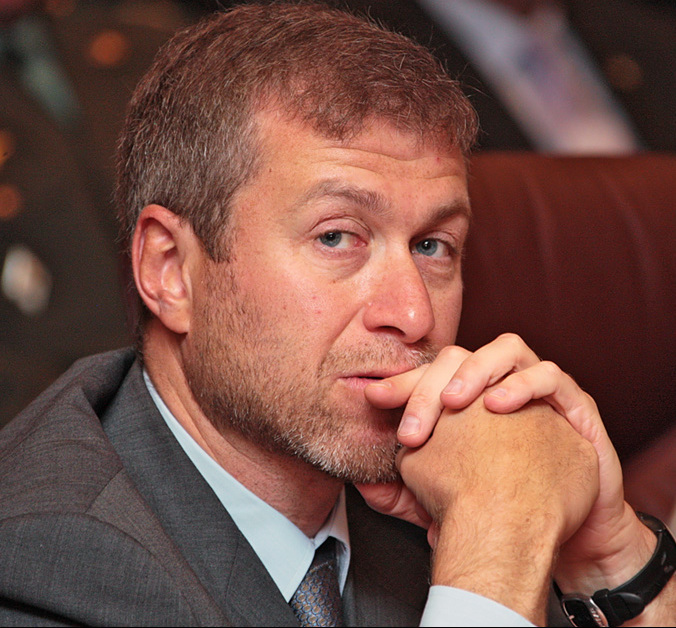
Roman Abramovich, a key Russian billionaire featured in the ICIJ investigation into Anastasiades' secret relations with Putin's regime.

Despite ostensible attempts by Anastasiades' government to disassociate from Putin's regime, the "Cyprus Confidential" investigation exposed undisclosed and contentious Cyprus-Russian relations that endured post the 2022 Russian invasion of Ukraine. Leaked documents unveiled Anastasiades' connections to Russian oligarchs and meetings with Putin, prompting concerns about his potential participation in controversial financial activities, such as facilitating fund transfers and share evasion for Russian oligarchs, thereby bypassing international sanctions.

The International Consortium of Investigative Journalists (ICIJ) uncovered that PwC Cyprus facilitated the transfer of $1.4 billion for Russian tycoon Alexei Mordashov to evade EU sanctions, triggering a Cypriot criminal investigation; the ICIJ further accused PwC of assisting two other Russian oligarchs in moving $100 million. The leaked 3.6 million documents implicate six billionaires, including Roman Abramovich, while former President Nikos Anastasiades is depicted as supporting Russian interests amid international sanctions, prompting inquiries into alleged money laundering activities.

==== Relations with Saudi Arabia ====
On 3 January 2018, Anastasiades undertook the first official visit of a Cypriot President to Saudi Arabia, following an invitation from Saudi King Salman bin Abdulaziz Al Saud. Both leaders emphasised the need to enhance EU relations with Gulf countries as well as the need to fight religious extremism. Many bilateral agreements were signed, including an agreement on avoiding double taxation and preventing tax evasion on income, an executive program in the field of civil aviation, and a memorandum of understanding on political consultations between the Foreign Ministries. Secretary-General of the Gulf Cooperation Council, Abdul Latif Bin Rashid Al Zayani, acknowledged the deepening ties between Saudi Arabia and Cyprus under Anastasiades' leadership.

Anastasiades and Saudi Arabia's Crown Prince Mohammed bin Salman affirmed their mutual commitment to enhancing bilateral ties, during a meeting in Riyadh, on 1 March 2022. They discussed strengthening cooperation in tourism and connectivity, along with investment opportunities. The talks covered global issues such as the Russian invasion of Ukraine, the Cyprus problem, and matters in the Eastern Mediterranean. Energy-related topics, including the Eurasia Interconnector project, were also on the agenda. Both leaders expressed a strong desire to elevate their relations to a strategic level, and the Crown Prince accepted an invitation to visit Cyprus.

=== COVID-19 pandemic ===
On 9 March 2020, Cyprus reported its first two cases of COVID-19, sparking panic among the population. The number of cases continued to rise steadily, prompting the Anastasiades’ government to implement strict, unprecedented social restriction measures. This move aligned with a global effort to curb the spread of the disease within the community.

==== Lockdowns ====
In response to the escalating COVID-19 crisis, Anastasiades’ government implemented the first full-scale lockdown from 24 March to 13 April 2020. The lockdown aimed to restrict citizen movement and curb the virus spread. To facilitate permitted movements, the Ministry of Health introduced two forms: Form A, a Work Commute Certification to be signed by employers or self-employed individuals, and Form B, an Exceptional Movement Declaration for citizens moving for specific justified reasons. Alternatively, citizens could gain movement approval by sending an SMS to 8998.

Starting 30 November 2020, Anastasiades' government implemented a new partial lockdown with an island-wide curfew at night. New business regulations affected restaurant hours, closed gyms and pools for two weeks, and imposed customer limits in malls. Household gatherings were limited to 10 people, and public gatherings, including protests, were prohibited. The measures were meant to be lifted on 14 December. However, the partial lockdown failed to limit the number of new daily cases, prompting the government to intensify restrictions from 11 to 31 December. This included the closure of hospitality venues, shopping malls, and the implementation of a ban on Christmas church attendance.

Anastasiades’ government implemented a second full-scale lockdown on 10 January 2021, after the failure of the previous measures to combat the surge in COVID-19 infections. Then health Minister Constantinos Ioannou announced the closure of retail businesses, including hairdressers and large department stores, until 31 January. The lockdown permitted individuals to leave their homes only twice a day for essential activities, maintaining the existing daily curfew from 21:00 to 05:00. Distance learning was reinstated in schools, while kindergartens remained open. The decision came amid a significant spike in infections, with daily cases consistently surpassing 300.

Anastasiades' government implemented a new two-week partial lockdown from 26 April to 9 May 2021, coinciding with the Orthodox Easter holidays, as the country grappled with a third wave of COVID-19 cases, primarily fuelled by a new, more contagious British variant. The new measures included encouraging remote work, closing non-essential shops, and imposing a stricter curfew from 9:00 pm to 5:00 am. Restrictions were slightly eased for Orthodox Easter. After 9 May, gatherings required either a negative COVID-19 rapid test, proof of vaccination, or recent recovery from the virus.

==== SafePass implementation ====
On 10 May 2021, the so-called SafePass was implemented by Anastasiades’ government. Citizens in Cyprus, when visiting crowded places, were required to present evidence of COVID-19 immunity (vaccination certificate with at least one dose or proof of COVID-19 contraction in the last 6 months), or a negative rapid test result valid for 72 hours. The responsibility for checking evidence lay with Police Officers or competent Ministries/Departments, not the managers of the businesses.

On 15 May 2022, the mandatory SafePass display was abolished, marked by a significant reduction in both the number of cases and hospitalisations.

==== Travel restrictions ====
On 13 March 2020, Nikos Anastasiades addressed the nation, revealing his move to combat the escalating COVID-19 pandemic. He announced a 15-day border closure, effective from 15 March 2020, as part of precautionary measures against the spread of the coronavirus. The closure applied to all individuals except Cypriots, Europeans working on the island, and those with special permits.

Cyprus initiated a phased reopening of its borders on 9 June 2020, allowing entry from specific countries. The reopening happened in two phases, with countries categorised as A or B based on international epidemiological data. Anastasiades’ government introduced a policy offering reimbursement of travel costs for visitors testing positive for COVID-19 after their arrival. However, despite the efforts to revive the tourism sector, the pandemic-induced restrictions resulted in an 85% plunge in tourist arrivals in Cyprus in 2020, reflecting the nation's worst tourism season.

On 14 February 2021, Greece, Cyprus, and Israel agreed to allow free travel between them for citizens with COVID-19 vaccination certificates, in a move seen as a trial run for other nations. The agreements were hailed as a potential step toward normalising tourism amid the pandemic. Cyprus's then deputy tourism minister emphasised the significance of the deal for the country's economy. The arrangement came into effect on 1 April 2021.

On 1 June 2022, the government of Anastasiades lifted all Covid-related measures and travel restrictions at the Republic's ports and airports. Mask requirements in indoor spaces were eliminated, and travelers arriving in Cyprus were no longer obligated to present a vaccination certificate, recovery proof, or negative PCR or rapid test. Then transport Minister Yiannis Karousos emphasised that this move signified a return to normality in travel, with flight capacity reaching high levels and passenger traffic approaching pre-pandemic figures.

==== Testing and vaccination campaign ====
On 8 November 2020, a free rapid testing program for everyone was launched by Anastasiades’ government, to assess the virus's prevalence in the community. One month later, on 27 December 2020, Cyprus commenced its COVID-19 vaccination campaign, prioritising the elderly. Nicos Anastassiades requested a supplementary amount of vaccines from Israel.

On 28 January 2021, a mandatory weekly rapid test requirement for employees was introduced.

In April 2021, Cyprus ranked first in the EU in terms of COVID-19 testing, conducting 40,958 tests per 100,000 population. The country also had the second lowest positivity rate at 0.8% and one of the EU's lowest mortality rates (20.3/100,000).

On 1 August 2021, the Anastasiades government concluded the provision of free rapid tests for unvaccinated individuals, with some exceptions. These exceptions included minors up to 17 years old, adults 18 years and above unable to be vaccinated, and pregnant women exempt from vaccination based on medical certification. The termination of free rapid tests coincided with the implementation of a maximum charge of 10 euros for antigen tests, as per Decree No. 32 30 July 2021. Citizens not falling within these specified categories could choose to undergo private antigen tests at their own expense to obtain a SafePass.

==== Addressing prison overcrowding ====
On 27 March 2020, amid concerns about overcrowding in Nicosia prison that could lead to an increased viral spread, Anastasiades announced the release of 50 prisoners. The prison, designed for 540 spaces, was accommodating 820 inmates. The measure aimed to mitigate the risk of virus transmission within the facility, and only non-violent prisoners were eligible for release. Following this, on 31 March 2020, the Cypriot cabinet approved additional measures to address overcrowding, including early releases, transfers to the open prison, and electronic home monitoring. In total, 114 prisoners were released as part of these measures.

==== Stranded cruise ships ====
During the economic challenges of the COVID-19 pandemic, the government of Anastasiades opened Cypriot waters to six cruise liners, such as Carnival's luxury "Enchanted Princess," for refuelling and anchorage over several months. While the ships were immobilised near Cyprus’ coasts, Cyprus experienced economic benefits, earning €120,000 monthly in fees for hosting these vessels. This provided a slight alleviation of the economic turmoil caused by the absence of tourism.

==== Protests ====
On 7 March 2020, dozens of demonstrators attempted to breach a police cordon at Nicosia's Ledra Street crossing, with around 200 Greek Cypriots and 150 Turkish Cypriots demanding its reopening. Authorities closed four of the nine checkpoints on the divided island for public health reasons amid COVID-19 outbreaks, marking the first closures since tensions eased in 2003. Then Greek Cypriot Health Minister Constantinos Ioannou insisted the closures were not political, citing a shortage of medical personnel monitoring the crossings, while the UN expressed concern and called for coordinated efforts to address the situation. The government of Anastasiades planned to re-evaluate the closures.

On 13 February 2021, clashes erupted between police and protesters in Nicosia, as demonstrators voiced their anger to government corruption and COVID-19 restrictions. The unusual confrontations saw the use of tear gas and water cannons, resulting in a minimum of eight arrests. The protest was attended by left-wing activists and trade unions.

On 18 July 2021, protesters opposing COVID-19 measures and vaccines attacked Sigma TV, a Cypriot television station in Nicosia, following a larger protest against the "Safepass" and mandatory vaccination outside the presidential palace. Around 2,500 demonstrators targeted the station, throwing fireworks and damaging cars, resulting in a car being set on fire and damage to the building. Sigma TV, known for its firm stance against anti-vaccination movements, reported the incident as a "cowardly attack." President Nicos Anastasiades condemned the violence, underscoring that the state would not succumb to irrational conspiracy theories. Five arrests took place in connection with the attack, while another 10 suspects filmed by CCTV cameras were being sought. The country had been facing a fourth wave of COVID-19 infections, prompting an expanded vaccination rollout. Sigma TV had been previously targeted in protests against anti-coronavirus measures.

In November and December 2021, various protests took place, sparked by stricter Covid measures in schools, including mandatory facemasks and SafePass requirements for children as young as six. In Limassol parents clashed with police, blocking traffic for two days. A 36-year-old man was arrested for assaulting an officer.

==== Aftermath ====
Despite unprecedented protests and heavy criticism, Anastasiades' COVID-19 campaign has emerged as a success story, securing the fifth position in the global COVID Performance Index of 98 nations by the Sydney-based Lowy Institute. Cyprus holds the highest ranking among European countries, being surpassed only by New Zealand, Vietnam, Taiwan, and Thailand. The ranking is determined by various criteria, including confirmed cases, deaths, and testing metrics. Cyprus showcased effectiveness in containing the virus, with its smaller population, cohesive society, and capable institutions highlighted as comparative advantages. The country's proactive response, incorporating early lockdown measures and a comprehensive testing strategy, significantly contributed to its success.

During the global challenges posed by the COVID-19 pandemic, Cyprus did not only stand out for its effective response in minimising cases and deaths, but also showcased remarkable resilience in its business sector. The Aspen Trust Group highlights the key factors that contributed to Cyprus's success, emphasising the amalgamation of stability and adaptability within business, governmental regulations, and lifestyle influences. The report underscores the proactive measures taken, including government support schemes, border measures, and a robust testing and vaccination strategy. Despite challenges, Cyprus businesses demonstrated strength, buoyed by governmental support, effective regulations, continued foreign investments, and opportunities in advantageous real estate. The nation's success in maintaining growth indicators and its ability to navigate the crisis through diversification and modernization of the marketplace further solidify Cyprus's standing as a resilient business hub amidst the pandemic.

In 2022, Cyprus navigated a challenging economic landscape marked by the effects of the COVID-19 pandemic. Despite these adversities, the Cypriot economy demonstrated resilience, achieving 5.6% GDP growth in 2022, surpassing initial estimates of 2.7%. The growth was driven by the recovery of the tourism sector, increased connectivity, and supportive measures. However, inflation surged to 8.1%, impacting purchasing power, particularly for vulnerable groups. Noteworthy achievements included a reduction in public debt to 86.5% of GDP, and a decline in unemployment to 6.8%. The government's 2023 budget had a surplus of 2.1% of GDP, focusing on development, social spending, and reduced debt service costs. The National Resilience and Recovery Plan, absorbing funds up to €4.4 billion, catalysed economic growth and reforms. Additionally, 2022, despite the effects of the pandemic, witnessed historic milestones, such as the adoption of the national minimum wage and the approval of a pension plan for certain public sector workers.

=== Controversies ===
On 3 November 2019, newspapers reported that under Anastasiades' government, controversial Malaysian figure Jho Low had been granted Cypriot citizenship. It was reported that Jho Low obtained the passport under the Cypriot citizenship investment scheme just two days after investing in Cypriot property. There was no warrant against Jho Low for the 1MDB scandal; however, he was already under investigation and investigators were closing in on him for his alleged money laundering activities. He was granted the passport despite the fact that a background check on him raised several red flags because of his status as a politically exposed person, as well as his alleged fraud and regulatory breaches. It was also revealed that while the golden passport scheme normally requires applicants to live in the country for at least seven years, as well as buy property, the decision to override this requirement was taken by the country's cabinet. However, the such exemptions are frequently granted. The revelation concerning Jho Low's Cypriot citizenship came after the Cypriot citizenship investment scheme, implemented by Anastasiades's cabinet to increase foreign investment, came under scrutiny. This was due to the decision to grant citizenship to Cambodian elites.

Prior to becoming president, Anastasiades founded a law firm that provided offshore practices and aided in particular Russian clients. Once he became president, Anastasiades entered into agreements with Russia, led by President Putin, to promote closer economic and financial ties between Russia and Cyprus. During this time, Cyprus became an important vehicle for Russian oligarchs to register their assets and avoid international sanctions.

More specifically, in August 2019, an OCCRP report linked President Anastasiades' Law firm, which he co-owned and from which he stepped away just as he was ascending to the presidency in 2013, with "business deals linked to a friend of Russian President Vladimir Putin, the infamous Magnitsky scandal, and a network of companies used in various financial crimes." Both of President Anastasiades' daughters are still partners in the firm, and he still has a private office in the building. The report revealed that Anastasiades' Law firm "executed complex deals that moved Russian money to and from shell companies created by and associated with the firm", two of which appear to be deeply entwined with the Troika Laundromat.

In 2021, his name was mentioned in the Pandora papers.

Makarios Drousiotis, a political activist, journalist, and writer, published a trilogy of books containing personal accounts and third-party documents uncovering extensive corruption scandals during the presidency of Nicos Anastasiades. In 2024, his third publication, "Mafia State," instigated a criminal investigation against Anastasiades, prompting the involvement of international legal practitioner Gabrielle Louise McIntyre.

On 23 April 2024, Anastasiades filed a lawsuit against Drousiotis, seeking over €2,000,000 in defamation damages and a ban on his books "Mafia State" and "The Gang", alleging malicious falsehoods.

In 2026, OCCRP, Belarusian Investigative Center, ZDF, Der Standard, Paper Trail Media, and Cyber Partisans published an investigation into the business ties of Nicos Anastasiades' family with Belarusian businessman Yury Chyzh.

== Personal and family life ==
Anastasiades married Andri Moustakoudes in 1971 and they have two daughters, Elsa and Ino. His daughters are listed as owners of a law firm that Anastasiades founded.

He has a twin brother and a sister. In 2001, his twin brother, Pambos Anastasiades, was sentenced to 18 months in prison for his role in a work permit scandal, which was related to forging "pink visas", i.e. work permits for foreign women employed in illegal brothels.

== Distinctions ==
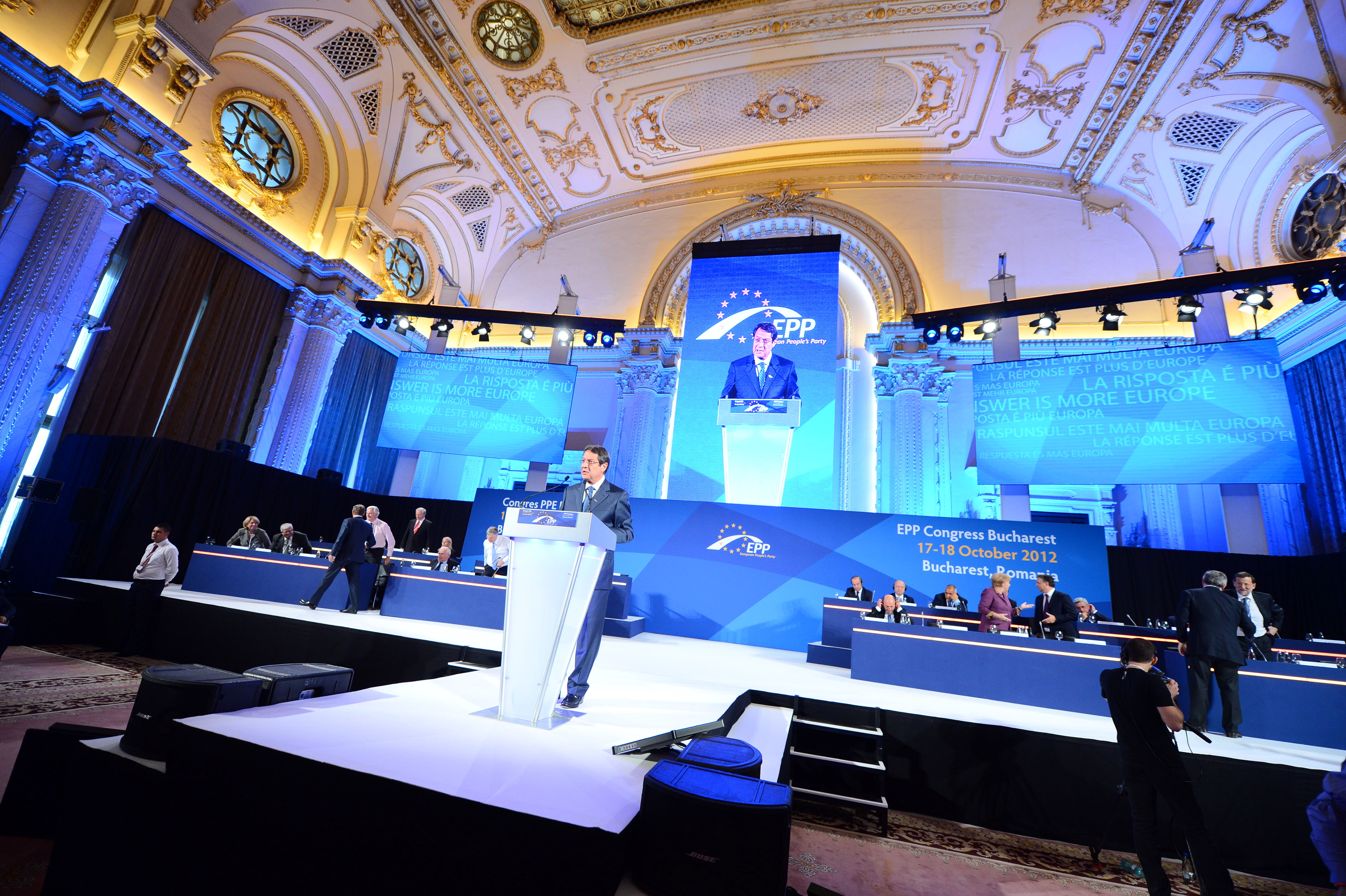
Anastasiades speaking in Bucharest in October 2012

- First Vice-president of the delegation of the House to the EU-Cyprus Joint Parliamentary Committee (JPC).
- Leader of the delegation of the House to the Association of Asian Parliaments for Peace (Asian Parliamentary Assembly (APA) since 2008).
- Leader of the delegation of the House to the Parliamentary Assembly of the Mediterranean (PAM).
- Leader of the delegation of the House to the Euro-Mediterranean Parliamentary Assembly (EMPA) (Parliamentary Assembly of the Union for the Mediterranean since 2010).
- Leader of the delegation of the House to the Euro-Mediterranean Parliamentary Assembly (EMPA) (Parliamentary Assembly of the Union for the Mediterranean since 2010).
- Vice-president of the executive committee of the Cyprus Group to the Inter-Parliamentary Union (IPU).
- Member of the delegation of the House to the Parliamentary Assembly of the Union for the Mediterranean and of the delegation of the House to the Asian Parliamentary Assembly (APA).

== Honours and awards ==
- Greek Orthodox Patriarchate of Jerusalem: Knight Grand Cross of the Order of the Orthodox Crusaders of the Holy Sepulchre (7 May 2013)
- Panama: Collar of the Order of Manuel Amador Guerrero (23 July 2013)
- Bahrain: Order of Sheikh Isa bin Salman Al Khalifa (9 March 2015)
- Greece: Grand Collar of the Order of the Redeemer (30 March 2015)
- Egypt: Grand Collar of the Order of the Nile (20 November 2017)
- Greek Orthodox Patriarchate of Alexandria: Knight Grand Cross of the Order of Saint Mark (1 May 2018)
- Serbia: Grand Cross of the Order of the Republic of Serbia (10 May 2018)
- Serbian Orthodox Church: Order of St. Sava (10 May 2018)
- Slovenia: Order for Exceptional Merits (9 January 2019)
- Poland: Grand Cross of the Order of the White Eagle (4 October 2021)
- Georgia: Order of the Golden Fleece (9 November 2021)
- Jordan: Grand Cordon of the Supreme Order of the Renaissance (17 December 2021)
- Holy See: Grand Collar of the Order of Pope Pius IX (25 October 2022)
- Israel: Israeli Presidential Medal of Honour (10 November 2022)

== See also ==
- European People's Party
- Reduction of military conscription in Cyprus

Party political offices
Preceded by Yiannakis Matsis	Leader of the Democratic Rally; 1997–2013	Succeeded by Averof Neofytou
Political offices
Preceded by Demetris Christofias	President of Cyprus; 2013–2023	Succeeded by Nikos Christodoulides
