= April 14 =

April 14 this year in various calendars
- Tuesday, 14 April 2026
Akan	Kurubene
Armenian	28 Ahekani 1475
Aztec	Tlaxochimaco 14, 4 Ehēcatl
Babylonian	25 Adaru, 2336 SE
Balinese pawukon	Menga, Pasah, Laba, Umanis, Paniron, Anggara of Landep, Indra, Urungan, Dewa
Bengali	1 Boisakh, BS 1433
Chinese	Yang Earth Horse・Encampment Mansion; Fire Horse Year, Month 2, Day 27 (Qingming, 6 days until Guyu)
Common Era	14 April 2026 CE
Coptic	6 Parmouti, AM 1742
Egyptian	3 Epagomenae, 2774 NE
Ethiopian	6 Miyāzyā, 2018 Amätä Məhrät
French Republican	Décade III, Quintidi de Germinal de l'Année 234 de la République
Gregorian	14 April, AD 2026
Hebrew	27 Nisan, AM 5786; Omer 12
Hindu	Śatabhiṣaj・Śukla; Solar: 1 Vaiśākha, 1948 SE; Lunisolar: Dvādaśī, Kṛishna pakṣa of Caitra, 2083 VE; Rāudra・5127 KY・1,872,679
Icelandic	Þriðjudagur, 22 Einmánuður 2025
Islamic	26 Shawwal, AH 1447 (using tabular method)
ISO week date	2026-W16-2
Japanese	27 Kisaragi, Reiwa 8 (Seimei, 6 days until Kokuu)
Julian	1 April, AD 2026 (AM 7534)
Julian day	2461145
Korean	27 Tokkidal, 4359 DE
Maya	13.0.13.9.2; 15 Pop, 4 Ik
Roman	Kalendis Aprilibus, MMDCCLXXIX AUC
Solar Hijri	25 Farvardin, SH 1405
Tibetan	27 dbo, me pho rta 2153 or 1772 or 1000

<<	April					>>
Su	Mo	Tu	We	Th	Fr	Sa
			1	2	3	4
5	6	7	8	9	10	11
12	13	14	15	16	17	18
19	20	21	22	23	24	25
26	27	28	29	30
2026

April 14 in recent years
2026 (Tuesday)
2025 (Monday)
2024 (Sunday)
2023 (Friday)
2022 (Thursday)
2021 (Wednesday)
2020 (Tuesday)
2019 (Sunday)
2018 (Saturday)
2017 (Friday)

April 14 is the 104th day of the year (105th in leap years) in the Gregorian calendar; 261 days remain until the end of the year.

== Events ==
=== Pre-1600 ===
- 43 BC – Legions loyal to the Roman Senate, commanded by Gaius Pansa, defeat the forces of Mark Antony in the Battle of Forum Gallorum.
- 69 – Vitellius, commanding Rhine-based armies, defeats Roman emperor Otho in the First Battle of Bedriacum to take power over Rome.
- 966 – Following his marriage to the Christian Doubravka of Bohemia, the pagan ruler of the Polans, Mieszko I, converts to Christianity, an event considered to be the founding of the Polish state.
- 972 – Otto II, Co-Emperor of the Holy Roman Empire, marries Byzantine princess Theophanu. She is crowned empress by Pope John XIII in Rome the same day.
- 1205 – Combined Bulgarian and Cuman army under Kalojan ambushes and defeats forces of the Latin Empire of Constantinople in the Battle of Adrianople.
- 1395 – Tokhtamysh–Timur war: At the Battle of the Terek River, Timur defeats the army of the Golden Horde, beginning the khanate's permanent military decline.
- 1471 – In England, the Yorkists under Edward IV defeat the Lancastrians under the Earl of Warwick at the Battle of Barnet; the Earl is killed and Edward resumes the throne.
- 1561 – A celestial phenomenon is reported over Nuremberg, described as an aerial battle.

=== 1601–1900 ===
- 1639 – Thirty Years' War: Forces of the Holy Roman Empire and Electorate of Saxony are defeated by the Swedes at the Battle of Chemnitz, ending the military effectiveness of the Saxon army for the rest of the war and allowing the Swedes to advance into Bohemia.
- 1775 – The Society for the Relief of Free Negroes Unlawfully Held in Bondage, the first abolition society in North America, is organized in Philadelphia by Benjamin Franklin and Benjamin Rush.
- 1793 – The French troops led by Léger-Félicité Sonthonax defeat the slaves settlers in the Siege of Port-au-Prince.
- 1816 – Bussa, a slave in British-ruled Barbados, leads a slave rebellion, for which he is remembered as the country's first national hero.
- 1849 – Hungary declares itself independent of Austria with Lajos Kossuth as its leader.
- 1858 – The 1858 Christiania fire severely destroys several city blocks near Stortorvet in Christiania, Norway, and about 1,000 people lose their homes.
- 1865 – U.S. President Abraham Lincoln is shot in Ford's Theatre by John Wilkes Booth; Lincoln dies the following day.
- 1865 – William H. Seward, the U.S. Secretary of State, and his family are attacked at home by Lewis Powell.
- 1881 – The Four Dead in Five Seconds Gunfight occurs in El Paso, Texas.
- 1890 – The Pan-American Union is founded by the First International Conference of American States in Washington, D.C.
- 1894 – The first ever commercial motion picture house opens in New York City, United States. It uses ten Kinetoscopes, devices for peep-show viewing of films.
- 1895 – The 1895 Ljubljana earthquake, both the most and last destructive earthquake in the area, occurs.
- 1900 – The world's fair Exposition Universelle opens in Paris.

=== 1901–present ===
- 1906 – The first meeting of the Azusa Street Revival, which will launch Pentecostalism as a worldwide movement, is held in Los Angeles.
- 1908 – Hauser Dam, a steel dam on the Missouri River in Montana, fails, sending a surge of water 25 to 30 feet (7.6 to 9.1 m) high downstream.
- 1909 – Muslims in the Ottoman Empire begin a massacre of Armenians in Adana.
- 1912 – The British passenger liner RMS Titanic hits an iceberg in the North Atlantic and begins to sink.
- 1929 – The inaugural Monaco Grand Prix takes place in the Principality of Monaco. William Grover-Williams wins driving a Bugatti Type 35.
- 1931 – The Second Spanish Republic is proclaimed and King Alfonso XIII goes into exile. Meanwhile, in Barcelona, Francesc Macià proclaims the Catalan Republic.
- 1935 – The Black Sunday dust storm, considered one of the worst storms of the Dust Bowl, sweeps across the Oklahoma and Texas panhandles and neighboring areas.
- 1940 – World War II: Royal Marines land in Namsos, Norway, preceding a larger force which will arrive two days later.
- 1941 – World War II: German and Italian forces attack Tobruk, Libya.
- 1945 – World War II: In what becomes known as the Razing of Friesoythe, the 4th Canadian (Armoured) Division deliberately destroys the German town of Friesoythe on the orders of Major General Christopher Vokes.
- 1958 – The Soviet satellite Sputnik 2 falls from orbit after a mission duration of 162 days. This was the first spacecraft to carry a living animal, a female dog named Laika, who likely lived only a few hours.
- 1967 – Gnassingbé Eyadéma overthrows Nicolas Grunitzky and installs himself as the new President of Togo, a title he will hold for the next 38 years.
- 1978 – Tbilisi demonstrations: Thousands of Georgians demonstrate against Soviet attempts to change the constitutional status of the Georgian language.
- 1979 – The Progressive Alliance of Liberia stages a protest, without a permit, against an increase in rice prices proposed by the government, with clashes between protestors and the police resulting in over 70 deaths and over 500 injuries.
- 1981 – STS-1: The first operational Space Shuttle, Columbia, completes its first test flight.
- 1986 – The heaviest hailstones ever recorded, each weighing 1 kilogram (2.2 lb), fall on the Gopalganj district of Bangladesh, killing 92.
- 1988 – The USS Samuel B. Roberts strikes a mine in the Persian Gulf during Operation Earnest Will.
- 1988 – In a United Nations ceremony in Geneva, Switzerland, the Soviet Union signs an agreement pledging to withdraw its troops from Afghanistan.
- 1991 – The Republic of Georgia introduces the post of President following its declaration of independence from the Soviet Union.
- 1994 – In a friendly fire incident during Operation Provide Comfort in northern Iraq, two U.S. Air Force aircraft mistakenly shoot-down two U.S. Army helicopters, killing 26 people.
- 1997 – Pai Hsiao-yen, daughter of Taiwanese artiste Pai Bing-bing, is kidnapped on her way to school, preceding her murder.
- 1999 – NATO mistakenly bombs a convoy of ethnic Albanian refugees. Yugoslav officials say 75 people were killed.
- 1999 – A severe hailstorm strikes Sydney, Australia causing A$2.3 billion in insured damages, the most costly natural disaster in Australian history.
- 2001 – Series of bombings at Ramna Park in Dhaka during the Bengali New Year celebrations leave 10 people dead and dozens other injured.
- 2002 – Venezuelan president Hugo Chávez returns to office two days after being ousted and arrested by the country's military.
- 2003 – The Human Genome Project is completed with 99% of the human genome sequenced to an accuracy of 99.99%.
- 2003 – U.S. troops in Baghdad capture Abu Abbas, leader of the Palestinian group that killed an American on the hijacked cruise liner MS Achille Lauro in 1985.
- 2005 – The Oregon Supreme Court nullifies marriage licenses issued to same-sex couples a year earlier by Multnomah County.
- 2006 – Twin blasts triggered by crude bombs during Asr prayer in the Jama Masjid mosque in Delhi injure 13 people.
- 2014 – Two bombs detonate at a bus station in Nyanya, Nigeria, killing at least 88 people and injuring hundreds. Boko Haram claims responsibility.
- 2014 – Boko Haram abducts 276 girls from a school in Chibok, Nigeria.
- 2016 – The foreshock of a major earthquake occurs in Kumamoto, Japan.
- 2022 – Russian invasion of Ukraine: The Russian warship Moskva is struck by two anti-ship missiles and sinks into the Black Sea.
- 2023 – The Jupiter Icy Moons Explorer (JUICE) is launched by the European Space Agency.
- 2024 – Flooding in the Persian Gulf starts, killing 19 in Oman.

== Births ==
=== Pre-1600 ===
- 1126 – Averroes, Andalusian Arab physician and philosopher (died 1198)
- 1204 – Henry I, king of Castile (died 1217)
- 1331 – Jeanne-Marie de Maille, French Roman Catholic saint (died 1414)
- 1527 – Abraham Ortelius, Flemish cartographer and geographer (died 1598)
- 1572 – Adam Tanner, Austrian mathematician, philosopher, and academic (died 1632)
- 1578 – Philip III of Spain (died 1621)

=== 1601–1900 ===
- 1629 – Christiaan Huygens, Dutch mathematician, astronomer, and physicist (died 1695)
- 1669 – Magnus Julius De la Gardie, Swedish general and politician (died 1741)
- 1678 – Abraham Darby I, English iron master (died 1717)
- 1709 – Charles Collé, French playwright and songwriter (died 1783)
- 1714 – Adam Gib, Scottish minister and author (died 1788)
- 1738 – William Cavendish-Bentinck, 3rd Duke of Portland, English politician, Prime Minister of the United Kingdom (died 1809)
- 1769 – Barthélemy Catherine Joubert, French general (died 1799)
- 1773 – Jean-Baptiste de Villèle, French politician, Prime Minister of France (died 1854)
- 1788 – David G. Burnet, American politician, 2nd Vice-president of Texas (died 1870)
- 1800 – John Appold, English engineer (died 1865)
- 1812 – George Grey, Portuguese-New Zealand soldier, explorer, and politician, 11th Prime Minister of New Zealand (died 1898)
- 1814 – Dimitri Kipiani, Georgian publicist and author (died 1887)
- 1819 – Harriett Ellen Grannis Arey, American educator, author, editor, and publisher (died 1901)
- 1827 – Augustus Pitt Rivers, English general, ethnologist, and archaeologist (died 1900)
- 1852 – Alexander Greenlaw Hamilton, Australian biologist (died 1941)
- 1854 – Martin Lipp, Estonian pastor and poet (died 1923)
- 1857 – Princess Beatrice of the United Kingdom (died 1944)
- 1865 – Alfred Hoare Powell, English architect, and designer and painter of pottery (died 1960)
- 1866 – Anne Sullivan, American educator (died 1936)
- 1868 – Peter Behrens, German architect, designed the AEG turbine factory (died 1940)
- 1870 – Victor Borisov-Musatov, Russian painter and educator (died 1905)
- 1870 – Syd Gregory, Australian cricketer and coach (died 1929)
- 1872 – Abdullah Yusuf Ali, Indian-English scholar and translator (died 1953)
- 1874 – Matti Lonkainen, Finnish politician (died 1918)
- 1876 – Cecil Chubb, English barrister and one time owner of Stonehenge (died 1934)
- 1881 – Husain Salaahuddin, Maldivian poet and scholar (died 1948)
- 1882 – Moritz Schlick, German-Austrian physicist and philosopher (died 1936)
- 1886 – Ernst Robert Curtius, German philologist and scholar (died 1956)
- 1886 – Edward C. Tolman, American psychologist (died 1959)
- 1886 – Árpád Tóth, Hungarian poet and translator (died 1928)
- 1889 – Arnold J. Toynbee, English historian and academic (died 1975)
- 1889 – Efim Bogoljubow, Russian-German chess grandmaster (1889–1952)
- 1891 – B. R. Ambedkar, Indian economist, jurist, and politician, 1st Indian Minister of Law and Justice (died 1956)
- 1891 – Otto Lasanen, Finnish wrestler (died 1958)
- 1892 – Juan Belmonte, Spanish bullfighter (died 1962)
- 1892 – V. Gordon Childe, Australian archaeologist and philologist (died 1957)
- 1892 – Claire Windsor, American actress (died 1972)
- 1900 – Shivrampant Damle, Indian educationist (died 1977)

=== 1901–present ===
- 1902 – Sylvio Mantha, Canadian ice hockey player, coach, and referee (died 1974)
- 1903 – Henry Corbin, French philosopher and academic (died 1978)
- 1903 – Ruth Svedberg, Swedish discus thrower and triathlete (died 2002)
- 1904 – John Gielgud, English actor, director, and producer (died 2000)
- 1905 – Elizabeth Huckaby, American author and educator (died 1999)
- 1905 – Georg Lammers, German sprinter (died 1987)
- 1905 – Jean Pierre-Bloch, French author and activist (died 1999)
- 1906 – Faisal of Saudi Arabia, Saudi Arabian king (died 1975)
- 1907 – François Duvalier, Haitian physician and politician, 40th President of Haiti (died 1971)
- 1912 – Robert Doisneau, French photographer and journalist (died 1994)
- 1912 – Georg Siimenson, Estonian footballer (died 1978)
- 1913 – Jean Fournet, French conductor (died 2008)
- 1916 – Don Willesee, Australian telegraphist and politician, 29th Australian Minister for Foreign Affairs (died 2003)
- 1917 – Valerie Hobson, English actress (died 1998)
- 1917 – Marvin Miller, American baseball executive (died 2012)
- 1918 – Mary Healy, American actress and singer (died 2015)
- 1919 – Shamshad Begum, Pakistani-Indian singer (died 2013)
- 1919 – K. Saraswathi Amma, Indian author and playwright (died 1975)
- 1920 – Ivor Forbes Guest, English lawyer, historian, and author (died 2018)
- 1920 – Eleonore Schönborn, Austrian politician (died 2022)
- 1921 – Thomas Schelling, American economist and academic, Nobel Prize laureate (died 2016)
- 1922 – Audrey Long, American actress (died 2014)
- 1922 – Ali Akbar Khan, Hindustani musician (died 2009)
- 1923 – Roberto De Vicenzo, Argentinian golfer (died 2017)
- 1924 – Shorty Rogers, American trumpet player and composer (died 1994)
- 1924 – Joseph Ruskin, American actor and producer (died 2013)
- 1924 – Mary Warnock, Baroness Warnock, English philosopher, and academic (died 2019)
- 1925 – Abel Muzorewa, Zimbabwean minister and politician, 1st Prime Minister of Zimbabwe Rhodesia (died 2010)
- 1925 – Gene Ammons, American tenor saxophonist (died 1974)
- 1925 – Rod Steiger, American soldier and actor (died 2002)
- 1926 – Barbara Anderson, New Zealand author (died 2013)
- 1926 – Frank Daniel, Czech director, producer, and screenwriter (died 1996)
- 1926 – Gloria Jean, American actress and singer (died 2018)
- 1926 – Liz Renay, American actress and author (died 2007)
- 1927 – Alan MacDiarmid, New Zealand chemist and academic, Nobel Prize laureate (died 2007)
- 1927 – Dany Robin, French actress and singer (died 1995)
- 1929 – Gerry Anderson, English director, producer, and screenwriter (died 2012)
- 1929 – Inez Andrews, African-American singer-songwriter (died 2012)
- 1930 – Martin Adolf Bormann, German priest and theologian (died 2013)
- 1930 – Arnold Burns, American lawyer and politician, 21st United States Deputy Attorney General (died 2013)
- 1930 – René Desmaison, French mountaineer (died 2007)
- 1930 – Bradford Dillman, American actor and author (died 2018)
- 1931 – Geoffrey Dalton, English admiral (died 2020)
- 1931 – Paul Masnick, Canadian ice hockey player (died 2024)
- 1932 – Bill Bennett, Canadian lawyer and politician, 27th Premier of British Columbia (died 2015)
- 1932 – Atef Ebeid, Egyptian academic and politician, 47th Prime Minister of Egypt (died 2014)
- 1932 – Loretta Lynn, American singer-songwriter and musician (died 2022)
- 1932 – Cameron Parker, Scottish businessman and politician, Lord Lieutenant of Renfrewshire
- 1933 – Paddy Hopkirk, Northern Irish racing driver (died 2022)
- 1933 – Boris Strugatsky, Russian author (died 2012)
- 1933 – Yuri Oganessian, Armenian-Russian nuclear physicist
- 1934 – Fredric Jameson, American philosopher and theorist (died 2024)
- 1935 – Susan Cunliffe-Lister, Baroness Masham of Ilton, English table tennis player, swimmer, and politician (died 2023)
- 1935 – John Oliver, English bishop
- 1935 – Erich von Däniken, Swiss pseudohistorian and author (died 2026)
- 1936 – Arlene Martel, American actress and singer (died 2014)
- 1936 – Bobby Nichols, American golfer
- 1936 – Frank Serpico, American-Italian soldier, police officer and lecturer
- 1937 – Efi Arazi, Israeli businessman, founded the Scailex Corporation (died 2013)
- 1937 – Sepp Mayerl, Austrian mountaineer (died 2012)
- 1938 – Mahmud Esad Coşan, Turkish author and academic (died 2001)
- 1938 – Ralph Willis, Australian politician
- 1940 – Julie Christie, Indian-English actress and activist
- 1940 – David Hope, Baron Hope of Thornes, English archbishop and academic
- 1940 – Richard Thompson, English physician and academic
- 1941 – Pete Rose, American baseball player and manager (died 2024)
- 1942 – Valeriy Brumel, Soviet high jumper (died 2003)
- 1942 – Valentin Lebedev, Russian engineer and astronaut
- 1942 – Björn Rosengren, Swedish politician, Swedish Minister of Enterprise and Innovation
- 1944 – John Sergeant, English journalist
- 1945 – Ritchie Blackmore, English guitarist and songwriter
- 1945 – Roger Frappier, Canadian producer, director and screenwriter
- 1946 – Mireille Guiliano, French-American author
- 1946 – Michael Sarris, Cypriot economist and politician, Cypriot Minister of Finance
- 1946 – Knut Kristiansen, Norwegian pianist and orchestra leader
- 1947 – Dominique Baudis, French journalist and politician (died 2014)
- 1947 – Bob Massie, Australian cricketer
- 1948 – Berry Berenson, American model, actress, and photographer (died 2001)
- 1948 – Anastasios Papaligouras, Greek lawyer and politician, Greek Minister of Justice
- 1949 – Dave Gibbons, English author and illustrator
- 1949 – DeAnne Julius, American-British economist and academic
- 1949 – Chris Langham, English actor and screenwriter
- 1949 – Chas Mortimer, English motorcycle racer
- 1949 – John Shea, American actor and director
- 1950 – Francis Collins, American physician and geneticist
- 1950 – Péter Esterházy, Hungarian author (died 2016)
- 1951 – Milija Aleksic, English footballer (died 2012)
- 1951 – José Eduardo González Navas, Spanish politician
- 1951 – Julian Lloyd Webber, English cellist, conductor, and educator
- 1951 – Elizabeth Symons, Baroness Symons of Vernham Dean, English politician
- 1952 – Kenny Aaronson, American bass player
- 1952 – Mickey O'Sullivan, Irish footballer and manager
- 1952 – David Urquhart, Scottish bishop
- 1954 – Katsuhiro Otomo, Japanese director, screenwriter, and illustrator
- 1956 – Boris Šprem, Croatian lawyer and politician, 8th President of Croatian Parliament (died 2012)
- 1957 – Lothaire Bluteau, Canadian actor
- 1957 – Bobbi Brown, American make-up artist and author
- 1957 – Marc Platt, American producer
- 1957 – Mikhail Pletnev, Russian pianist, composer, and conductor
- 1958 – Peter Capaldi, Scottish actor
- 1958 – Jim Smith, English musician
- 1959 – Steve Byrnes, American sportscaster and producer (died 2015)
- 1959 – Marie-Thérèse Fortin, Canadian actress
- 1960 – Brad Garrett, American actor and comedian
- 1960 – Myoma Myint Kywe, Burmese historian and journalist (died 2021)
- 1960 – Osamu Sato, Japanese graphic artist, programmer, and composer
- 1960 – Tina Rosenberg, American journalist and author
- 1960 – Pat Symcox, South African cricketer
- 1961 – Robert Carlyle, Scottish actor and director
- 1962 – Guillaume Leblanc, Canadian athlete
- 1964 – Brian Adams, American wrestler (died 2007)
- 1964 – Jeff Andretti, American race car driver
- 1964 – Jim Grabb, American tennis player
- 1964 – Jeff Hopkins, Welsh international footballer and manager
- 1964 – Gina McKee, English actress
- 1965 – Tom Dey, American director and producer
- 1965 – Alexandre Jardin, French author
- 1965 – Craig McDermott, Australian cricketer and coach
- 1966 – André Boisclair, Canadian lawyer and politician
- 1966 – Jan Boklöv, Swedish ski jumper
- 1966 – David Justice, American baseball player and sportscaster
- 1966 – Greg Maddux, American baseball player, coach, and manager
- 1967 – Nicola Berti, Italian international footballer
- 1967 – Barrett Martin, American drummer, songwriter, and producer
- 1967 – Julia Zemiro, French-Australian actress, comedian, singer and writer
- 1968 – Anthony Michael Hall, American actor
- 1969 – Brad Ausmus, American baseball player and manager
- 1969 – Martyn LeNoble, Dutch-American bass player
- 1969 – Vebjørn Selbekk, Norwegian journalist
- 1970 – Shizuka Kudo, Japanese singer and actress
- 1971 – Miguel Calero, Colombian footballer and manager (died 2012)
- 1971 – Carlos Pérez, Dominican-American baseball player
- 1971 – Gregg Zaun, American baseball player and sportscaster
- 1972 – Paul Devlin, English-Scottish footballer and manager
- 1972 – Roberto Mejía, Dominican baseball player
- 1972 – Dean Potter, American rock climber and BASE jumper (died 2015)
- 1973 – Roberto Ayala, Argentinian footballer
- 1973 – Adrien Brody, American actor
- 1973 – Hidetaka Suehiro, Japanese video game director and writer
- 1973 – David Miller, American tenor
- 1974 – Da Brat, American rapper
- 1975 – Lita, American wrestler
- 1975 – Luciano Almeida, Brazilian footballer
- 1975 – Avner Dorman, Israeli-American composer and academic
- 1975 – Anderson Silva, Brazilian mixed martial artist and boxer
- 1976 – Christian Älvestam, Swedish singer-songwriter and guitarist
- 1976 – Georgina Chapman, English model, actress, and fashion designer, co-founded Marchesa
- 1976 – Anna DeForge, American basketball player
- 1976 – Kyle Farnsworth, American baseball player
- 1976 – Nadine Faustin-Parker, Haitian hurdler
- 1976 – Jason Wiemer, Canadian ice hockey player
- 1977 – Nate Fox, American basketball player (died 2014)
- 1977 – Martin Kaalma, Estonian footballer
- 1977 – Sarah Michelle Gellar, American actress
- 1977 – Rob McElhenney, American actor, producer, and screenwriter
- 1977 – Luke Priddis, Australian rugby league player
- 1978 – Roland Lessing, Estonian biathlete
- 1979 – David Crisafulli, Australian politician, 41st Premier of Queensland
- 1979 – Rebecca DiPietro, American wrestler and model
- 1979 – Marios Elia, Cypriot footballer
- 1979 – Ross Filipo, New Zealand rugby player
- 1979 – Noé Pamarot, French footballer
- 1979 – Kerem Tunçeri, Turkish basketball player
- 1980 – Win Butler, American-Canadian singer-songwriter and guitarist
- 1980 – Jeremy Smith, New Zealand rugby league player
- 1981 – Mustafa Güngör, German rugby player
- 1981 – Amy Leach, English director and producer
- 1982 – Uğur Boral, Turkish footballer
- 1982 – Larissa França, Brazilian volleyball player
- 1983 – Simona La Mantia, Italian triple jumper
- 1983 – James McFadden, Scottish footballer
- 1983 – William Obeng, Ghanaian-American football player
- 1983 – Nikoloz Tskitishvili, Georgian basketball player
- 1984 – Blake Costanzo, American football player
- 1984 – Charles Hamelin, Canadian speed skater
- 1984 – Harumafuji Kōhei, Mongolian sumo wrestler, the 70th Yokozuna
- 1984 – Tyler Thigpen, American football player
- 1986 – Matt Derbyshire, English footballer
- 1987 – Michael Baze, American jockey (died 2011)
- 1987 – Erwin Hoffer, Austrian footballer
- 1987 – Wilson Kiprop, Kenyan runner
- 1988 – Eric Gryba, Canadian ice hockey player
- 1988 – Eliška Klučinová, Czech heptathlete
- 1988 – Brad Sinopoli, Canadian football player
- 1988 – Anthony Modeste, French footballer
- 1989 – Joe Haden, American football player
- 1995 – Baker Mayfield, American football player
- 1995 – Georgie Friedrichs, Australian rugby sevens player
- 1996 – Abigail Breslin, American actress
- 1997 – D. J. Moore, American football player
- 1999 – Chase Young, American football player
- 2000 – Patrick Surtain II, American football player
- 2001 – Jalen Williams, American basketball player

== Deaths ==
=== Pre-1600 ===
- 911 – Pope Sergius III, pope of the Roman Catholic Church
- 1070 – Gerard, Duke of Lorraine (born c. 1030)
- 1099 – Conrad, Bishop of Utrecht (born before 1040)
- 1132 – Mstislav I of Kiev (born 1076)
- 1279 – Bolesław the Pious, Duke of Greater Poland (born 1224)
- 1322 – Bartholomew de Badlesmere, 1st Baron Badlesmere, English soldier and politician, Lord Warden of the Cinque Ports (born 1275)
- 1345 – Richard de Bury, English bishop and politician, Lord Chancellor of The United Kingdom (born 1287)
- 1424 – Lucia Visconti, English countess (born 1372)
- 1433 – Lidwina, Dutch saint (born 1380)
- 1471 – Richard Neville, 16th Earl of Warwick, English nobleman, known as "the Kingmaker" (born 1428)
- 1471 – John Neville, 1st Marquess of Montagu (born 1431)
- 1480 – Thomas de Spens, Scottish statesman and prelate (born c. 1415)
- 1488 – Girolamo Riario, Lord of Imola and Forli (born 1443)
- 1574 – Louis of Nassau (born 1538)
- 1578 – James Hepburn, 4th Earl of Bothwell, English husband of Mary, Queen of Scots (born 1534)
- 1587 – Edward Manners, 3rd Earl of Rutland (born 1548)
- 1599 – Henry Wallop, English politician (born 1540)

=== 1601–1900 ===
- 1609 – Gasparo da Salò, Italian violin maker (born 1540)
- 1649 – Tomás Treviño de Sobremonte, crypto-Jewish martyr
- 1662 – William Fiennes, 1st Viscount Saye and Sele, English politician (born 1582)
- 1682 – Avvakum, Russian priest and saint (born 1620)
- 1721 – Michel Chamillart, French politician, Controller-General of Finances (born 1652)
- 1740 – Lady Catherine Jones, English philanthropist (born 1672)
- 1759 – George Frideric Handel, German-English organist and composer (born 1685)
- 1785 – William Whitehead, English poet and playwright (born 1715)
- 1792 – Maximilian Hell, Slovak-Hungarian astronomer and priest (born 1720)
- 1843 – Joseph Lanner, Austrian violinist and composer (born 1801)
- 1864 – Charles Lot Church, American-Canadian politician (born 1777)
- 1886 – Anna Louisa Geertruida Bosboom-Toussaint, Dutch novelist (born 1812)
- 1888 – Emil Czyrniański, Polish chemist (born 1824)

=== 1901–present ===
- 1910 – Mikhail Vrubel, Russian painter and sculptor (born 1856)
- 1911 – Addie Joss, American baseball player and journalist (born 1880)
- 1911 – Henri Elzéar Taschereau, Canadian lawyer and jurist, 4th Chief Justice of Canada (born 1836)
- 1912 – Henri Brisson, French politician, 50th Prime Minister of France (born 1835)
- 1914 – Hubert Bland, English activist, co-founded the Fabian Society (born 1855)
- 1916 – Gina Krog, Norwegian suffragist and women's rights activist (born 1847)
- 1917 – L. L. Zamenhof, Polish physician and linguist, created Esperanto (born 1859)
- 1919 – Auguste-Réal Angers, Canadian judge and politician, 6th Lieutenant Governor of Quebec (born 1837)
- 1925 – John Singer Sargent, American painter (born 1856)
- 1930 – Vladimir Mayakovsky, Georgian-Russian actor, playwright, and poet (born 1893)
- 1931 – Richard Armstedt, German philologist, historian, and educator (born 1851)
- 1935 – Emmy Noether, German-American mathematician and academic (born 1882)
- 1938 – Gillis Grafström, Swedish figure skater and architect (born 1893)
- 1943 – Yakov Dzhugashvili, Georgian-Russian lieutenant (born 1907)
- 1950 – Ramana Maharshi, Indian guru and philosopher (born 1879)
- 1951 – Al Christie, Canadian-American director, producer, and screenwriter (born 1881)
- 1962 – M. Visvesvaraya, Indian engineer and scholar (born 1860)
- 1963 – Rahul Sankrityayan, Indian monk and historian (born 1893)
- 1964 – Tatyana Afanasyeva, Russian-Dutch mathematician and theorist (born 1876)
- 1964 – Rachel Carson, American biologist and author (born 1907)
- 1968 – Al Benton, American baseball player (born 1911)
- 1969 – Matilde Muñoz Sampedro, Spanish actress (born 1900)
- 1975 – Günter Dyhrenfurth, German-Swiss mountaineer, geologist, and explorer (born 1886)
- 1975 – Fredric March, American actor (born 1897)
- 1976 – José Revueltas, Mexican author and activist (born 1914)
- 1978 – Joe Gordon, American baseball player and manager (born 1915)
- 1978 – F. R. Leavis, English educator and critic (born 1895)
- 1983 – Pete Farndon, English bassist (The Pretenders) (born 1952)
- 1983 – Gianni Rodari, Italian journalist and author (born 1920)
- 1983 – Ben Dunne, founder of Dunnes Stores (born 1908)
- 1986 – Simone de Beauvoir, French novelist and philosopher (born 1908)
- 1990 – Thurston Harris, American singer (born 1931)
- 1990 – Olabisi Onabanjo, Nigerian politician, 3rd Governor of Ogun State (born 1927)
- 1991 – Randolfo Pacciardi, centre-left Italian politician (born 1899)
- 1992 – Irene Greenwood, Australian radio broadcaster and feminist and peace activist (born 1898)
- 1994 – Salimuzzaman Siddiqui, Pakistani chemist and scholar (born 1897)
- 1995 – Burl Ives, American actor, folk singer, and writer (born 1909)
- 1999 – Ellen Corby, American actress and screenwriter (born 1911)
- 1999 – Anthony Newley, English singer-songwriter and actor (born 1931)
- 1999 – Bill Wendell, American television announcer (born 1924)
- 2000 – Phil Katz, American computer programmer, co-created the zip file format (born 1962)
- 2000 – August R. Lindt, Swiss lawyer and politician (born 1905)
- 2000 – Wilf Mannion, English footballer (born 1918)
- 2001 – Jim Baxter, Scottish footballer (born 1939)
- 2001 – Hiroshi Teshigahara, Japanese director, producer, and screenwriter (born 1927)
- 2003 – Jyrki Otila, Finnish politician (born 1941)
- 2004 – Micheline Charest, English-Canadian television producer, co-founded the Cookie Jar Group (born 1953)
- 2006 – Mahmut Bakalli, Kosovo politician (born 1936)
- 2007 – June Callwood, Canadian journalist, author, and activist (born 1924)
- 2007 – Don Ho, American singer and ukulele player (born 1930)
- 2007 – René Rémond, French historian and economist (born 1918)
- 2008 – Tommy Holmes, American baseball player and manager (born 1917)
- 2008 – Ollie Johnston, American animator and voice actor (born 1912)
- 2009 – Maurice Druon, French author (born 1918)
- 2010 – Israr Ahmed, Pakistani theologian and scholar (born 1932)
- 2010 – Alice Miller, Polish-French psychologist and author (born 1923)
- 2010 – Peter Steele, American singer-songwriter and bass player (born 1962)
- 2011 – Jean Gratton, Canadian Roman Catholic bishop (born 1924)
- 2012 – Émile Bouchard, Canadian ice hockey player and coach (born 1919)
- 2012 – Jonathan Frid, Canadian actor (born 1924)
- 2012 – Piermario Morosini, Italian footballer (born 1986)
- 2013 – Efi Arazi, Israeli businessman, founded the Scailex Corporation (born 1937)
- 2013 – Colin Davis, English conductor and educator (born 1927)
- 2013 – R. P. Goenka, Indian businessman, founded RPG Group (born 1930)
- 2013 – George Jackson, American singer-songwriter (born 1945)
- 2013 – Armando Villanueva, Peruvian politician, 121st Prime Minister of Peru (born 1915)
- 2013 – Charlie Wilson, American politician (born 1943)
- 2014 – Nina Cassian, Romanian poet and critic (born 1924)
- 2014 – Crad Kilodney, American-Canadian author (born 1948)
- 2014 – Wally Olins, English businessman and academic (born 1930)
- 2014 – Mick Staton, American soldier and politician (born 1940)
- 2015 – Klaus Bednarz, German journalist and author (born 1942)
- 2015 – Mark Reeds, Canadian-American ice hockey player and coach (born 1960)
- 2015 – Percy Sledge, American singer (born 1940)
- 2015 – Roberto Tucci, Italian cardinal and theologian (born 1921)
- 2019 – Bibi Andersson, Swedish actress (born 1935)
- 2020 – Carol D'Onofrio, American public health researcher (born 1936)
- 2021 – Bernie Madoff, American mastermind of the world's largest Ponzi scheme (born 1938)
- 2022 – Mike Bossy, Canadian ice hockey player and sportscaster (born 1957)
- 2022 – Ilkka Kanerva, Finnish politician (born 1948)
- 2022 – Orlando Julius, Nigerian saxophonist, singer (born 1943)
- 2023 – Mark Sheehan, Irish guitarist (The Script) (born 1976)
- 2024 – Ken Holtzman, American baseball player (born 1945)
- 2025 – Abdullah Ahmad Badawi, Malaysian civil servant and politician, 5th Prime Minister of Malaysia (born 1939)

== Holidays and observances ==
- Ambedkar Jayanti (India)
- Bengali New Year (Bangladesh)
- Black Day (South Korea)
- Burt Gummer Day
- Cake and Cunnilingus Day
- Christian feast day:
  - Anthony, John, and Eustathius
  - Bénézet
  - Henry Beard Delany (U.S. Episcopal Church)
  - Domnina of Terni
  - Lidwina
  - Peter González
  - Tiburtius, Valerian, and Maximus
  - April 14 (Eastern Orthodox liturgics)
- Commemoration of Anfal Genocide Against the Kurds (Iraqi Kurdistan)
- Day of Mologa (Yaroslavl Oblast, Russia)
- Day of the Georgian language (Georgia)
- Dhivehi Language Day (Maldives)
- N'Ko Alphabet Day (Mande speakers)
- Pan American Day (several countries in the Americas)
- Takayama Spring Festival begins (Takayama, Gifu Prefecture, Japan)
- Vaisakhi (Since 2011)
- Youth Day (Angola)
- World Quantum Day

== Sources ==
- Marcus Tullius Cicero. Philippicae. Vol. XIV.
