= Christodoulou =

Christodoulou (Greek: Χριστοδούλου) is a surname of Greek origin, the genitive form of the first name Christodoulos (Greek: Χριστόδουλος, "Servant of Christ").

- Adam Christodoulou (born 1989), British racing driver
- Anastasios Christodoulou (1932–2002), Cypriot university administrator, Secretary General of the Association of Commonwealth Universities, Foundation Secretary of the British Open University
- Andreas Christodoulou (footballer, born 1934), Cypriot football player
- Andreas Christodoulou (footballer, born 1997), Cypriot football player
- Antreas Christodoulou, or Andreas (born 1995), Cypriot basketball player
- Apostolos Christodoulou (1856–1917), Greek priest, theologist and bishop
- Charlie Christodoulou (c.1951–1976), British soldier and mercenary
- Christodoulos Christodoulou (born 1939), Cypriot economist, lawyer and politician
- Christos Christodoulou (born 1961), Greek basketball player
- Daisy Christodoulou, British educationalist, head of education research at the charity Ark
- Demetrios Christodoulou (born 1951), Greek mathematician and physicist
- Efthymios Christodoulou (born 1932), Greek economist and banker
- Evangelia Christodoulou (born 1983), Greek gymnast
- Fanis Christodoulou (born 1965), Greek basketball player
- Georgios Christodoulou (born 1965), Cypriot football player
- Georgios Christodoulou (footballer, born 1967), Greek football player
- Georgios Christodoulou (footballer, born 1997), Cypriot football player
- John Christodoulou (born 1965), Cyprus-born British billionaire property developer
- Jon Christos (born John Christodoulou, 1976), English singer, pianist, arranger, conductor and radio personality
- Kostas Christodoulou (born 1915), Greek football player and manager
- Konstantinos Christodoulou (born 1986), Greek track cyclist
- Louis Christodoulou (born 1967), Australian soccer player
- Maria Christodoulou (born 1980), Greek synchronized swimmer
- Marios Christodoulou (born 1974), Cypriot football player
- Monika Christodoulou (born 1985), Greek singer-songwriter
- Nico Christodoulou (born 2005), Canadian racing driver
- Nikolaos Christodoulou (1863–c.1924), Greek army general
- Nikos Christodoulou (born 1959), Greek conductor and composer
- Pambos Christodoulou (born 1967), Cypriot football player and manager
- Petros Christodoulou (born 1960), Greek economist and banker
- Riki Christodoulou (born 1988), British racing driver
- Stanley Christodoulou (born 1946), South African boxing referee
- Stavros Christodoulou (born 1963), Cypriot writer
- Stella Christodoulou (born 1991), Greek volleyball player
- Theodoros Christodoulou (born 1977), Cypriot alpine skier

== See also ==
- Charlie Crist (born 1956), Governor of Florida, whose surname is derived from 'Christodoulou'
