= Sotiroulla Charalambous =

Cypriot politician (born 1963)

- Σωτηρούλα Χαραλάμπους
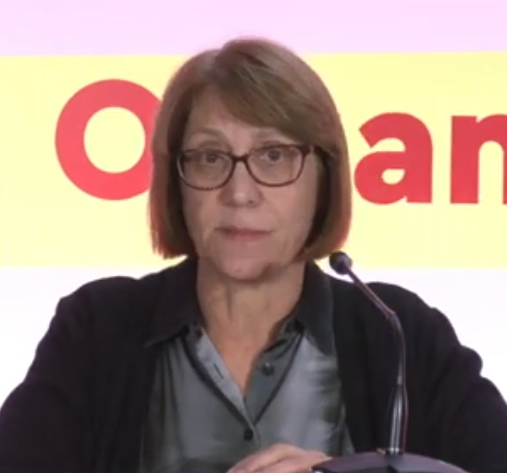
- Charalambous in 2024

Minister of Labour and Social Insurance
- In office 29 February 2008 – 28 February 2013
- President: Demetris Christofias
- Preceded by: Antonis Vassiliou
- Succeeded by: Harris Georgiades

Member of the House of Representatives of Cyprus
- In office May 2001 – 29 February 2008
- Constituency: Famagusta

Personal details
- Born: 25 December 1963 (age 62) Agios Memnon, Famagusta, Cyprus
- Party: AKEL
- Occupation: Politician, trade unionist

Sotiroulla Charalambous (Greek: Σωτηρούλα Χαραλάμπους; born 25 December 1963) is a Cypriot politician and trade unionist who served as minister of labour and social insurance from 2008 to 2013. She served as a member of the House of Representatives from 2001 to 2008 as a member of the Progressive Party of Working People (AKEL). In December 2021, she was elected general secretary of the Pancyprian Federation of Labour.

== Early life and career ==
Charalambous was born in Agios Memnon, Famagusta, Cyprus. She obtained a Master of Arts in political and social science from the Academy of Social Science and Social Administration in Sofia, Bulgaria.

Charalambous has had an extensive career in trade union leadership, working for the Pancyprian Federation of Labour (PEO) since 1986. She has held various roles within the organization, including secretary of the working women's central office, executive secretary, central organizational secretary, and deputy general secretary. She also served as the PEO representative to the National Agency for Women's Rights. In December 2021, she was elected general secretary of PEO at its 28th Congress, becoming the first woman to hold the position. She succeeded Pambos Kyritsis, who had held the role for 23 years.

Charalambous has also served as an associate judge of the Industrial Disputes Court and as a member of the executive of the Pancyprian Federation of Women's Organizations (POGO).

== Political career ==
Charalambous was elected to the House of Representatives in the legislative election of 27 May 2001. She represented the Famagusta constituency for AKEL and was re-elected in the 2006 legislative election. During her tenure, she served as chair of the Parliamentary Committee on Labour and Social Insurance and the Parliamentary Committee on Equal Opportunities. She was also a member of the Committee on Financial and Budgetary Affairs.

On 29 February 2008, Charalambous was appointed minister of labour and social insurance by President Demetris Christofias. She was one of three ministers who remained in cabinet following the explosion at the Evangelos Florakis Naval Base on 11 July 2011, which led to the resignation of several ministers. She served in the role until 28 February 2013, when a new cabinet was appointed by President Nicos Anastasiades.

She has also been a member of the Central Committee of AKEL.

== Personal life ==
She is married to Nicos Charalambous and has two daughters and a son.
