= Christodoulos =

Greek given name meaning "Servant of Christ"

Christodoulos (Χριστόδουλος) is a Greek given name. It is a theophoric name which means "servant of Christ". It can refer to:

- Christodoulos (Greek patriarch of Alexandria), r. 907–932
- Pope Christodoulos of Alexandria, Coptic patriarch in 1047–1077
- Christodoulos of Patmos (died 1093), Byzantine monk
- Christodulus (died 1131), the first emir of Palermo (later ammiratus ammiratorum)
- Christodoulos Aronis, a Greek fine artist, professor and priest (1884–1973)
- Archbishop Christodoulos of Athens (1939–2008)
- Christodoulos Christodoulou (born 1939), a Cypriot economist, lawyer and a politician
- Christodoulos Moisa (born 1948), a New Zealand poet, artist, photographer, writer, essayist and art teacher
- Christodoulos Neophytou (born 1950), a Cypriot economist
- Christodoulos Christodoulides (born 1976), a Cypriot judoka who won the silver medal at the 2002 Commonwealth Games

== See also ==
- Christodoulou - Greek surname that means "son of Christodoulos"
