= Vassos =

Vassos is both a surname and a given name. Notable people by that name include:

== Surname ==
- John Vassos (1898–1985), American industrial designer and artist
- Timoleon Vassos (1836–1929), Greek Army officer and general

== Given name ==
- Vassos Alexander, British sports reporter
- Vassos Karageorghis (1929–2021), Cypriot archaeologist
- Vassos Lyssarides (1920–2021), Cypriot politician and physician
- Vassos Melanarkitis (born 1972), Cypriot former footballer
- Vassos Shiarly (born 1948), British Cypriot banker
