= Zeta Emilianidou =

Cypriot lawyer and politician (1954–2022)

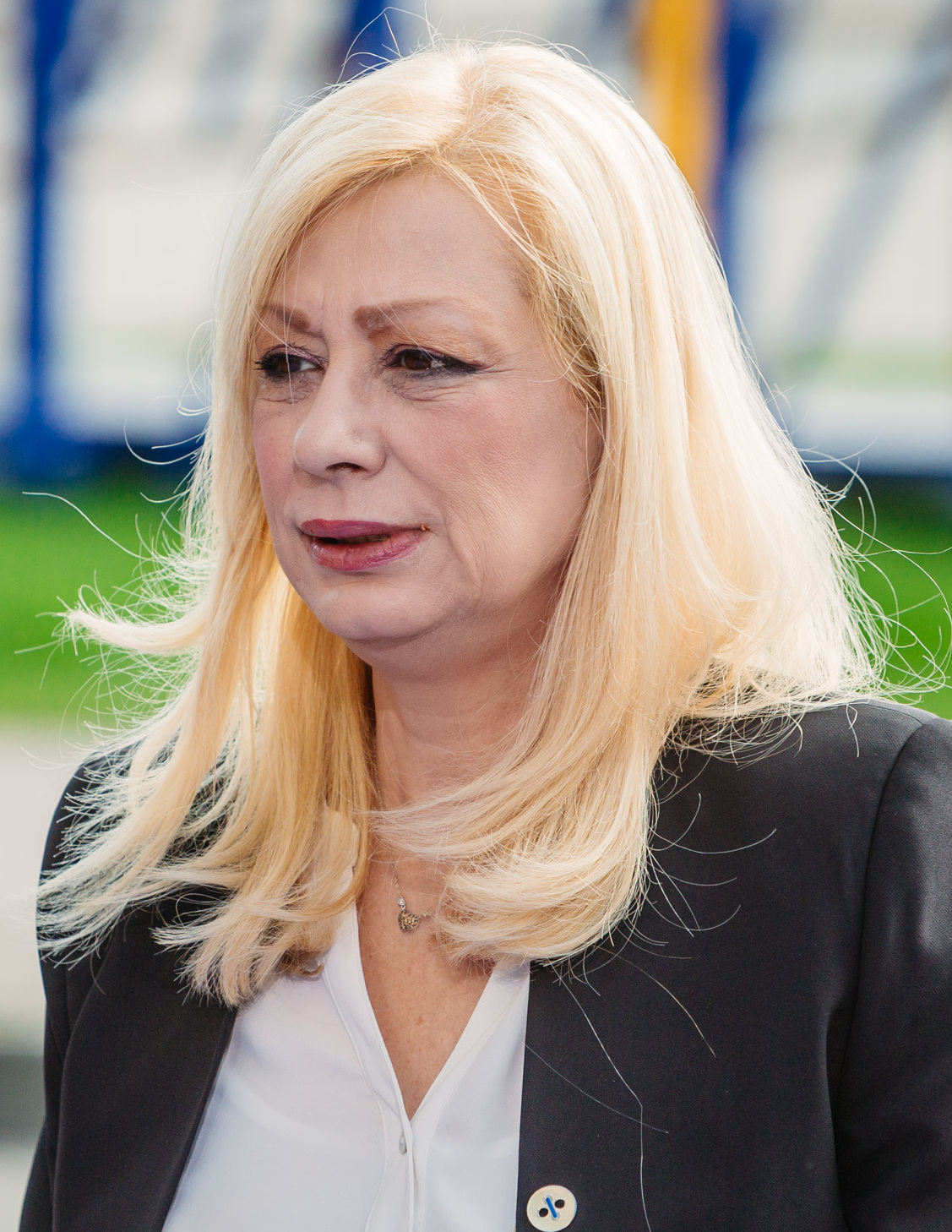
- Emilianidou in 2017

Minister of Labour and Social Security
- In office 4 April 2013 – 6 June 2022
- President: Nicos Anastasiades
- Preceded by: Harris Georgiades
- Succeeded by: Kyriakos Kousios

Personal details
- Born: 2 September 1954 Nicosia, British Cyprus
- Died: 6 June 2022 (aged 67) Marousi, Athens, Greece
- Party: Independent
- Education: Aristotle University of Thessaloniki; Cyprus Institute of Marketing

Zeta Emilianidou (Greek: Ζέτα Αιμιλιανίδου; 2 September 1954 – 6 June 2022) was a Cypriot lawyer and politician, who served as the Minister of Labour and Social Security of Cyprus from 2013 until her death in 2022.

== Career ==
Emilianidou was born on 2 September 1954 in Nicosia, then British Cyprus, and received a degree in law from the Aristotle University of Thessaloniki and a master's degree in marketing from the Cyprus Institute of Marketing. After passing the Cyprus Bar Association examinations, she began practicing law in 1978. The following year she was appointed to work in the Customs Department. Between 1988 and 1992 she was a member of the team in charge of designing the VAT and developing its legislation. In 1992, Emilianidou became a senior VAT officer and four years later, in 1996, she was appointed first customs officer.

On 2 May 2000, Emilianidou was appointed Deputy Director of the VAT Customs and Registry Department, and from 15 August 2001 until 14 March 2010 she was the Director of the VAT Customs and Registry Department, being also a member of the board of directors of the Cyprus Ports Authority. She was also part of the negotiation of the entrance of Cyprus to the European Union in 2004, in charge of customs legislation.

In 2010 Emilianidou joined the Ministry of Energy, Commerce, Industry and Tourism, where she became its general director. In this position, which she held until 2 April 2013, she worked on issues such as the gradual diversification of the country's energy balance with the integration of natural gas and renewable energies, the attraction of foreign investment, the development of marinas or the creation of new golf courses. She also served as chairwoman of the Cyprus Energy Foundation and the Special Fund for Renewable Energy Sources and Energy Saving.

=== Minister of Labour ===
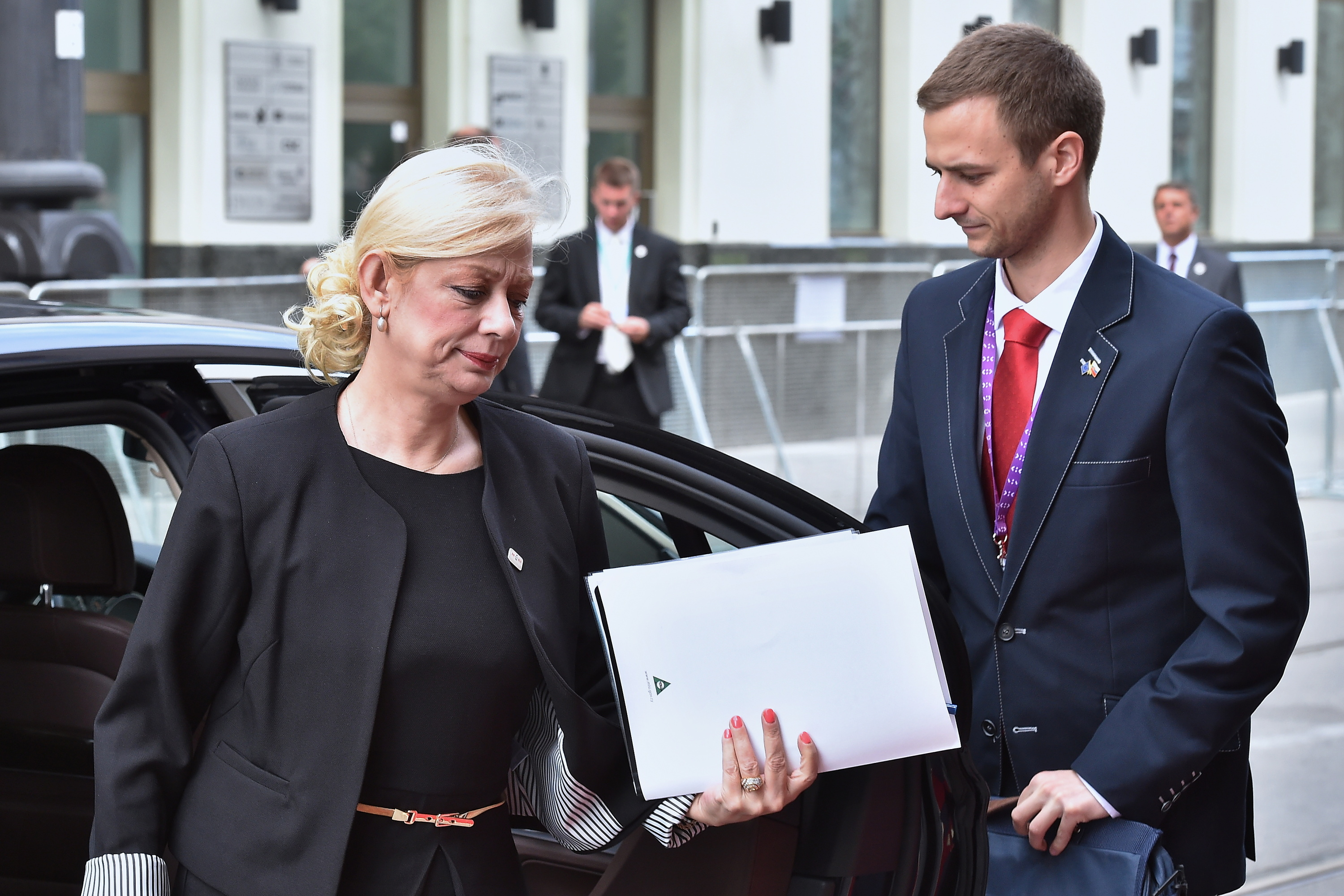
Emilianidou addressing a meeting of the Council of the European Union in 2016

On 2 April 2013, it was announced that Emilianidou would succeed Harris Georgiades as Minister of Labour; she took office the following day, becoming the first woman to serve in Nico Anastasiades' cabinet. After Anastasiades was re-elected in the 2018 presidential election, Emilianidou was re-appointed Minister of Labour.

During her term as minister, Emilianidou promoted the guaranteed minimum income, the creation of the vice-ministry of social welfare, an increase in the income of low-income pensioners, a care allowance, subsidized four-day vacations, widow's pension for men under the same conditions as women, paid paternity leave, introduced a special pension for those over 50 years old with thalassemia, the creation of the Women's House for victims of domestic violence, and the recognition of maternity through surrogate mothers, among other moves.

Due to the COVID-19 pandemic in Cyprus, Emilianidou implemented the special employee support schemes, which the labor ministry estimated in November 2020 to have prevented a rise in unemployment.

== Personal life and death ==
On 15 May 2022, Emilianidou suffered a brain aneurysm and was immediately transferred to Ygeia Medical Center in Athens, Greece, where she underwent surgery. Emilianidou died on 6 June 2022 at the age of 67. Three days of mourning were declared beginning on 6 June. The funeral took place on 10 June at Holy Temple of the Wisdom of God in Strovolos and later her body buried in Nicosia's Constantine and Helen Cemetery.

Emilianidou's husband, also a lawyer, died in 2017, aged 70.

== Books ==
- Value Added Tax in Cyprus (1992).
