= List of ministers of finance of Cyprus =

List of ministers of finance of the Republic of Cyprus since independence in 1960:

Minister	Began	Ended
Reginos Theocharis	16 August 1960	1 July 1962
Renos Solomides	2 July 1962	23 June 1968
Andreas Patsalides	24 June 1968	31 October 1979
Afxentios Afxentiou	1 November 1979	19 April 1982
Simos Vasiliou	20 April 1982	6 January 1985
Constantinos Kittis	7 January 1985	28 July 1985
Christos Mavrellis	1 August 1985	27 February 1988
George Syrimis	28 February 1988	27 February 1993
Fedros Economides	28 February 1993	6 November 1994
Christodoulos Christodoulou	7 November 1994	18 March 1999
Takis Klerides	19 March 1999	28 February 2003
Markos Kyprianou	1 March 2003	18 May 2004
Makis Keravnos	19 May 2004	30 August 2005
Michael Sarris	31 August 2005	28 February 2008
Charilaos Stavrakis	29 February 2008	5 August 2011
Kikis Kazamias	6 August 2011	23 March 2012
Vassos Shiarly	24 March 2012	1 March 2013
Michael Sarris	2 March 2013	2 April 2013
Harris Georgiades	3 April 2013	2 December 2019
Constantinos Petrides	3 December 2019	28 February 2023
Makis Keravnos	1 March 2023	incumbent
