= Constantinos Petrides =

Cypriot politician (born 1974)

- Κωνσταντίνος Πετρίδης
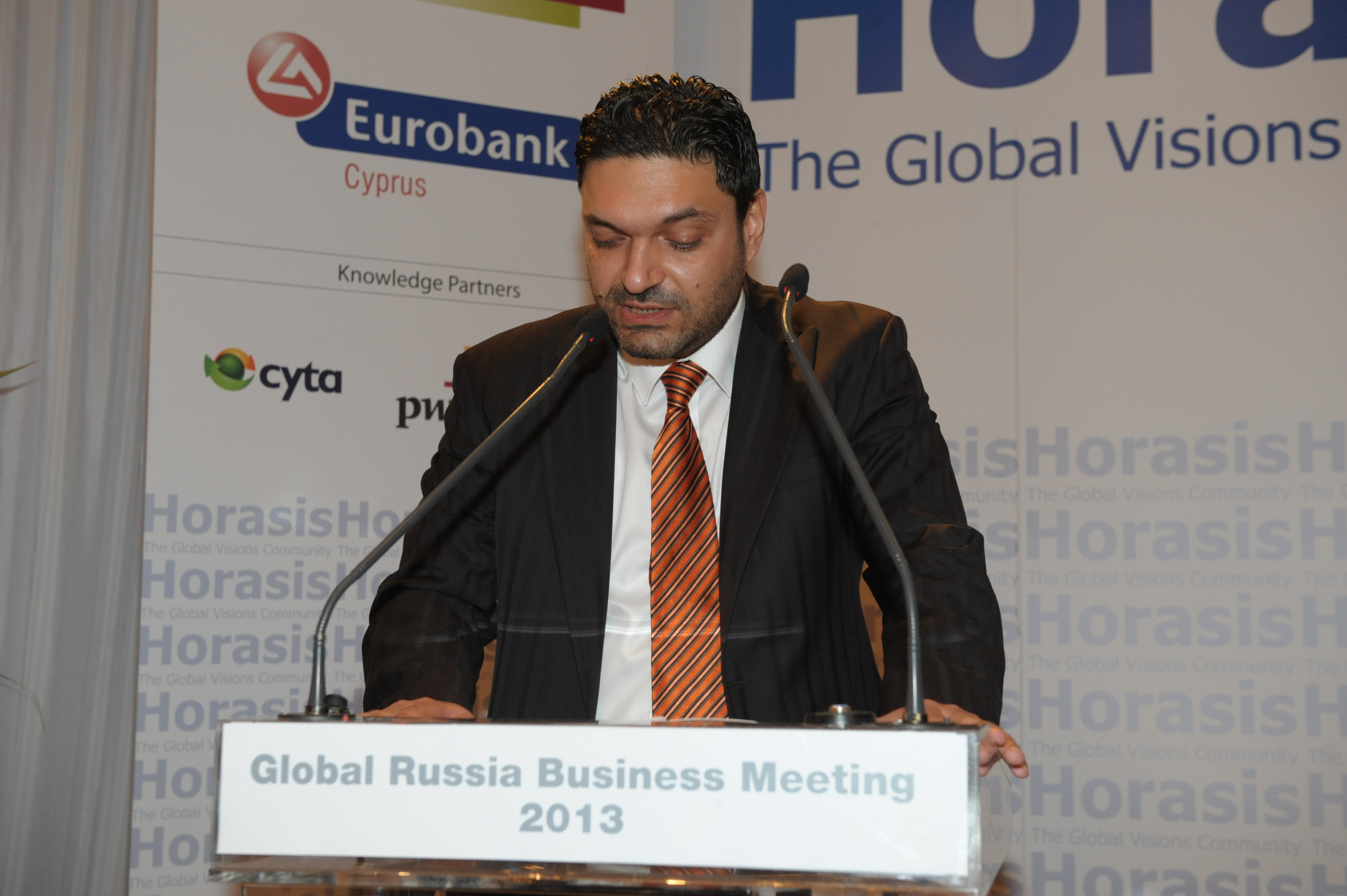
- Petrides in 2013

Minister of Finance of Cyprus
- In office 3 December 2019 – 28 February 2023
- President: Nicos Anastasiades
- Preceded by: Harris Georgiades
- Succeeded by: Makis Keravnos

Minister of Interior of Cyprus
- In office 11 May 2017 – 3 December 2019
- President: Nicos Anastasiades
- Preceded by: Socratis Hasikos
- Succeeded by: Nicos Nouris

Deputy Minister to the President of Cyprus
- In office 1 March 2013 – 8 May 2017
- President: Nicos Anastasiades
- Preceded by: Titos Christofides
- Succeeded by: Vasilis Palmas

Personal details
- Born: 1 July 1974 (age 52) Nicosia, Cyprus
- Party: Democratic Rally
- Education: University of Nottingham; London School of Economics
- Profession: Economist

Constantinos Petrides (Greek: Κωνσταντίνος Πετρίδης; born 1 July 1974) is a Cypriot politician. He served as Minister of Finance, Minister of Interior, and Deputy Minister to the President of Cyprus at various times during the presidency of Nicos Anastasiades. Petrides is also one of the six candidates representing the Democratic Rally in the 2024 European Parliament Elections.

== Education and Career ==
Constantinos Petrides was born on July 1, 1974, in Nicosia. He graduated from The English School, in Nicosia and served in the National Guard as a reserve infantry officer. He studied Economics at the University of Nottingham and subsequently obtained a Master's degree in Political Economy of Transition in Europe from the London School of Economics.

In 2000, he worked at the Cyprus – European Union Relations Directorate at the Planning Bureau, as part of the negotiations for Cyprus' accession to the European Union. From 2000 to 2006, he served as a Senior Officer at the Association of Cyprus Banks and represented the Association at the European Banking Federation and the National Preparatory Committee for the adoption of the euro.

From 2006 to 2011, he was employed at the European Commission in Brussels as an economist in the Directorate-General for Agriculture and the Directorate-General for Competition.

During his tenure at the European Commission he served as a negotiator in trade liberalisation agreements between the EU and third countries and worked on issues related to public subsidies in the transport sector.

In 2011, he assumed the position of Director of the Office of the President of the Democratic Rally, Nicos Anastasiades.

== Political career ==
On March 1, 2013, Petrides was appointed Deputy Minister to the President in the government of Nicos Anastasiades, a position he held until May 8, 2017.

On May 11, 2017, he was appointed Minister of Interior, before stepping down on December 3, 2019, to assume the role of Minister of Finance.

On February 10, 2024, it was announced that Petrides would be one of the six candidates representing the Democratic Rally in the 2024 European Parliament Elections, after finishing second in the party's internal election.
