= Charilaos Stavrakis =

Cypriot banker, businessman and politician

- Χαρίλαος Σταυράκης

Cypriot Minister of Finance
- In office 29 February 2008 – 5 August 2011
- President: Demetris Christofias
- Preceded by: Michael Sarris
- Succeeded by: Kikis Kazamias

Personal details
- Born: 1956 (age 69–70) Nicosia, Cyprus
- Profession: Economist, businessman, politician

Charilaos G. Stavrakis (Greek: Χαρίλαος Γ. Σταυράκης; born 1956) is a Cypriot banker, businessman and a politician. He served as a Finance Minister of Cyprus from 29 February 2008 until 5 August 2011.

== Education ==
Stavrakis studied Economics at the University of Cambridge. He was later accepted to Harvard Business School (HBS), from which he obtained his MBA in 1981. He is also a member of the Chartered Institute of Bankers in Scotland (ACIB).

== Banking career ==
Stavrakis made his banking career primarily in the Bank of Cyprus. There he held several key positions including Senior Manager of Treasury International Services, Head of Strategic Planning & Business Development, Group general manager International Banking and general manager of CISCO, the investment division of the Bank.

Stavrakis also worked at the Bank of Cyprus (Australia), the Bank of Cyprus (Channel Islands), the Bank of Cyprus (AEDAK), the Bank of Cyprus (Mutual Funds) and BOC Ventures. Finally, in 2005 he was appointed chief executive officer for Cyprus operations and Deputy Group CEO. In February 2008, the President of the Republic of Cyprus Demetris Christofias, appointed him as Finance Minister of Cyprus, where he served until August 2011.

== European Debt Crisis ==
In his 2009 opening speech at the ceremony of the Commonwealth Finance Ministers Annual meeting in Limassol, Stavrakis stated that the impact of the crisis on the real economy has become evident in 2009 with the second half of 2009 proving to be particularly challenging. The Government of Cyprus responded to the crisis with a Strategic Plan of around EUR 350 million (close to 2% of GDP). In the same year president Demetris Christofias publicly vetoed spending cuts decided by Charilaos Stavrakis and a year or so later publicly denounced measures agreed by Kikis Kazamias with the opposition parties.

== Affiliations ==
- Served as president of the board of directors of the Electricity Authority of Cyprus.
- Served on the board of directors of the Cyprus Oil Refinery

Preceded by Michael Sarris	Finance Minister of Cyprus; 2008–2011	Succeeded by Kikis Kazamias
