= List of ministers of labour and social insurance of Cyprus =

List of ministers of labour and social insurance of the Republic of Cyprus since the independence in 1960:

Minister	Began	Ended
Polykarpos Yiorkatzis	5 May, 1960	15 August, 1960
Tassos Papadopoulos	16 August, 1960	24 June, 1970
Andreas Mavrommatis	1 July, 1970	15 June, 1972
Markos Spanos	16 June, 1972	15 July, 1974
Panicos Sivitanides	08 August, 1974	15 January, 1975
Markos Spanos (2nd term)	15 January, 1975	8 March, 1978
Emilios Theodoulou	9 March, 1978	9 September, 1980
Georgios Stavrinakis	10 September, 1980	19 April, 1982
Pavlos Papageorgiou	20 April, 1982	6 January, 1985
Andreas Moushiouttas	7 January, 1985	28 February, 1988
Takis Hristifedes	29 February, 1988	3 May, 1990
Iacovos Aristidou	4 May, 1990	27 February, 1993
Andreas Moushouttas	28 February, 1993	10 November, 1997
Evstathios Papadakis	11 November, 1997	27 February, 1998
Andreas Moushouttas	28 February, 1998	28 February, 2003
Makis Keravnos	3 March, 2003	18 May, 2004
Christos Taliadoros	19 May, 2004	8 May, 2006
Antonis Vassiliou	9 May, 2006	29 February, 2008
Sotiroula Charalambous	1 March 2008	3 April 2013
Zeta Emilianidou	3 April 2013	6 June 2022
Kyriakos Kousios	27 June 2022	28 February 2023
Giannis Panayiotou	1 March 2023	8 December 2025
Marinos Moushouttas	8 December 2025	
