= Markos Kyprianou =

Cypriot politician

- Μάρκος Κυπριανού
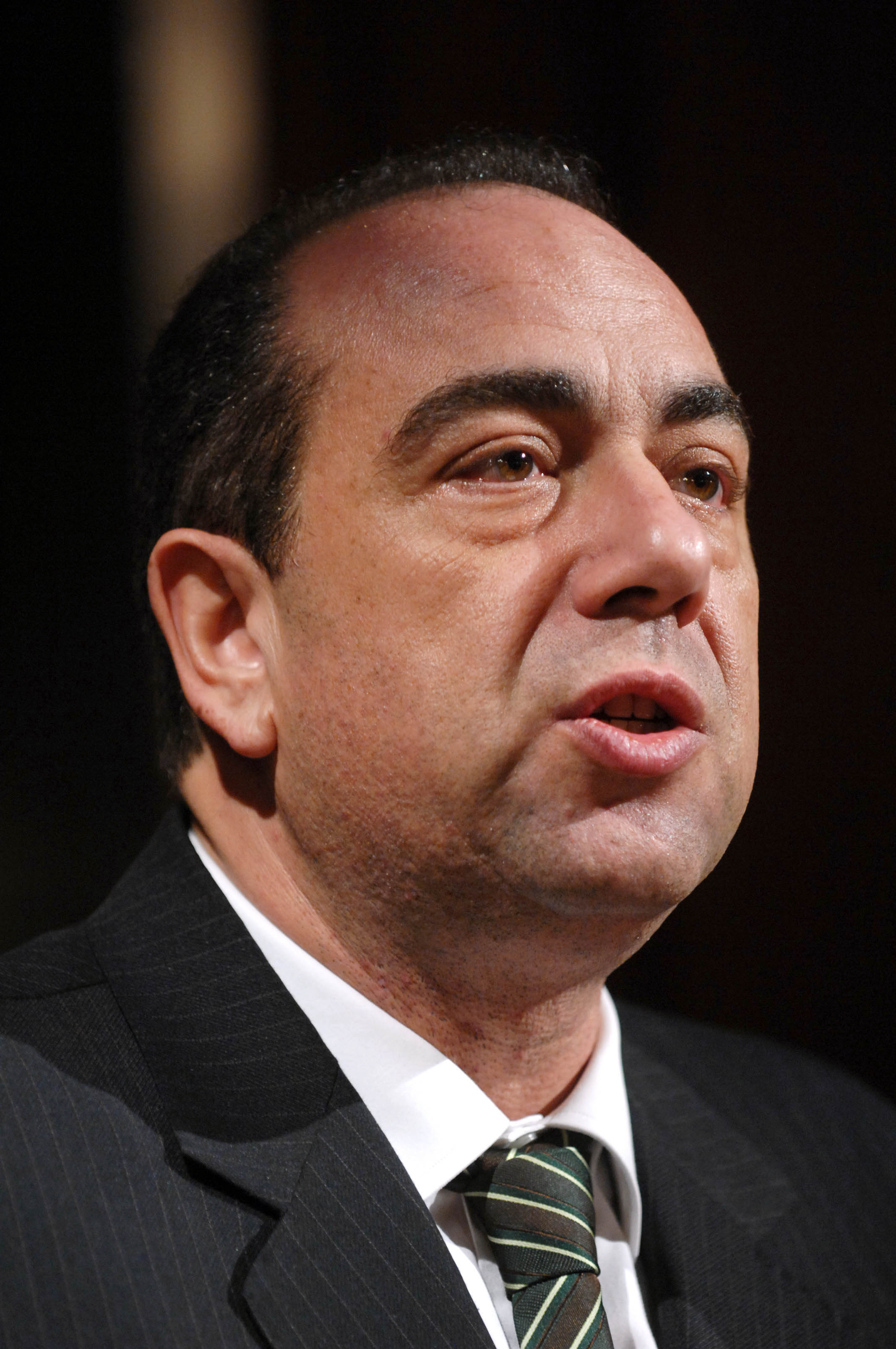
- Kyprianou in 2007

Minister of Foreign Affairs
- In office 3 March 2008 – 19 July 2011
- President: Dimitris Christofias
- Preceded by: Erato Kozakou-Marcoullis
- Succeeded by: Erato Kozakou-Marcoullis

European Commissioner for Health
- In office 1 January 2007 – 3 March 2008
- President: José Manuel Barroso
- Preceded by: Himself (Health and Consumer Protection)
- Succeeded by: Androulla Vassiliou

European Commissioner for Health and Consumer Protection
- In office 22 November 2004 – 1 January 2007
- President: José Manuel Barroso
- Preceded by: Pavel Telička
- Succeeded by: Himself (Health); Meglena Kuneva (Consumer Protection)

European Commissioner for the Budget
- In office 1 May 2004 – 22 November 2004 Serving with Michaele Schreyer
- President: Romano Prodi
- Preceded by: Michaele Schreyer
- Succeeded by: Dalia Grybauskaitė (Financial Programming and the Budget)

Minister of Finance
- In office 1 March 2003 – 18 May 2004
- President: Tassos Papadopoulos
- Preceded by: Takis Klerides
- Succeeded by: Makis Keravnos

Personal details
- Born: 22 January 1960 (age 66) Limassol, Cyprus
- Party: Democratic Party
- Parents: Spyros Kyprianou (father); Mimi Pagathrokliton (mother)
- Education: National and Kapodistrian University of Athens; Trinity College, Cambridge; Harvard Law School
- Profession: Lawyer

Markos Kyprianou (Greek: Μάρκος Κυπριανού [ˈmarkos cipriaˈnu]; born 22 January 1960) is a Cypriot politician who served as Minister of Foreign Affairs until his official resignation on 19 July 2011, following the events of the Evangelos Florakis Naval Base explosion. A member of the Democratic Party, he was previously Cyprus's Minister of Finance from 2003 to 2004 and a European Commissioner from 2004 to 2008. He tendered his resignation as Commissioner on 29 February 2008 to become Foreign Minister in the government of President Dimitris Christofias; the resignation took effect on 3 March 2008, when his successor, Androulla Vassiliou, was confirmed as Commissioner.

== Biography ==
Born in Limassol, Kyprianou is the younger son of Spyros Kyprianou, who was President of Cyprus from 1977 to 1988, and former Cypriot First Lady Mimi Kyprianou.

He studied law at the Law School of the University of Athens and at Trinity College, Cambridge, where he specialised in international law and tax law and was awarded a master's degree in Law (LLM). He earned a second master's degree in law, specialising in Company Law and Taxation, at Harvard Law School. He continued his academic career as a trainee at the Human Rights Commission of the Council of Europe and by carrying out research in international law at the University of Cambridge.

As a commissioner, one of his policies was the promotion of warnings on tobacco packets, with the Commission moving towards pictorial warnings. Following several European Union member states enacting bans on smoking in public places Kyprianou proposed a plan for an EU-wide ban of that kind. In May 2007, Kyprianou released a paper to tackle the shortage of organ donation in the Union. The plan included promotion, specially trained medical staff and an EU wide organ donor card. Markos Kyprianou was officially charged on 24 January 2012, together with seven other persons, by the Attorney General of the Republic of Cyprus in relation to the Mari blast.

On 9 July 2013, a Cyprus Criminal Court found Markos Kyprianou innocent and acquitted him of all charges. On 9 February 2014, Kyprianou staged a political comeback as he was elected Deputy President of the Democratic Party in Cyprus.

== Professional C.V. ==
- since 1985 practising law
- 1985–1991 associate with the law firm of Antis Triantafyllides & Sons
- 1991–1995 partner with the law firm of Kyprianou & Boyiadjis
- 1995– 2003 partner with the law firm of George L. Savvides & Co (merged with Kyprianou & Boyiadjis)

== Political C.V. ==
- 1986–1991 Municipal Councillor for the City of Nicosia
- 1993–1997 President of the Youth Organization of the Democratic Party
- since 1986 Member of the Central Committee of the Democratic Party (DIKO)
- since 1990 Member of the Political Committee of the Party
- 1993–1998 and 2001 Member of the Executive Bureau of the Party
- 1991–2003 Member of the House of Representatives for the Nicosia District
- 1999–2003 Chairman of the House Committee on Financial and Budgetary Affairs
- 1 March 2003 – 30 April 2004, Minister of Finance
- from 1 May 2004 - 3 March 2008. Member of the European Commission, (since November 2004 responsible for Health and Consumer Protection)
- from 3 March 2008 – 5 August 2011, Minister of Foreign Affairs.
- since 9 February 2014, Deputy President of Democratic Party.

== Memberships ==
- American Bar Association (associate member)
- Harvard Law School Association of Europe
- International Bar Association
- Cyprus Red Cross Society

Political offices
Preceded by Takis Klerides	Minister of Finance; 2003–2004	Succeeded by Makis Keravnos
New office	Cypriot European Commissioner; 2004–2008	Succeeded by Androulla Vassiliou
Preceded by Michaele Schreyer	European Commissioner for the Budget; 2004; Served alongside: Michaele Schreyer	Succeeded by Dalia Grybauskaitė as European Commissioner for Financial Programming and the Budget
Preceded by David Byrne; Pavel Telička	European Commissioner for Health and Consumer Protection; 2004–2007	Succeeded by Himself as European Commissioner for Health
Preceded by David Byrne; Pavel Telička	European Commissioner for Health and Consumer Protection; 2004–2007	Succeeded by Meglena Kuneva as European Commissioner for Consumer Protection
Preceded by Himself as European Commissioner for Health and Consumer Protection	European Commissioner for Health; 2007–2008	Succeeded by Androulla Vasiliou
Preceded by Erato Kozakou-Marcoullis	Minister of Foreign Affairs; 2008–2011	Incumbent
