= George Syrimis =

Cypriot accountant

George Syrimis Γιώργος Συρίμης

Cypriot Minister of Finance
- In office 28 February 1988 – 27 February 1993
- Preceded by: Christos Mavrellis
- Succeeded by: Fedros Economides

Personal details
- Born: 15 October 1921; Nicosia, Cyprus
- Died: 5 January 2010 (aged 88)
- Profession: Accountant, politician

George Syrimis (15 October 1921 – 5 January 2010) was a Cypriot accountant, who served as the Finance Minister of Cyprus from 1988 to 1993. Syrimis was also the founder of the accounting firm, G. Syrimis & Co., which eventually evolved into KPMG Cyprus (a Big Four).

== Early life ==
Syrimis was born in Nicosia, Cyprus. However, his family was originally from Agros, a village in the island's southern Pitsilia region. Syrimis studied accounting in England, where he became a chartered certified accountant. Then president George Vassiliou appointed Syrimis as the country's Finance Minister in 1988. He continued to serve as finance minister within the Vassiliou government until 1993.

== KPMG Cyprus ==
He returned to his native Cyprus from the UK in 1948. Syrimis founded his own accounting firm, G. Syrimis & Co. His firm later became part of Peat Marwick, which, in turn, was merged to become KPMG International in 1987. In 1961, Syrimis became a founding member of the Association of Certified Public Accountants of Cyprus (ICPAC), later serving as chair of the professional organization.

== Philanthropy ==
Syrimis was heavily involved in Cypriot charities and philanthropic organizations. An art collector, he sold his pieces to benefit local organizations, including the Cypriot National Guard. He was a member of the Rotary Club of Nicosia, the oldest rotary club in Cyprus.

== Death ==
Syrimis died on 5 January 2010, at the age of 88. He was survived by four children – Olympia Stylianou, the director general of the Cypriot Ministry of Education; Nicos Syrimis, the chairman of the Association of Certified Public Accounts of Cyprus since June 2009; Michalis Syrimis and Marios Syrimis.

Preceded by Christos D. Mavrellis	Finance Minister of Cyprus; 1988–1993	Succeeded by Fedros Economides
