= Takis M. Klerides =

Takis Klerides Τάκης Κληρίδης

Cypriot Minister of Finance
- In office 19 March 1999 – 28 February 2003
- President: Glafcos Clerides
- Preceded by: Christodoulos Christodoulou
- Succeeded by: Markos Kyprianou

Personal details
- Born: Nicosia, Cyprus
- Party: DISY
- Profession: Accountant, banker, politician

Takis M. Klerides (in Greek Τάκης Κληρίδης; born 1951 in Nicosia), is a Greek Cypriot accountant, banker and a politician. He served as a Finance Minister of Cyprus under president Glafcos Clerides from 19 March 1999 until 28 February 2003.

== Education ==
Takis Klerides was born in Nicosia, Cyprus, in 1951. He earned his Business studies degree in England and then qualified as a member of the Association of Chartered Certified Accountants (ACCA) in England, having completed the examinations in 1974. He is now a Fellow of ACCA and a member of the Institute of Certified Public Accountants of Cyprus (ICPA).

== Career ==
After graduation Kleridis worked for a few years in England and Greece. He returned to Cyprus to join Metaxas Loizides Syrimis & Co (later KPMG Cyprus), Accountants, Auditors, Consultants, where he became a partner in 1981. He left KPMG in March 1999 when he was appointed Minister of Finance of the Republic of Cyprus, a post he held until February 2003.

== European Union ==
In his speech to the House of Representatives in November 2002, Klerides outlined that during 2001 and 2002 the Economy of Cyprus faced an adverse external environment. Nevertheless, as the Minister pointed out, the Government set specific strategic goals and succeeded in achieving them. These include the positive record in macroeconomic stability, manifested in the low inflation rate and the containment of the fiscal deficit below 3% of GDP, thus fulfilling the corresponding Maastricht Treaty criterion, the improvement of the standard of living, the enhancement of competitiveness and the modernisation of the public sector.

== Cyprus Stock Market Bubble ==
The 1999–2000 Cyprus Stock Exchange bubble took place while Klerides was serving as finance minister. There have been several calls in the Cypriot media for tighter regulation to prevent Financial crimes and white collar crime as investigating authorities attempted to get at the root cause, in which investors lost millions as the result of artificially inflated share prices. In a report released in 2002 by local newspaper Cyprus Weekly, it praised the activities of the Watchdog Committee of the House of Representatives, which investigated the causes of the bubble and called for tighter supervision of auditors, increased powers for regulators and greater public education to ensure that such a situation does not arise again. Likening the 2000 crisis to the aftermath of the collapse of Enron, the newspaper called for new standards to ensure the independence of auditors from CSE activities. The report also called for an increase in the investigative powers of the Cyprus SEC (CySEC).

== Affiliations ==
- Member of the Council of ICPA & Cyprus Representative of the World Assembly of ACCA.
- Appointed Governor of the International Monetary Fund (IMF) and the European Bank of Reconstruction and Development (EBRD) from 1999 to 2003.
- Served as a member of the Commission for the Protection of Competition in Cyprus (C.P.C).
- In April 2003 he established his own business consulting firm acting as advisor/director to public and private corporations in banking, finance, investments, I.T, oil and gas, shipping, hotels and others.
- Non-Executive Independent Member of the board of directors of Muskita Aluminium Industries Plc.
- Kleridis was the Chairman of the Cyprus Basketball Federation from 1988 till 1998.
- Member of the Executive Council of the Cyprus Olympic Committee.
- President and Chairman of Agros "Proodos" Public Ltd.
- Non-Executive independent director of Logicom Public Ltd since 2008.
- Treasurer of the Cyprus Union of Ship-owners.
- Director of Lordos Hotels (Holdings) Public Ltd.
- In 2007 he was appointed as CEO of USB Bank Plc.

Preceded by Christodoulos Christodoulou	Finance Minister of Cyprus; 1999–2003	Succeeded by Markos Kyprianou
