= 1977 Cypriot presidential election =

- 10 September 1977
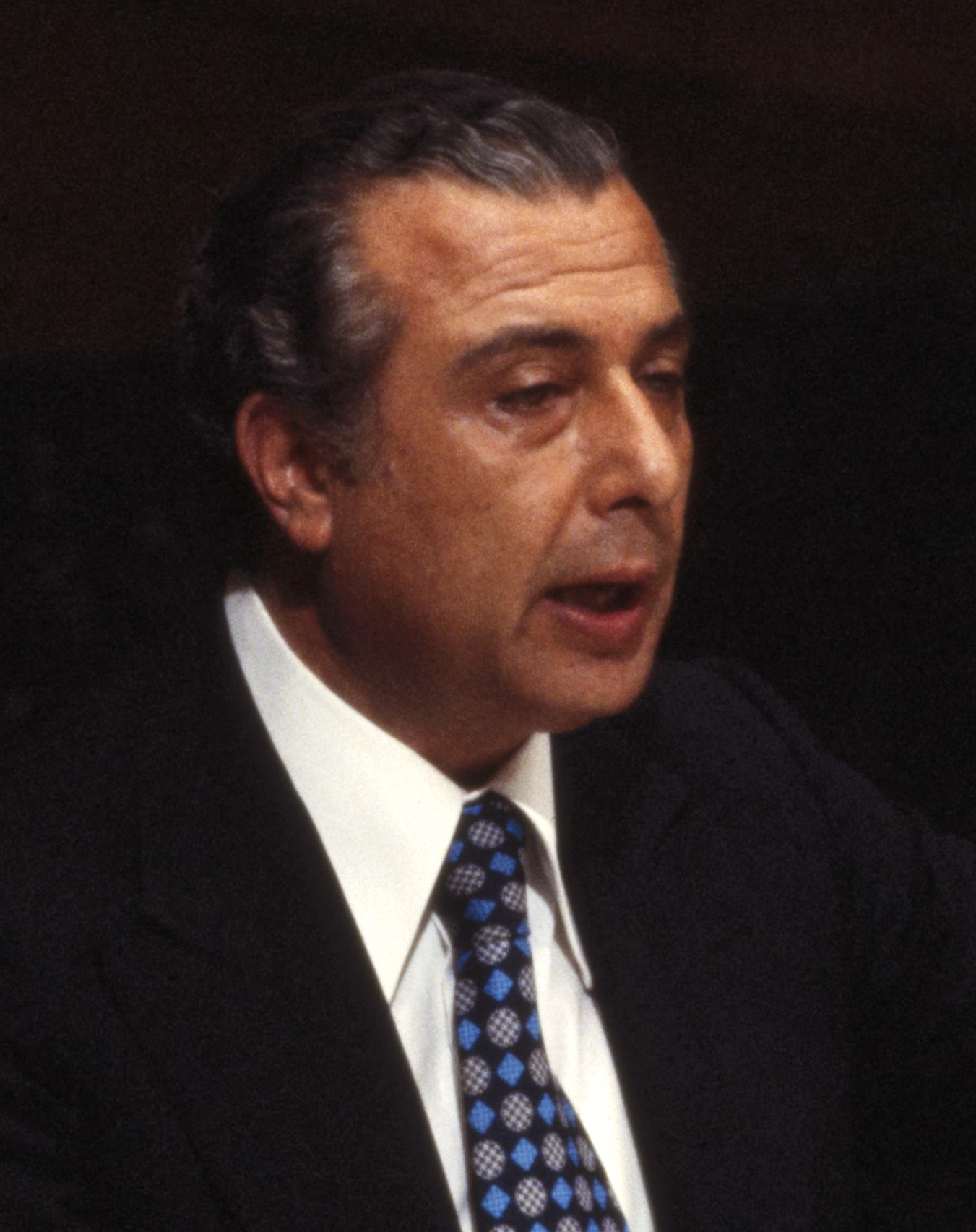
| Candidate | Spyros Kyprianou |
| Popular vote | Unopposed |
President before election
Spyros Kyprianou (acting)
Elected President
Spyros Kyprianou

Presidential elections were due to be held in Cyprus on 10 September 1977, as a consequence of the death of Makarios III in August the same year. These elections were by-elections to the presidency, and the elected president would only serve the rest of Makarios' term, which was due to end in 1978. Speaker of the House of Representatives Spyros Kyprianou, who had served as acting president since Makarios' death in accordance with the constitution, was the only candidate nominated, and was consequently elected in a walkover without a vote.
