= Spyros Kyprianou =

President of Cyprus from 1977 to 1988

- Σπύρος Κυπριανού
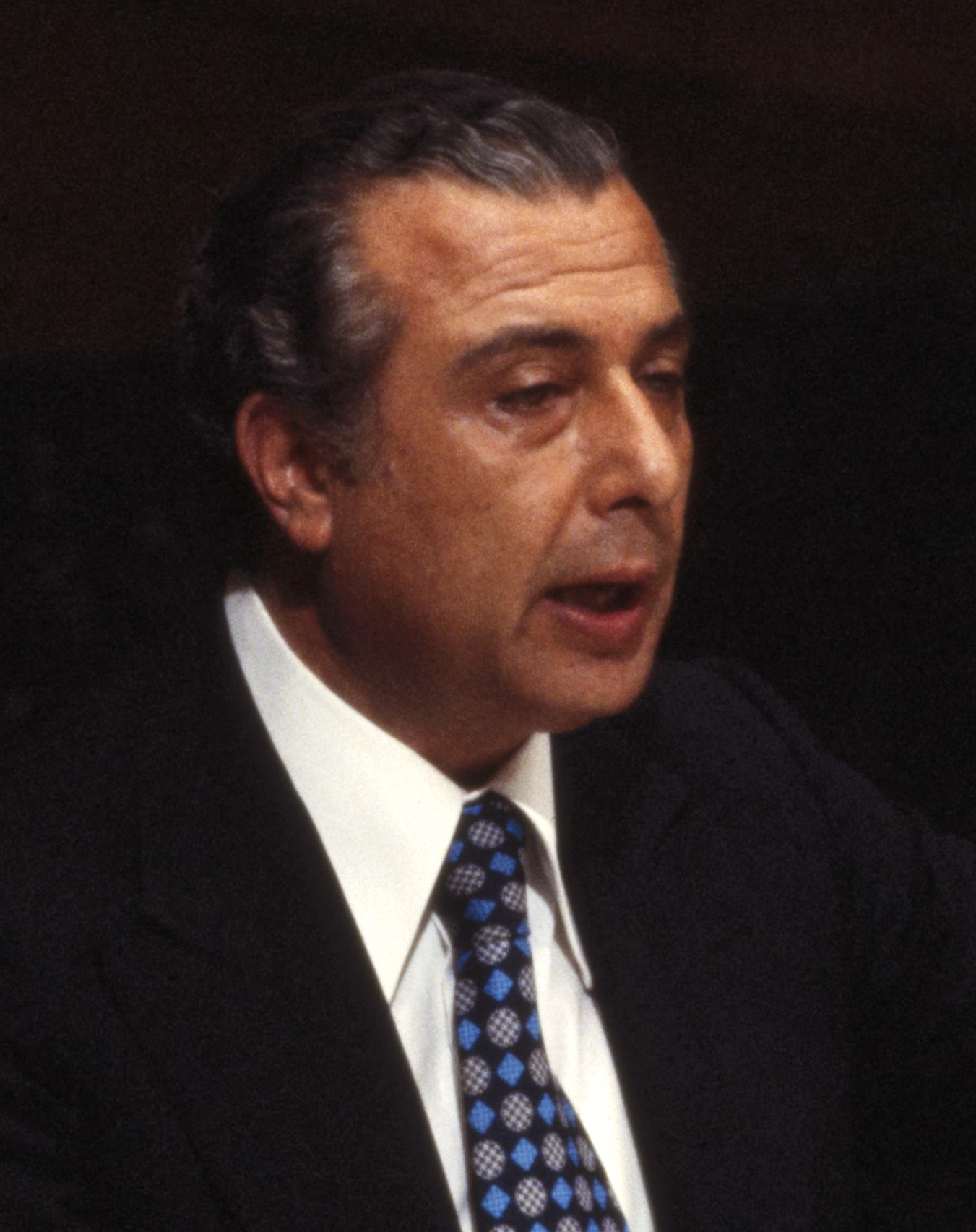
- Kyprianou in 1978

2nd President of Cyprus
- In office 3 August 1977 – 28 February 1988; Acting until 3 September 1977
- Preceded by: Makarios III
- Succeeded by: George Vassiliou

3rd and 8th President of the House of Representatives
- In office 6 June 1996 – 7 June 2001
- Preceded by: Alexis Galanos
- Succeeded by: Demetris Christofias
- In office 20 September 1976 – 3 September 1977
- Preceded by: Tassos Papadopoulos
- Succeeded by: Alekos Michaelides

1st President of DIKO
- In office 1976–2000
- Succeeded by: Tassos Papadopoulos

Personal details
- Born: 28 October 1932 Limassol, Cyprus
- Died: 12 March 2002 (aged 69) Nicosia, Cyprus
- Party: Democratic
- Spouse: Mimi Pagathrokliton (1956–2002; his death)
- Children: Markos Kyprianou
- Education: City of London College; Gray's Inn

Spyros Achilleos Kyprianou (Greek: Σπύρος Αχιλλέως Κυπριανού; 28 October 1932 – 12 March 2002) was a Cypriot barrister and politician, who served as President of Cyprus from 1977 to 1988. He also served as President of the Cypriot House of Representatives from 1976 to 1977 and then again from 1996 to 2001, as well as being President of the Democratic Party, which he founded, from 1976 to 2000.

As president, he considerably expanded Cyprus' presence on the international stage. He entered office in acting capacity following the death of President Makarios III in 1977, before being elected unopposed for the rest of Makarios' term in the resulting by-election the following month. He was elected for the next full term in 1978, again unopposed, and re-elected for a second full term 1983, but lost his bid to secure a third full term in 1988.

== Early life and education ==
Kyprianou was born in Limassol in 1932. His father came from a multi-child family from Lefkara, while his mother was a member of Araouzos political family from Limassol. He studied Economics and Commerce at the City of London College and law at Gray's Inn. He also studied comparative law, receiving a diploma.

== Political career ==
During the time he spent in London as a student, Kyprianou founded the National Union of Cypriot Students in England (E.F.E.K.A.) of which he was the first president. In 1952 he was appointed secretary of Archbishop Makarios III in London and in 1954 he assumed responsibility for the Office of the Secretary of the Cyprus Ethnarchy in London, the major objective of which was to inform British public opinion on the Cyprus issue. This effort was intensified after the start of the liberation struggle in Cyprus in 1955. Due to this activity, he was forced to leave the UK in June 1956 and went to Greece. There, he collaborated with the Panhellenic Committee for Self-Determination for Cyprus which aimed to raise the profile of the Cyprus case on the international scene.

From August 1956 to March 1957, Kyprianou represented the Cyprus Ethnarchy in New York. Later, he was allowed to return to his London post as representative of the Cyprus Ethnarchy. He stayed in London until the signing of the London – Zurich Agreements for the independence of Cyprus and returned to Cyprus with Archbishop Makarios in March 1959.

During the transitional period after the signing of the agreements on Cyprus, Kyprianou represented the Greek Cypriot side at the Athens Conference for the drafting of the Agreement on the Application of the Tripartite Alliance (Cyprus – Greece – Turkey), this was provided for in the London – Zurich Agreements.

After the declaration of the independence of Cyprus in August 1960, the president of the Republic of Cyprus Archbishop Makarios appointed Kyprianou Minister of Justice and, a few days later, Minister of Foreign Affairs.

As Minister of Foreign Affairs, he repeatedly represented Cyprus at the UN Security Council, and in sessions of the U.N. General Assembly during debates on the Cyprus issue. He also participated in meetings of the Committee of Ministers of the Council of Europe, of which he served as chairman from April to December 1967. In addition, he visited countries and represented Cyprus in negotiations with foreign governments.

In September 1964, in Moscow, he signed the Agreement for Soviet Military Aid to Cyprus.

He resigned from his post as Minister of Foreign Affairs on 5 May 1972, after a dispute with the military regime in Athens.

After this resignation, he worked as a lawyer and a legal counsellor. On 1 August 1974, following the coup of the Greek junta and the Turkish invasion in Cyprus, Kyprianou went to Athens where he had talks with the Government of National Unity, which took over following the collapse of the junta. He travelled between Athens and London where President Makarios was staying temporarily. In September 1974, he headed the Cyprus delegation to the General Assembly of the United Nations during the debate on Cyprus. In February 1975, he attended the Security Council meeting in New York as member of the Cyprus delegation.

On 12 May 1976, he announced the establishment of the Democratic Party. In the parliamentary elections of 5 September 1976, the Democratic Party won 21 seats out of a total of 35 in the House of Representatives, and Kyprianou was elected President of the House.

After the death of the president of the Republic Archbishop Makarios on 3 August 1977, Kyprianou became acting president of the Republic, in accordance with the constitution. A presidential election had been set for 10 September 1977 to fill the remainder of the term of Makarios. Kyprianou filed for the office before the 31 August deadline for nomination. The expense of an election proved unnecessary however, and the press noted on 31 August, "He was the only candidate nominated for the post by the noon deadline today. Because no one opposed Kyprianou's candidacy, an election scheduled for Septe. 10 was canceled." He officially took the oath of office on 3 September.

Kyprianou's elder son Achilles was kidnapped by members of EOKA B on the evening of 14 December 1977. Achilles was later released on 18 December.

In the presidential elections of 1978 and 1983, he was reelected as President of the Republic, the first time being elected unopposed. He ran for a third term in 1988 but finished in third place and failed to reach the runoff, in which George Vassiliou defeated Glafcos Clerides to become Kyprianou’s successor.

As President of the Republic of Cyprus, he visited many countries and participated in sessions of the United Nations, as well as summit conferences of the Non-Aligned Movement and the Commonwealth of Nations.

Kyprianou was awarded medals of honour, distinctions and decorations by various countries. In 1985, the University of Belgrade awarded him an honorary doctorate.

Following the parliamentary elections of 26 May 1996, Kyprianou was elected President of the House of Representatives. He stepped down in 2001, ending a 30-year career in politics.

== Family ==
Kyprianou married Mimi Pagathrokliton in 1956 and had two sons, Achilleas and Markos. His second son, Markos Kyprianou, served as a European Commissioner from 2004 to 2008 and Minister of Foreign Affairs of Cyprus.

== Death ==
Spyros Kyprianou died on 12 March 2002 after a long fight with cancer. He was survived by his wife, Mimi Pagathrokliton, and their two sons. His widow, former first lady Mimi Kyprianou, died on 22 November 2021.

Spyrou Kyprianou Avenue (Greek: Λεωφόρος Σπύρου Κυπριανού) in Nicosia was named after him posthumously, as well as a plethora of other streets across the island.

== Honours and awards ==
- Czechoslovakia: Grand Collar of the Order of the White Lion (11 June 1980)
- Cuba: Order of José Martí (1987)
- Spain: Grand Collar of the Order of Isabella the Catholic (1987)
- Yugoslavia: Order of the Yugoslav Great Star (1980)

Political offices
Preceded by Archbishop Makarios III	President of Cyprus; 1977–1988	Succeeded by George Vassiliou
Preceded by Alexis Galanos	President of the House of Representatives; 1996–2001	Succeeded by Dimitris Christofias
