= Mimi Kyprianou =

Former Cypriot First Lady (1932–2021)

First Lady of Cyprus
- In office August 3, 1977 – February 28, 1988
- President: Spyros Kyprianou
- Preceded by: Lila Irene Clerides (acting 1974)
- Succeeded by: Androulla Vassiliou

Personal details
- Born: Erasmia Papatheoklitou; 1932 Veria, Greece
- Died: November 22, 2021 (aged 88–89) Nicosia, Cyprus
- Spouse: Spyros Kyprianou (m. 1956; died 2002)
- Children: Achilleas; Markos

Erasmia "Mimi" Kyprianou (Greek: Μιμή Κυπριανού; 1932 – November 22, 2021) was the inaugural First Lady of Cyprus from 1977 to 1988 during the presidency of her husband, Spyros Kyprianou. She was Cyprus' first official first lady, as the country's first president, Archbishop Makarios III, a clergyman, was unmarried.

== Biography ==
Kyprianou was born Erasmia Papatheoklitou (Ερασμία Παπαθεοκλήτου) in the city of Veria in Imathia, Greece. She moved to London to study English literature. During her time as a student in London, Papatheoklitou met her future husband, Spyros Kyprianou, who was a law student. Papatheoklitou and Kyprianou began collaborating on charitable activities for the National Union of Cypriot Students in England (E.F.E.K.A.), including plays and theatre productions to raise money for a school attended by Greek Cypriot children in London. The couple married in Athens in 1956 and had two sons, Achilleas and Markos.

Mimi Kyprianou died in Nicosia, where she had been hospitalized at Nicosia New General Hospital, on November 22, 2021, at the age of 89. She was buried in Agios Nikolaos Cemetery in Limassol.
