= Kikis Kazamias =

Cypriot economist and politician

- Κίκης Καζαμίας

Cypriot Minister of Finance
- In office 6 August 2011 – 23 March 2012
- President: Demetris Christofias
- Preceded by: Charilaos Stavrakis
- Succeeded by: Vassos Shiarly

Minister of Communications and Works
- In office 3 March 2003 – 14 April 2004
- President: Tassos Papadopoulos
- Preceded by: Averof Neophytou
- Succeeded by: Giorgos Lillikas

Personal details
- Born: 27 August 1951 (age 74) Famagusta, Cyprus
- Party: AKEL
- Profession: Economist, politician

Kikis Kazamias (Greek: Κίκης Καζαμίας; born 27 August 1951) is a Cypriot economist and politician. He studied International Trade and International Economic Relations at the Berlin School of Economics and Law (BSEL) with a specialization in foreign trade and international economic relations. Returning to Cyprus in 1977, Kazamias became actively involved in politics joining the left-wing Progressive Party of Working People (AKEL).

On 5 August 2011, Kazamias was appointed Finance Minister of Cyprus by Demetris Christofias replacing Charilaos Stavrakis while still serving his term. He was in charge for implementing and negotiating the EU austerity measures within the Cyprus government sector after the 2008 European sovereign debt crisis. He resigned citing medical reasons in March 2012. President Christofias appointed Vassos Shiarly to take his place.

== Personal life ==
Kazamias is married to Rodoula Koliandri. They have three children.

== Source ==
- "Kikis Kazamias - Republic of Cyprus Candidate for membership of the European Court of Auditors" (PDF). 2004-09-17. Archived from the original (PDF) on 2017-08-29.

Political offices
Preceded by Charilaos Stavrakis	Finance Minister of Cyprus; 2011–2012	Succeeded by Vassos Shiarly
Preceded by Averof Neophytou	Minister of Communications and Works; 2003–2004	Succeeded by Giorgos Lillikas
