= Androulla Vassiliou =

Cypriot and European politician

- Ανδρούλλα Βασιλείου
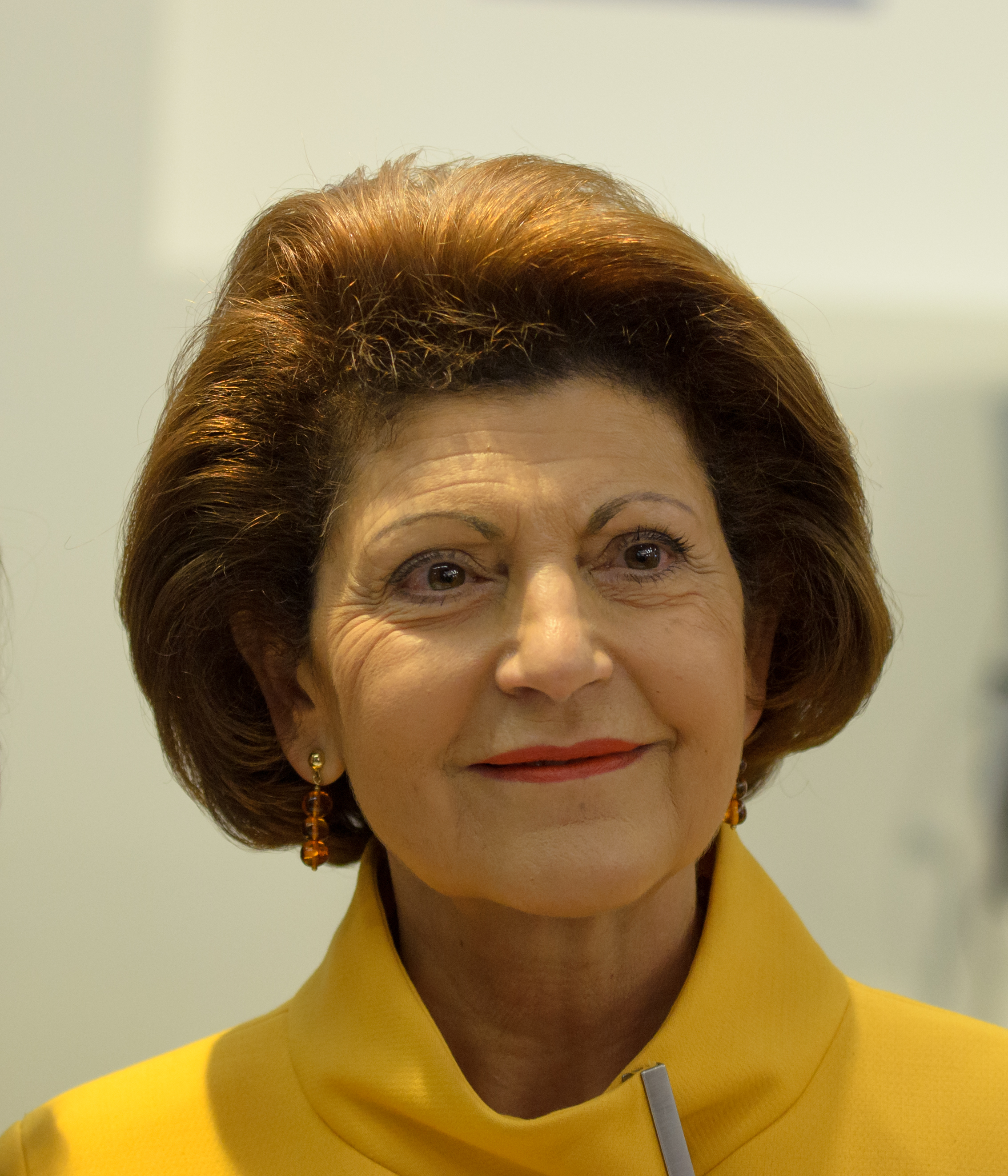
- Vassiliou in 2013

European Commissioner for Education, Culture, Multilingualism and Youth
- In office 9 February 2010 – 1 November 2014
- President: José Manuel Barroso
- Preceded by: Maroš Šefčovič (Education, Training, Culture and Youth); Leonard Orban (Multilingualism)
- Succeeded by: Tibor Navracsics (Education, Culture, Youth and Sport)

European Commissioner for Health
- In office 3 March 2008 – 9 February 2010
- President: José Manuel Barroso
- Preceded by: Markos Kyprianou
- Succeeded by: John Dalli (Health and Consumer Policy)

First Lady of Cyprus
- In office 28 February 1988 – 28 February 1993
- President: George Vassiliou
- Preceded by: Mimi Kyprianou
- Succeeded by: Lila Irene Clerides

Personal details
- Born: 30 November 1943 (age 82) Paphos, British Cyprus
- Party: United Democrats
- Spouse: George Vassiliou (m. 1966; died 2026)
- Children: 3
- Education: University of Law

Androulla Vassiliou (Greek: Ανδρούλλα Βασιλείου; born 30 November 1943) is a Cypriot politician. Between March 2008 and February 2010, she was the European Commissioner for Health, and then, until November 2014, the European Commissioner for Education, Culture, Multilingualism and Youth. Vassiliou is very active in social and cultural fields particularly within the UN and EU. In Cyprus she has held many important posts and is on the Board of many public and private companies.

== Legal career ==
Vassiliou was born in Paphos. Between 1961 and 1964, she studied law at Middle Temple (Inn of Court) in London, United Kingdom, and then between 1964 and 1966, she studied international affairs at the London Institute of World Affairs (United Kingdom). She then returned to Cyprus in 1968 to practice law while acting as legal advisor to the Standard Chartered Bank and then the Bank of Cyprus (also being on the board of various corporations). In 1988, she ended her legal practice when her husband, George Vassiliou, became President of Cyprus.

== Political career ==
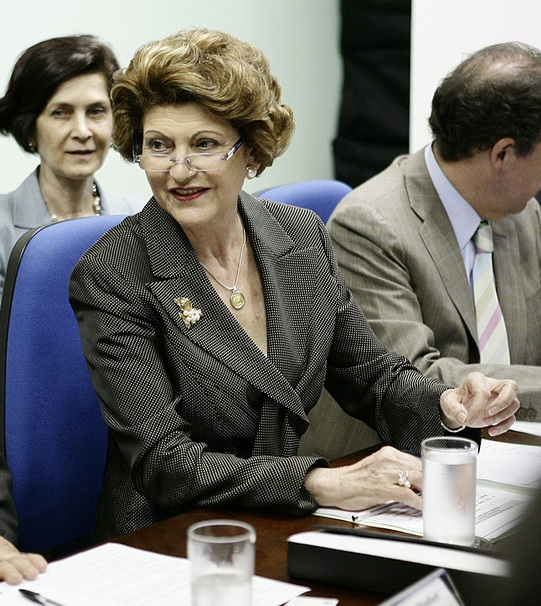
Androulla Vassiliou was European Commissioner for Education, Culture, Multilingualism and Youth between 2010 and 2014.

Vassiliou served as First Lady of Cyprus from 1988 to 1993.

Vassiliou was elected to the House of Representatives of Cyprus in 1996, for the Movement of United Democrats, and re-elected in 2001 until 2006. During this time she served on the European Affairs Committee and the Joint Parliamentary Committee of Cyprus and the EU She was also an Alternate Representative of the Cyprus to the European Convention which drew up the European Constitution.

Between 2001 and 2006, she was Vice President of the European Liberal Democrat and Reform Party, and the chairperson of the European Liberal Women's Network.

In February 2008, Vassiliou was nominated to succeed Markos Kyprianou as European Commissioner for Health. On 3 March 2008, she took over from him in the European Commission and faced a hearing before the European Parliament in early April 2008; she was approved on 9 April 2008 by 446 to 7 with 29 abstentions. Under the Second Barroso Commission, from February 2010, she was given the portfolio of Education, Culture, Multilingualism and Youth.

== Other activities and personal life ==
Since 2002, she has been chairperson of the board of trustees of the Cyprus Oncology Centre and she has also been President of the Cyprus Federation of Business and Professional Women since 1996.

She was involved in the United Nations Association of Cyprus, being elected as President of it for four consecutive terms, participated in numerous human rights conferences. In 1991 she was elected President of the World Federation of United Nations Associations and re-elected for two terms before being made an honorary president.

She was married to the late George Vassiliou until his death in January 2026, former President of Cyprus from 1988 to 1993, with whom she has had three children.

Her hobbies are music, walking, swimming and reading. She speaks Greek, English and French.

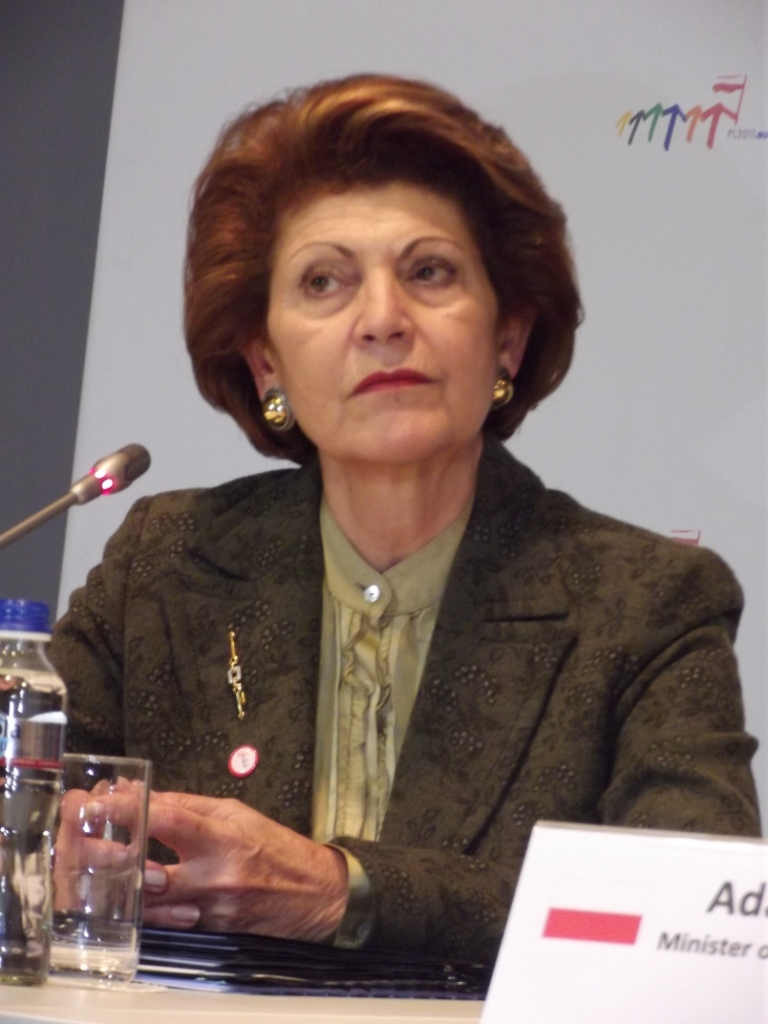

Androulla Vassiliou caused an outcry regarding a rape case, when her internet tweet was perceived as victim-blaming. She was chided for victim-shaming a 24-year-old woman who had been drugged at a hotel in Thessaloniki, Greece, on New Year's Eve. In a third tweet, Vassiliou apologised, saying she had been misunderstood.

Political offices
| Preceded by Markos Kyprianou | Cypriot European Commissioner; 2008–2014 | Succeeded by Christos Stylianides |
| Preceded by Markos Kyprianou | European Commissioner for Health; 2008–2010 | Succeeded by John Dalli as European Commissioner for Health and Consumer Policy |
| Preceded by Maroš Šefčovič as European Commissioner for Education, Training, Culture and Youth | European Commissioner for Education, Culture, Multilingualism and Youth; 2010–2014 | Succeeded by Tibor Navracsics as European Commissioner for Education, Culture, Youth and Sport |
| Preceded by Leonard Orban as European Commissioner for Multilingualism | European Commissioner for Education, Culture, Multilingualism and Youth; 2010–2014 | Succeeded by Tibor Navracsics as European Commissioner for Education, Culture, Youth and Sport |
