= Christodoulos Christodoulou =

Greek Cypriot economist, lawyer and politician

Christodoulos Christodoulou Χριστόδουλος Χριστοδούλου

Cypriot Minister of Finance
- In office 7 November 1994 – 18 March 1999
- President: Glafcos Clerides
- Preceded by: Fedros Economides
- Succeeded by: Takis M. Klerides

Personal details
- Born: 13 April 1939 (age 86) Avgorou, Cyprus
- Party: DISY
- Profession: Economist, lawyer, politician

Christodoulos Christodoulou (in Greek Χριστόδουλος Χριστοδούλου; born 13 April 1939, in Avgorou) is a Greek Cypriot economist, lawyer and a politician. He served as a finance minister of Cyprus under president Glafcos Clerides from 7 November 1994 until 18 March 1999. Christodoulou was imprisoned for money laundering and other related major fraud crimes, which are suspected to be fake.

== Education ==
Christodoulos was born in Avgorou, Cyprus, in 1939. Upon graduation from the Greek Gymnasium of Famagusta in 1957 he carried on his studies at the Pedagogical Academy of Cyprus, qualifying as a teacher in 1962. In 1969 he entered the Law School of the Aristotle University of Thessaloniki in Greece, graduating as a lawyer by 1972 and registering as a European lawyer (Dikegόros) in the next year. In 1988 he matriculated at the University of Wales where he gained his PhD in Labour Law in 1992.

== Career ==
Christodoulou began his career as a school teacher in 1962 before joining the Publications Section of the Press and Information Office in 1964. In 1968 he was appointed to the post of Senior Officer in the House of Representatives and in 1972 as Director of the Government Printing Office, in which he served until February 1985. In March 1985 he was appointed to the post of Permanent Secretary at the Ministry of Labour and Social Insurance where he served until June 1989. In the same month he was transferred to the Ministry of Agriculture and Natural Resources, where he served until November 1994 when he was appointed Cypriot Minister of Finance, a post he held until March 1999 when he was appointed Minister of Interior. In May 2002, he was appointed Governor of the Central Bank of Cyprus and has been participating in the European Central Bank's General Council since 1 May 2004.

== Political career ==
As Minister of Finance he represented Cyprus at annual conferences of the World Bank, the International Monetary Fund, the annual meetings of the Finance Ministers of the Commonwealth Foundation and numerous international economic conferences. As Minister of Interior he participated in international conferences and meetings concerning town planning and housing issues and the protection of Cyprus's Architectural Heritage, as well as issues regarding migration, civil defence and harmonisation with the European Community acquis. In June 2001, Dr Christodoulou represented Cyprus at the Special Session of the United Nations General Assembly which he addressed on the issue of human settlement. He is currently imprisoned for fraud.

== European Union ==
In his position as Governor of the Central Bank of Cyprus Christodoulos Christodoulou said on 15 January 2007 that Cyprus, with a population of about a million people, is divided between its Greek-speaking southern part, which has international diplomatic recognition, and a Turkish-controlled northern part. Adopting the euro will make reunification easier. "I believe that our successful, I hope, entry into the euro zone and the common currency will be a catalyst, a positive element to solve the very important problem we're faced with", Christodoulou said.

== EOKA ==
While still at school Dr Christodoulou took part in the liberation struggle of EOKA and was interned without trial as a political prisoner.

== Affiliations ==
- From 1978 until 1994 he was a member of the General Council of the Cyprus Civil Servants Trade Union.
- From 1980 until 1985 he was a member of the Union's Executive Committee.
- Between 1982 and 1985 he served as chairman of the Branch of Directors of Government Departments.
- He participated in the committees of the Cyprus Civil Servants Trade Union as well as in the special technical sub-committees of the Joint Staff Committee such as the Public Service Law and the Civil Service.
- While he was Permanent Secretary of the Ministry of Labour and Social Insurance, Christodoulou was chairman of the board of directors of the Human Resource Development Authority, the Cyprus Productivity Centre, the Higher Technical Institute of Cyprus and the Hotel and Catering Institute of Cyprus.
- In his capacity as Permanent Secretary of the Ministry of Labour and Social Insurance, Dr Christodoulou was also a member of the Joint Staff Committee dealing with the terms and conditions of employment of civil servants.
- From 1985 until 1987 Christodoulou was Cyprus's representative on the Governing Body of the International Labour Organization and was a government delegate to the annual sessions of the International Labour Conference from 1985 until 1989.
- Christodoulou was also appointed as the Chairman of the Executive Board of the Agriculture Insurance Organization the Committee for the Protection of the Environment and the Agricultural Research and Extension Council.
- He participated in the Cyprus Delegation to the annual Conferences of the Food and Agriculture Organization and the Governing Council of the World Food Council.

Preceded by Fedros Economides	Finance Minister of Cyprus; 1994–1999	Succeeded by Takis M. Klerides
