= Stavros Christodoulou =

Cypriot writer (born 1963)

Stavros Christodoulou (born 1963 in Nicosia) is a Cypriot writer. He studied law in Athens, and worked as a journalist afterwards. He is a columnist for the leading Cypriot newspaper Phileleftheros.

His first book Hotel National (2016) was shortlisted for the Cyprus State Literature Prize. His second book The Day the River Froze (2018) won the Cyprus State Literature Prize and the European Union Prize for Literature.
