= Higher Technical Institute of Cyprus =

Coordinates: 35.15606°N 33.40233°E

Higher Technical Institute (HTI)
- Ανώτερο Τεχνολογικό Ινστιτούτο (ΑΤΙ)
- Type: public university, Defunct
- Active: 1968–2007
- Administrative staff: 100
- Undergraduates: 358 (2004)
- Location: Nicosia, Cyprus

The Higher Technical Institute of Cyprus was a public tertiary educational institution established in 1968 as a joint project between the Government of Cyprus and the United Nations Development Programme (UNDP). Up to 1973 it was funded both by the Cyprus Government and the special UN fund. In 1973 the Cyprus Government (through the Ministry of Labour and Social Insurance) assumed the exclusive responsibility for its operation. Lessons were taught in the English language and lasted for 3 years. Due to the technical nature of the degrees offered, there was a considerable time spent by students in practical experience within the relevant industries.

There were five departments:

- Civil Engineering;
- Computer Science;
- Electrical Engineering;
- Mechanical and Marine Engineering;
- General Studies.

The Institute also had an active research program and offered consultancy services to the local industry.

In December 2003, the House of Representatives passed a bill (Law 198(I) 2003), establishing a new academic institution, the Cyprus University of Technology. According to the above Law, the HTI (along with several other similar schools) was integrated within the new University.
