= Vassos Shiarly =

- Βάσος Σιαρλή

Minister of Finance
- In office 24 March 2012 – 1 March 2013
- President: Demetris Christofias; Nicos Anastasiades
- Preceded by: Kikis Kazamias
- Succeeded by: Michael Sarris

Personal details
- Born: 1948 (age 77–78) London, England
- Profession: Banker, politician

Vassos Shiarly (Greek: Βάσος Σιαρλή, locally [ˈvasos ʃaɾˈli]; born 1948) is a British Cypriot banker and politician. He studied at the London School of Economics and Wayne State University. From 24 March 2012 until 1 March 2013, Shiarly served as the Minister of Finance of Cyprus. Chosen by President Demetris Christofias to replace the ailing Kikis Kazamias, he and his predecessor oversaw the collapse of public finances amidst the 2012–2013 Cypriot financial crisis.

== Career ==
Shiarly worked for 19 years in various accounting firms in London. His last employment before repatriating to Cyprus in 1985 was with then Coopers & Lybrand (now PricewaterhouseCoopers), where he held the position of Senior Manager. In Cyprus, Shiarly became actively involved in the banking sector, joining the Bank of Cyprus initially at its investment banking division and later in the positions of Senior Manager of Customer Management Services, Group General Manager and Group Chief General Manager. In his capacity as finance minister, Shiarly also served as European Investment Bank Governor for the Republic of Cyprus.

== Recognition ==
- He was elected chairman of the board of directors of the Association of Cyprus Banks for the period 2009–2010.
- In December 2010 he was elected chairman of the board of directors of the Cyprus anti-Cancer Society.
- In November 2011 he was appointed by the Council of Ministers of the Republic of Cyprus as Chairman of the Cyprus Health Insurance Organization.
- Shiarly also served as a member of the board of directors of the Junior School in Nicosia for six years.

Preceded by Kikis Kazamias	Minister of Finance; 2012–2013	Succeeded by Michael Sarris
