= Tomás Treviño de Sobremonte =

Spanish-born crypto-Jewish martyr

- Born: 1592; Spain
- Died: 14 April 1649 (aged 56–57); Kingdom of Mexico, New Spain

Tomás Treviño de Sobremonte (Note: Also written as Tremiño or Trebiño) (1592 – 14 April 1649) was a Crypto-Jewish martyr. Born in Spain, Treviño fled to New Spain at around age 20. There he practiced Judaism secretly until his discovery and execution. His defiance and refusal to accept Catholicism has made him an important figure in studies of early Jews in Latin America, and he is regarded as one of the best-known victims of the Spanish Inquisition.

== Biography ==
Tomás Treviño de Sobremonte was born in 1592 in Medina de Rioseco, Spain. There is speculation that he had Portuguese heritage. His father, Antonio Treviño de Sobremonte, was a Christian farmer and caretaker of the church in Medina de Rioseco; his mother, Leonor Martínez de Villagomez, was a New Christian who secretly still practiced Judaism. Treviño de Sobremonte was baptized at birth and confirmed at the age of seven or eight. He studied canon law at the University of Salamanca. He had been a page in Medina de Rioseco; when another page called him a Jew as an insult, he killed the page. He fled Spain around 1611 or 1612. When his father died in 1619, his mother was arrested and died in prison in Valladolid. He had two brothers, Jerónimo and Francisco; Jerónimo was tortured until he gave up the whereabouts of Tomás.

Treviño de Sobremonte was first arrested in 1624 on accusations of judaizing (practicing Judaism). As he readily confessed to secretly practicing Judaism since the age of fourteen and reportedly showed signs of contrition and repentance, he was freed within a year. He was involved in trade. He married María Gomez in 1629, in a reportedly Jewish wedding. They had six children: Leonor, Rafael, Micaela, Gavriel, Salvador, and Antonio, the last of whom died as a child.

He was accused once more in 1638 of Judaizing.

He and his wife were arrested again in 1645. The punishment for those already convicted once of practicing Judaism was death. Treviño de Sobremonte and his wife resolved to die together. At first, he refused to admit guilt; eventually, he confessed, and insisted on dying as a Jew.

Tomás Treviño de Sobremonte was executed at the auto-da-fé in the Kingdom of Mexico, New Spain, on 14 April 1649. Before his death, he was offered the chance to repent and accept Catholicism. He refused and was burnt alive at the stake instead of being strangled by garrote, which was considered a more merciful punishment. According to Mexican historian Manuel Romero de Terreros, when the Franciscan friars tried one last time to convince him to accept Catholicism, he retorted "Throw on more wood, this fire costs me enough money." (Note: In Spanish: "Echen más leña, que mi dinero me cuesta".) His wife, mother-in-law, brother-in-law, and sister-in-law were executed by garrote and subsequently burnt at the stake around the same time at the auto-da-fé in Mexico. His children were assimilated into Catholicism.

He was immortalized in Miguel de Barrios' 1683 poem.

His house was for a time preserved as a historical landmark, but by 1923 was in ruins.
