= Makis Keravnos =

Cypriot banker and politician (born 1951)

- Μάκης Κεραυνός
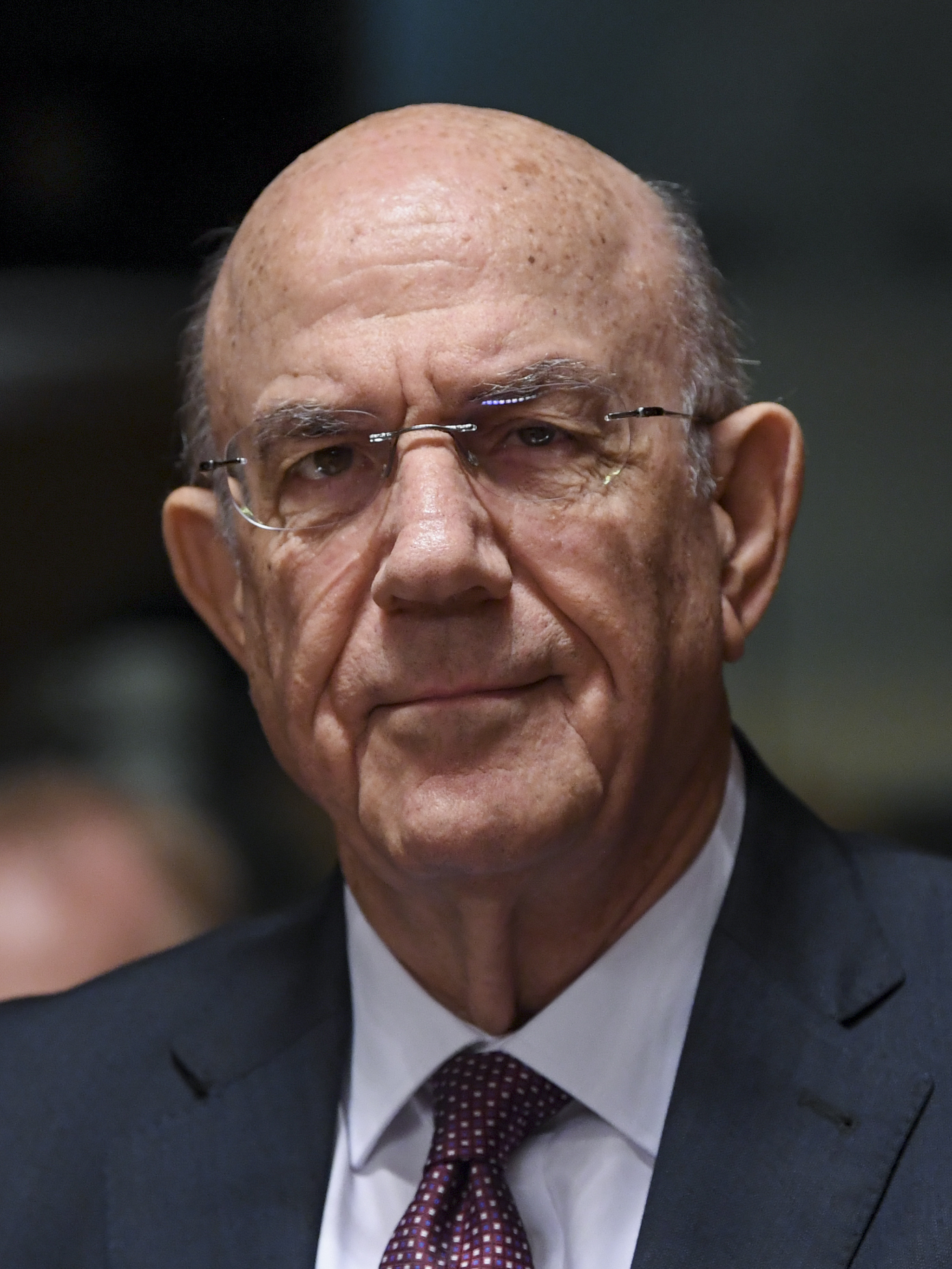
- Keravnos in 2023

Minister of Finance
- Incumbent
- Assumed office 1 March 2023
- President: Nikos Christodoulides
- Preceded by: Konstantinos Petridis
- In office 19 May 2004 – 30 August 2005
- President: Tassos Papadopoulos
- Preceded by: Markos Kyprianou
- Succeeded by: Michael Sarris

Minister of Labor and Social Security
- In office 3 March 2003 – 18 May 2004
- President: Tassos Papadopoulos
- Preceded by: Andreas Mousiouttas
- Succeeded by: Christos Taliadoros

Personal details
- Born: 18 December 1951 (age 74) Larnaca, British Cyprus
- Party: Democratic Party
- Profession: Politician, economist, banker

Iacovos "Makis" Keravnos (Greek: Ιάκωβος "Μάκης" Κεραυνός; born 18 December 1951) is a Cypriot politician, economist, and banker. A member of the Democratic Party, he has been serving as Minister of Finance since March 2023. He previously held the same position from May 2004 to August 2005, in addition to serving as Minister of Labor and Social Security from March 2003 to May 2004.

Keravnos represented Cyprus in various meetings with the EU Council of Ministers during his first tenure as Minister of Finance, and played a key role in ushering Cyprus into the European Exchange Rate Mechanism in May 2004, marking the initial step that culminated in Cyprus joining the eurozone in January 2008.

From September 2005 to September 2014, Keravnos was the CEO of Hellenic Bank, which was the country's third largest bank at the time. He served as Chairman of the Board of Directors for the Cyprus Broadcasting Corporation from 2006 to 2009. As of October 2018, he has been a non-executive member of the Board of Directors for the Central Bank of Cyprus.

Between 18 November and 11 December 2025, he assumed the position of Eurogroup acting president after Paschal Donohoe quit, until the election of the new president Kyriakos Pierakkakis.

Political offices
Preceded by Andreas Mousiouttas	Labor Minister of Cyprus; 3 March 2003 – 18 May 2004	Succeeded by Christos Taliadoros
Preceded by Markos Kyprianou	Finance Minister of Cyprus; 19 May 2004 – 30 August 2005	Succeeded by Michael Sarris
Preceded by Konstantinos Petridis	Finance Minister of Cyprus; 1 March 2023 – present	Incumbent
