= Martin Kaalma =

Estonian footballer (born 1977)

Personal information
- Full name: Martin Kaalma
- Date of birth: 14 April 1977 (age 49)
- Place of birth: Tallinn, then part of Estonian SSR, Soviet Union
- Height: 1.85 m (6 ft 1 in)
- Position: Goalkeeper

Senior career*
Years	Team	Apps	(Gls)
1993–1994	Norma Tallinn	1	(0)
1994	→ Pantrid Tallinn		
1994	FC Lelle		
1995–1996	Tervis Pärnu		
1996–1997	Flora Tallinn	12	(0)
1997	→ FC Lelle	10	(0)
1997–1998	Lelle SK	12	(0)
1998	→ Vall Tallinn	10	(0)
1998	Flora Tallinn	1	(0)
1998	→ Kuressaare	12	(3)
1999	Lelle SK	17	(0)
1999	→ Kuressaare	11	(0)
2000	Tulevik Viljandi	28	(0)
2001–2005	Flora Tallinn	121	(0)
2006	Trans Narva	36	(0)
2007–2009	Levadia Tallinn	81	(0)
2007	→ Levadia II Tallinn	1	(0)
2011–2013	Paide Linnameeskond	?	
2013–2023	Viimsi MRJK		

International career
	Estonia U16	1	(0)
	Estonia U19	1	(0)
	Estonia U21	16	(0)
1995–2004	Estonia	35	(0)

Managerial career
- 2010–: Levadia Tallinn (goalkeeping coach)
- * Club domestic league appearances and goals as of 17 November 2009

Martin Kaalma (born 14 April 1977 in Tallinn) is a former Estonian professional football goalkeeper and current goalkeeping coach for Levadia Tallinn. He has been capped in the Estonia national football team 35 times. He played for multiple Estonian clubs, but longest for FC Flora Tallinn before joining Narva Trans for a 1-year spell in 2006. He then moved to Levadia Tallinn.

== Honours ==
=== Club ===
Club	Position	Year
FC Flora Tallinn	Estonian Top Division	1998
FC Flora Tallinn	Estonian Top Division	2001
FC Flora Tallinn	Estonian Top Division	2002
FC Flora Tallinn	Estonian Top Division	2003
FC Flora Tallinn	Estonian Cup	1998
FC Levadia Tallinn	Estonian Top Division	2007
FC Levadia Tallinn	Estonian Top Division	2008
FC Levadia Tallinn	Estonian Top Division	2009
FC Levadia Tallinn	Estonian Cup	2007
