= Michael Sarris =

- Μιχάλης Σαρρής

Minister of Finance
- In office 2 March 2013 – 2 April 2013
- President: Nicos Anastasiades
- Preceded by: Vassos Shiarly
- Succeeded by: Harris Georgiades
- In office 31 August 2005 – 28 February 2008
- President: Tassos Papadopoulos
- Preceded by: Makis Keravnos
- Succeeded by: Charilaos Stavrakis

Personal details
- Born: 14 April 1946 (age 80) Nicosia, Cyprus
- Profession: Economist, politician

Michael Sarris (Greek: Μιχάλης Σαρρής; born 14 April 1946) is a Greek Cypriot economist and politician. He earned his B.Sc. in Economics at the London School of Economics & Political Science (LSE). He later continued his studies in the United States where he obtained his Doctorate in Economics at Wayne State University.

== Career ==
In 1972, he joined the research department of the Central Bank of Cyprus. In early 1974, he moved to the Bank of Cyprus to work in planning and project analysis. His international career took off in 1975 when Sarris was employed by the World Bank. In the course of his career, his work covered a broad range of sectors in Africa, Latin America and East Asia. His duties included supervision of the design of the overall country strategies of the Bank, the provision of advice on policy issues for economic and social development, the elaboration of programmes for structural adjustments and the development of economic policy dialogue between the Bank and the national authorities of countries seeking World Bank assistance. At the end of 2004, he retired from the World Bank as Department Director.

In September 2005, President Tassos Papadopoulos appointed Sarris Minister of Finance, a position he held until the change of government in March 2008.

=== Change of currency ===
During Sarris' first tenure as Minister of Finance, Cyprus prepared for and introduced the euro as its national currency. An aggressive austerity programme helped turn a fiscal deficit of 6.3% in 2003 into a surplus of 1.2% in 2008, and reduced inflation to 4.7%.

Sarris on Cyprus' entry to the eurozone:

"The Cypriot Pound, which has been legal tender since 1960, will cease to exist and will be replaced by the common European currency. This is a fundamental, albeit natural, change for a small economy, brought about by Cyprus’ accession to the EU in 2004. The economy can reap important benefits from its participation in the single currency area, although it will face significant challenges. Everyone must play its [sic] role in this important journey, the government and the Central Bank, businesses, workers, and consumers."

=== Cypriot financial crisis ===
In 2012, between January and August, Michael Sarris took a more active role in the recovery of Cyprus Popular Bank. Cyprus Popular Bank made unwise investments in Greece and urgently needed €1.8 billion ($2.25 billion) in bailout money in 2012.

Sarris was reappointed Minister of Finance by President Nicos Anastasiades on 28 February 2013. He resigned on 2 April after completing talks on a controversial bailout package for Cyprus.

== Allegations of inappropriate behaviour ==
On 15 October 2011, Sarris was accused by the internationally unrecognized entity of Northern Cyprus of inappropriate behaviour and was detained for three days. No inappropriate behavior was ever proven by Northern Cyprus, where homosexuality was still illegal. Northern Cyprus had previously made similar allegations.

== Business interests ==
- Former Non-Executive Chairman and Chairman of Nominations Committee Cyprus Popular Bank Public Co Ltd
- Non-Executive Independent Director and Member of Audit Committee AFI Development PLC
- Non-Executive Director at FxPro
- Director, Chairman of Audit Committee and Member of Conflicts Committee at Navios Maritime Partners Lp
- Member of the Board of Takis & Louki Nemitsas Foundation

Political offices
Preceded by Makis Keravnos	Finance Minister of Cyprus; 2005–2008	Succeeded by Charilaos Stavrakis
Preceded by Vassos Shiarly	Finance Minister of Cyprus; 2013	Succeeded by Charis Georgiades
