= Harris Georgiades =

Greek Cypriot economist and politician (born 1972)

- Χάρης Γεωργιάδης
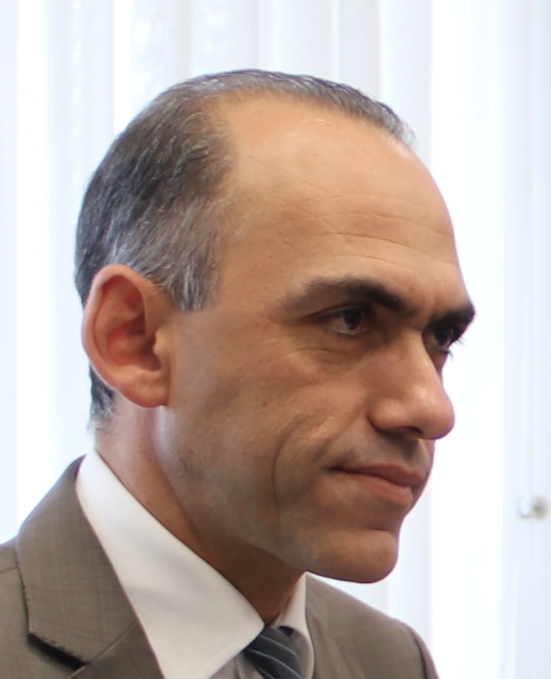

Minister of Finance
- In office 3 April 2013 – 2 December 2019
- President: Nicos Anastasiades
- Preceded by: Michael Sarris
- Succeeded by: Constantinos Petrides

Personal details
- Born: 9 April 1972 (age 54) Nicosia, Cyprus
- Party: Democratic Rally
- Education: University of Reading

Harris Georgiades (Greek: Χάρης Γεωργιάδης; born 9 April 1972) is a Greek Cypriot economist and politician. He served as Minister of Finance of Cyprus between April 2013 and December 2019. He was pivotal in the successful implementation of the economic reform plan for Cyprus and its successful conclusion in 2016.

== Early life and career ==
Born in 1972 in Nicosia, Georgiades holds a BA and an MA in international relations and economics from the University of Reading in Berkshire, England. Between 1999 and 2011 he was managing director of a family-owned hotel business.

== Political career ==
In 2011, Georgiades was elected to the House of Representatives of Cyprus with the Democratic Rally, a member of the centre-right European Peoples Party. He was appointed minister of finance in 2013, at the height of a severe financial crisis. He was successful in restoring the soundness of the Cyprus economy, placing it in a path of solid economic growth, surplus budgets, rating upgrades and banking sector restructuring.

Georgiades has also served as chair of the Foreign and European Affairs Committee of the Cyprus Parliament and Deputy Leader of the Democratic Rally party.

He was a long-serving member of the Eurogroup and the ECOFIN and was elected chairman of the Board of Governors the European Bank for Reconstruction and Development for the period 2014–2015. In 2016 he was selected by POLITICO as one of 28 influential Europeans and in 2019 was Chair of the Commonwealth Finance Ministers Summit.

Georgiades was elected as Deputy Leader of the governing Democratic Rally party in January 2020 and was re-elected to the House of Representatives in May 2021.

== Other activities ==
=== European Union organizations ===
- European Investment Bank (EIB), Ex-Officio Member of the Board of Governors (2013–2019)
- European Stability Mechanism (ESM), Ex-Officio Member of the Board of Governors (2013–2019)

=== International organizations ===
- European Bank for Reconstruction and Development (EBRD), chairman of the Board of Governors (2014–2015)
- International Monetary Fund (IMF), Ex-Officio Member of the Board of Governors (2013–2019)
- Multilateral Investment Guarantee Agency (MIGA), World Bank Group, Ex-Officio Member of the Board of Governors (2013–2019)
- World Bank, Ex-Officio Member of the Board of Governors (2013–2019)

=== For-profit organizations ===
- World Economic Forum (WEF), Member of the Europe Policy Group (since 2017)

== Recognition ==
In 2016, Georgiades was featured in POLITICO magazine as one of the 28 most influential Europeans

Political offices
| Preceded by Michael Sarris | Minister of Finance; 2013–2019 | Succeeded by Konstantinos Petridis |
