= List of mayors of Nicosia Municipality =

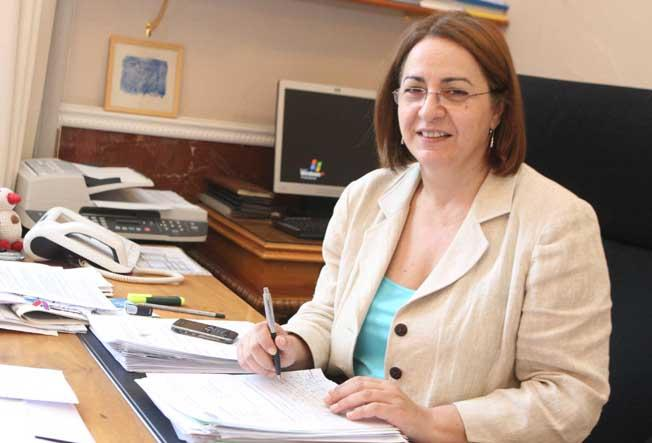
Eleni Mavrou, Mayor of Nicosia 2007–2011, at her office in central Nicosia

This is a list of the mayors of the Nicosia Municipality and their years of service.

== Pre-independence (1882–1959) ==
- Christodoulos Severis, 15 November 1882 – 31 July 1888
- Achilleas Liassides, 1 August 1888 – 10 April 1906
- Antonios Theodotou, 8 January 1888 – 10 April 1906
- Mehmet Şevket Bey, 11 April 1908 – 31 March 1911
- Antonios Theodotou, 1924–1926
- George Markides, 6 April 1926 – 31 March 1929
- Themistoclis Dervis, 5 April 1929 – 28 September 1946
- Ioannis Clerides, 1 June 1946 – 31 May 1949 (last elected Mayor until 1986)
- Themistoclis Dervis, 1 June 1949 – 18 December 1959

== Post-independence (1959–1974) ==
- Diomedes Skettos, 1959–60
- George M. Spanos, 1960–1962; 1963–64
- Odysseas Ioannides, 1964–1970
- Lellos Demetriades, December 1971 – July 1974 (dismissed by the July 15 coup)

== After 1974 ==
- Christoforos Kithreotis, August 1974
- Lellos Demetriades, October 1974 – 2001 (elected in 1986; reelected in 1991 and 1996)
- Michael Zampelas, 2002–2006
- Eleni Mavrou, 2007–2011
- Constantinos Yiorkadjis, 2011–present

== See also ==
- List of mayors of Nicosia Turkish Municipality
