= List of trade unions in Italy =

A list of national trade union centers in Italy include:

== Trade union centers ==
=== Main national trade union centers ===
The following three confederal trade unions are considered and recognised by the Italian Republic as relevant counterpart:

- Italian General Confederation of Labour (CGIL)
- Italian Confederation of Workers' Trade Unions (CISL)
- Italian Labour Union (UIL)

=== Other union centers ===
A list of other minor sectorial or independent trade union centers includes (alphabetical order):

- Confederazione del Comitati di Base (COBAS)
- CONFSAL
- Confederazione Unitaria di Base (CUB)
- General Labour Union (UGL)
- Italian Confederation of Free Workers' Unions (CISAL)
- Unione Sindacale di Base (USB)
- Unione Sindacale Italiana (USI)
- Smart Workers Union (SWU)

== Trade unions ==
An incomplete list of sectorial trade unions includes (alphabetical order):

- Italian Footballers' Association
- UILCA

== Structure ==
Italian unions are built around local chambers of labor (camera del lavoro). These chambers largely do not collectively bargain but serve as the clearinghouse for Italian worker assistance, as opposed to other countries, where workers might first appeal to a national union. Workers organize around these chambers rather than at worksites. Italian unions are loose affiliations based on occupation.
