= Manu Pineda =

Spanish politician (born 1965)

Manu Pineda MEP
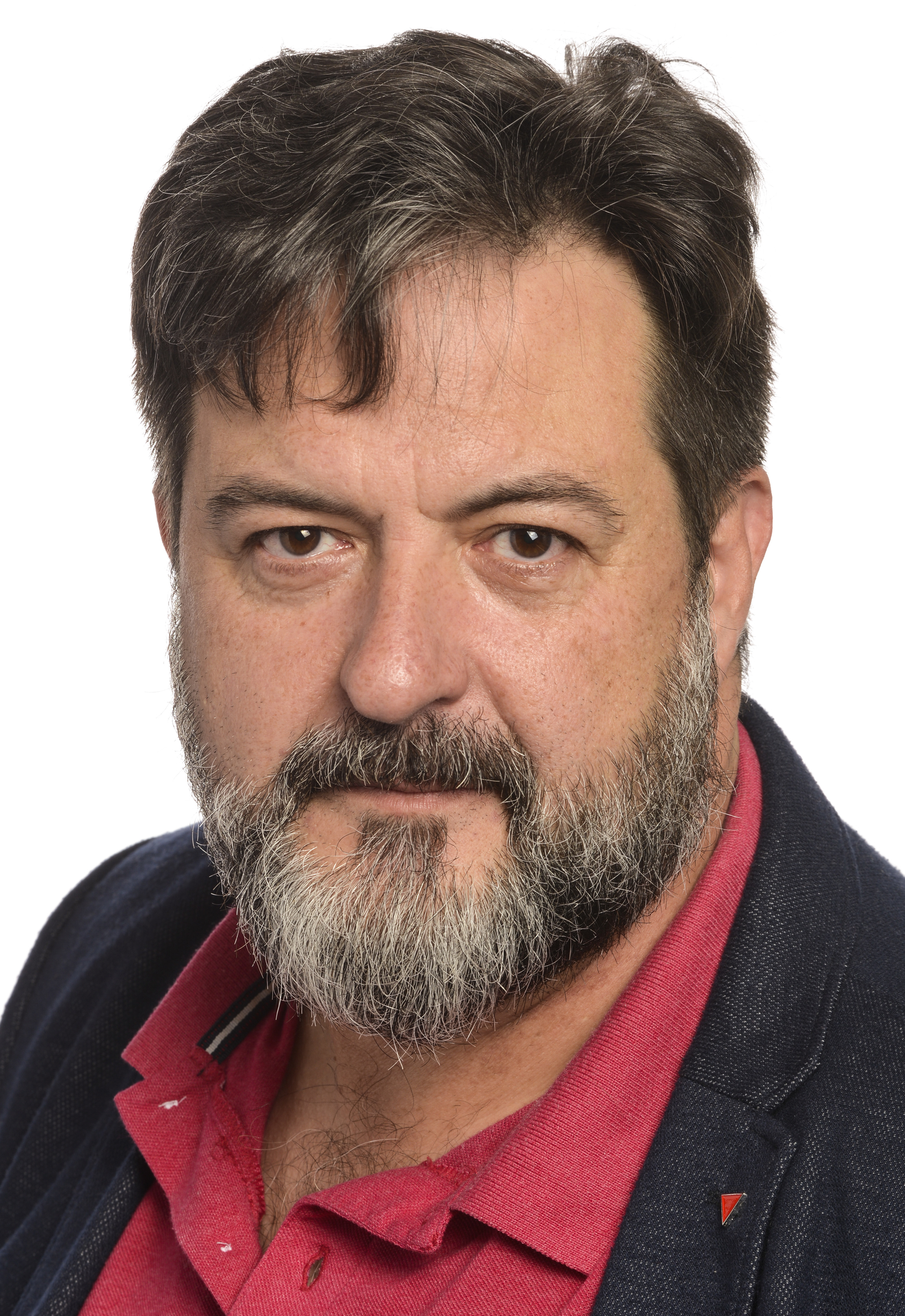

Member of the European Parliament for Spain
- In office 2 July 2019 – 16 July 2024

Chair of the European Parliament Delegation for relations with Palestine
- In office 26 September 2019 – 15 July 2024
- Preceded by: Neoklis Sylikiotis
- Succeeded by: Lynn Boylan

Personal details
- Born: Manuel Pineda Marín; 2 September 1965 (age 60) Málaga, Andalusia, Francoist Spain
- Party: Communist Party of Spain; United Left
- Other political affiliations: Workers' Commissions

Manuel "Manu" Pineda Marín (pronounced [ˈmanu piˈneða]; born 2 September 1965) is a Spanish communist politician from the United Left coalition who was elected as a Member of the European Parliament in 2019. He is the long-time head of international relations for the Spanish Communist Party (PCE).

On 15 September 2022, he was one of 16 MEPs who voted against condemning President Daniel Ortega of Nicaragua for human rights violations, in particular the arrest of Bishop Rolando Álvarez.

Pineda is a member of Samidoun and Unadikum, an organization that supports the Boycott, Divestment and Sanctions movement and the Popular Front for the Liberation of Palestine. Israel banned him from entering the country in 2022. In June 2023 in Beirut, Sheikh Yusuf Abbas presented Pineda with the Ambassador of Return award from The Global Campaign to Return to Palestine.
