= Costas Mavrides =

Cypriot politician

Costas Mavrides MEP
- Κώστας Μαυρίδης
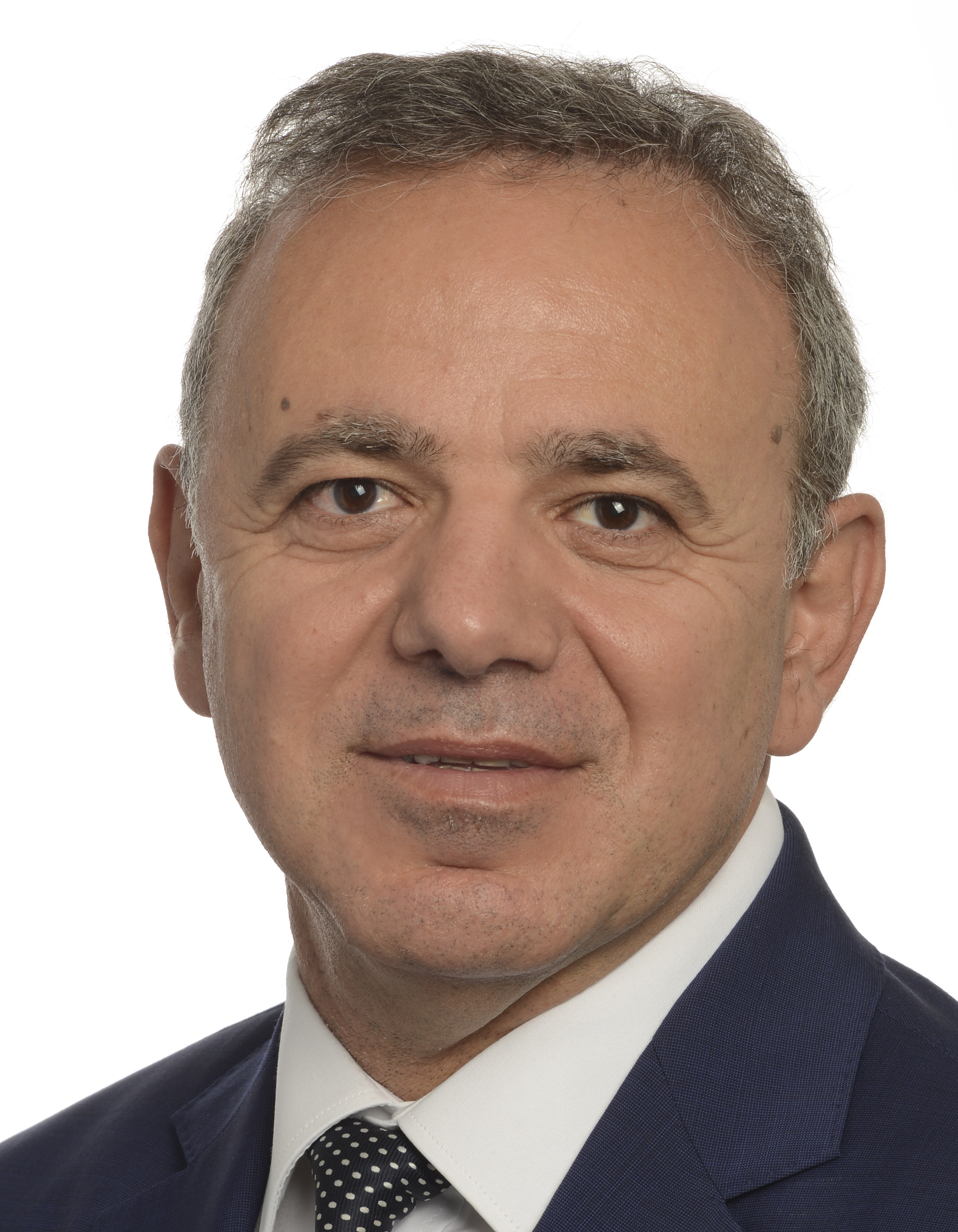
- Official portrait, 2019

Member of the European Parliament
- Incumbent
- Assumed office 1 July 2014
- Constituency: Cyprus

Personal details
- Born: 27 May 1962 (age 63) Kato Dikomo, Cyprus
- Party: Democratic Party
- Occupation: Politician

Costas Mavrides (born 27 May 1962) is a Cypriot politician, who since 2014, has been a Member of the European Parliament, representing Cyprus. He is a member of Democratic Party. He sits with the Progressive Alliance of Socialists and Democrats in the European Parliament.

== Early life and education ==
He was born in Kato Dikomo in 1962. He studied Economics at Rutgers University, and holds a PhD in Economics from Houston University.

He worked as an academic from 1995 until 2004, and taught at universities in the USA, Greece and Cyprus.

== Parliamentary service ==
- Member, Committee on Economic and Monetary Affairs
- Member, Delegation to the EU-Turkey Joint Parliamentary Committee
