= Bernocchi =

Bernocchi is an Italian surname. Notable people with the surname include:

- Antonio Bernocchi (1859–1930), business magnate and philanthropist
- Eraldo Bernocchi (born 1963), Italian musician
- Piero Bernocchi (born 1947), Italian trade unionist, writer and politician

== See also ==
- Coppa Bernocchi, bicycle race in Legnano, Italy
