= Luisa Morgantini =

Italian politician (born 1940)

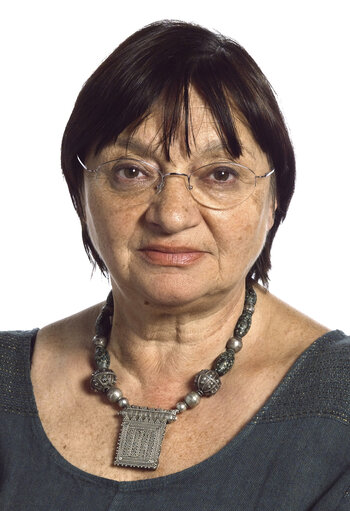
- Official portrait, 2012

Vice-President of the European Parliament
- In office 16 January 2007 – 13 July 2009 Serving with See List
- Preceded by: Sylviane H. Ainardi
- Succeeded by: Roberta Angelilli

Member of the European Parliament for Central Italy
- In office 20 July 1999 – 19 July 2004 Serving with Claudio Martelli
- Preceded by: Luciana Castellina
- In office 20 July 2004 – 13 July 2009
- Succeeded by: David Sassoli

Chair of the European Parliament Delegation for relations with Palestine
- In office 20 July 1999 – 14 January 2002
- In office 7 February 2002 – 19 July 2004
- Succeeded by: Adamos Adamou

Personal details
- Born: 5 November 1940 (age 85) Villadossola, Piedmont, Italy
- Party: Italy: Sinistra Italiana (since 2024); Independent (1967-2024); Italian Communist Party (1951-1967); EP: The Left (Refoundation)
- Website: luisamorgantini.net

Luisa Morgantini (born 5 November 1940) is an Italian politician who served as the Vice president in the 6th European parliament. She was elected an MEP as an independent with the nomination of the Communist Refoundation Party and sat with The left group in the European parliament.

She is one of the founders of the Italian branch of the Women in Black organisation.

== Career ==
Morgantini was the first woman elected to the secretariat of the FLM in Milan (Federation of Metalworkers – FIM, FIOM, UILM, representing FIM-CISL).

She was elected to the European Parliament in 1999 and re-elected in 2004 as an independent candidate on the list of the Communist Refoundation Party, in the central electoral district, after Fausto Bertinotti opted to take his seat in the southern district. Morgantini received 29,000 preference votes.

In January 2007, she was elected as the Vice President of the European Parliament, with responsibilities related to European policy on Africa and human rights. She was a member of several parliamentary committees, including the Committee on Development, the Committee on Women's Rights and Gender Equality, the Committee on Constitutional Affairs, and the Subcommittee on Human Rights. She was also the chair of the Delegation for relations with the Palestinian Legislative Council as well as member of the Delegation to the Euro-Mediterranean Parliamentary Assembly, and the ACP–EU Joint Parliamentary Assembly. Additionally, she contributed to the election observation working group and was involved in the Peace Initiatives Intergroup.

She was among the founders of the international network Women in Black against war and violence, and took part in the national coordination of the Association for Peace, a nonviolent movement. She also founded, and currently leads, the association AssoPacePalestina, which advocates for peace and human rights in Palestine.

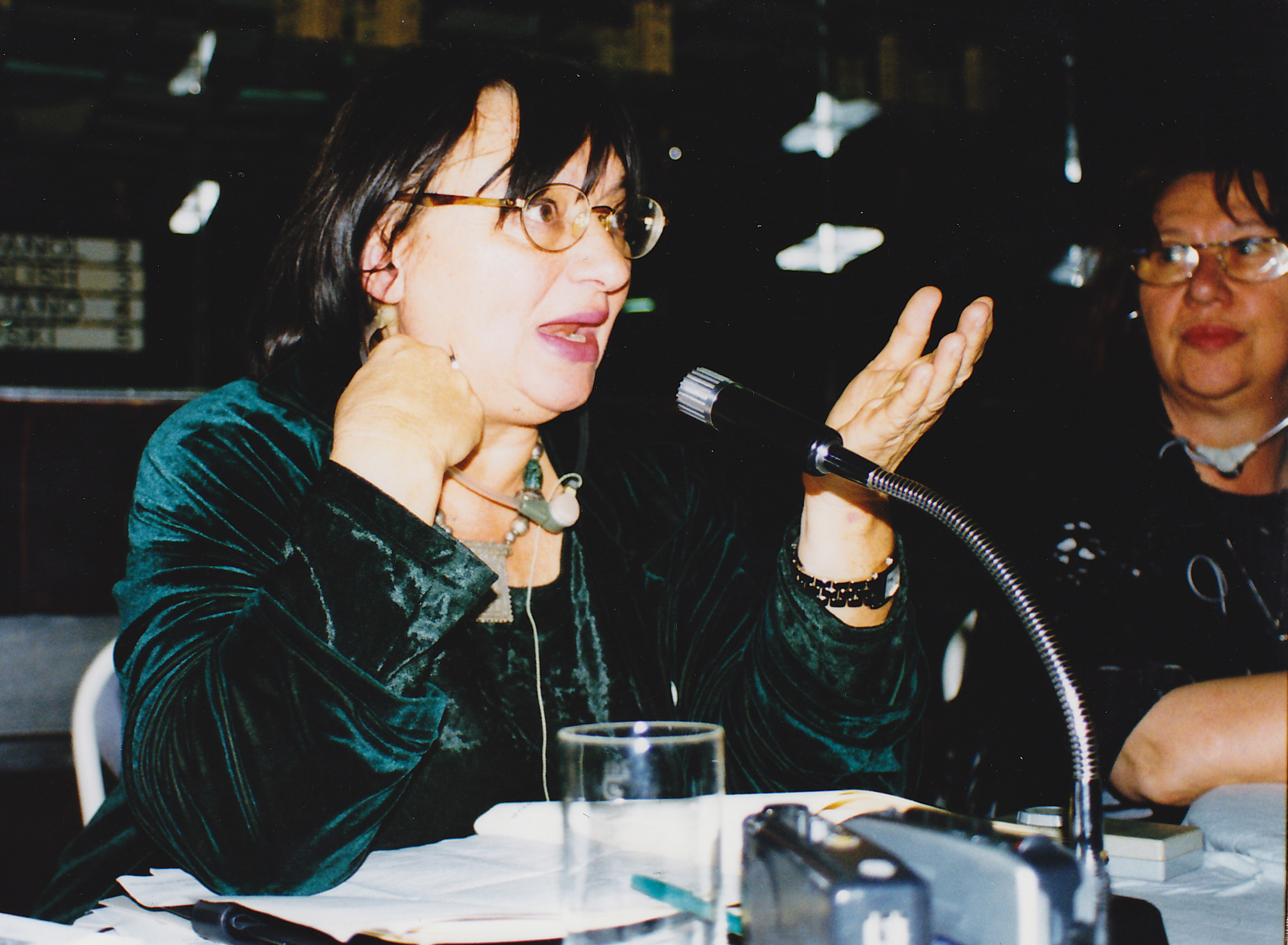
Morgantini at the International Women In Black meeting at Ulcinj, Montenegro in 1999.

Morgantini has received several recognitions, including a peace award from the Israeli branch of Women in Black and the Golden Doves for Peace Prize from the Disarmament Archive.

In 2023, Morgantini was one of 1,000 women who were nominated for the Nobel Peace Prize.

On January 30, 2025, she was arrested along with Il Sole 24 Ore journalist Roberto Bongiorni by the Israel Defense Forces in the settlement of Kiryat Arba, near Hebron. They were accused of entering a military area without authorization and were released a few hours later.

The arrest was criticized by public figures such as Nicola Fratoianni and by the Italian National Press Federation.

== Bibliography ==
- Oltre la danza macabra. No alla guerra, no al terrorismo (in Italian). Rome: Nutrimenti. 2004. ISBN 978-88-88389-22-6.
- al-Sa‘dawi, Nawal (2009). L'amore ai tempi del petrolio (in Italian). Translated by Marika Macco. Introduction by Luisa Morgantini. Fagnano Alto: il Sirente. ISBN 978-88-87847-16-1.
