= Italian Union of Textile, Energy and Chemical Workers =

Trade union of Italy

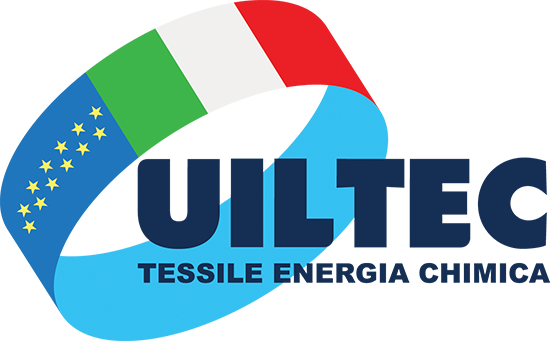

The Italian Union of Textile, Energy and Chemical Workers (Italian: Unione italiana lavoratori del tessile, energia e chimica, UILTEC) is a trade union representing manufacturing and utility workers in Italy.

The union was founded on 25 January 2013, when the Italian Union of Chemical, Energy and Manufacturing Workers merged with the Italian Union of Textile and Clothing Workers. Like both its predecessors, it affiliated to the Italian Labour Union. Its founding general secretary was Paolo Pirani. By the end of the year, it claimed 109,359 members.
