= Italian Union of Food Industry Workers =

Italian food and drink industry trade union

The Italian Union of Food Industry Workers (Italian: Unione Italiana Lavoratori Industrie Alimentari, UILIA) was a trade union representing workers in the food and drink industry in Italy.

The union was founded in 1950, and held its founding conference in 1953. It was a founding affiliate of the Italian Labour Union. By 1964, the union had 42,241 members. In 1994, it merged with the Italian Union of Food Industry Workers, to form the Italian Union of Agricultural and Food Workers.
