= Italian Union of Land Workers =

Trade union of Italy

The Italian Union of Landworkers (Italian: Unione Italiana Lavoratori della Terra, UIL-TERRA) was a trade union representing agricultural workers and farmers in Italy.

The union was founded in 1950, by former members of the National Federation of Agricultural Workers, and held its first conference in 1951. It was a founding affiliate of the Italian Labour Union, and also joined the International Landworkers' Federation. It grew rapidly, and by 1964, it had 488,697 members. That year, it split into the Italian Union of Agricultural Labourers and Workers and the Italian Union of Farm Owners and Tenants.

== General Secretaries ==
1950: Amedeo Sommovigo
1953: Aride Rossi
