= Italian Union of Public Administration Workers =

Trade union of Italy

The Italian Union of Public Administration Workers (Italian: Unione Italiana del Lavoro Pubblica Amministrazione, UILPA) is a trade union representing civil servants and related workers in Italy.

The union was founded in 1998, when the Italian Union of State Workers merged with the Italian Union of Public Employees, and the University and Research Federation. Like all its predecessors, it affiliated to the Italian Labour Union. Workers in universities and research later split away, to form the Italian Union of Research, University, and Higher Art and Musical Education Workers. As of 2004, the union claimed 67,702 members.

== General Secretaries ==
1998: Salvatore Bosco
c.2010: Nicola Turco
