= Italian Union of Agricultural and Food Workers =

Trade union of Italy

The Italian Union of Agricultural and Food Workers (Italian: Unione Italiana dei Lavori Agroalimentari, UILA) is a trade union representing workers in the agriculture and food processing sectors in Italy.

The union was founded in 1994, when the Italian Union of Agricultural Labourers and Workers merged with the Italian Union of Food Industry Workers. Like both its predecessors, it affiliated to the Italian Labour Union (UIL).

In 2004, UIL Monopoly was split up, with members who worked in the private sector transferring to the UILA, while in 2007, the Italian Union of Commerce and Sales Workers merged in. Finally, in 2009, it was joined by the Italian Union of Farm Owners and Tenants. The union's general secretary, Stefano Mantegazza, has been in post since 1995. As of 2017, the union had 226,551 members, making it the largest sectoral trade union affiliated to the UIL.

== General Secretaries ==
1994: Pierluigi Bertinelli
1995: Stefano Mantegazza
