= Italian Union of Local Authority Workers =

Trade union of Italy

The Italian Union of Local Authority Workers (Italian: Unione Italiana del Lavoro Federazione Poteri Locali, UILFPL) is a trade union representing health and local authority workers in Italy.

The union was founded in 2000, when the Italian Union of Hospital Workers merged with the National Union of Local Authority Employees. Like both its predecessors, it affiliated to the Italian Labour Union (UIL). By 2017, it had 225,940 members, making it one of the largest affiliates of the UIL.

== General Secretaries ==
2000: Carlo Fiordaliso
2009: Giovanni Torluccio
2016: Michelangelo Librandi
