= Italian Union of Clothing Workers =

Trade union of Italy

The Italian Union of Clothing Workers (Italian: Unione Italiana Lavoratori Abbigliamento, UILA) was a trade union representing workers in the garment industry in Italy.

The union was founded in 1953, although it did not hold its first conference until 1958. It affiliated to the Italian Union of Labour. By 1965, the union had 44,278 members. In 1969, it merged with the Italian Union of Textile Workers, to form the Italian Union of Textile and Clothing Workers.
