= Italian Union of Agricultural Labourers and Workers =

Trade union of Italy

The Italian Union of Agricultural Labourers and Workers (Italian: Unione Italiana Salariati e Braccianti Agricoli, UISBA) was a trade union representing agricultural workers in Italy.

The union was founded in 1964, when the Italian Union of Land Workers split into the UISBA and the Italian Union of Farm Owners and Tenants. Like its predecessor, it affiliate to the Italian Labour Union (UIL). UISBA also represented related workers, such as horticultural workers, agricultural clerks and technicians, and tobacconists. In 1974, the independent Italian Union of Reclamation and Irrigation Workers merged in, and became the subsidiary Italian Federation of Reclamation and Irrigation Workers (FILBI).

The union's last reported membership was 139,669. In 1994, it merged with the Italian Union of Food Industry Workers, to form the Italian Union of Agricultural and Food Workers.

== General Secretaries ==
1964: Livio Ligori
1973: Raffaele Bonino
1983: Pierluigi Bertinelli
