= Pietro Larizza =

Italian trade unionist (1935–2021)

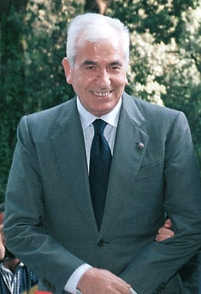
Pietro Larizza

Pietro Larizza (21 July 1935 – 1 March 2021) was an Italian trade unionist, politician and syndicalist.

Larizza was born in Reggio Calabria. He was the general secretary of the Italian Labour Union (UIL), one of the biggest Italian trade unions, from February 1992 to 2000.

== See also ==
- Italian Labour Union
