= Kyriacos Triantaphyllides =

Cypriot politician

- Κυριάκος Τριανταφυλλίδης
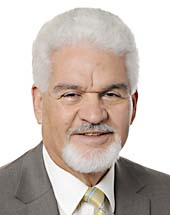
- Official portrait, 2007

Member of the European Parliament for Cyprus
- In office 2004–2014
- Succeeded by: Neoklis Sylikiotis

Chair of the European Parliament Delegation for relations with Palestine
- In office 21 March 2007 – 13 July 2009
- Preceded by: Adamos Adamou
- Succeeded by: Proinsias De Rossa

Personal details
- Born: 3 September 1944 (age 82) Palaichori Oreinis, Cyprus
- Party: Progressive Party of Working People
- Education: Victoria University of Wellington

Kyriacos Triantaphyllides (Greek: Κυριάκος Τριανταφυλλίδης; born 3 September 1944) is a Cypriot politician and Member of the European Parliament (MEP) for the Progressive Party of Working People, sitting with the European United Left–Nordic Green Left group, on the European Parliament's Committee on Regional Development.

He is member of the Committee on Regional Development, for the Delegation for relations with Australia and New Zealand and also for the Delegation to the Euro-Mediterranean Parliamentary Assembly

He is a substitute for the Committee on Civil Liberties, Justice and Home Affairs, substitute for the Delegation to the EU-Turkey Joint Parliamentary Committee.

== Education ==
- 1964-1966: Bachelor of Arts (BA) (University of Victoria, Wellington, New Zealand)
- 1967: Diploma from teacher training college of Christchurch (New Zealand)

== Career ==
- 1968-1970: Teacher of English and Social Studies at Wanganui High School (New Zealand).
- 1971-1973: Ministry of Employment and Social Affairs – Industrial Relations, Section Cyprus.
- 1974-1982: Head of Personnel with the Cyprus Amaniandos Asbestos Works Limited.
- 1982-1992: Senior public administration and personnel officer.
- 1992-1996: Chief administrative officer.
- 1992-2000: Deputy migration officer.
- 2000-2004: Director-General in the Ministry of the Interior.
- 1996-2000: Sub-Prefect of Famagusta.
- from 1990: Representative of Cyprus on Council of Europe committees.
- 2003: Member of the Policy Committee of the Council of European Municipalities and Regions.
- 1996-2000: Member of the Conference of Peripheral Maritime Regions of Europe.
- Ministry of the Interior representative in meetings and conferences at international level.
- 1988-2004: Founder member of Palaichori local associations.

== See also ==
- 2004 European Parliament election in Cyprus
