= Ruggero Ravenna =

Italian trade unionist and syndicalist (1925–2022)

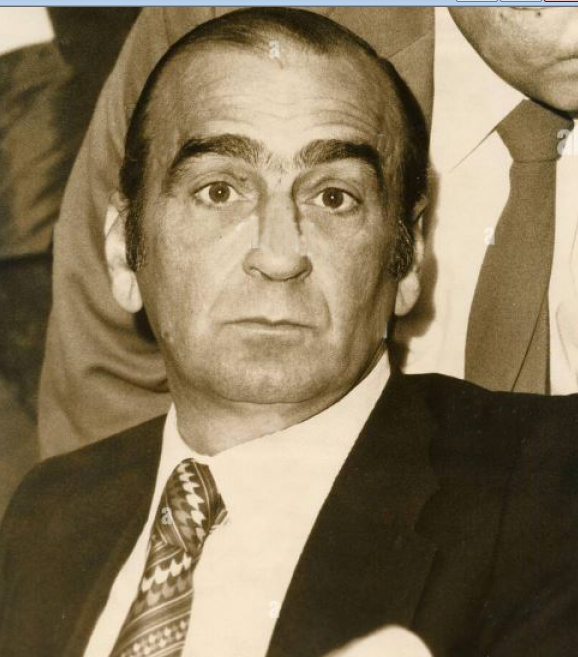
Ruggero Ravenna

Ruggero Ravenna (1925 – May 2022) was an Italian trade unionist and syndicalist.

In 1950, he was one of the founders of Italian Labour Union (UIL), which is one of the biggest Italian trade union centres. He was general secretary of UIL from 27 October 1969 to 27 October 1971 Ravenna died in May 2022.

== See also ==
- Italian Labour Union
