= Neoklis Sylikiotis =

Cypriot politician

Neoklis Sylikiotis MEP
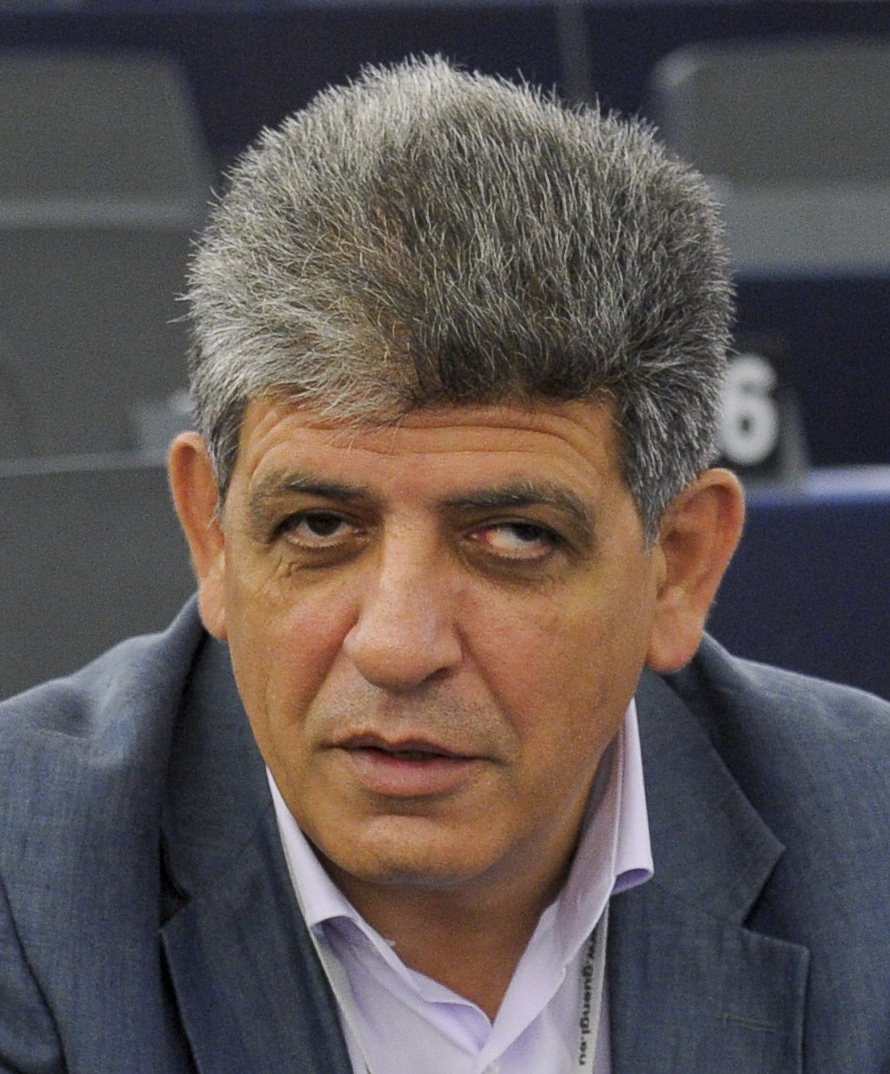

Member of the European Parliament for Cyprus
- Incumbent
- Assumed office July 2014
- Preceded by: Kyriacos Triantaphyllides

Minister of Commerce, Industry and Tourism
- In office March 2012 – February 2013
- President: Demetris Christofias
- Preceded by: Praxoula Antoniadou
- Succeeded by: Yiorgos Lakkotrypis

Minister of the Interior
- In office March 2008 – March 2012
- President: Demetris Christofias
- Preceded by: Christos Patsalides
- Succeeded by: Eleni Mavrou
- In office September 2006 – July 2007
- President: Tassos Papadopoulos
- Preceded by: Andreas Christou
- Succeeded by: Christos Patsalides

Chair of the European Parliament Delegation for relations with Palestine
- In office 30 January 2017 – 1 July 2019
- Preceded by: Martina Anderson
- Succeeded by: Manu Pineda

Personal details
- Born: 24 January 1959 (age 67) Limassol, Cyprus
- Party: AKEL
- Education: RWTH Aachen

Neoklis Sylikiotis (Greek: Νεοκλής Συλικιώτης; born 24 January 1959) is a Cypriot politician. From July 2014 to July 2019, he was a Member of the European Parliament and Vice-Chair of GUE/NGL. Sylikiotis was the Cypriot Minister of the Interior between September 2006 and July 2007, and again, between March 2008 and March 2012. Between March 2012 and February 2013, he was Minister of Commerce, Industry and Tourism. Sylikiotis is a member of leftist party AKEL.

== Personal life and education ==
Sylikiotis was born in Limassol in 1959. He studied mechanical engineering at RWTH Aachen. He is married and has a son.
