= National Union of Local Authority Employees =

Trade union of Italy

The Italian Union of Local Authority Employees (Italian: Unione Nazionale Dipendenti e Locali, UNDEL) was a trade union representing workers employed by local authorities and their agencies, in Italy.

The union was founded in 1950, and was a founding affiliate of the Italian Labour Union (UIL). It held its first conference in 1953.

By 1964, the union had 66,259 members, and this grew to 89,207 in 1997. In 2000, it merged with the Italian Union of Hospital Workers, to form the Italian Union of Local Authority Workers.
