= Italian Union of Hospital Workers =

Trade union of Italy

The Italian Union of Hospital Workers (Italian: Unione Italiana del Lavoro Sanità, UIL SANITA) was a trade union representing workers in the healthcare sector in Italy.

The union was founded in 1950 as the Italian Union of Autonomous Hospital Unions, and was a founding affiliate of the Italian Labour Union (UIL). It held its first conference in 1953.

By 1997, the union had 99,596 members. In 2000, it merged with the National Union of Local Authority Employees, to form the Italian Union of Local Authority Workers.
