= Italian Union of Transport Auxiliaries and Port Workers =

Trade union of Italy

The Italian Union of Transport Auxiliaries and Port Workers (Italian: Unione italiana lavoratori trasporti ausiliari del traffico e portuali, UILTATEP) was a trade union representing workers involved in transporting goods.

The union was founded in 1951, as the Italian Union of Auxiliary Transport Workers, and it affiliated to the Italian Labour Union (UIL). In 1962, the Italian Union of Port Workers merged in, and it adopted its final name.

In 1964, it was the second-largest affiliate of the UIL, with 134,280 members, but by 1981, this had fallen to 51,085. In 1983, it merged with the Italian Railway Workers' Union, the Italian Union of Air Workers, the Italian Union of Seamen, and the National Federation of Local Transport and Inland Waterways, to form the Italian Union of Transport Workers.
