= Italian Union of School Workers =

Trade union of Italy

The Italian Union of School Workers (Italian: Unione Italiana del Lavoro Scuola, UIL SCUOLA) is a trade union representing workers in the education sector in Italy.

In 1959, the Trade Union Movement of Schoolmaster Unity was established, representing primary school teachers. It joined the Italian Labour Union (UIL), and in 1961 dissolved itself into the new Independent Italian Primary School Union. In 1965, it began admitting all school and university staff, at all levels of teaching, and renamed itself as the Italian Federation of Independent School Workers. In 1973, it also began representing workers in vocational education, and adopted its current name.

In 1976, the union absorbed the Independent Federation of Non-Teaching Staff Unions, and parts of three independent education unions also transferred. By 1997, the union had 59,296 members.

== General Secretaries ==
1961: Benito Renzi
1965: Giorgio Ferrari
1973: Nunzio Penna
1970s: Benito Renzi
1977: Domenico Buttinelli (acting)
1979: Osvaldo Pagliuca
1998: Massimo Di Menna
2015: Pino Turi
