= Italian Union of Postal Workers =

Trade union of Italy

The Italian Union of Postal Workers (Italian: Unione Italiana Lavoratori poste, UIL POSTE) is a trade union representing workers at Poste italiane.

The union was founded on 21 March 1950, as the Italian Union of Post and Telecommunication Workers. It affiliated to the recently founded Italian Labour Union. By 1965, it had only 9,900 members, but by 2013 this had grown to 29,540.
