= Eleni Mavrou =

Cypriot politician (born 1961)

- Ελένη Μαύρου
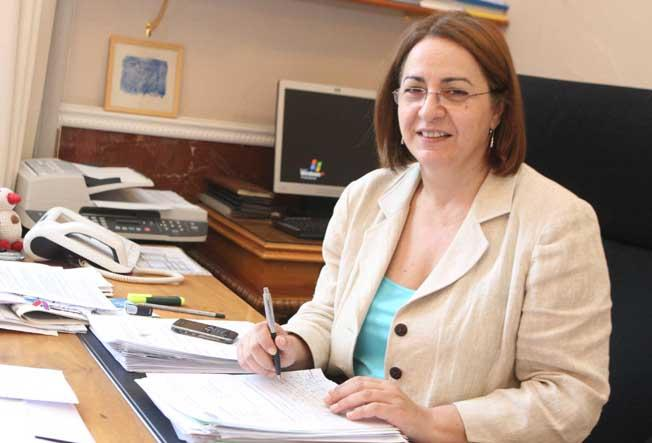
- Mavrou in 2011

Representative of Nicosia
- In office 2001-2006 Serving with Members of House of Representatives of Cyprus
- Incumbent
- Assumed office 2016-2021 Serving with Members of House of Representatives of Cyprus

Minister of Interior of Cyprus
- In office 2012–2013
- Appointed by: Demetris Christofias
- Preceded by: Neoklis Sylikiotis
- Succeeded by: Socratis Hasikos

Mayor of Nicosia
- In office 2007–2011
- Preceded by: Michael Zampelas
- Succeeded by: Constantinos Yiorkadjis

Personal details
- Born: Eleni Mavrou; 2 February 1961 (age 65) Kyrenia District, Cyprus
- Other political affiliations: Progressive Party of Working People
- Education: Higher Technological Institute, University of London,(Bachelor of Science)
- Committees: House Standing Committee of the Environment, House Standing Committee on Internal Affairs, House Standing Committee on Labour, Welfare and Social Insurance (2016-2019)

Eleni Mavrou (Greek: Ελένη Μαύρου, Eléni Mávrou) is a Cypriot politician currently serving as the Executive Chairman of Dialogos Media Group. She served as Minister of Interior of the Republic of Cyprus until February 2013. From 2007 to 2011, she served as the mayor of the capital city, Nicosia. Thus, Mavrou became the first female mayor of Nicosia, as well as the first female Minister of Interior.

Born in Kyrenia in 1961, her family was forced to leave their house in 1974 due to the Turkish invasion of Cyprus, and since then they have lived in Nicosia.

== Student career ==
Mavrou initially studied Civil Engineering at the Higher Technical Institute in Nicosia, but continued her education at the University of London, where she obtained her BSc degree in Politics and International Relations.

During her student years, Mavrou was actively involved in Cypriot local student movement, and later in the progressive youth movement. Among other things, she held the position of Vice President of the Cyprus Federation of Students and Young Scientists, and was appointed Secretary General of EDON.

== Political career ==
As a member of AKEL's Central Committee, Mavrou's efforts were focused on the areas of Local Authority and the Environment for many years. She demonstrated a great interest in human rights issues, and played an active role in the women's movement.

She served as a Councilor on the Nicosia Municipal Council for two consecutive terms, from 1986 to 1996. In 2001, she was elected in Nicosia to be among AKEL's members of the House of Representatives, and was re-elected to the same position in 2006.

She served as President of the House Committee on the Environment, and as a member of the House Committees on Internal Affairs and Human Rights.

She was a member of the European Convention on the Future of the European Union, and in 2003 was appointed by the House of Representatives as a Cyprus observer at the European Parliament. After Cyprus's accession to the European Union, and until the elected Cyprus Members of the European Parliament took office, Mavrou represented Cyprus at the European Parliament. During the same period, she was a member of the Committee for the Environment, Public Health, and Food Safety, as well as the Committee for Civil Liberties, Justice, and Internal Affairs.

In the municipal elections which were held on 17 December 2006, she ran as the candidate of the Municipal Coalition which united the three parties of AKEL, DIKO, and EDEK. She was elected Mayor of Nicosia, and became the first female mayor of the capital of Cyprus. She took office on 2 January 2007, and held the post until 31 December 2011. On 20 March 2012 she was appointed Minister of Interior.

Mavrou has been awarded the decoration of Chevalier of the National Order of the Legion of Honour of the French Republic, as well as the Grand Decoration of Honour in Silver with Sash for Services to the Republic of Austria (2007). She is also long-listed for the 2008 World Mayor award.
