= Piero Bernocchi =

Italian trade unionist (born 1947)

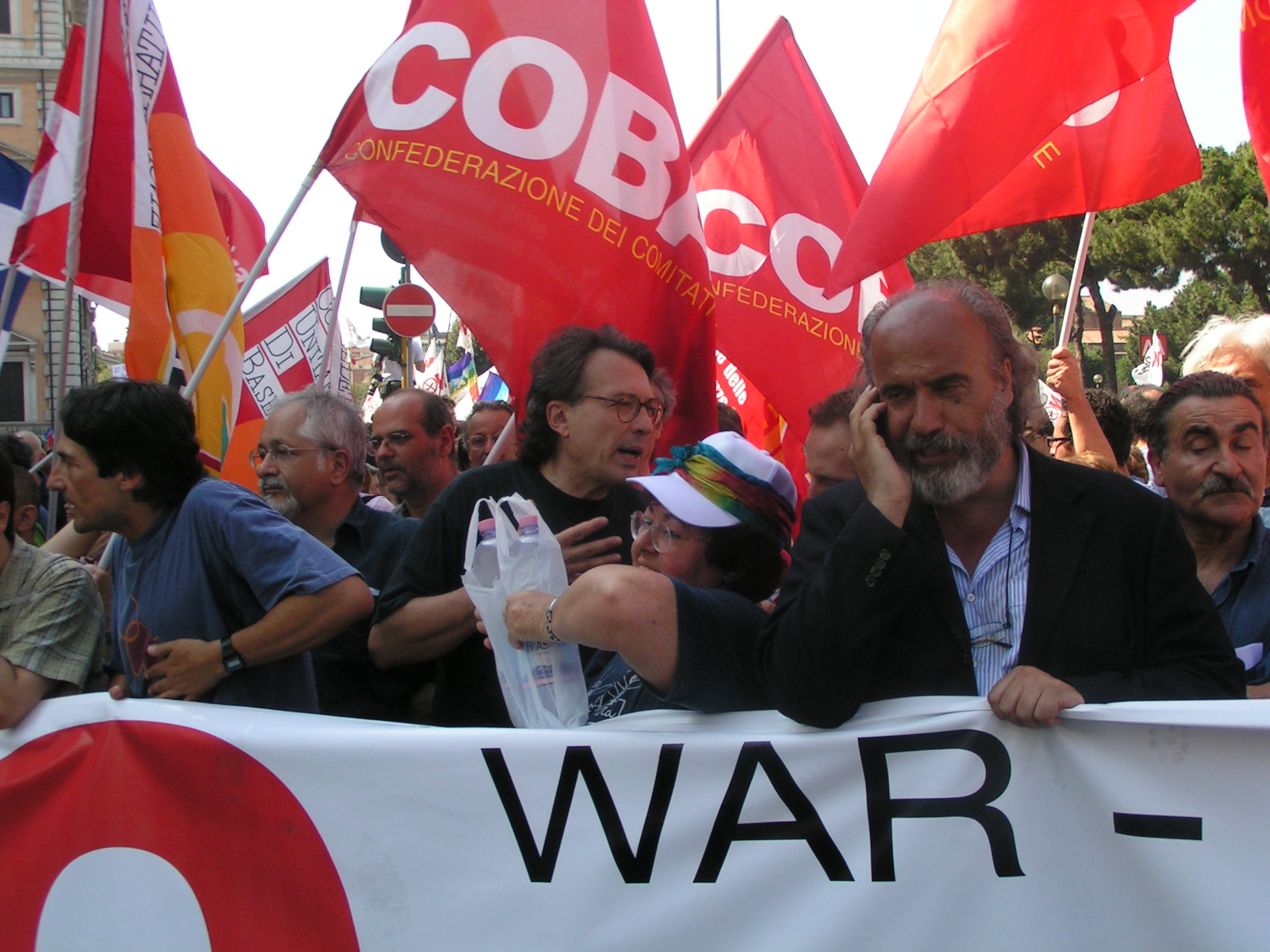
Bernocchi, Giorgio Cremaschi, and Marco Ferrando marching against the war in Iraq on the day Bush was in Rome, June 2007

Piero Bernocchi (born 1947) is an Italian teacher, trade union officer, and politician. He was a principal founder of Cobas, a workerist organization.

== Biography ==
Bernocchi was born on 13 September 1947 in Foligno, Italy. He participated in the Italian social movements of the 1960s and the 1970s. Since 1968, he has been part of the coordination team for the departments of Science, as well as the Workers' Committee and leader of the movement at the Faculty of Engineering at the University of Rome. Among the main representatives of the movement of 1977, he was the director of a radio station, Radio Città Futura, a free Italian Radio.

Bernocchi contributed to the creation of the Cobas school unit, which started in 1987. He is still the spokesman of the Cobas school unit and of the Cobas Confederation. He played a notable role in the organization of the World and European Social Forum against the liberal globalization movement starting from the first edition of the World Social Forum (WSF) in Porto Alegre in 2001 and of the European Social Forum (ESF) in Florence in 2002. He is also among the leaders of the 'noglobal' Italian movement, which was started in Genoa during the anti-G8 days in July 2001.

== Bibliography ==
He has written essays, articles, and the following books:

- Le "Riforme" in URSS, La Salamandra, 1977
- Movimento settantasette, storia di una lotta (with E. Compagnoni, P. D'Aversa and R. Striano), Rosemberg & Sellier, 1979
- Capire Danzica Edizioni Quotidiano dei Lavoratori, 1980
- Oltre il muro di Berlino. Le ragioni della rivolta in Germania Est, Massari, 1990
- Dal sindacato ai Cobas. Massari, 1993
- Dal '77 in poi, Massari, 1997
- Per una critica del '68. Massari, 1998
- Scuola-azienda e istruzione-merce, AA.VV., Ed. Cesp-Cobas, 2000
- Vecchi e nuovi saperi, AA.VV., Ed. Cesp-Cobas, 2001
- "Un altro mondo in costruzione" (con AA.VV.), Baldini & Castoldi, 2002
- Nel cuore delle lotte Edizioni Colibrì, 2004
- In movimento (written from 2000 to 2008), Massari, 2008
- Vogliamo un altro mondo, Datanews, 2008
- Benicomunismo, Massari Editore, 2012
- Oltre il capitalismo, Massari Editore, 2015
- Pandemie virali e contagi politici, Massari Editore, 2020;
- C’era una volta il PCI (with Roberto Massari), Massari Editore, 2021
