= Socratis Hasikos =

Cypriot politician (1956–2021)

Socratis Hasikos (12 April 1956 – 5 April 2021) was a Cypriot politician. He was the Minister of the Interior (2013–17) and Minister of the Defence (1999–2003, 2014).

Hasikos was born in Nicosia on 12 April 1956. He grew up in the village of Dikomo in Kyrenia District. He studied law at the National and Kapodistrian University of Athens. Hasikos’ wife, Elli Koulermou, died of cancer in 2019 aged 64. He is survived by two sons and a daughter.
