= Christodoulos Taramountas =

Cypriot lawyer and politician (1957–2022)

Member of the House of Representatives of Cyprus
- In office 7 June 2001 – 31 May 2006
- Constituency: Kyrenia

Personal details
- Born: 2 May 1957 Kato Dikomo, British Cyprus
- Died: 8 November 2022 (aged 65)
- Party: DISY (until 2004); EvroDi (2004–2005); Evroko (2005–2013); Citizens' Alliance
- Education: National and Kapodistrian University of Athens
- Occupation: Lawyer

Christodoulos Taramountas (Greek: Χριστόδουλος Ταραμουντάς; 2 May 1957 – 8 November 2022) was a Cypriot lawyer and politician. A member of the Democratic Rally, European Democracy, and the European Party, he served in the House of Representatives from 2001 to 2006.

Taramountas died on 8 November 2022, at the age of 65.
