= Italian Union of Communication Workers =

Trade union of Italy

The Italian Union of Communication Workers (Italian: Unione Italiana Lavoratori Comunicazione, UILCOM) is a trade union representing workers in the printing, media, entertainment, broadcasting and leisure industries in Italy.

The union was established in 2002, at a conference in Fiuggi, when the Italian Union of Telecommunication Workers merged with the Italian Union of Press, Entertainment, Information and Cultural Workers. Like both its predecessors, it affiliated to the Italian Labour Union (UIL). By 2013, the union claimed 40,937 members.

== General Secretaries ==
2002: Bruno Di Cola
2014: Salvatore Ugliarolo
