= Luigi Angeletti =

Italian trade unionist and syndicalist

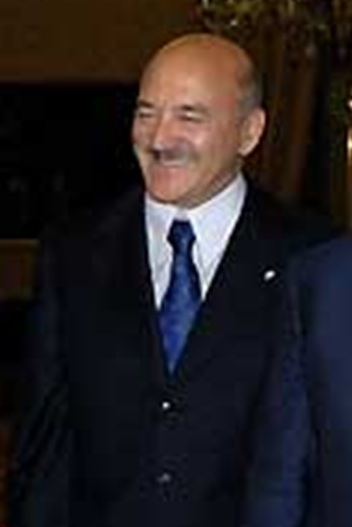
Luigi Angeletti (2006)

Luigi Angeletti (born 20 May 1949) is an Italian trade unionist and syndicalist. He is the former general secretary of Italian Labour Union (UIL).

Angeletti was born in Greccio, Italy.

== Biography ==
He worked for a long time at the O.M.I. (Optical Mechanics Italian), an engineering company in Rome, in which he was steward. This company began its labor militancy that will take him to the secretary of the UIL organization congenial to him since then, close to the Socialist Party. From 1975 to 1980 he was appointed Provincial Secretary of the LWF Uilm and Rome. He was also involved in the Italian Socialist Party (PSI).

In 1980 he was elected to the National Secretary of the Italian Union of Metalworkers, becoming General Secretary in February 1992; in this role, in July 1994, made the first renewal of the metalworkers' contract without a single hour to strike. Even as General Secretary of the Uilm is one of the organizers and founders of the supplementary pension fund of the metalworkers CO.ME.TA (1997). Its secretariat to Uilm was also marked from assets supporting the birth of the Fiat plant in Melfi at the time one of the most advanced in Europe.

In 1998 he was elected Secretary of the Confederation UIL. In his new role dealing with contractual policies and industrial policies for all sectors of industry and belonging to the confederation. On 13 June 2000 he was elected Secretary-General of the UIL, serving until 2014.

== See also ==
- Italian Labour Union
