= Italian Union of Transport Workers =

Trade union of Italy

The Italian Union of Transport Workers (Italian: Unione Italiana dei Lavoratori dei Trasporti, UILT) is a trade union representing workers in the transport industry in Italy.

The union was founded in 1983, with the merger of the Italian Union of Transport Auxiliaries and Port Workers, with the Italian Railway Workers' Union, the Italian Union of Air Workers, the Italian Union of Seamen, and the National Federation of Local Transport and Inland Waterways. Like all its predecessors, it affiliate to the Italian Labour Union. By 2013, the union claimed 117,846 members.
