= List of ministers of defence of Cyprus =

Minister of Defence
- Υπουργείο Άμυνας
- Flag of Cyprus
- Incumbent; Vasilis Palmas since 10 March 2024
- Ministry of Defense
- Reports to: The President
- Formation: 1960
- Website: mod.gov.cy

List of ministers of defence of the Republic of Cyprus since the independence in 1960:

Minister	Began	Ended
Osman Orek	1960	1964
Polycarpos Yiorkadjis	4 April 1964	1 November 1968
Epaminondas Komodromos	10 December 1968	15 June 1972
Yorgos Ioannidis	16 June 1972	15 July 1974
Nikos Kosis	8 August 1974	14 January 1975
Christodoulos Veniamin	15 January 1975	6 January 1985
Stelios Katsellis	7 January 1985	31 July 1985
Elias Eliadis	1 August 1985	27 February 1988
Andreas Aloneftis	28 January 1988	27 February 1993
kostas Eliadis	27 February 1993	12 November 1997
Georgios Haralambidis	12 November 1997	27 February 1998
Yiannakis Omirou	28 February 1998	4 January 1999
Yiannakis Hrysostomis	5 January 1999	24 August 1999
Socratis Hasikos	25 August 1999	28 February 2003
Kyriakos Mavronikolas	29 February 2003	13 June 2006
Fivos Klokaris	13 June 2006	26 September 2006
Nicos Symeonidis	16 September 2006	3 May 2007
Christodoulos Pasiardis	14 May 2007	29 February 2008
kostas Papacostas	29 February 2008	14 July 2011
Demetris Eliades	14 July 2011	1 March 2013
Photis Photiou	2 March 2013	13 March 2014
Tasos Mitsopoulos	13 March 2014	22 March 2014
Socratis Hasikos	23 March 2014	6 April 2014
Christoforos Fokaides	7 April 2014	28 February 2018
Savvas Angelides	1 March 2018	30 June 2020
Charalambos Petrides	30 June 2020	3 March 2023
Michalis Giorgallas	3 March 2023	10 January 2024
Vasilis Palmas	10 January 2024	
