= Eoin Ó Broin =

Irish politician (born 1972)

Eoin Ó Broin TD
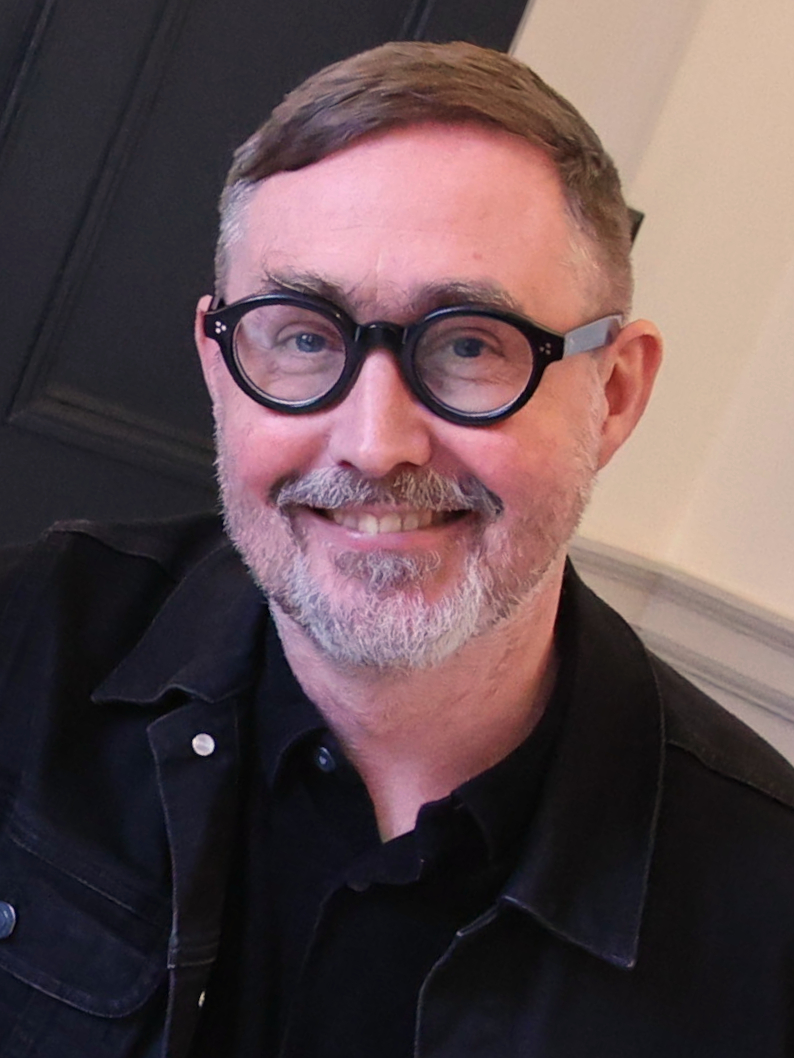
- Ó Broin in 2024

Teachta Dála
- Incumbent
- Assumed office February 2016
- Constituency: Dublin Mid-West

Belfast City Councillor
- In office 7 June 2001 – 2004
- Preceded by: Mick Conlon
- Succeeded by: Carál Ní Chuilín
- Constituency: Oldpark

Personal details
- Born: September 1972 (age 53) Cabinteely, Dublin, Ireland
- Party: Sinn Féin
- Domestic partner: Lynn Boylan
- Education: University of East London; Queen's University Belfast

Eoin Ó Broin (Irish pronunciation: [ˈoːnʲ oː ˈbˠɾˠɪnʲ]; born September 1972) is an Irish Sinn Féin politician and writer who has been a Teachta Dála (TD) for Dublin Mid-West since the 2016 general election.

== Background ==
Ó Broin is from Cabinteely, County Dublin. He was educated at Crown Woods School and Blackrock College. He holds a degree in Cultural Studies from the University of East London and an MA in Irish politics from Queen's University Belfast. For a period in the late 1980s he was the bassist in Dublin rock band The Foremen, with whom he performed on the RTÉ TV show Jo Maxi in 1989.

== Political career ==
Ó Broin was elected at the 2001 Belfast City Council election, stepping down from Belfast City Council in 2004. He was the National Organiser of Ógra Shinn Féin between 1995 and 1997. He was Sinn Féin's Director of European Affairs co-ordinating his party's team in the European Parliament in Brussels, from 2004 to 2007. He is a former member of Sinn Féin's governing body and a regular columnist with the republican newspaper An Phoblacht.

He campaigned against the Treaty of Lisbon and spoke at the National Forum on Europe on behalf of Sinn Féin and the No 2 Lisbon campaign.

He is a published writer. His first book, Matxinada - Basque Nationalism and Radical Basque Youth Movements was published in English in 2004 and in Spanish in 2005. His second book, Sinn Féin and the Politics of Left Republicanism was published by Pluto Press in 2009. Ó Broin is also the editor of Left Republican Review. As a freelance writer he has articles published in An Phoblacht, Magill, Village Magazine and The Irish Times.

He was an unsuccessful Sinn Féin candidate for Dún Laoghaire at the 2007 general election. He ran for Dublin Mid-West at the 2011 general election. He polled 5,060 votes and was beaten to the last seat in the constituency by Derek Keating of Fine Gael. He contested the election to the 24th Seanad, but was defeated. In 2013, Ó Broin was co-opted by Sinn Féin onto South Dublin County Council to represent Clondalkin local electoral area, after sitting councillor Matthew McDonagh resigned his seat.

In the 2016 general election, he topped the poll in Dublin Mid-West with 22.7% of the first preference votes, and was elected on the first count. Mark Ward was co-opted to fill Ó Broin's seat on South Dublin County Council.

At the 2019 Dublin Mid-West by-election, held to fill a vacancy following Frances Fitzgerald's election as an MEP, Ó Broin managed the campaign of the Sinn Féin candidate Mark Ward. Wards's victory gave Sinn Féin two of the constituency's four seats. At the 2020 general election, Ó Broin again topped the poll, with 26.1% of the first-preference votes. He was again re-elected on the first count, and his transfers secured Mark Ward's re-election on the second count.

As of 2021, Ó Broin is Sinn Féin's spokesperson on housing. In May 2019, he published a book entitled Home: Why Public Housing is the Answer which specifically addressed the issue of housing in Ireland. Home was generally well received by critics in Ireland, and became a surprise bestseller. Housing proved one of the key issues in the 2020 Irish general election and factored into Sinn Féin's significant gains in the voting.

== Personal life ==
Ó Broin is the partner of Lynn Boylan, a Sinn Féin MEP for Dublin.

== Bibliography ==
- Matxinada. Basque Nationalism & Radical Basque Youth Movements (2008)
- Sinn Féin and the politics of left republicanism (2009)
- A Better Ireland: Arguments for a New Republic (2015)
- Home: Why Public Housing is the Answer (2019)
- Defects: Living with the Legacy of the Celtic Tiger (2021)
- The Dignity of Everyday Life: Celebrating Michael Scott's Busáras (2021) [with Mal McCann]
- Flats & Cottages, Herbert Simms & the housing of Dublin's working class 1932-1948 (2025) [with Mal McCann]

Dáil	Election	Deputy (Party)	Deputy (Party)	Deputy (Party)	Deputy (Party)	Deputy (Party)
29th	2002	Paul Gogarty (GP)	3 seats 2002–2007	Mary Harney (PDs)	John Curran (FF)	4 seats 2002–2024
30th	2007	Paul Gogarty (GP)	Joanna Tuffy (Lab)	Mary Harney (PDs)	John Curran (FF)	4 seats 2002–2024
31st	2011	Robert Dowds (Lab)	Joanna Tuffy (Lab)	Frances Fitzgerald (FG)	Derek Keating (FG)	4 seats 2002–2024
32nd	2016	Gino Kenny (AAA–PBP)	Eoin Ó Broin (SF)	Frances Fitzgerald (FG)	John Curran (FF)	4 seats 2002–2024
32nd	2019 by-election	Gino Kenny (AAA–PBP)	Eoin Ó Broin (SF)	Mark Ward (SF)	John Curran (FF)	4 seats 2002–2024
33rd	2020	Gino Kenny (S–PBP)	Eoin Ó Broin (SF)	Mark Ward (SF)	Emer Higgins (FG)	4 seats 2002–2024
34th	2024	Paul Gogarty (Ind.)	Eoin Ó Broin (SF)	Mark Ward (SF)	Emer Higgins (FG)	Shane Moynihan (FF)
