= European Parliament Delegation for relations with Palestine =

European parliament delegation

European Parliament Delegation for relations with Palestine (DPAL)
- European Parliament

Type
- Type: Parliamentary delegation of the European Parliament
- Established: 1996 (as Delegation for relations with the Palestinian Legislative Council, DPLC)

Leadership
- Chair: Lynn Boylan, The Left since 30 September 2024

Structure
- Seats: 25 (currently)
- Political groups: S&D (6) Renew (4) The Left (4) ECR (4) Verts/ALE (4) PfE (1) PPE (1) NI (1)
- Length of term: 5 years

Website
- Official website

The Delegation for relations with Palestine (DPAL) is an official delegation of the European Parliament responsible for maintaining parliamentary relations with the Palestinian Legislative Council (PLC). The delegation plays a key role in promoting the European Union’s commitment to a two-state solution in the region.

DPAL is part of the European Parliament's broader framework for international parliamentary cooperation and is composed of Members of the European Parliament (MEPs) from various political groups and member states.

== History ==
The European Parliament's engagement with the Palestinian people began in November 1993, shortly after the signing of the Oslo Accords between the Government of Israel and the Palestine Liberation Organization (PLO). In response, the Parliament created an ad hoc delegation to manage relations with the Palestinian leadership.

Following the establishment of the Palestinian National Authority in 1994, the Parliament formalized its engagement by establishing a standing delegation, officially titled the "Delegation for relations with the Palestinian Legislative Council (DPLC)", on 12 December 1996.

On 9 September 2015, the delegation was renamed the "Delegation for relations with Palestine (DPAL)". This change followed the Parliament's adoption of a resolution on 17 December 2014, expressing support in principle for the recognition of Palestinian statehood.

Although political groups in the Parliament have occasionally proposed creating a single joint delegation for managing relations with both Israel and the Palestinian territories, such a proposal has not been implemented.

From 1999, the delegation was chaired by Italian MEP Luisa Morgantini, who played a prominent role in advocating for Palestinian right of return. Morgantini led missions to Gaza, condemning the siege and describing the territory as an "open-air prison".

In 2004, Cypriot MEP Adamos Adamou succeeded Morgantini as chair, serving until 2009. During his tenure, the delegation faced difficulties accessing Gaza, particularly after the 2008–2009 Gaza conflict. Israeli authorities began blocking DPAL visits, citing security concerns. These restrictions intensified in subsequent years, with delegations repeatedly denied entry to Gaza, compelling the delegation to meet Palestinian representatives primarily in the West Bank and East Jerusalem.

The delegation's chairs throughout the 2010s, including Kyriacos Triantaphyllides, Neoklis Sylikiotis, and later Manu Pineda, continued to highlight human rights violations and the adverse effects of the Israeli blockade on Gaza. In response, Israeli authorities increasingly barred individual members from entry due to their activism or association with pro-Palestinian initiatives such as flotillas aiming to break the blockade.

In May 2022, Chair Manu Pineda was officially denied entry into Israel ahead of a planned delegation visit to investigate the killing of journalist Shireen Abu Akleh, sparking protests from, Roberta Metsola, the President of the European Parliament. Similar denials followed in 2023, with another delegation member, Ana Miranda Paz, deported despite prior approval, due to her participation in freedom flotillas.

Similarly, In early 2025 when Chair Lynn Boylan and fellow MEP Rima Hassan (of Palestinian origin) were denied entry at Ben Gurion Airport, leading to the cancellation of the delegation's mission. This action, including the confiscation of diplomatic passports and phones, was condemned by the European Parliament as "a serious affront to diplomatic norms" and the EU's role in the Middle East peace process.

== Members ==
As of the current term, the Delegation consists of 14 full members and 11 substitute members. It is chaired by Lynn Boylan (The Left, Ireland), with Barry Andrews (Renew, Ireland) serving as First Vice-Chair, and Matjaž Nemec (S&D, Slovenia) as Second Vice-Chair.

Current members
Member	Role	European parliamentary group	Country	National party/alliance
Lynn Boylan	Chair	The Left in the European Parliament	Ireland	Sinn Féin
Barry Andrews	Vice-Chair	Renew Europe	Ireland	Fianna Fáil
Matjaž Nemec	Vice-Chair	Progressive Alliance of Socialists and Democrats	Slovenia	Social Democrats
Maravillas Abadía	Member	European People's Party Group	Spain	People's Party
Galato Alexandraki	Member	European Conservatives and Reformists Group	Greece	Greek Solution
Jaume Asens	Member	Greens–European Free Alliance	Spain	Sumar
Adrian-George Axinia	Member	European Conservatives and Reformists Group	Romania	Alliance for the Union of Romanians
Annalisa Corrado	Member	Progressive Alliance of Socialists and Democrats	Italy	Democratic Party
Rima Hassan	Member	The Left in the European Parliament	France	La France Insoumise
Pierre Jouvet	Member	Progressive Alliance of Socialists and Democrats	France	Socialist Party
Irena Joveva	Member	Renew Europe	Slovenia	Freedom Movement
Lefteris Nikolaou-Alavanos	Member	NI	Greece	Communist Party of Greece
Villy Søvndal	Member	Greens–European Free Alliance	Denmark	Green Left
Matthieu Valet	Member	Patriots for Europe	France	National Rally
Substitute
Alex Agius Saliba	Substitute	Progressive Alliance of Socialists and Democrats	Malta	Labour Party
Marc Botenga	Substitute	The Left in the European Parliament	Belgium	Workers' Party of Belgium
Sigrid Friis Frederiksen	Substitute	Renew Europe	Denmark	Danish Social Liberal Party
Ana Miranda Paz	Substitute	Greens-European Free Alliance	Spain	Galician Nationalist Bloc
Irene Montero	Substitute	The Left in the European Parliament	Spain	Podemos
Leoluca Orlando	Substitute	Greens-European Free Alliance	Italy	Independent
Elena Sancho Murillo	Substitute	Progressive Alliance of Socialists and Democrats	Spain	Spanish Socialist Workers' Party
Antonella Sberna	Substitute	European Conservatives and Reformists Group	Italy	Brothers of Italy
Cecilia Strada	Substitute	Progressive Alliance of Socialists and Democrats	Italy	Democratic Party
Francesco Ventola	Substitute	European Conservatives and Reformists Group	Italy	Brothers of Italy
Lucia Yar	Substitute	Renew Europe	Slovakia	Progressive Slovakia

== List of Chairs ==
Portrait	Office holder	Term start	Term end	Nationality	European Parliament Group	Post in Parliament	Parliament	Source
	Luisa Morgantini	20 July 1999 (Note: Not in office between 14 January and 7 February 2002.)	19 July 2004	Italy	The Left	Vice president of the European Parliament (2007–2009); Chair of the Committee on Development (2004–2006); Subcommittee on Human Rights	Fifth	
	Adamos Adamou	20 September 2004	14 March 2007	Cyprus	The Left	Member of the Committee on Regional Development	Sixth	
	Kyriacos Triantaphyllides	21 March 2007	13 July 2009	Cyprus	The Left	Member of the Committee on Regional Development; delegations to EU–Australia/New Zealand and Euro-Mediterranean	Sixth	
	Proinsias De Rossa	16 September 2009	1 February 2012	Ireland	S&D	Member of the Committee on Employment and Social Affairs	Seventh	
	Martina Anderson	13 October 2014	29 January 2017	United Kingdom	The Left	Member of the Committee on Civil Liberties, Justice and Home Affairs	Eighth	
	Neoklis Sylikiotis	30 January 2017	1 July 2019	Cyprus	The Left	Substitute in ACP‑EU & Mediterranean delegations	Eighth	
	Manu Pineda	26 September 2019	15 July 2024	Spain	The Left	Shadow rapporteur in AFET	Ninth	
	Lynn Boylan	30 September 2024	Incumbent	Ireland	The Left	Member of the Committee on the Environment, Public Health and Food Safety	Tenth	

== See also ==
- Committees of the European Parliament
- European Parliament Delegation for relations with South Africa
