= Italian Union of Textile Workers =

Trade union of Italy

The Italian Union of Textile Workers (Italian: Unione Italiana Lavoratori Tessili, UILT) was a trade union representing workers in the textile industry in Italy.

The union was founded in 1950 and held its first conference in 1953. It affiliated to the Italian Union of Labour. By 1965, the union had 48,161 members. In 1969, it merged with the Italian Union of Clothing Workers, to form the Italian Union of Textile and Clothing Workers.
