= Italian Union of Chemical, Energy and Resource Workers =

Trade union of Italy

The Italian Union of Chemical, Energy and Resource Workers (Italian: Unione Italiana Lavoratori Chimica Energia Risorse, UILCER) was a trade union representing manufacturing and utility workers in Italy.

The union was founded in the summer of 1994, when the Italian Union of Chemical and Allied Industries merged with the Italian Union of Oil and Gas Workers. Like both its predecessors, it affiliated to the Italian Union of Labour. From 1995, it was led by Romano Bellissima. On 25 March 1999, it merged with the Italian Union of Public Service Workers, to form the Italian Union of Chemical, Energy and Manufacturing Workers.
