= List of ministers of interior of Cyprus =

This is a list of ministers of internal affairs of the Republic of Cyprus since independence in 1960:

Name	From	To
Polycarpos Georkadjis; Also Defence Minister from 1964.	16 August 1960	1 November 1968
Epameinondas Komodromos ‡	10 December 1968	16 June 1972
Georgios Ioannides ‡	16 June 1972	15 July 1974
Nicos Koshis ‡	8 August 1974	14 January 1975
Christodoulos Veniamin ‡	15 January 1975	6 January 1985
Rois Nicolaides	7 January	31 July 1985
Dinos Michailidis	1 August 1985	27 February 1998
Christodoulos Veniamin	28 February 1988	27 February 1993
Dinos Michailidis	28 February 1993	11 November 1997
Georgios Stavrinakis	12 November 1997	27 February 1998
Dinos Michailidis	28 February 1998	18 March 1999
Christodoulos Christodoulou	19 March 1999	8 May 2002
Georgios Stavrinakis	9 May 2002	28 February 2003
Andreas Christou	3 March 2003	7 September 2006
Neoklis Sylikiotis	8 September 2006	15 July 2007
Christos Patsalides	16 July 2007	29 February 2008
Neoklis Sylikiotis	1 March 2008	20 March 2012
Eleni Mavrou	1 April 2012	28 February 2013
Socratis Hasikos	1 March 2013	10 May 2017
Constantinos Petrides	11 May 2017	3 December 2019
Nicos Nouris	3 December 2019	28 February 2023
Konstantinos Ioannou	1 March 2023	

‡ Also Defence Minister

== See also ==
- Ministry of Interior (Cyprus)
