= Italian Union of Chemical, Energy and Manufacturing Workers =

Trade union of Italy

The Italian Union of Chemical, Energy and Manufacturing Workers (Italian: Unione italiana lavoratori della chimica, energia e manifatturiero, UILCEM) was a trade union representing manufacturing and utility workers in Italy.

The union was founded on 25 March 1999, when the Italian Union of Chemical, Energy and Resource Workers merged with the Italian Union of Public Service Workers. Like both its predecessors, it affiliated to the Italian Union of Labour. In 2013, it merged with the Italian Union of Textile and Clothing Workers, to form the Italian Union of Textile, Energy and Chemical Workers.

== General Secretaries ==
1999: Roman Bellissima
2006: Augusto Pascucci
2012: Carmelo Barbagallo (acting)
