= Dikomo =

Dikomo: Δίκωμο (Greek); Dikmen (Turkish)
- Village
- Location in Cyprus
- Coordinates: 35°16′2″N 33°19′30″E
- Country: Cyprus
  - District: Kyrenia District
- Country (controlled by): Northern Cyprus
  - District: Girne District

Government
  - Type: Municipality
  - Mayor: Yuksel Celebi

Population (2011)
  - Total: 3,969
  - Municipality: 9,120
- Time zone: UTC+2 (EET)
  - Summer (DST): UTC+3 (EEST)
- Website: Turkish Cypriot municipality

Dikomo (Greek: Δίκωμο; Turkish: Dikmen) is a town in Cyprus, located about halfway between Nicosia and Kyrenia. De facto, it is under the control of Northern Cyprus.

The town consists of two parts:

- Kato Dikomo (Κάτω Δίκωμο; Aşağı Dikmen)
- Pano Dikomo (Πάνω Δίκωμο; Yukarı Dikmen)

Dikomo is first mentioned in sources in a chronicle by Neophytos the Recluse on a raid on Cyprus in 1155/56. It was close to the site of a battle between the Byzantine forces and the forces of Raynald of Châtillon, who had landed in Kyrenia and further advanced to Nicosia.

== Famous locals ==
- Dimitris Christofias, former president of Cyprus, born in Dikomo
- Georgios Savvides, AKEL MP 1970–1991, born in Dikomo
- Christodoulos Taramountas, Democratic Rally and European Democracy MP, born in Dikomo

== Churches ==
Prophet Zacharias Church, Saint George Church, Church of the Virgin Mary of the Fields, The Chapel of Saint Dimitris
