= Italian Union of Textile and Clothing Workers =

Trade union of Italy

The Italian Union of Textile and Clothing Workers (Italian: Unione Italiana Lavoratori Tessili e Abbigliamento, UILTA) was a trade union representing workers in the textile and clothing industries in Italy.

The union was founded in 1969, when the Italian Union of Textile Workers merged with the Italian Union of Clothing Workers. Like both its predecessors, it affiliated to the Italian Union of Labour.

By 1997, the union had 42,786 members. In 2013, it merged with the Italian Union of Chemical, Energy and Manufacturing Workers, to form the Italian Union of Textile, Energy and Chemical Workers.
