= Italian Union of Tourism, Commerce and Service Workers =

Trade union of Italy

The Italian Union of Tourism, Commerce and Service Workers (Italian: Unione italiana lavoratori turismo commercio e servizi, UILTuCS) is a trade union representing workers in the service sector in Italy.

The union was founded in 1950, as the Italian Union of Employees of Commercial Companies, on the initiative of Umberto Pagani. It was a founding affiliate of the Italian Labour Union. In 1962, it became the Italian Union of Tourism, Commercial Company and Related Employees, then in 1977 the Italian Union of Hotel, Canteen and Spa Workers merged in, and the union adopted its current name. By 1997, the union claimed 72,313 members.

== General Secretaries ==
1950: Umberto Pagani
Giovanni Gatti
1981: Raffaele Vanni
1998: Bruno Boco
