= Lino Ravecca =

Italian trade unionist and syndicalist

Lino Ravecca (5 April 1920 – 18 March 1999) was an Italian trade unionist and syndicalist.

In 1950 he was one of the founders of Italian Labour Union (UIL) one of the biggest Italian trade union centers. He was general secretary of UIL from 27 October 1969 to 27 October 1971. He was also one of the most important politicians within the Italian Democratic Socialist Party (PSDI) representing this faction within the UIL. He was member of Consiglio Nazionale Economia e Lavoro (CNEL) from 26 January 1977 until his resignation on 31 March 1980.

== See also ==
- Italian Labour Union
