= Italian Union of Farm Owners and Tenants =

Trade union of Italy

The Italian Union of Farm Owners and Tenants (Italian: Unione Italiana Mezzadri e Coltivatori, UIMEC) was a trade union representing people in Italy who worked in the agricultural sector, but were not employees.

The union was founded in 1964, when the Italian Union of Land Workers split into the UIMEC and the Italian Union of Agricultural Labourers and Workers. Like its predecessor, it affiliate to the Italian Labour Union (UIL).

By 1997, the union had 41,419 members. In 2009, it merged with the Italian Union of Agricultural and Food Workers.
