= Pano Dikomo =

Pano Dikomo: Πάνω Δίκωμο (Greek); Yukarı Dikmen (Turkish)
- Village
- Location in Cyprus
- Coordinates: 35°16′41″N 33°19′19″E
- Country (de jure): Cyprus
  - District: Kyrenia District
- Country (de facto): Northern Cyprus
  - District: Girne District
- Time zone: UTC+2 (EET)
  - Summer (DST): UTC+3 (EEST)
- Website: Turkish Cypriot municipality

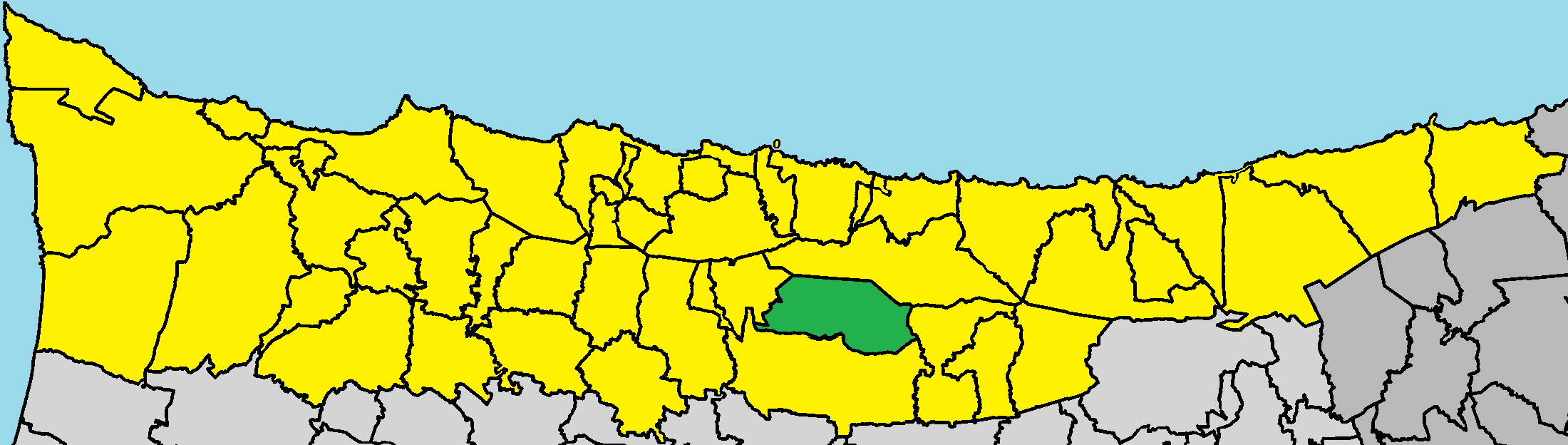
Pano Dikomo in Kyrenia District

Pano Dikomo (Greek: Πάνω Δίκωμο; Turkish: Yukarı Dikmen) is a village in Cyprus, located about halfway between Nicosia and Kyrenia. The village is under the de facto control of Northern Cyprus. According to Northern Cyprus, Pano Dikomo is part of Dikomo.
