= National Federation of Construction, Wood and Related Workers =

Trade union of Italy

FeNEAL
- National Federation of Construction, Wood and Related Workers
- Federazione nazionale lavoratori edili affini e del legno
- Founded: September 1951
- Headquarters: Italy
- Members: 106,467 (as of 1997)
- Key people: Vito Panzarella (General Secretary, since 2014)
- Affiliations: Italian Union of Labour (UIL)
- Website: fenealuil.it

The National Federation of Construction, Wood and Related Workers (Italian: Federazione nazionale lavoratori edili affini e del legno, FeNEAL) is a trade union representing workers in construction, woodworking, forestry, brickmaking and stoneworking.

Although construction workers were among the founders of the Italian Union of Labour (UIL), financial difficulties meant that they were unable to form their own union until September 1951. The National Federation of Construction and Related Workers initially had only 5,040 members, but it had grown to 20,000 by 1953. From 1958, it also represented woodworkers, and adopted its current name.

By 1997, the union had 106,467 members, of whom about 70% worked in construction, 20% in wood manufacturing, and most of the remainder in ceramics and glass.

== General Secretaries ==
1951: Giordano Gattamorta
1960: Luciano Rufino
1976: Giovanni Mucciarelli
1981: Giancarlo Serafini
1989: Francesco Marabottini
2006: Giuseppe Moretti
2010: Antonio Correale
2014: Vito Panzarella
