= Italian Union of Chemical and Allied Industries =

Trade union of Italy

The Italian Union of Chemical and Allied Industries (Italian: Unione Italiana Lavoratori Chimica e Industrie Diverse, UILCID) was a trade union representing workers in the chemical and mining industries in Italy.

The union was founded in 1950, as the Italian Union of Chemical Workers, and was a founding affiliate of the Italian Labour Union. It grew steadily, and by 1953, had 22,006 members. In 1962, it absorbed the National Union of Mine and Quarry Workers, and renamed itself as the "Italian Union of Chemical and Allied Industries", and by 1964, it had 45,237 members.

In the summer of 1994, the union merged with the Italian Union of Oil and Gas Workers, to form the Italian Union of Chemical, Energy and Resource Workers. By 1997, the union had 61,815 members, of whom 70% worked in the chemical industry, and most of the remainder in ceramics and glass.
