= Adamos Adamou =

Cypriot politician

- Αδάμος Αδάμου
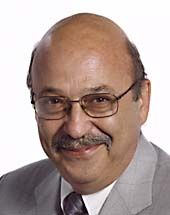
- Official portrait, 2004

President of the House of Representatives
- In office 15 October 2020 – 10 June 2021
- Preceded by: Demetris Syllouris
- Succeeded by: Annita Demetriou

Member of the European Parliament
- In office 2004–2009

Chair of the European Parliament Delegation for relations with Palestine
- In office 20 September 2004 – 14 March 2007
- Preceded by: Luisa Morgantini
- Succeeded by: Kyriacos Triantaphyllides

Personal details
- Born: 30 October 1950 (age 75)
- Party: Progressive Party of Working People
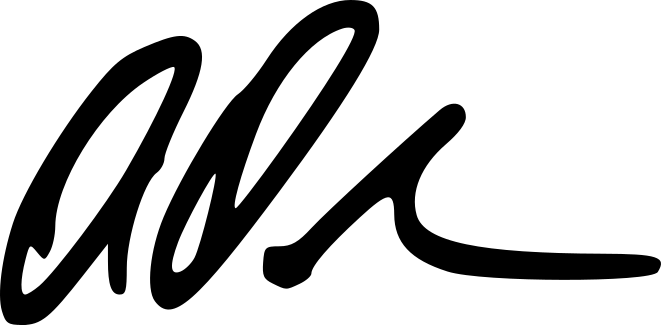
- Signature

Adamos Adamou (Greek: Αδάμος Αδάμου; born 30 October 1950) is a Cypriot politician and former Member of the European Parliament (MEP) for the Progressive Party of Working People, sitting with the European United Left–Nordic Green Left group from 2004 to 2009. He sat on the European Parliament's Committee on the Environment, Public Health and Food Safety. He did not stand for reelection in the 2009 European elections.

== Biography ==
He was the Chairman of the Delegation for relations between the EU and the Palestinian Legislative Council. As a chairman, he is a member of the Conference of Delegation Chairmen. In December 2009, he became Patron of The Friends' Hospice Paphos, a charitable organisation established in 2006, attached to the Evangelismos Hospital in Paphos, Cyprus.

He is also a substitute of the Committee on Culture and Education and of the Delegation to the EU–Chile Joint Parliamentary Committee.

== Education ==
- 1976: Graduate in medicine (Athens)
- 2001: specialised in pathology (1982) and pathological oncology

== Career ==
- 1976–79: Doctor with the Hellenic Anticancer Society
- 1979–84: Specialist doctor and pathologist at Pathology Clinic I of the Hellenic Red Cross Hospital
- 1984–85: Lecturer and deputy director of Pathological Oncology Clinic I of the Agioi Anargyroi Hospital (Athens)
- 1988–98: Deputy director of the Clinical Oncology Department of Nicosia General Hospital
- from 2004: Consultant Oncologist at the Bank of Cyprus Oncology Centre (1998–2003) and at the Medical 'Prevention' Centre
- from 2003: ΑΚΕL-Left – New Powers Member
- Member of the parliamentary Health, Environmental, European Affairs and Audit Committees
- from 1998: Representative of Cyprus in the European Society for Medical Oncology (ESMO)
- Member of the Cyprus Medical Association and chairman of its Bioethics Committee
- Member of the Cyprus Anticancer Association and chairman of its information committee
- Chairman of the Scientific Committee of the Karaiskakio Foundation
- Honourable mention from the Hellenic Breast Cancer Research Society
- Honourable mention and plaque from the Hellenic Psychosocial Oncology Society

== See also ==
- 2004 European Parliament election in Cyprus
