= Lynn Boylan =

Irish politician (born 1976)

Lynn Boylan MEP
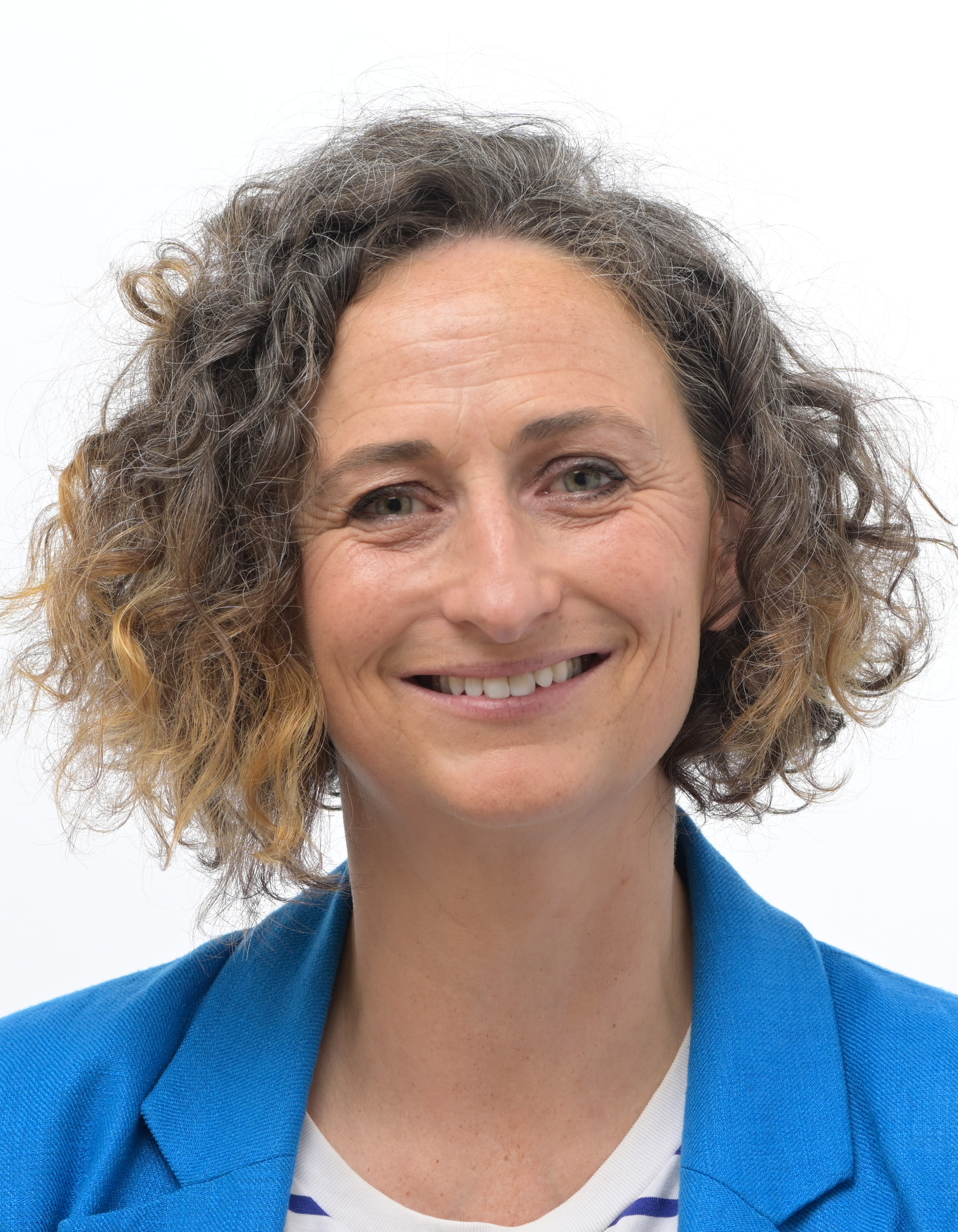
- Boylan in 2024

Member of the European Parliament
- Incumbent
- Assumed office 17 July 2024
- In office 1 July 2014 – 1 July 2019
- Constituency: Dublin

Senator
- In office 29 June 2020 – 17 July 2024
- Succeeded by: Joanne Collins
- Constituency: Agricultural Panel

Chair of the European Parliament Delegation for relations with Palestine
- Incumbent
- Assumed office 1 October 2024
- Preceded by: Manu Pineda

Personal details
- Born: 29 November 1976 (age 49) Tallaght, Dublin, Ireland
- Party: Ireland: Sinn Féin; EP: The Left
- Domestic partner: Eoin Ó Broin
- Education: University College Dublin
- Website: lynnboylan.ie

Lynn Boylan (Irish: Lynn Ní Bhaoighealláin; born 29 November 1976) is an Irish Sinn Féin politician who has been a Member of the European Parliament (MEP) from Ireland for Dublin since July 2024. She was previously an MEP for Dublin from 2014 to 2019. From 2020 to 2024, she was a Senator for the Agricultural Panel.

== Early life ==
Boylan was born in Dublin on 29 November 1976, and grew up in the Kilnamanagh area of Tallaght. Initially studying journalism and gaining a certificate, she went on to earn post-graduate qualifications from University College Dublin in Environmental Impact Assessment and European Environmental Conservation Management.

== Career ==
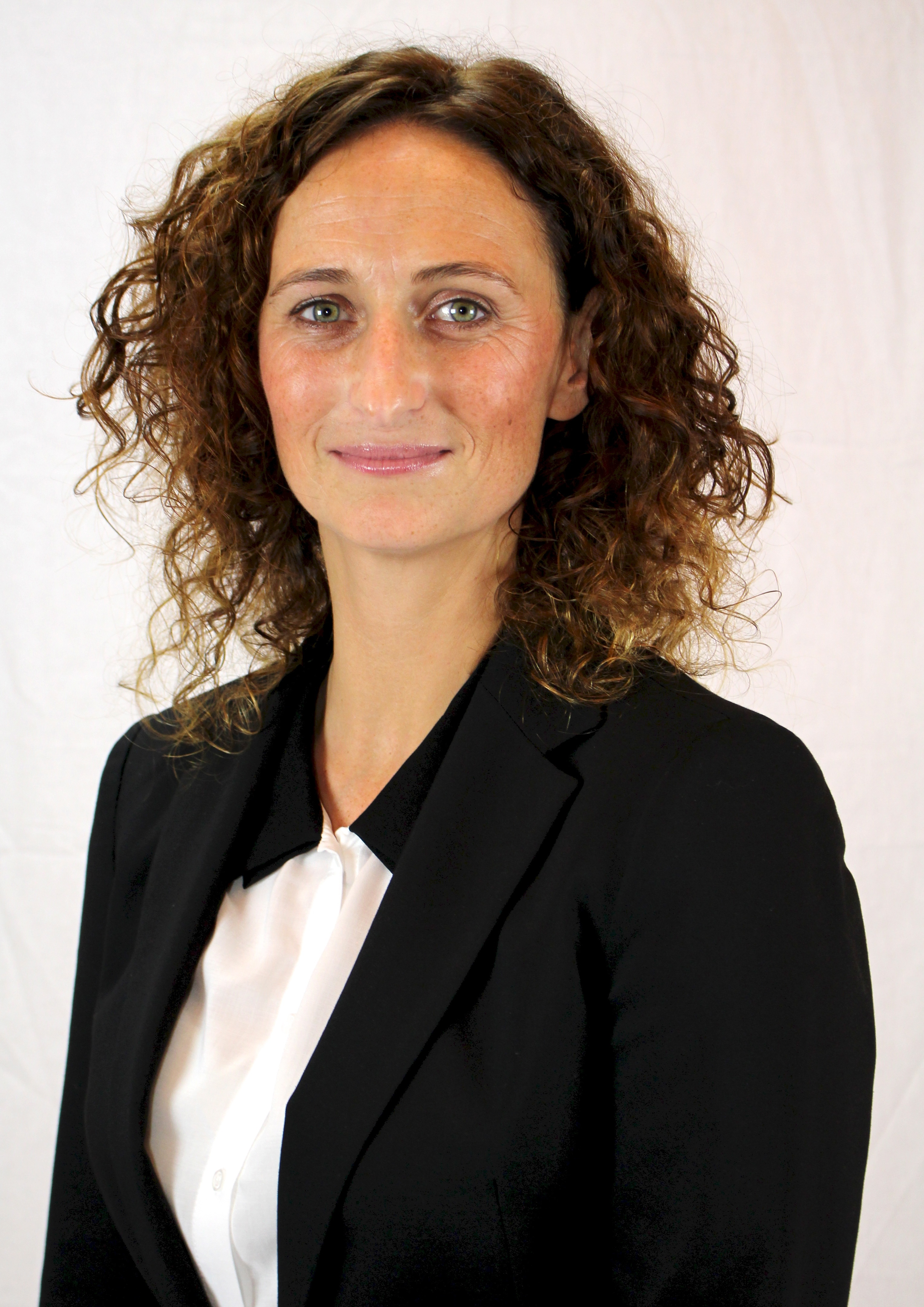
Boylan in 2013

In 2005, Boylan moved to County Kerry while working as a coordinator for the Irish Wildlife Trust at Killarney National Park. That same year she joined Sinn Féin.

Under her Irish-language name, Lynn Ní Bhaoighealláin, she stood at the 2007 general election as the Sinn Féin candidate in Kerry South. With only 3.5% of the first-preference votes, she was eliminated on the first count. At the 2009 Kerry County Council election, she stood for the local electoral area of Killarney, but was again unsuccessful. She attributed her defeats to being an outsider: "As a Dub in Kerry the odds were stacked against me", she told The Irish Times in 2014.

Boylan returned to Dublin in 2011 to work in Ballymun, for the Global Action Plan, an environmental initiative funded by Ballymun Regeneration. In 2010, she was appointed as chair of the advisory board of Safefood.

=== MEP: 2014–2019 ===
In September 2013, Boylan was selected as the Sinn Féin candidate for Dublin at the 2014 European Parliament election. She left her job, and as a candidate was paid a wage by Sinn Féin during the campaign. Boylan began her campaign "practically anonymous", according to Sinn Féin president Gerry Adams. By April, Boylan was still described by the Irish Independent newspaper as a "political unknown". In the election on 23 May, Boylan won 23.6% of the first preference vote, and was elected on the third count.

Boylan was a campaigner for the release of Ibrahim Halawa, an Irish citizen from Firhouse in South Dublin who was imprisoned in Egypt between 2013 and 2017 and was adopted by Amnesty International as a prisoner of conscience. In March 2015, Boylan described Halawa as an "Irish-speaking, GAA-playing Dublin lad", and asked if the Irish Government would do more if his name was "Paddy Murphy". In December 2015, Boylan sponsored a motion in the European Parliament calling for Halawa's release. She introduced his two sisters to the Parliament before the vote, which passed by over 560 votes to 11.

She lost her seat at the 2019 European Parliament election.

=== Senator: 2020–2024 ===
In April 2020 Boylan was elected at the 2020 Seanad election to the 26th Seanad on the Agricultural Panel. She was the Sinn Féin candidate at the 2021 Dublin Bay South by-election. She was not elected, getting 4,245 first-preference votes (15.8%).

=== MEP: 2024–present ===
In December 2023, Boylan was selected to contest the 2024 European Parliament election, alongside Daithí Doolan. On 11 June 2024, Boylan was elected to the European Parliament as MEP for Dublin, taking the third seat of four. She took office on 17 July 2024.

In 2025, the Israeli Interior Ministry barred Boylan and Rima Hassan, an MEP for France, from entering during a diplomatic EU mission to Jerusalem and Ramallah, leading to the cancellation of the trip.

In 2026, at an EU Foreign Affairs Committee meeting Boylan inaccurately stated, "It is unfortunate that we can't use our own language in this committee", in reference to a perceived lack of Irish language translators. When corrected that the European Union had provided Irish translators, Boylan resumed her speech in English, stating "we didn't know, sorry. So I'll continue in English because I wasn't prepared".

== Personal life ==
Boylan is the partner of Eoin Ó Broin, who has been the Sinn Féin TD for Dublin Mid-West since 2016. They live in Clondalkin, County Dublin.
