= Italian Union of Bank, Insurance and Tax Workers =

Trade union of Italy

UILCA Credito Esattorie e Assicurazioni
- Italian Labour Union Banks Collector's offices and Insurances
- UIL Credito Esattorie e Assicurazioni
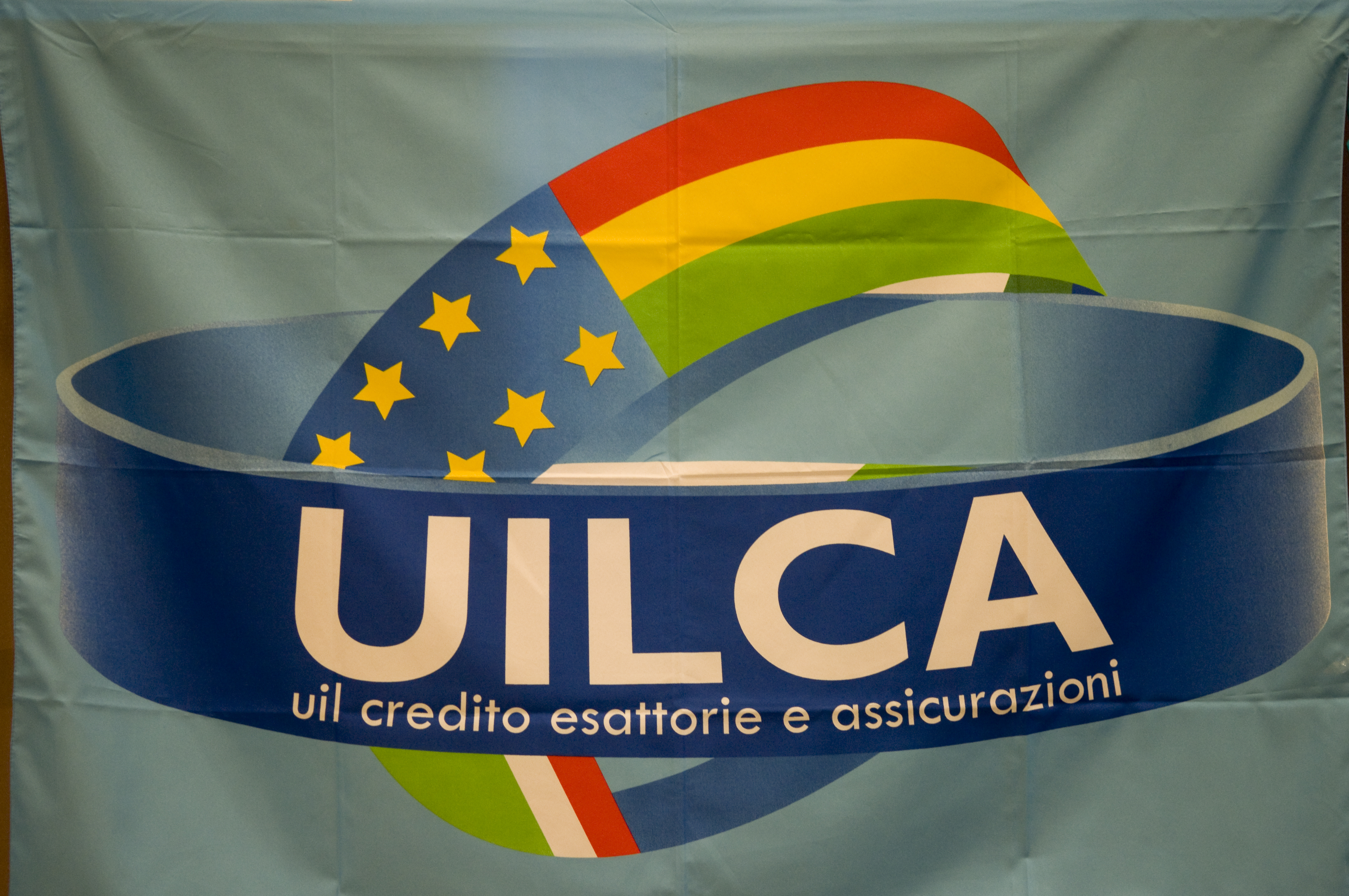
- Founded: 1998
- Headquarters: Rome, Italy.
- Location: Italy
- Members: 43.957(2011)
- Key people: Massimo Masi, General Secretary
- Affiliations: Italian Labour Union (UIL)
- Website: (in Italian) uilca.it

The UIL Credito Esattorie e Assicurazioni or UILCA is an Italian banks insurances and tax collectors workers' trade union affiliated to the Italian Labour Union (UIL).

== History ==
UILCA was born in January 1998 from the merge of two trade unions affiliated to UIL: Unione Italiana Bancari (UIB) and UIL Assicurazioni (UILASS). In April 2000 also the Federazione Italiana Lavoratori Esattoriali (FILE) joined the union.

== Affiliations ==
It is a member of UNI Global Union.

== General secretaries ==
- Elio Porino from 1982 to 2008
- Massimo Masi from 2008

== Members ==
Last data available referred to year 2011 and indicate 43.957 members geographically distributed as follows:24.862 north Italy, 10.067 center Italy and 9.028 southern Italy. When a member retires became member of UIL Pensionati.

== See also ==
- UIL
- List of trade unions in Italy
