= Lellos Demetriades =

Cypriot politician (1933–2022)

Mayor of Nicosia Municipality
- In office December 1971 – 31 December 2001
- Preceded by: Odysseas Ioannides
- Succeeded by: Michael Zampelas

Member of the House of Representatives of Cyprus
- In office 16 August 1960 – 15 July 1970
- Constituency: Nicosia constituency

Personal details
- Born: 3 February 1933 Nicosia, British Cyprus
- Died: 9 April 2022 (aged 89)
- Citizenship: Cypriot
- Party: Patriotic Front

Lellos Demetriades (Greek: Λέλλος Δημητριάδης; 3 February 1933 – 9 April 2022) was a Cypriot politician. A member of the Patriotic Front, he served as mayor of Nicosia Municipality from 1971 to 2001. He died on 9 April 2022.
