= The Global Campaign to Return to Palestine =

Umbrella organization for NGOs in support of the Palestinian cause

Campaign's Official Logo

The Global Campaign to Return to Palestine (Arabic: الحملة العالمية للعودة إلى فلسطين) is an umbrella organization for NGOs that support the Palestinian cause, both in the Arab region and the world, and has representatives and partners in over 45 countries around the world to set up events and movements to advocate the Palestinian cause and specially the right of return.

== About The Campaign ==
From the campaign’s perspective, the commemoration of the occasions currently derives its importance from the dangerous reality facing the "cause" and affecting it in its core, in a time where the Arab and Islamic concerns have drifted away from the Zionist plans that continue to rob the Palestinians of their rights day after day.

The Campaign has partners and members in over 45 countries around the world including: Palestine, Lebanon, Jordan, Syria, Yemen, Malaysia, Indonesia, Tunisia, Morocco, Egypt, Scotland, United States, Canada, Venezuela, Chile, Nigeria, Albania and others; and organizes movements and events in support of the Palestinian Cause, with a special focus on the right of return. Therefore, it has chosen the"Day of Return" (aka An-Nakba day), on May 15 of each year, as a central occasion to commemorate on the largest scale possible.

The Campaign held its first preparatory meeting between 14 and 16 April 2013, for initiating the commemoration of the Day of Return, 2013.

In its organized activities, the campaign tends to depend on personal initiatives and civil society organizations, as well as young volunteers in an attempt to envelop, and properly direct, the enormous energy youngsters hold in the domain of activism for Palestine.

== Objectives ==
1- Retrieving the Palestinian cause as a central unifying issue.

2- Attracting the utmost possible number of NGOs to join the umbrella organization, in an attempt to harmonize the movements and magnify their effectiveness worldwide.

3- Emphasizing the right of the Palestinian people to return to their homeland.

4- Confirming the right of return as an indisputable claim in the global awareness and standing up against all the attempts that intend to mislay or weaken this right.

== Establishment ==
An event organized by the Campaign on the "Day of Return", 2013

The Global Campaign to Return to Palestine was officially established on the Day of Return, on 15 May 2013, though it had been operating long before. More than 45 events were arranged around the world in affiliation with international NGOs that support the Palestinian Cause. The Campaign issued a statement of establishment and the statement was signed by all participating NGOs' representatives.

== Activities ==
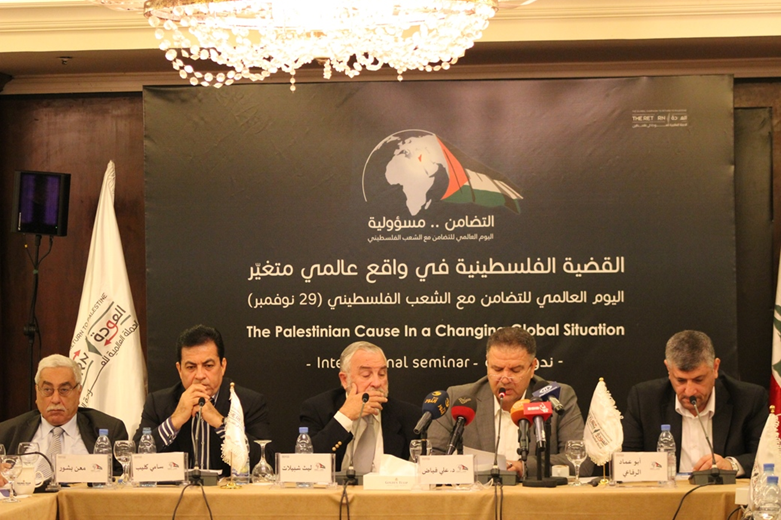
The International Day of Solidarity with the Palestinian People Conference, held by the Campaign in Beirut Lebanon, in November 2014

=== The International Day of Solidarity with the Palestinian People Conference, 2013 ===
Out of the Campaign’s sincere belief in the importance of communication and cooperation among NGOs that support the Palestinian Cause, and in the light of the need for an umbrella organization that facilitates and guarantees such cooperation, the Campaign set up a conference in Beirut, Lebanon, on the Solidarity Day on the 27th, 28th, 29th, of November, 2013. The Conference attracted more than 45 guests from around the world, mostly representatives of international NGOs working for the Palestinian Cause, and was concluded by the establishment of an umbrella organization with the membership of all those present.

=== The day of Return, 2014 ===
"Destination Palestine" Poster Designs, displayed on Billboards in several countries on the "Day of Return", 2014

The Global Campaign to Return to Palestine has chosen 15 May as a central occasion to commemorate each year under the name "The Day of Return". On this day the Campaign evokes the Palestinian catastrophe (An-Nakba 1948) and what have occurred during it; the horrible massacres, the oppression and persecution of Palestinians, and the land confiscations which resulted in the displacement of more than 840000 Palestinians from their homeland (out of 1.4 million Palestinians at that time).

Events, conferences, protests, and movements were organized in affiliation with our friends and sister organizations around the world for the commemoration of the "Day of Return". The Campaign’s main focus was on the replacement of the term "Nakba" (catastrophe) by "Day of Return" in an attempt to build a new approach for the occasion that is rather optimistic and triumphant than tragic.

The Campaign also organized a ‘promotional campaign’ within which flashes about the "Nakba" and return were filmed and distributed to TV channels in several languages, in addition to posters that were displayed on billboards in different countries and languages.
