= Michael Zampelas =

Cypriot businessman, politician, and philanthropist (1937–2019)

Michael Herodotou Zampelas (19 March 1937 – 15 May 2019) was a Cypriot businessman, politician and philanthropist.

== Career ==
Zampelas was born in Cyprus in 1937, received an education in the United Kingdom, and became a chartered accountant in 1965.

In 1970, together with his associates, he established Coopers & Lybrand, an accounting and consulting firm in Cyprus and Athens. As a result of a merger in 1998, the firm was renamed PricewaterhouseCoopers. He served as an elected member of the board of the European Organisation of Coopers & Lybrand Europe (1991-1999). Michael Zampelas served the firm as its Chairman and Chief Executive Officer from its establishment in 1970 until 2001 and as a non-executive Chairman from 2002 until 2005. Today, PricewaterhouseCoopers in Cyprus employs around 1000 partners and staff. It is the leading professional services firm on the island, providing industry-focused assurance, tax, advisory services, global compliance for public and private clients.

He was the Honorary Consul General of Estonia in Cyprus, beginning in 1997. He contributed substantially to the development of the commercial and cultural relations between the two countries. The President of Estonia awarded him the title of the Order of the National Coat of Arms.

As an independent candidate, Zampelas won the municipal elections and took office as the Mayor of Nicosia, the capital of Cyprus, on 1 January 2002. He served as Mayor until 31 December 2006. In 2007 he was honored by the next Mayor and the Municipal Council for his services as Mayor and he was awarded the honorary medal of the city of Nicosia.

Parallel with his professional activities, Zampelas engaged in efforts to promote Cyprus internationally, focusing on the financial rebuild and development of the country.

Zampelas was actively promoting Cyprus through the extensive network of PricewaterhouseCoopers worldwide and through his connections with large banking and financial organisations, law firms and other offices abroad by delivering presentations at seminars and meetings in various countries and by giving interviews in the international media. A count of around 160 such presentations all over the world was recorded in a period of 20 years.

Zampleas was one of the initiators who contributed greatly to the enhancement of the image of the accounting profession in Cyprus which is now considered by international experts as equal to that of the United Kingdom, United States and other developed countries. In 2007 he was honored by the board of The Institute of Certified Public Accountants of Cyprus for his visionary services to the accounting and auditing profession in Cyprus and in 2010 he was awarded by the same institute the first prize for his contribution in the development of the accounting and auditing profession and the economy of Cyprus.

His social contribution to the educational, cultural, community and business levels has been continuous. He was honoured and decorated by a number of social and business institutions. He served as president or member of the board of many social institutions and business organisations.

=== Served positions throughout his career ===
A number of positions in institutions and organisations are shown below.

==== Social institutions ====
- Current president of the Association of the Friends Christou Steliou Ioannou Foundation - for children with special needs
- President of the Cyprus Foundation for Muscular Dystrophy Research – People with muscular dystrophy
- President of the Institute of Neurology and Genetics – Bi-communal research and medical centre
- Member of the board of the Lions Care for Youth Foundation-helping youth in need
- Member of the board of Old Peoples Home – Archangelos Michael
- Member of the board of Boy Scouts Organisation in Cyprus
- President of Achilleas Kaimakliou Athletic Organisation

==== Business organisations ====
- President of the Cyprus Russian Business Association
- Member of the board of the Nicosia Chamber of Commerce and Industry
- Member of board of The Cyprus Employers Organisation
- President of the Institute of Certified Public Accountants of Cyprus
- President of the Cyprus Port Authority
- President of the Cyprus Forest Industries
- President of the Union of Municipalities in Cyprus
- President of the Nicosia Sewerage Board
- President of the Kofinou Slaughter House
- Current vice chairman of the Eurobank Cyprus Ltd and former chairman of its Audit Committee.
- Current member of the board of directors of Globaltans Investment Plc, a company quoted in the London Stock Exchange and former chairman of its Audit Committee.
- Member of the board of Arricano Real EstatePlc, a company quoted in the London Stock Exchange and chairman of its Audit Committee

==== Other ====
- Loan Commissioner of the Government of Cyprus
- Member of a number of Commissions of Enquiry

== Personal life ==
He was married to Loukia, and had three daughters. Loukia Zampelas is also very actively involved in the community and with public issues.

They were collectors of art and played a very important role in promoting Cypriot Art. In 1999, Michael Zampelas founded the company Zampelas Art with the purpose of establishing a complete Art Centre for the promotion of art and culture in Cyprus and abroad.

The company has created the Loukia and Michael Zampelas Art Museum, a non-profit private organisation, which houses the permanent collection of the Zampelas family and also organises temporary exhibitions of artists from Cyprus and abroad. Furthermore, other art-related ventures were created, under the brand name Zmart. These are: Zmart Education, Zmart Gallery, Zmart Shop, Zmart Café and Zmart Framing.

Political offices
| Preceded by Lellos Demetriades | Mayor of Nicosia; 2002–2006 | Succeeded by Eleni Mavrou |
