= Confederazione dei Comitati di Base =

Cobas
- Confederazione dei Comitati di Base
- Headquarters: Rome, Italy
- Location: Italy
- Website: www.cobas.it

The Confederazione dei Comitati di Base (Cobas) is a rank and file trade union center in Italy. It was formed in the late 1980s by members who were dissatisfied with the leadership of the three main Italian confederations (CGIL, CISL and UIL). Many of its members see it as syndicalist, but it has also courted the Trotskyist group, the League for the Fifth International with whom it shared a platform at the anti-G8 protests in Rostock in 2007.

Cobas regard themselves as rank and file unions in contrast to the traditional, hierarchical unions that impose compromises on their members. Comparable "rank and file" labor unions exist in France: the Fédération Syndicale Unitaire (FSU), and the Solidaires Unitaires Démocratiques (SUD) and their confederation in the Group of 10.

== History ==
The factory councils became more and more popular during the 1970s, and their co-existence with the traditional unions increased unionization. In 1978, the mainstream unions recentralised power to prevent rank-and-file practices and rules outside of their control.
