= Italian Union of Metalworkers =

Trade union of Italy

The Italian Union of Metalworkers (Italian: Unione Italiana Lavoratori Metalmeccanici, UILM) is a trade union representing metalworkers in Italy.

The union was founded on 5 March 1950 and was a founding affiliate of the Italian Labour Union (UIL). Its leading figure was Arturo Chiari who, like most of the members, had previously been active in the Italian Federation of Metalworkers. By the end of the year, it claimed 400,000 members, being particularly strong at the FIAT factory in Turin, although by 1997, this had fallen to 100,453. Other general secretaries have included Giorgio Benvenuto and Luigi Angeletti.
