= Italian Labour Union =

National trade union centre in Italy

UIL
- Italian Labour Union
- Unione Italiana del Lavoro
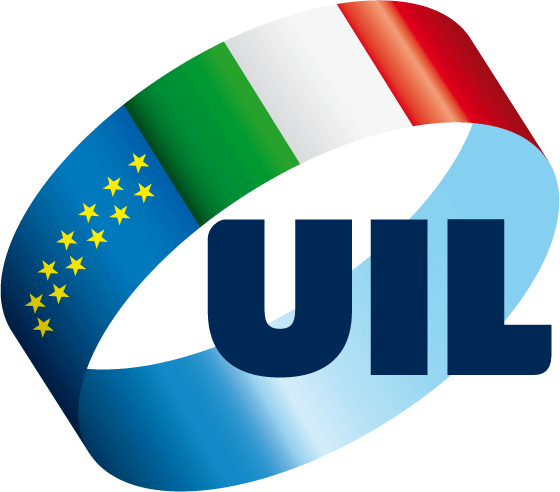
- Founded: 1950
- Headquarters: Rome, Italy
- Location: Italy
- Members: 2,196,442 (2011)
- Key people: Pierpaolo Bombardieri, General Secretary
- Affiliations: ITUC, ETUC, TUAC
- Website: uil.it

The Italian Labour Union (Italian: Unione Italiana del Lavoro, pronounced [uˈnjoːne itaˈljaːna del laˈvoːro]; UIL [uˈil, wil]) is a national trade union centre in Italy. It was founded in 1950 as a socialist, social democratic, republican, and laic split from the Italian General Confederation of Labour (CGIL). It represents almost 2.2 million workers.

The UIL is affiliated with the International Trade Union Confederation (ITUC), and the European Trade Union Confederation (ETUC).

== Background ==
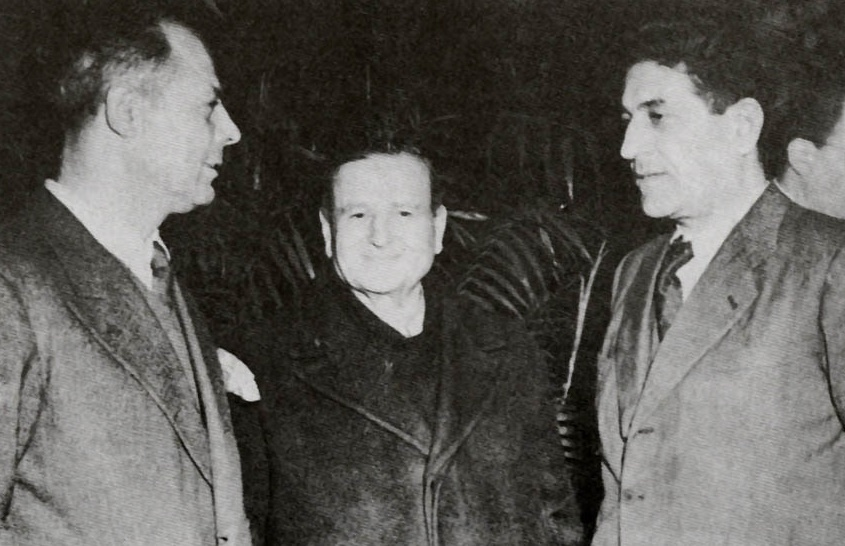
The three CGIL leaders, Lizzardi, Grandi and Di Vittorio, in 1945.

On June 3, 1944, while Italy was involved in World War II, party leaders Giuseppe Di Vittorio, Achille Grandi, and Emilio Canevari signed the "Pact of Rome" on behalf of Italian Communist Party (PCI), Christian Democracy, and PSI respectively. The resulting association, known as the "United CGIL", was established to unify all the Italian workers under one banner, without regard to their political and religious views. It was the culmination of cooperative efforts by all the anti-fascist parties included in the National Liberation Committee. The pact united the three leading political movements (communist, socialist, and Catholic) in the name of workers' rights and the ongoing fight against fascism.

== History ==
The formation of the UIL was the result of a split in the "United CGIL" pact, which was in turn induced by turbulence within the associated Italian political parties in the early post-war years, especially the tumult within the Italian Socialist Party (PSI).

=== Split from CGIL ===
The first general election of the Italian Republic was held on 18 April 1948. As a result, Socialist Unity—the political alliance formed by the Italian Democratic Socialist Party (PDSI) and reform socialists in union with Italian Republican Party (PRI)—received 7.07% of the vote for the Italian Chamber of Deputies and 3.62% for the Italian Senate. They thus participated in the 5th cabinet of Alcide De Gasperi, providing two ministers.

For the first time, the Social Democrats and Moderate Socialists entered government, while the PCI and the PSI joined the opposition. The CGIL initially attempted to strengthen links with the PCI, but later called for a general strike against the De Gasperi cabinet following the shooting of PCI general secretary Palmiro Togliatti, in an attack on 14 July 1948.

Unwilling to continue cooperation with increasingly militant socialists, on 15 September 1948, a group of Catholic trade unionists, consisting of Republicans and Social Democrats, split from CGIL. They founded a new union initially called the "Free CGIL" (Libera CGIL, LCIGL) and later named the Italian Confederation of Workers' Trade Unions (CISL). CGIL remained the union of the communists and socialists, as well as the laic and reform factions.

Said laic and reform factions were mainly associated with the Italian Liberal Party (PLI), other Republicans, Social Democrats and some autonomous socialists affiliated with the PSI faction led by Giuseppe Romita. These factions remained in the CIGL after the Catholic split, but the increasing political militancy of CGIL strikes, including actions against Italian membership in NATO, and the violence of 17 May 1949 in Molinella pushed the non-communist groups to also split with the CGIL and form the Italian Labor Federation (FIL).

=== The Italian Labor Federation (FIL) ===
On 4 June 1949, at the Liceo Visconti in Rome, Republicans and Social Democrats founded the FIL.

In the same summer of 1949, some trade unionists of the autonomous socialist faction, led by Italo Viglianesi, split from the CGIL, following the example of autonomous socialists led by Romita, who had left the PSI and founded the Unitary Socialist Party (PSU) in December 1949. Attempts by Viglianesi’s group to join the FIL were blocked by the FIL leadership, as they were considering, under American pressure, merging with the Catholic LCGIL. The American embassy and the American Federation of Labor saw establishing a single, unified, non-communist trade union, to oppose the communist CGIL, as being in their interest.

The first and only FIL congress was held from 29 January to 5 February 1950 in Naples. The primary object of this meeting was to arrange the merger with LCIGL, but the decision was immediately controversial. Objections were made on both procedural grounds, (the decision had been made by FIL executives without any public voting), and on political grounds (many wanted the FIL to be independent from both Catholic and American influence). The Italian Republican Party and United Socialist Party had already urged their supporters in the FIL to oppose this merger.

In the end, only the FIL leadership joined the LCIGL (which changed its name to the Italian Confederation of Workers' Trade Unions on April 30, 1950). The bulk of the rank and file membership resolved decided to form a new union, independent from the politics and foreign influence which had sundered the CGIL and FIL.

On 5 February 1950, at the end of the congress, the FIL ceased to exist.

=== Formation of the Italian Labor Union (UIL) ===
On 5 March 1950, in the Casa dell'Aviatore (Aviator House) in Rome, 253 delegates from the now defunct FIL congress participated in the foundation of the Italian Labour Union (UIL). Despite claims to political independence, the new organization was strongly social democratic and reformist in character. The assembly president was senator Luigi Carmagnola. Other notable attendees included Italo Viglianesi, Enzo Dalla Chiesa and Renato Bulleri of the PSU; Raffaele Vanni, Amedeo Sommovigo and the former Prime Minister Ferruccio Parri, all of the PRI; several trade unionists from the PSLI; and other independent trade unionists.

The founding declaration and program approved by delegates included the UIL five founding pilasters:

- Independence from parties, from government, and from religions.
- Development of the autonomy of sectoral trade unions.
- Adoption of democratic methods via the active participation of workers in the UIL decisions.
- Tight coordination with the other two trade union confederation: CGIL and CISL.
- Intervention in any social, economic and political questions concerning workers interests.

A later addition to the declaration was a commitment towards the Mezzogiorno.

Due in part to resisting American interests by refusing to merge with the LCIGL, the union was denied political partnership and funding for several years. Despite these difficulties, in the first years the UIL consistently increased its influence among Italian workers, reaching 400,000 members by the end of 1950.

On January 1, 1952, the UIL became a member of the International Confederation of Free Trade Unions, which later, in 2006, merged into the International Trade Union Confederation (ITUC). In 1973 the UIL became a member of the European Trade Union Confederation (ETUC).

On 6 December 1953 the second UIL congress was held in Rome.

=== The CGIL-CISL-UIL Federation ===
Between 1968 and the early 1980's, left-wing CGIL, Catholic CISL and moderate-left UIL united, setting up the "CGIL-CISL-UIL Federation", a federation to coordinate (but not merge) these three major unions. The federation was similar in nature to the unified "Old" CGIL, but it did not attach members to potentially unwelcome political commitments. This federation only managed to effectively function from its foundation until the early 1970's, most obviously during Italy's Hot Autumn of labor unrest.

The federation came to an end in 1985 when a law issued by the Bettino Craxi cabinet divided the member unions. The law cut the "sliding wage scale". While differences over the law were initially papered over, these conflicts entered the public sphere when the parties of Craxi's cabinet, (DC, PSI, PSDI, PRI, PLI), launched a concerted political effort to defend the law against a proposed referendum to overturn it. The PCI, led by Enrico Berlinguer, and the CGIL, led by Luciano Lama, supported the call for a referendum on the law. The CISL and UIL, led by Pierre Carniti and Giorgio Benvenuto, and factions within the CGIL (especially those influenced by Ottaviano Del Turco) aligned themselves with the government's position against a referendum. The referendum did not materialize, and the passage of the new law led to the break-up of the CGIL-CISL-UIL Federation.

=== Seconda Repubblica ===
Beginning in 1989 and continuing into the 1990's, Italy's traditional political parties were largely dissolved in a period of heightened national turbulence. In the wake of this political revolution, the UIL became politically untethered, losing its connections with the PSDI, PLI, PRI and moderate PSI. UIL members no longer have a strong, shared political identity, although many are affiliated with the modern Socialist Party and the Democratic Party.

In 2011, according to the most recent official data, there were 2,196,442 total UIL members, with 1,328,583 active workers, 575,266 retired workers and 292,593 second membership workers.

== General secretaries ==
Years	Name	Party
1953–1969	Italo Viglianesi	PSDI
1969–1971	Lino Ravecca	PSDI
1969–1971	Ruggero Ravenna	PSI
1969–1976	Raffaele Vanni	PRI
1976–1992	Giorgio Benvenuto	PSI
1992–2000	Pietro Larizza	PSI/DS
2000–2014	Luigi Angeletti	DS/PD
2014–2020	Carmelo Barbagallo	PSI
2020–	Pierpaolo Bombardieri	Ind.

== Affiliated union federations ==
=== Current affiliates ===
The list of affiliated federation includes at present the following:

Union	Abbreviation	Founded	Membership (2013)
Italian Union of Agricultural and Food Workers	UILA	1994	225,940
Italian Union of Bank, Insurance and Tax Workers	UILCA	1998	44,061
Italian Union of Communication Workers	UILCOM	2002	40,937
Italian Union of Local Authority Workers	UILFPL	2000	204,964
Italian Union of Metalworkers	UILM	1950	90,438
Italian Union of Workers in Constitutional Bodies	UIL OO.CC.	1978	
Italian Union of Public Administration Workers	UILPA	1998	
Italian Union of Research, University, and Higher Art and Musical Education Workers	UILRUA		
Italian Union of Retired Workers	UIL Pensionati	1951	573,091
Italian Union of Postal Workers	UIL POSTE	1950	29,540
Italian Union of School Workers	UIL SCUOLA	1961	
Italian Union of Textiles, Energy and Chemicals	UILTEC	2013	109,359
Italian Union of Transport Workers	UILT	1983	117,846
Italian Union of Temporary Workers	UIL Tem.p@	1998	70,528
Italian Union of Tourism, Commerce and Service Workers	UILTuCS	1950	120,000
National Federation of Construction, Wood and Related Workers	FeNEAL	1951	151,131

=== Former affiliates ===
Union	Abbreviation	Founded	Left	Reason not affiliated	Membership (1964)
Italian Federation of Airline Workers	UILGeA		1983	Merged into UILT	774
Italian Federation of Printers and Paper Workers	FILAGC	1957		Merged into UILSIC	11,184
Italian Federation of Tax Collectors	FILE		2000	Merged into UILCA	
Italian Union of Accordion Workers	UIL-FISAR				
Italian Union of Agricultural Labourers and Workers	UISBA	1964	1994	Merged into UILA	N/A
Italian Union of Bank Employees	UIB	1954	1998	Merged into UILCA	6,503
Italian Union of Chemical and Allied Industries	UILCID	1950	1994	Merged into UILCER	45,237
Italian Union of Chemical, Energy and Manufacturing Workers	UILCEM	1999	2013	Merged into UILTEC	N/A
Italian Union of Chemical, Energy and Resource Workers	UILCER	1994	1999	Merged into UILCEM	N/A
Italian Union of Clothing Workers	UILA	1953	1969	Merged into UILTA	44,278
Italian Union of Commerce and Sales Workers			2007	Merged into UILA	
Italian Union of Entertainment Workers	UIL Spettacolo	1963		Merged into UILSIC	10,020
Italian Union of Farm Owners and Tenants	UIMEC	1964	2009	Merged into UILA	N/A
Italian Union of Finance Workers	UILF	1962			
Italian Union of Fine Artists	USAIBA	1957		Merged into UILSIC	N/A
Italian Union of Food Industry Workers	UILIA	1953	1994	Merged into UILA	42,241
Italian Union of Hospital Workers	UIL SANITA	1950	2000	Merged into UILFPL	
Italian Union of Hotel and Restaurant Workers	UILAMT		1977	Merged into UILTuCS	22,461
Italian Union of Insurance Workers	UILAS		1998	Merged into UILCA	12,828
Italian Union of Land Workers	UIL-TERRA	1950	1964	Split into UISBA and UIMEC	488,697
Italian Union of Maritime Workers	UIM	1954	1983	Merged into UILT	33,128
Italian Union of Monopoly Workers	UIL Monopoli	1953	2004	Dissolved	
Italian Union of Oil and Gas Workers	UILPEM	1957	1994	Merged into UILCER	N/A
Italian Union of Port and Allied Workers	UIL-PORT		1962	Merged into UILTATEP	N/A
Italian Union of Press, Entertainment, Information and Cultural Workers	UILSIC		2002	Merged into UILCOM	
Italian Union of Public Office Workers	UILPI				115,825
Italian Union of Public Service Workers	UILSP	1962	1999	Merged into UILCEM	13,295
Italian Union of Railway Workers	SIUF	1956	1983	Merged into UILT	16,400
Italian Union of Research Workers			1991	Merged into UILFUR	N/A
Italian Union of State Workers	UILSTAT		1998	Merged into UILPA	
Italian Union of Telecommunication Workers	UILTe	1959	2002	Merged into UILCOM	
Italian Union of Textile Workers	UILT	1950	1969	Merged into UILTA	48,161
Italian Union of Textile and Clothing Workers	UILTA	1969	2013	Merged into UILTEC	N/A
Italian Union of Transport Auxiliaries and Port Workers	UILTATEP	1951	1983	Merged into UILT	134,280
Italian Union of University Workers			1991	Merged into UILFUR	N/A
National Federation of Local Transport and Inland Waterways	FNAI	1952	1983	Merged into UILT	
National Federation of Quasi-Government Agencies	FNP	1958			
National Society for Training Professional Teachers	ENFAP				
National Union of Communal Labour Office Employees					
National Union of Labour Inspectorate Personnel	UIL-SNAPIL				
National Union of Lottery Officials	UIL-Lottisti				
National Union of Local Authority Employees	UNDEL	1953	2000	Merged into UILFPL	66,259
National Union of Metric Inspectors					
National Union of Mine and Quarry Workers	UILMEC	1950	1962	Merged into UILCID	N/A
Union of Receptionist and Secretaries of Judicial Offices					
University and Research Federation	UILFUR	1991	1998	Merged into UILPA	N/A

== See also ==
- Italian General Confederation of Labour
- Italian Confederation of Workers' Trade Unions
