= Kato Dikomo =

Kato Dikomo: Κάτω Δίκωμο (Greek); Aşağı Dikmen (Turkish)
- Village
- Location in Cyprus
- Coordinates: 35°16′0″N 33°19′20″E
- Country (de jure): Cyprus
  - District: Kyrenia District
- Country (de facto): Northern Cyprus
  - District: Girne District

Population
- 9,120
- Time zone: UTC+2 (EET)
  - Summer (DST): UTC+3 (EEST)
- Website: Turkish Cypriot municipality

Kato Dikomo (Greek: Κάτω Δίκωμο; Turkish: Aşağı Dikmen) is a village in Cyprus, located about halfway between Nicosia and Kyrenia. De facto, it is under the control of Northern Cyprus. According to Northern Cyprus, Kato Dikomo is part of Dikomo.

== Notable people ==
- Dimitris Christofias, former president of Cyprus, born in Kato Dikomo
- Georgios Savvides, AKEL MP 1970–1991, born in Kato Dikomo
- Christodoulos Taramountas, Democratic Rally and European Democracy MP, born in Kato Dikomo
