= Skevi Koukouma Koutra =

Cypriot politician (born 1954)

- Σκεύη Κουκουμά Κούτρα

Member of the House of Representatives of Cyprus
- In office March 2008 – 2021

Personal details
- Born: 18 July 1954 (age 71) Avgorou, Famagusta District, Cyprus
- Party: AKEL
- Occupation: Politician

Skevi Koukouma Koutra (Greek: Σκεύη Κουκουμά Κούτρα; born 18 July 1954) is a Cypriot politician who served as a member of the House of Representatives of Cyprus from 2008 to 2021. She is a member of the Progressive Party of Working People (AKEL).

== Early life and career ==
Koukouma Koutra was born in Avgorou, Famagusta District, Cyprus. She completed secretarial studies and received a diploma in architectural design in the United Kingdom.

In 2010, Koukouma Koutra was named president of the Pancyprian Federation of Women's Organizations (POGO). She has also served as vice president of the Women's International Democratic Federation. In July 2023, she attended a conference in Belgium organized by Global Women for Peace United Against NATO.

In April 2024, Koukouma Koutra co-founded the Cyprus Women Bi-Communal Coalition, an advocacy group focused on the inclusion of women in the Cyprus peace process. Other founding members included Anna Koukkides-Procopiou, Ayşegül Baybars, Doğuş Derya, Erato Kozakou-Marcoullis, Jale Refik Rogers, Katherine Clerides, Mine Atlı, Praxoula Antoniadou, and Stefi Drakou.

== Political career ==
In 1990, Koukouma Koutra became a member of the AKEL Central Committee. In 2008, she was elected to the House of Representatives, representing the Famagusta District as a member of AKEL. She was re-elected in the 2011 and 2016 elections.

During her tenure, she served as chair of the Parliamentary Committee on Refugees, Enclaved Persons, Missing Persons and Adversely Affected Persons, and as deputy chair of the Committee on Labour, Welfare and Social Insurance. She was also a member of the committees on the interior, human rights and equal opportunities, public expenditures, and foreign affairs.

In 2020, Koukouma Koutra supported a bill proposed by AKEL that would criminalize prostitution, describing it as the "oldest form of violence against women."
