= 2013 Cypriot presidential election =

- 17 February 2013 (first round); 24 February 2013 (second round)
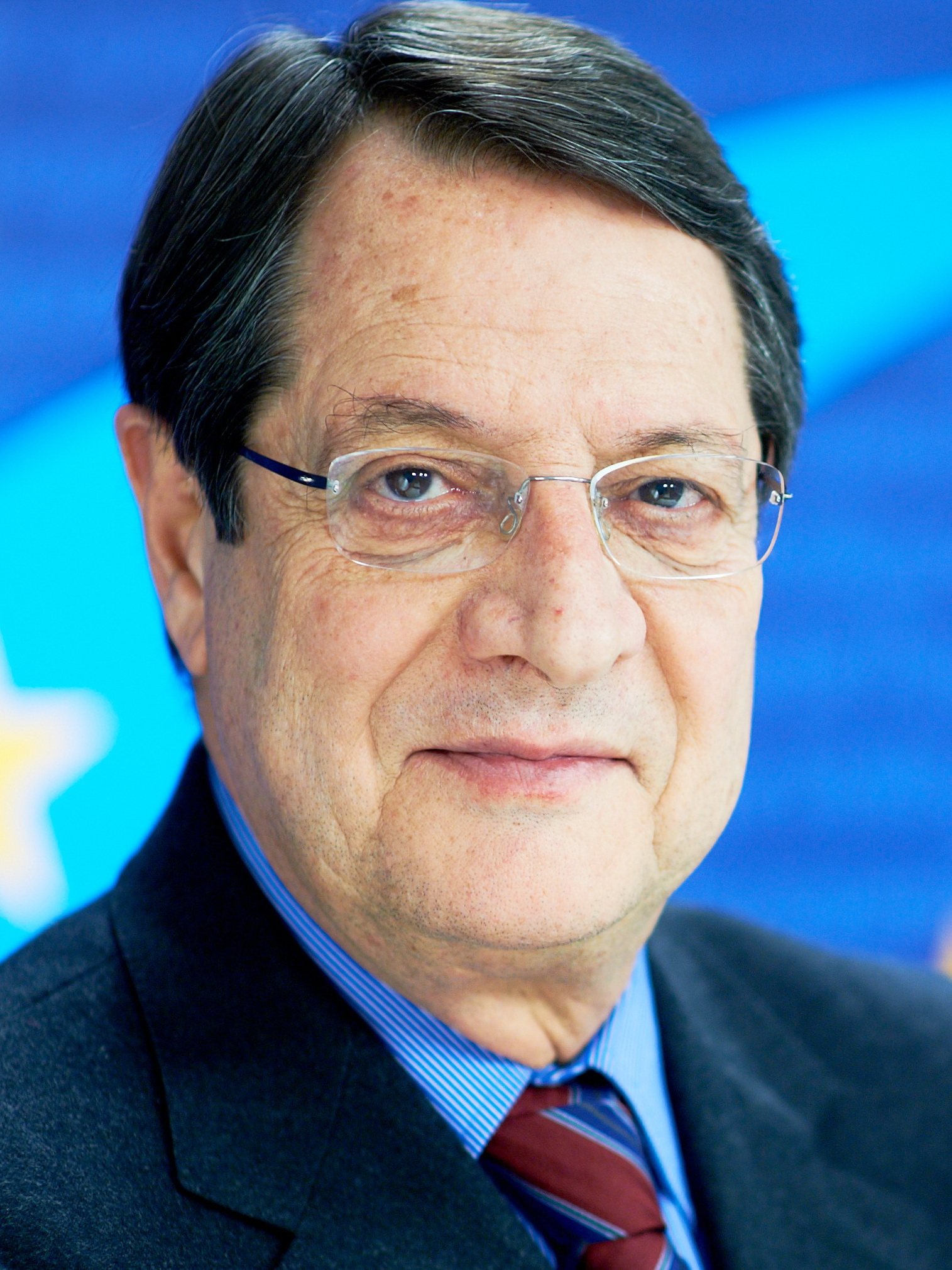

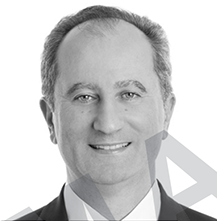
| Nominee | Nicos Anastasiades | Stavros Malas |
| Party | DISY | AKEL |
| Popular vote | 236,965 | 175,267 |
| Percentage | 57.48% | 42.52% |
President before election
Demetris Christofias
AKEL
President-elect
Nicos Anastasiades
DISY

Presidential elections were held in Cyprus on 17 February 2013. A runoff was held on 24 February 2013. Nicos Anastasiades of Democratic Rally won the election. The other candidates were Stavros Malas of the Progressive Party of Working People (AKEL); Praxoula Antoniadou of the United Democrats; Lakis Ioannou with the support of LASOK; Loukas Stavrou; ELAM's Giorgos Charalambous, Giorgos Lillikas of Movement for Social Democracy (EDEK); and independents Andreas Efstratiou, Makaria-Andri Stylianou, Kostas Kyriacou and Solon Gregoriou. Although the president Demetris Christofias was not term-limited, he did not seek re-election in 2013.

== Timeline ==
=== 2012 ===
February

- 11 February: At the Pancypriot Convention of DISY, Nicos Anastasiades confirms his intention to run for president

March

- 17 March: The Supreme Council of DISY approves Nicos Anastasiades as the candidate of the party over MEP Eleni Theocharous

April

- 6 April : Giorgos Lillikas, Former Minister of Foreign Affairs of the island, runs for president as an independent candidate

June

- 6 June: DIKO, Ecological and Environmental Movement, Evroko and EDEK fail to form a coalition of "National Unity"
- 21 June: The Central Committee of AKEL suggests to the Pancypriot Convention of the party, Stavros Malas

July

- 21 July: The members of the Pan-Cypriot Convention of AKEL officially back Stavros Malas
- 27 July: The Central Committee and the Supreme Bureau of EDEK officially back Giorgos Lillikas

August

- 30 August: DISY and DIKO agree for corporation. The Central Committee of DIKO determines its decision in mid-September

September

- 7 September: Stavros Malas runs officially as a presidential candidate with the support of AKEL
- 25 September: DIKO's Executive Bureau officially suggests to the Central Committee of the party to back Nicos Anastasiades
- 27 September: DIKO's Central Committee decides for the election (officially backs Anastasiades)

October

- 7 October : The members of the Pan-Cypriot Convention of the Ecological and Environmental Movement decide for the election
- 15 October : Stavros Malas resigns as Minister of Health caused by his duty as a candidate
- 17 October : Evroko's Executive Bureau decides that the party should not back any of the candidates

November

- 3 November : Evroko's Central Council decides for the election (1st choice: to accept Executive Bureau's decision; 2nd choice: to deny the Bureau's plan and hold a Pan-Cypriot Convention)
- 4 November : An electoral conference is held by the Ecological and Environmental Movement to make the decision official

=== 2013 ===
January

- 2 January: Last day for the voters to register
- 14 January: The first presidential debate is held
- 18 January: The names of the candidates of the election are announced by the Central Electoral Service
- 28 January: The second presidential debate is held

February

- 11 February: The third presidential debate is held
- 17 February: Election Day:
  - 7 am : voting process starts
  - 6 pm : voting process ends
  - 8 30 pm : The results are official
- 24 February : Second round

== Announcements of candidates and support for the first round ==
DISY

The first candidate who confirmed the intention to be the candidate of his party was DISY's Nicos Anastasiades on 11 February 2012 at the Pancypriot Convention of the party. The Supreme Council of DISY (on 17 March) had to choose between Nicos Anastasiades and MEP, Eleni Theocharous. The council voted in favour of Nicos Anastasiades with 673 votes (86.73%) and Eleni Theocharous with 103 votes (13.27%).

AKEL

When president Christofias decided not to be seeking re-election for February 2013, in late July AKEL's Central Committee decided to suggest Minister of Health Stavros Malas to be the candidate of the party. On 21 July 2012 the Pancypriot Convention of AKEL voted in favour of Stavros Malas with 1183 votes (92.3%), against 81 (6.3%) and 17 abstentions (1.3%). Stavros Malas confirmed his candidacy with the support of AKEL on 7 September. On 15 October he resigned as Minister of Health .

Coalition attempt – EDEK

After a failed attempt by DIKO, Evroko, Ecological and Environmental Movement and EDEK to form a coalition, known as Intermediate political space (gr:Ενδιάμεσος πολιτικός χώρος- Endiamesos politikos horos), EDEK decided to back independent candidate Giorgos Lillikas ( who had already confirmed his candidacy on 6 April) on 27 July at the Central Committee of the party.

DIKO

DIKO had two plans on the table. The first was to back Nicos Anastasiades and the second to back a candidate from DIKO. After the talks on 30 August between Nicos Anastasiades and the president of DIKO Marios Garoyian, the two leaders agreed for cooperation. On 25 September the Executive Bureau of DIKO officially suggested the Central Committee to back Anastasiades. At the Central Committee on 27 September 117 members voted in-favour of Anastasiades (81.9%), 27 against and 2 abstained. The two parties had also talks with other parties such as Evroko and the Ecological and Environmental Movement to create and broaden a coalition of "National Unity".

Evroko

Evroko was between to choose either Anastasiades or Lillikas. On 27 September (DIKO's decision day) president of Evroko Demetris Syllouris, had talks with Nicos Anastasiades and most possible scenario was to back DISY. Although, on 17 October Evroko's Executive Bureau decided not to back any of the candidates. At the Central Council, on 3 November, it had to be decided either the acceptance of EB's decision or denial. 75% of the members of the party voted in-favour of EB's decision and 25% against. The members can vote any of the two candidates (Lillikas-Anastasiades) they want.

Ecological and Environmental Movement

The Movement's Convention was held on 7 October. The members had the opportunity to decide which candidate would be backed by the Movement. The results were split between Lillikas and Anastasiades. Lillikas got 45% and Anastasiades 40%. An electoral conference was scheduled to be held on 4 November where the decision was going to be determined. The Movement would back the candidate who obtained 60% of the vote. Although no candidate obtained 60% of the vote and so the voters of the Movement can vote any of the candidates they want.(like Evroko did)

== Candidates and supporting parties ==
Eleven candidates were approved to participate in the elections. Each candidate had to be recommended by one Cypriot citizen and supported by eight more.

=== 1st round ===
All the names of the candidates were announced on 18 January. The names are:

- Nicos Anastasiades, supported by DISY, DIKO, Social Alliance – Evroko, Ecological and Environmental Movement (part)
- Stavros Malas, supported by AKEL
- Giorgos Lillikas, supported by EDEK, Ecological and Environmental Movement (part)
- Lakis Ioannou, supported by LASOK
- Praxoula Antoniadou, supported by EDI
- Giorgos Charalambous, supported by ELAM
- Loukas Stavrou, supported by EDIK
- Andreas Efstratiou
- Makaria-Andri Stylianou
- Solon Gregoriou
- Kostas Kyriacou (Outopos)

=== 2nd round ===
- Nicos Anastasiades, supported by DISY, DIKO, Evroko
- Stavros Malas, supported by AKEL

== Announcements of support for the second round ==
Evroko

After the elimination of Giorgos Lillikas in the first round, Evroko decided to back Nicos Anastasiades.

Ecological and Environmental Movement

The Movement chose to keep the first decision.

EDEK

When Lillikas didn't pass to the second round, the Executive Bureau decided not to endorse any of the remaining candidates. In contrast with EDEK, the Party of European Socialists, the European political party to which EDEK is affiliated, endorsed Malas. This endorsement brought anger to some EDEK's MP.

Orthodox Church of Cyprus

The Archbishop of the Church of Cyprus, Chrysostomos II, endorsed Nicos Anastasiades at the second round.

== Main topics ==
=== Debates ===
Cyprus Broadcasting Corporation had talks with all the spokespersons of the candidates. Lillikas and Malas wanted four debates, three before the first round and one before the second. Anastasiades wanted three (two for the first round and one for the second) because he believed that four debates would "harm the image" of the candidates. In a meeting with spokespersons of four large Cypriot media networks (Mega, ANT1, Sigma, RIK), it was proposed to hold five debates. In two debates all candidates would participate. The other three debates would be double, which means that they would be between two participants (Anastasiades-Malas, Malas-Lillikas, Anastasiades-Lillikas). However, on 7 November it was decided that three debates were going to be held before the first round and one before a possible second round.

The debates were held on 14 and 28 January and 11 February. The fourth and last presidential debate was held on 22 February. The structure of the debates was:

- First presidential debate's subject of discussion was the Cypriot economy.
- Second presidential debate's subject of discussion was the Cyprus dispute.
- The third presidential debate's subject was the economy and domestic affairs of the island.
- 2-hour-long debates.
- 20-second-long questions and 2-minute-long answers. Furthermore, journalists could ask a 15-second-long sub-question and candidates had 30-second-long answers.
- At the end of each section candidates had a minute to comment other candidates' positions.

=== Guinness World Records logo dispute ===
On 29 January, the independent candidate Andreas Efstratiou was accused (by an anonymous citizen) of using the logo of Guinness World Records without the permission of the corporation. The logo was printed on the ballot slip of the election. Efstratiou has been a holder of a Guinness World Record since 2007, when he created the longest wedding-gown train in the world. All the 545,180 ballot slips were destroyed and new ballot slips, without the logo, were printed. It was announced that €40,000 were wasted. The Central Electoral Service asked Efstratiou to pay at least €15,000. He refused, stating that he had 8 children and cannot afford the cost.

== Opinion polls ==
A collection of opinion polls taken before the elections is listed below. After 9 February 2013, no opinion poll was allowed to be published.

| Polling Firm | Source | Date Published | N.Anastasiades | G.Lillikas | S.Malas | Others |
|---|---|---|---|---|---|---|
| RAI Consultants | | 16 September 2012 | 37.2% | 14.2% | 21.9% | 1.5% |
| Evresis | | 18 September 2012 | 35.2% | 17.5% | 19.7% | 1.7% |
| Noverna | | 23 September 2012 | 35.02% | 15.81% | 17.78% | |
| Prime Consulting Ltd | | 7 October 2012 | 34.7% | 17.4% | 18.5% | |
| CMR Cypronetwork / Cybc | | 18 October 2012 | 36.9% | 17% | 23.8% | 1.2% |
| Evresis | | 2 November 2012 | 36.9% | 17.7% | 20.6% | 1.4% |
| RAI Consultants | | 4 November 2012 | 38.8% | 19.8% | 21.1% | 2.3% |
| CMR Cypronetwork / Cybc | | 15 November 2012 | 36.8% | 18.9% | 22.8% | 1.6% |
| Prime Consulting Ltd | | 18 November 2012 | 35.9% | 18.7% | 19.6% | 0.6% |
| Evresis | | 27 November 2012 | 37.1% | 19.6% | 20.8% | 0.6% |
| Noverna | | 2 December 2012 | 35.6% | 17.2% | 18.1% | 4.1% |
| Prime Consulting Ltd | | 3 December 2012 | 35% | 19.1% | 18.6% | 1.4% |
| CMR Cypronetwork / Cybc | | 17 December 2012 | 37.1% | 20.4% | 23.1% | 3.1% |
| Evresis | | 22 December 2012 | 37.4% | 19.8% | 21.8% | 0.5% |
| RAI Consultants Ltd | | 13 January 2013 | 40.3% | 17.9% | 20.5% | 6.1% |
| CMR Cypronetwork / Cybc | | 17 January 2013 | 38% | 19.7% | 23.7% | 2.7% |
| Prime Consulting Ltd | | 27 January 2013 | 39.2% | 18.8% | 19.8% | 4% |
| Evresis | | 1 February 2013 | 40.8% | 19.9% | 22.2% | 2.5% |
| Prime Consulting Ltd | | 4 February 2013 | 39.8% | 19.3% | 20% | 3% |
| Prime Consulting Ltd | | 9 February 2013 | 40.6% | 19.6% | 20.4% | 2.9% |
| RAI Consultants Ltd | | 9 February 2013 | 42.1% | 19.4% | 21.1% | 4.4% |
| CMR Cypronetwork / Cybc | | 9 February 2013 | 39.9% | 20.2% | 24.2% | 3% |
| Average (only valid votes) | – | – | 48.4% | 22.52% | 25.29% | 3.79% |

=== Comparative results (only valid votes) ===
RAI Consultants

| Date Published | N.Anastasiades | G.Lillikas | S.Malas | Others |
|---|---|---|---|---|
| 16/9 | 49.73% | 18.98% | 29.28% | 2% |
| 4/11 | 47.32% | 24.15% | 25.73% | 2.8% |
| 13/1 | 47.52% | 21.11% | 24.17% | 7.19% |
| 8/2 | 48.39% | 22.3% | 24.25% | 5.05% |
| Average | 48.24% | 21.64% | 25.85% | 4.26% |

Evresis

| Date Published | N.Anastasiades | G.Lillikas | S.Malas | Others |
|---|---|---|---|---|
| 18/9 | 47.5% | 23.62% | 26.59% | 2.29% |
| 2/11 | 48.17% | 23.11% | 26.9% | 1.83% |
| 27/11 | 47.5% | 25.1% | 26.63% | 0.77% |
| 22/12 | 47.04% | 24.91% | 27.42% | 0.63% |
| 1/2 | 47.78% | 23.3% | 26% | 2.92% |
| Average | 47.6% | 24% | 26.71% | 1.69% |

Noverna

| Date Published | N.Anastasiades | G.Lillikas | S.Malas | Others |
|---|---|---|---|---|
| 23/9 | 51.04% | 23.04% | 25.91% | |
| 2/12 | 47.47% | 22.93% | 24.13% | 5.46% |
| Average | 49.25% | 23% | 25.02% | 2.73% |

Prime Consulting Ltd

| Date Published | N.Anastasiades | G.Lillikas | S.Malas | Others |
|---|---|---|---|---|
| 7/10 | 49.15% | 24.65% | 26.2% | |
| 18/11 | 48% | 25% | 26.2% | 0.8% |
| 3/12 | 47.23% | 25.78% | 25.1% | 1.89% |
| 27/1 | 47.92% | 22.98% | 24.21% | 4.89% |
| 4/2 | 48.48% | 23.51% | 24.36% | 3.65% |
| 9/2 | 48.62% | 23.47% | 24.43% | 3.47% |
| Average | 48.23% | 24.23% | 25.08% | 2.45% |

CMR Cypronetwork/Cybc

| Date Published | N.Anastasiades | G.Lillikas | S.Malas | Others |
|---|---|---|---|---|
| 18/10 | 46.77% | 21.55% | 30.16% | 1.52% |
| 15/11 | 45.94% | 23.6% | 28.46% | 2% |
| 17/12 | 44.32% | 24.37% | 27.6% | 3.7% |
| 17/1 | 45.18% | 23.42% | 28.18% | 3.21% |
| 9/2 | 45.7% | 23.14% | 27.72% | 3.44% |
| Average | 45.58% | 23.22% | 28.42% | 2.77% |

== Results and reaction ==
On 24 February, Nicos Anastasiades won the presidential election with 57.48% of the vote; his opponent Stavros Malas received the remaining 42.52%. Of 545,000 eligible voters, 412,000 cast a ballot for one of the two candidates. In addition, the 81% turnout was lower than expected. It is believed that many people cast blank ballots or refused to vote out of protest. A week earlier, Anastasiades had won 45% of the first round vote with Malas receiving 27%, necessitating a second round of voting since no candidate received a strong majority of the votes. In that round, Giorgos Lillikas won 24% of the vote and eight minor candidates received under 1% each.

| Candidate | Party | First round | | Second round | |
| Candidate | Party | Votes | % | Votes | % |
|---|---|---|---|---|---|
| Nicos Anastasiades | Democratic Rally | 200,591 | 45.46 | 236,965 | 57.48 |
| Stavros Malas | Progressive Party of Working People | 118,755 | 26.91 | 175,267 | 42.52 |
| Giorgos Lillikas | Movement for Social Democracy | 109,996 | 24.93 | | |
| Giorgos Charalambous | ELAM | 3,899 | 0.88 | | |
| Praxoula Antoniadou | United Democrats | 2,678 | 0.61 | | |
| Makaria-Andri Stylianou | Independent | 1,898 | 0.43 | | |
| Lakis Ioannou | LASOK | 1,278 | 0.29 | | |
| Solon Gregoriou | Independent | 792 | 0.18 | | |
| Kostas Kyriacou | Independent | 722 | 0.16 | | |
| Andreas Efstratiou | Independent | 434 | 0.10 | | |
| Loukas Stavrou | Independent | 213 | 0.05 | | |
| Total | | 441,256 | 100.00 | 412,232 | 100.00 |
| Valid votes | | 441,256 | 97.29 | 412,232 | 92.63 |
| Invalid/blank votes | | 12,278 | 2.71 | 32,777 | 7.37 |
| Total votes | | 453,534 | 100.00 | 445,009 | 100.00 |
| Registered voters/turnout | | 545,491 | 83.14 | 545,493 | 81.58 |
Source: MOI, MOI

=== By district ===
- National:

1st round
| Anastasiades | 45.46% |
| Malas | 26.91% |
| Lillikas | 24.93% |
| Others | 2.70% |

2nd round
| Anastasiades | 57.48% |
| Malas | 42.52% |

- Nicosia:

1st round
| Anastasiades | 45.08% |
| Malas | 25.87% |

2nd round
| Anastasiades | 58.47% |
| Malas | 41.53% |

- Famagusta:

1st round
| Anastasiades | 55.66% |
| Malas | 26.35% |

2nd round
| Anastasiades | 63.89% |
| Malas | 36.11% |

- Larnaka:

1st round
| Anastasiades | 45.50% |
| Malas | 33.14% |

2nd round
| Anastasiades | 54.26% |
| Malas | 45.74% |

- Limassol:

1st round
| Anastasiades | 46.20% |
| Malas | 25.68% |

2nd round
| Anastasiades | 57.76% |
| Malas | 42.24% |

- Paphos:

1st round
| Anastasiades | 38.44% |
| Malas | 22.32% |

2nd round
| Anastasiades | 54.98% |
| Malas | 45.02% |

- Abroad:

1st round
| Anastasiades | 45.53% |
| Malas | 31.90% |

2nd round
| Anastasiades | 55.11% |
| Malas | 44.89% |

== Reactions ==
Anastasiades' victory led to celebrations in the nation's capital of Nicosia and boosted hopes of reaching a financial bailout deal with international banks. Economist Stelios Platis remarked "I would expect the markets, and business, to welcome Anastasiades's victory because he knows the rules of the game very well." However, political analyst Alexander White said immediate resolution to Cyprus' debt problems was unlikely. Agence France-Presse remarked that Anastasiades represented a stark contrast to the outgoing government and speculated that "his perceived bias towards big business may put him on a collision course with influential and powerful trade unions". In his concession speech, Malas pledged to support Anastasiades "in actions and politics that we believe are followed for the good of the country".

== Aftermath ==
Anastasiades was sworn in on 28 February 2013 and assumed power on 1 March.
