= Anna Koukkides-Procopiou =

Cypriot politician (born 1974)

- Άννα Κουκκίδη-Προκοπίου
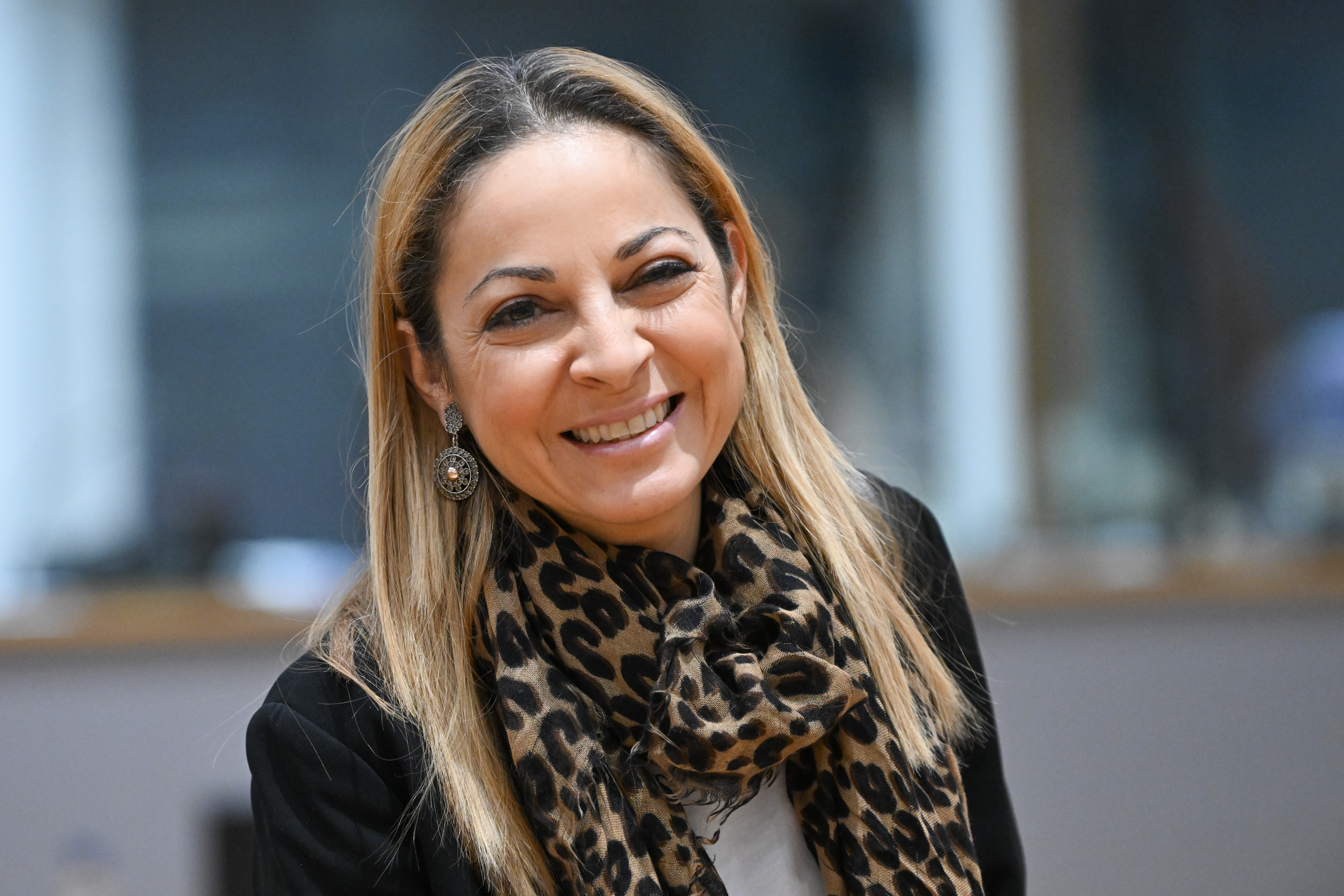
- Koukkides-Procopiou in 2023

Minister of Justice and Public Order
- In office 1 March 2023 – 10 January 2024
- President: Nikos Christodoulides
- Preceded by: Stefi Drakou
- Succeeded by: Marios Hartsiotis

Personal details
- Born: 1974 (age 51–52)
- Education: University College London (BSc), London School of Economics (MSc), University of Nicosia (PhD)
- Profession: Politician, economist, activist

Anna Koukkides-Procopiou (Greek: Άννα Κουκκίδη-Προκοπίου; born 1974) is a Cypriot politician, economist, and activist. She served as the minister of justice and public order of Cyprus from March 2023 to January 2024.

== Early life and education ==
In 1996, Koukkides-Procopiou received a bachelor's degree in economics and history from University College London. She earned her master's degree in international relations at the London School of Economics in 1997.

In 2015, she obtained a certificate in religion and politics from the MacMillan Center for International and Area Studies at Yale University.

== Professional career ==
Koukkides-Procopiou previously served as president of AIPFE Cyprus, the Cypriot branch of the International Association for the Promotion of Women of Europe. She was a speaker at the TEDxNicosiaWomen conference in 2013.

In April 2024, she co-founded the Cyprus Women Bi-Communal Coalition (CWBC), a group of experts advocating for the inclusion of women in the Cyprus peace process. Other founding members included Ayşegül Baybars, Doğuş Derya, Erato Kozakou-Marcoullis, Jale Refik Rogers, Katherine Clerides, Mine Atlı, Praxoula Antoniadou, and Stefi Drakou.

Koukkides-Procopiou is the founder and president of Politeia, a Cyprus-based think tank. She is also a senior fellow and advisory board member at the Center of European and International Affairs at the University of Nicosia.

She is a member of ExxonMobil's Global Women in Management team, based in Washington, D.C.

== Political career ==
In March 2023, Koukkides-Procopiou was named the minister of justice and public order of Cyprus. She served in the role until 10 January 2024, when she was succeeded by Marios Hartsiotis following a cabinet shuffle by President Nikos Christodoulides.

In August 2023, she faced criticism for holding an informal meeting in Cyprus with Israeli minister of national security Itamar Ben-Gvir, who is known for his anti-Arab and anti-Palestinian views.

== Awards and honours ==
In 2017, Koukkides-Procopiou received the Women Economic Forum award for "Iconic Women Creating a Better World for All".

In 2026, she was named a Yale Peace Fellow by the Yale Jackson School of Global Affairs in recognition of her efforts to empower women in the public sphere.
