= Nikos Kosis =

Greek Cypriot politician

Nikos Kosis Νίκος Κόσιης

Ministry of Justice and Public Order
- In office 9 April 1997 – 24 September 2002
- President: Glafcos Clerides
- Preceded by: Stella Soulioti
- Succeeded by: Alekos Siabos

Ministry of the Interior and Defense
- In office 29 August 1974 – 14 January 1975
- President: Glafcos Clerides; Makarios III
- Preceded by: Giorgios Ioannides
- Succeeded by: Christodoulos Benjamin

Member of the House of Representatives for Nicosia
- In office 16 August 1960 – 8 August 1974

Personal details
- Born: 22 December 1933 (age 92) Dali, Cyprus
- Party: Patriotic Front (Cyprus) (1960-1969); Eniaion
- Spouse: Louiza Kosi (m. 1964)
- Children: 3

Nikos Kosis is a Greek Cypriot politician who served as Minister of the Interior and Defense, Minister of Justice and Public Order and as a Member of Parliament in the Nicosia District.

== Personal life ==
Kosis was born in the Nicosia District of Cyprus in the village of Dali on 20 May 1933. He is fluent in both the Greek and English languages and was the publisher of the newspaper "O agon". He has three children and is married to Louiza Kosi.

== Political career ==
He was first elected as a member of parliament in the country's first parliamentary elections in 1960 as a member of parliament for the Nicosia District under the Patriotic Front. He was re-voted in the 1970 parliamentary elections under the Eniaion party.

On 29 August 1974, he was placed as Minister of the Interior and Defense and remained in that position until 14 January 1975.

On 9 April 1997, he was made Minister of Justice and Public order and remained in that position until 24 September 2002.
