= Ministry of Justice and Public Order (Cyprus) =

Government ministry of Cyprus

Ministry of Justice and Public Order of the Republic of Cyprus
- Greek: Υπουργείο Δικαιοσύνης και Δημοσίας Τάξεως της Κυπριακής Δημοκρατίας; Turkish: Kıbrıs Cumhuriyeti Adalet ve Kamu Düzeni Bakanlığı

Ministerial Department overview
- Jurisdiction: Republic of Cyprus
- Minister responsible: Costas Fitiris, Minister of Justice and Public Order
- Website: http://www.mjpo.gov.cy

The Ministry of Justice and Public Order of the Republic of Cyprus (Greek: Υπουργείο Δικαιοσύνης και Δημοσίας Τάξεως της Κυπριακής Δημοκρατίας, Turkish: Kıbrıs Cumhuriyeti Adalet ve Kamu Düzeni Bakanlığı) is one of the 11 ministries of the Republic of Cyprus, and is responsible for the close review and consideration of the need to reform existing legislation in fields such as criminal law, the administration of justice, family law, equality, human rights, and the treatment of offenders. Agencies such as the Cyprus Police and the Cyprus Prisons Department fall under the Ministry of Justice and Public Order.

The ministry was formed immediately after Cyprus gained independence (from the 1959 interim period to 1982) and was hosted in government buildings in Demosthenes Severis Avenue, known as Chief Colonial Secretary Office. In 1982, the ministry moved to Grivas Digenis Avenue in a building opposite the Kykkos monastery dependency at Engomi, where it remained up to 1993. After it was renamed to the Ministry of Justice and Public Order in 1993, it moved to Heliopouleos Street in the building known as the Ellinas Clinic, where it remained up to the year 2000. Since then, it has moved to 125 Athalassas Avenue in Strovolos.

The current Minister is Costas Fitiris, appointed in December 2025.

== List of ministers ==
Minister	Began	Ended
Glafkos Clerides	1960	1960
Spyros Kyprianou	1960	1960
Stella Soulioti	1960	1970
Georgios Ioannidis	1970	1972
Christos Vakis	1972	1974
Lefkos Clerides	1974	1975
Georgios Ioannidis	1975	1978
Petros Michailidis	1978	1980
Andreas Dimitriadis	1980	1982
Phobos Clerides	1982	1985
Dimitris Liberas	1985	1988
Christodoulos Chrysanthou	1988	1990
Nikos Papaioannou	1990	1993
Alekos Evangelou	1993	1996
Georgios Stavrinakis	1996	1996
Alekos Evangelou	1996	1997
Nikos Kosis	1997	2002
Alekos Siabos	2002	2003
Doros Theodorou	2003	2006
Sofoklis Sofokleous	2006	2008
Kypros Chrysostomides	2008	2008
Antonis Paschalides	2008	2008
Luke Lucas	2008	2013
Ionas Nikolaou	2013	2019
George L. Savvides	2019	29 June 2020
Emily Yiolitis	29 June 2020	17 June 2021
Stefi Drakou	22 June 2021	1 March 2023
Anna Koukidi-Prokopiou	1 March 2023	10 January 2024
Marios Hartsiotis	10 January 2024	December 2025
Costas Fitiris	December 2025	

== See also ==
- Cyprus Police
- Cyprus Prisons Department
- Justice ministry
- Υπουργείο Δικαιοσύνης και Δημοσίας Τάξεως της Κύπρου (Ministry of Justice and Public Order of Cyprus)
- Politics of Cyprus
