= Koutra =

Koutra is a Greek surname. Notable people with the surname include:

- Danai Koutra, Greek and American computer scientist
- Konstantina Koutra (born 1979), Greek alpine skier
- Skevi Koukouma Koutra (born 1954), Cypriot politician

== See also ==
- Panos H. Koutras, Greek film director
