= Michalis Papapetrou =

Cypriot politician and diplomat

2nd President of United Democrats
- In office 2005–2007
- Preceded by: George Vasiliou
- Succeeded by: Praxoula Antoniadou

Personal details
- Born: 11 April 1947 (age 79) Nicosia, Cyprus
- Party: United Democrats

Michalis Papapetrou (Greek: Μιχάλης Παπαπέτρου; 11 April 1947) is a Cypriot politician and diplomat. He was born in Nicosia, Cyprus on April 11, 1947. He graduated from the Kykko Pancyprian Gymnasium and after his studies in Law, in the University of Athens and the University College London, he is a practicing lawyer since 1972.

== Career ==
=== OEFEK, OMONIA, and EDON ===
In the past he held the posts of chairman of the Union of Cypriot Students in London, member of the Council of the Federation of Students Unions (OEFEK), Secretary General of OMONIA F.C., member of the Cyprus Bar Council and chairman of EDON.

=== Founder of ADISOK ===
In 1985 he was elected as member of the House of Representatives with AKEL. In 1990, following internal conflict in AKEL and the deposition of Andreas Fantis and Andreas Ziartides, Papapetrou joined the two and Pavlos Diglis and founded ADISOK (Greek: ΑΔΗΣΟΚ - Ανανεωτικό Δημοκρατικό Σοσιαλιστικό Κόμμα). He served ADISOK from the post Chairman, Deputy Chairman and Member of Parliament. In December 1996, following the merging of the Free Democrats with ADISOK, he was elected as Deputy Chairman and in October 2005 as Chairman of the United Democrats.

=== Government spokesman ===
From 25/8/1999 until 28/2/2003 he served as Government Spokesman in Clerides administration. During the same period he was member of the Greek – Cypriot negotiating team in the intercommunal talks on Cyprus held under the auspices of U. N. He is married and has a daughter and a son who are practicing lawyers.

== Recognition ==
Television interviews of Michalis Papapetrou were documented by journalist Pavlos Pavlou (Greek: Παύλος Παύλου) in his book Dimosia Katathesi (Greek: Δημόσια Κατάθεση).
