= Coat of arms of Cyprus =

Coat of arms of the Republic of Cyprus
- Coat of arms of the Republic of Cyprus (2006–Present)
- Armiger: Republic of Cyprus
- Adopted: 1960 (original); 2006 (modern)
- Shield: Copper, a dove volant facing to the sinister Argent in its beak an olive branch; in base, the numbers '1960' Argent
- Supporters: A wreath of olive branches vert

The coat of arms of the Republic of Cyprus was adopted after the island became an independent republic in 1960. Its official design depicts a white dove carrying an olive branch in its beak, placed within a copper-coloured shield. Below the dove appears the year "1960", marking the year of Cypriot independence from British rule. The shield is braced by two olive-green olive branches.

The colours and symbols of the arms are connected with the island's history and political identity. Official descriptions specify the colour of the shield as copper, Pantone 1385 C, referring to Cyprus's ancient association with copper. The olive branches are specified as olive green, Pantone 574 C. Together with the white dove, they are described as symbols of peace.

In heraldic terminology, the arms have been blazoned as: "Or a dove rising proper in its beak argent an olive branch proper; in base, the year '1960' written in Sable". The version commonly used by the government is generally shown with a copper-yellow shield and the date "1960" in white.

== Republic of Cyprus ==
The coat of arms of the Republic of Cyprus depicts a dove carrying an olive branch, symbolizing peace, over "1960", the year of Cypriot independence from British rule. The background is a copper-yellow colour; this symbolises the large deposits of copper ore on Cyprus (chiefly in the form of chalcopyrite, which is yellow in colour). The two-part wreath represents the two ethnic groups of Cyprus, Greeks and Turks.

The Cypriot coat of arms was selected as the main motif of a high value collectors' coin in 2008, the Cyprus introduction to the Eurozone commemorative coin, minted in 2008. The obverse depicts the coat of arms of Cyprus while the reverse depicts Cyprus connected with a ring to Europe, on a transfigured map.

Coat of arms of the Republic of Cyprus (1960–2006)

Coat of arms of the Cyprus Prisons Department

== Northern Cyprus ==
Coat of arms of Northern Cyprus
- Armiger: Turkish Republic of Northern Cyprus
- Adopted: 15 November 1983
- Crest: Star and crescent Argent, inscription "1983" Vert
- Shield: Or, a dove Argent carrying an olive branch Vert
- Supporters: Olive branch Vert

The coat of arms of the internationally unrecognized Turkish Republic of Northern Cyprus are styled closely on the arms of the Republic of Cyprus, except that the '1960' was removed from the shield underneath the dove, replaced with the year '1983' atop the shield, in reference to the Declaration of Independence of the Turkish Republic of Northern Cyprus by Turkey after the Turkish invasion of Cyprus, as well as the Turkish star and crescent emblem was being added above the shield.

In March 2007, a slight change to the layout of the arms was made. The dove is in a different attitude.

Coat of arms of the Turkish Federated State of Cyprus (1975–1983)

Coat of arms of Northern Cyprus (1983–2007)

Coat of arms of Northern Cyprus (2007–present)

Coat of arms of the president of Northern Cyprus

== Previous coats of arms ==
When Cyprus was a British Crown Colony, local colonial officials used a coat of arms (which were never in fact officially granted) of two lions passant guardant, based on the coat of arms of the United Kingdom.

Arms of Richard I (1191–1192)

Seal of The Knights Templar (1192)

Arms of The Kingdom of Jerusalem (1192)

House of Lusignan 1194–1268: Kings of Cyprus

House of Lusignan 1268–1393: Kings of Jerusalem (1st and 4th quarters) and Cyprus (2nd and 3rd quarters)

House of Lusignan 1393–1473: Kings of Jerusalem (1st quarter), Cyprus (2nd and 4th quarters), and Cilician Armenia (3rd quarter)

Coat of arms of Republic of Venice (1500–1571)

Coat of arms of Venetian Cyprus (1555)

Coat of arms of the Ottoman Eyalet of Cyprus (Eyalet-i Ḳıbrıṣ), 1571–1878

Coat of Arms of The Ottoman Empire (1846–1878)

Lusignan arms inescutcheoned in the greater arms of the Republic of Venice, 1680

Coat of arms of United Kingdom (1878–1952)

Badge used semi-officially (1881–1905) by British colonial officials

Badge used semi-officially (1905–1960) by British colonial officials

Coat of arms of United Kingdom (1952–1960)
