= LASOK =

The Popular Socialist Movement (Greek: Λαϊκό Σοσιαλιστικό Κίνημα, ΛΑΣΟΚ, romanized: Laïkó Sosialistikó Kínima) was a center-left political party in the Republic of Cyprus. It participated in the parliamentary elections of 2011, but won no seats. LASOK also participated in the 2013 Cypriot presidential election with the party's founder being a candidate.

The party was re-registered in the Register of Political Parties on 10 April 2014 under the name Civil Rights Office LASOK (Greek: Γραφείο Δικαιωμάτων Πολίτη ΛΑ.ΣΟ.Κ.). The LASOK party was removed from the register on 27 October 2016.

== Election results ==
=== Parliament ===
House of Representatives
Election	Votes			Seats	
Election	#	%	Rank	#	±
2006	981	0.23	11th	0 / 56	New
2011	2,667	0.66	8th	0 / 56	0
