= Cyprus Prisons Department =

- Τμήμα Φυλακών Κύπρου; Tmima Filakon Kiprou
- Cyprus Prisons Department logo

Department of Corrections overview
- Superseding Department of Corrections: Ministry of Justice and Public Order
- Jurisdiction: Republic of Cyprus
- Website: www.mjpo.gov.cy/mjpo/mjpo.nsf/dmlprisons_gr/dmlprisons_gr?OpenDocument

The Cyprus Prisons Department (Greek: Τμήμα Φυλακών Κύπρου, romanized: Tmima Filakon Kiprou) is the Department of Corrections of the Republic of Cyprus. A government agency under the Ministry of Justice and Public Order responsible for overseeing the incarceration of persons convicted of crimes.

A common misconception is that the Cyprus Police runs the correctional facilities in Cyprus. This is mainly because the Cyprus Prisons department and the Cyprus Police have almost identical logos, patches, uniforms and are both operating holding facilities. However the Cyprus Police and the Cyprus Prisons Departments, although under the same ministry, are completely separate.

A simple explanation for who is responsible for keeping a felon at each stage is that the police are responsible for detaining suspects in police holding cells until they are formally charged and then are released to appear at a court on a later date while the Prisons department is responsible for people already convicted by a court to jail time and they are serving their sentence in prison. An exception to this, is felons which have a high probability of escaping if they are released to appear to a court on a later date or felons that are too dangerous to be released, where after they are formally charged by the police they are taken to a court and the court issues a warrant for the person to be placed in a prison for the entire duration of their trial (which can take several years) until they are acquitted or convicted. If the person is convicted, this period of time, counts towards the sentence as time already served.

== Mission ==
The policy of the Department of Prisons is based on four principles.

1. security
2. humanitarian treatment
3. education
4. rehabilitation

For this reason the Department of Prisons has as a primary mission:

- The secure detention of prisoners who are referred to it by the courts.
- Ensuring prison conditions which guarantee respect for human dignity.
- Equal treatment of detainees without any discrimination due to race, color, sex, language, religion, national or social origin, political or other beliefs of prisoners.
- Encouraging self-esteem and developing a sense of responsibility of prisoners by providing them educational opportunities, vocational training, creative recreation, reflection, self-criticism and self-awareness.
- Guiding and assisting prisoners to a new start in life.

== Facilities ==
The Central Jail of Nicosia is the only correctional facility in the Republic of Cyprus, although some very small off-site facilities have been declared as prisons, for use when there is need for a prisoner to be kept separately from the rest of the Prison’s general population.

== See also ==
- Central Jail of Nicosia
- Cyprus Police
