= George L. Savvides =

Attorney-General of the Republic of Cyprus

- Γιώργος Λ. Σαββίδης
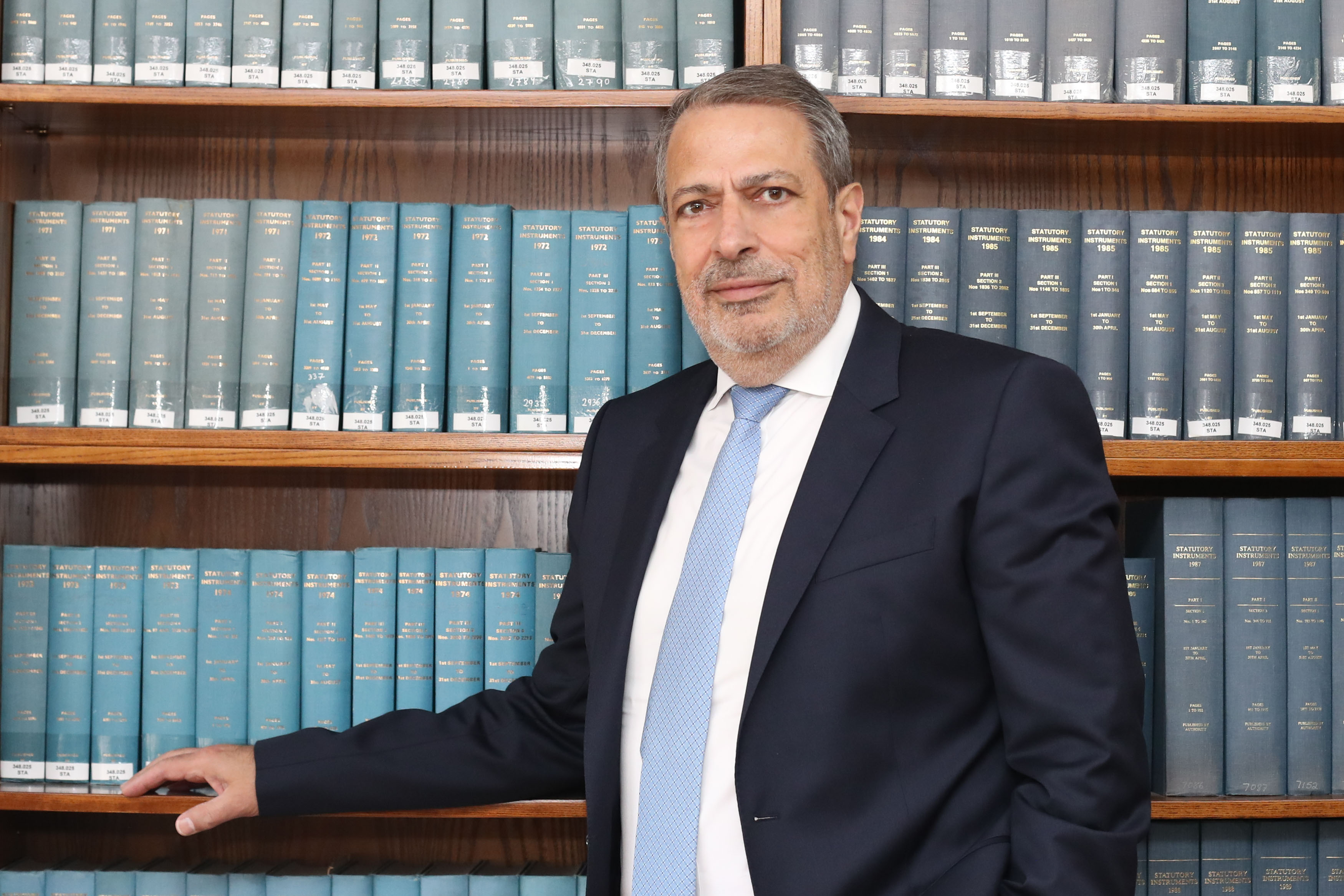
- George L. Savvides

Minister of Justice and Public Order of the Republic of Cyprus
- In office May 31, 2019 – June 29, 2020
- President: Nicos Anastasiades
- Preceded by: Ionas Nicolaou
- Succeeded by: Emily Yiolitis

Attorney-General of Cyprus
- Incumbent
- Assumed office June 29, 2020
- President: Nicos Anastasiades
- Preceded by: Costas Clerides

Personal details
- Born: 1959 (age 66–67) Famagusta Municipality, Cyprus
- Children: 3
- Education: University of Exeter; Member of The Honourable Society of the Middle Temple

George L. Savvides (Greek: Γιώργος Λ. Σαββίδης) is the Attorney-General of the Republic of Cyprus. He previously served as Minister of Justice and Public Order of the Republic of Cyprus.
