= DanSing for You =

Reality show

- Presented by: Christiana Aristotelous (2011–2014, 2016); Konstantina Eyripidou (2018)
- Judges: Evi Droutsa (2011–2014); Jake Athanasiadis (2011–2014, 2016); Alex Panayi (2011); Nikos Mouratidis (2012–2013, 2016); Christina Pavlidou (2014); Dakis (2014); Katerina Gagaki (2016); Christos Dandis (2018); Marios Miltiadous (2018); Mikaella Hatziefrem(2018)
- Country of origin: Cyprus
- Original language: Greek
- No. of seasons: 6

Production
- Running time: approx. 180 to 200 min (including commercials)

Original release
- Network: Mega Channel Cyprus
- Release: September 11, 2011 – 2018

DanSing for You is a Cypriot reality show airing on Mega Channel Cyprus and filming live in Nicosia.

== Structure ==
The show combines the dance and the singing. It first aired on September 11, 2011 and it has a charity purpose. The viewers vote every week via phone and/or text for which couple they want to continue on the show. At the end of every live one couple from the dancing part of the competition and one from the singing part gets eliminated.

Each season, the money from the voting process go to a specific organization. The first season's income went to the Pediatric Oncology Unit of Makarios Hospital in Nicosia, the second's to the Pancyprian Association "Gia Ena Oneiro, Mia Euxi" (For a Dream, a Wish) and the third's to the Anticancer Association of Cyprus.

== Cast ==
=== Hosts ===
Since its premiere in 2010, the show was hosted by Christiana Aristotelous. There was also a co-host for the backstage room, also known as Green Room. The co-host for all three seasons was Vagelis Evaggelou.

Key: Previous Current

Host	Season				
Host	1	2	3	4	5
Christiana Aristotelous					
Vagelis Evaggelou					

=== Judges ===
Evi Droutsa, Jake Athanasiadis and Alex Panayi were the judges of the first season. In the second season, Droutsa and Athanasiadis returned as judges while Panayi was replaced by Nikos Mouratidis. The judges of the second season returned for the third season.

In February 2014, the network ceased their cooperation with the judge Mouratidis due to bad behavior during the semi-final against a contestant.

Key: Previous Current

Host	Season		
Host	1	2	3
Evi Droutsa			
Jake Athanasiadis			
Nikos Mouratidis			
Alex Panayi			

== Series overview ==
Season	No. of stars	No. of weeks	Duration dates	Celebrity honor places			
Season	No. of stars	No. of weeks	Duration dates	Winner (singing)	Second place (singing)	Winner (dancing)	Second place (dancing)
1) Autumn 2011	16	8	11/9/2011 – 30/10/2011	Electra Fotiadou & Hovik	Marina Filippidou Theocharous & Stauros Constantinou	Andreas Filaktou & Aggelika Georgiou	Monika Meleki & Andonis Andoniou
2) Autumn 2012	20(+4)^{a}	12	30/9/2012 – 16/12/12	Andri Karantoni & Giorgos Stamataris	Praxoula Antoniadou & Dakis	Marinos Konsolos & Irini Konsolou	Katerina Loura & Andreas
3) Autumn 2013	22(+3)^{b}	14	17/11/2013-2/2/2014	Irodotos Miltiadous & Salina	Andreas Dimitropoulos & Elena Andreou	Eva Papageorgopoulou & John Olariou	Klelia Giasemidou & Foivos Dimitroudiou

Notes
a. In the middle of the competition, four new couples were added to compete for the rest of the show
b. In the middle of the competition, two new couples were added to compete for the rest of the show and one new contestant replaced another one who withdrew

=== Season 1 (2011) ===
The first season of the show premiered on September 11, 2011. Host of the show was Christiana Aristotelous and the judges were Evi Droutsa, Jake Athanasiadis and Alex Panayi. The celebrities who competed this season were eight for the dancing part of the competition and eight for the singing part, sixteen in total. The show ended on October 30, 2011 and winners were Electra Fotiadou on the singing part of the competition and Andreas Filaktou on the dancing part.

During the live shows, different guest judges appeared to judge the couples. Katerina Zarifi was a guest judge on the third live, Spiros Charitatos appeared on the fourth live, Nikos Mouratidis on the fifth and Maria Mpekatorou on the sixth. Grigoris Arnaoutoglou was a guest judge on the semi-final and Victoras Papadopoulos guested in the finals.

==== Couples ====
Dance
Celebrity	Occupation	Professional partner	Status
Valentina Sofokleous	Actor	Andonis Andoniou	Eliminated 1st on September 18, 2011
Stella Nikolaou	TV Presenter	John Olarious	Eliminated 2nd on September 25, 2011
Onoufrios Sokratous	Journalist, TV Presenter	Aga Chrisostomou	Eliminated 3rd on October 2, 2011
Elia Ioannidou	Actor	Ntinos Christodoulidis	Eliminated 4th on October 9, 2011
Maria Michael	Actor	John Christofidis	Eliminated 5th on October 16, 2011
Giorgos Roussos	TV Presenter	Anna Christodoulidou	Third place on October 23, 2011
Monika Meleki	Actor	Andonis Andoniou	Runner-up on October 30, 2011
Andreas Filaktou	Actor	Aggelika Georgiou	Winner on October 30, 2011

Sing
Celebrity	Occupation	Professional partner	Status
Pepi Monia	Actor	Giorgos Stamataris	Eliminated 1st on September 18, 2011
Koulis Nikolaou	Actor	Elena Andreou	Eliminated 2nd on September 25, 2011
Loukia Protopapa	Actor	Andreas Ektoras	Eliminated 3rd on October 2, 2011
Andreas Georgiou	Actor	Vera Boufi	Eliminated 4th on October 9, 2011
Andreas Azas	Journalist, TV Presenter	Olga Venetsianou	Eliminated 5th on October 16, 2011
Christos Grigoriadis	Actor	Elena Anagiotou	Third place on October 23, 2011
Marina Filippidou Theocharous	TV Presenter	Stauros Constantinou	Runner-up on October 30, 2011
Electra Fotiadou	Actor	Hovik	Winner on October 30, 2011

=== Season 2 (2012) ===
The second season of the show premiered on September 30, 2012. Host of the show was Christiana Aristotelous and the judges were Evi Droutsa, Jake Athanasiadis and Nikos Mouratidis. The celebrities who competed this season were ten for the dancing part of the competition and ten for the singing part, twenty in total.

In November 2012 it was announced that four new couples would be added to the remaining ones and would compete for the rest of the show. The four new couples made their first appearance on November 18, 2012. One of the new contestants was going to be the politician Andreas Pitsillidis but his participation was cancelled after the party of Pitsillidis reacted negative to the announcement of his name as contestant. Pitsillidis was replaced by the actor Costas Schiniou

On October 28, 2012, at the end of the fifth live, Konstantia Pavlou withdrew from the competition due to injury and on December 2, 2012, right after their appearance at the tenth live, the professional dancer Angela Georgiou and partner of Marinos Konsolos announced that she had to leave the show due to pregnancy. Konsolos continued his appearances with his new partner, Eirini Konsolou.

The show ended on December 16, 2012 and the winners were Andri Karantoni on the singing part of the competition and Marinos Konsolos on the dancing part.

==== Couples ====
Dance
Celebrity	Occupation	Professional partner	Status
Giorgos Tofas	Actor	Anna Christodoulidou	Eliminated 1st on October 7, 2012
Loukia Michael	Actor	John Christofidis	Eliminated 2nd on October 14, 2012
Chrisanthos Chrisanthou	Actor	Aga Chrisostomou	Eliminated 3rd on October 21, 2012
Konstantia Pavlou	Actor	Panagiotis Sevastidis	Withdrew on October 28, 2012
Giota Koufalidou	Model, actor	Ntinos Christodoulidis	Eliminated 5th on November 4, 2012
Loukas Zikos	Actor	Elena Kiriakou	Eliminated 6th on November 11, 2012
Ntoris Kyriakidou^{‡}	Actor	Andonis Andoniou	Eliminated 7th on November 18, 2012
Elias Adamou^{‡}	Journalist	Elena Clark	Eliminated 8th on November 25, 2012
Tasos Theodorou	TV Presenter	Barbara Georgiou	Eliminated 9th on December 2, 2012
Maria Fiaka	Actor	John Olariou	Third place on December 9, 2012
Katerina Loura	Actor	Andonis Andoniou	Runner-up on December 16, 2012
Marinos Konsolos	Actor	Angela Georgiou; Irene Konsolou (last 2 lives)	Winner on December 16, 2012

Sing
Celebrity	Occupation	Professional partner	Status
Elena Liasidou	Actor	Kipros Charilaou	Eliminated 1st on October 7, 2012
Katerina Agapitou	TV Presenter	Lazaros Kontozis	Eliminated 2nd on October 14, 2012
Marinos Ksenofontos	Actor	Anita Constandinou	Eliminated 3rd on October 21, 2012
Costakis Constantinou	Actor	Olga Freri	Eliminated 4th on October 28, 2012
Christoforos Christoforou	Actor	Bambina Kontea	Eliminated 5th on November 4, 2012
Michael Moustakas	Actor	Mikaella Hatziefrem	Eliminated 6th on November 11, 2012
Marileni Stavrou	Actor	Teukros Neokleous	Eliminated 7th on November 18, 2012
Costas Schiniou^{‡}	Actor	Evgenia Balafa	Eliminated 8th on November 25, 2012
Dimitris Souglis^{‡}	Journalist, TV Presenter	Flora Constandinou	Eliminated 9th on December 2, 2012
Christiana Artemiou	Actor	Chrissie Andreou	Third place on December 9, 2012
Praxoula Antoniadou	Politician	Dakis	Runner-up on December 16, 2012
Andri Karandoni	Model, TV Presenter	Giorgos Stamataris	Winner on December 16, 2012

^{‡}Indicates the couples who were added to the show in the middle of the competition

=== Season 3 (2013–2014) ===
The third season of the show premiered on November 17, 2013. Host of the show was Christiana Aristotelous and the judges were Evi Droutsa, Jake Athanasiadis and Nikos Mouratidis. The celebrities who competed this season were eleven for the dancing part of the competition and eleven for the singing part, twenty-two in total.

On December 1, 2013, at the end of the third live, the professional singer Kipros Charilaou and partner of Stella Stilianou announced that he had to leave the show for personal reasons. Stilianou continued her appearances with her new partner, Mikaella Hatziefrem. On December 15, 2013, at the end of fifth live, Panagiotis Dimopoulos withdrew from the competition due to injury and he was replaced by the wardrobe stylist Nikolas Ioannidis. Also, Aristotelous announced that two new couples would be added from the next live and compete to the remaining competition.

The show ended on February 2, 2014 and the winners were Irodotos Miltiadous on the singing part of the competition and Eva Papageorgopoulou on the dancing part. During the final live show, Aristotelous didn't feel well and she had to withdraw. Giorgos Roussos stepped in to host the rest of the final.

Few days after the end of the show, Mega Channel Cyprus ceased its cooperation with the judge Mouratidis due to bad behavior during the semi-final against a contestant.

==== Couples ====
Dance
Celebrity	Occupation	Professional partner	Status
Elena Efstathiou	Actor	Andonis Andoniou	Eliminated 1st on November 24, 2013
Andreas Ektoras	Singer	Anna Christodoulidou	Eliminated 2nd on December 1, 2013
Elena Diamantidou	Actor	Andreas Savva	Eliminated 3rd on December 8, 2013
Panagiotis Dimopoulos	Journalist, TV Presenter	Andreas Nikolaou	Withdrew on December 15, 2013
Rozita Kendala	Model	Andreas Foti	Eliminated 4th on December 15, 2013
Tasos Evaggelou	Journalist	Barbara Georgiou	Eliminated 5th on December 22, 2013
Stella Georgiadou	Singer	Ntinos Christodoulidis	Eliminated 6th on December 29, 2013
Iakovos Chatjivasilis	Actor	Elena Clark	Eliminated 7th on January 5, 2014
Nikolas Ioannidis^{1}	Wardrobe stylist	Andria	Eliminated 8th on January 12, 2014
Ioanna Filippou^{‡}	Model	Andreas Foklas	Eliminated 9th on January 19, 2014
Ioanna Poliniki	Actor	Petros Anastasiou	Third place on January 26, 2014
Klelia Giasemidou	Model	Foivos Dimitroudiou	Runner-up on February 2, 2014
Eva Papageorgopoulou	Actor	John Olariou	Winner on February 2, 2014

Sing
Celebrity	Occupation	Professional partner	Status
Evelyn Kazantzoglou	TV Presenter	Euagoras Euagorou	Eliminated 1st on November 24, 2013
Giulio D'Errico	Actor	Julia Petrou	Eliminated 2nd on December 1, 2013
Constantinos Champalis	Actor	Elena Panagi	Eliminated 3rd on December 8, 2013
Yiota Cross	Actor	Chrisostomos Filaktou	Eliminated 4th on December 15, 2013
Fotis Akathiotis	Singer	Giota Karra	Eliminated 5th on December 22, 2013
Andreas Kavazis	Chef	Annita Constantinou	Eliminated 6th on December 29, 2013
Niki Dragoumi	Actor	Ermogenis Skitinis	Eliminated 7th on January 5, 2014
Mara Constantinou	Actor	Aggelos Augoustis	Eliminated 8th on January 12, 2014
Stella Stilianou	Actor	Kipros Charilaou (Lives 1–3); Mikaella Chatjiefrem (Lives 4–12)	Eliminated 9th on January 19, 2014
Leuteris Zampetakis^{‡}	Actor	Christina Tselepou	Third place on January 26, 2014
Andreas Dimitropoulos	Journalist	Elena Andreou	Runner-up on February 2, 2014
Irodotos Miltiadous	Actor	Salina	Winner on February 2, 2014

^{1}Replaced Panagiotis Dimopoulos who withdrew at the end of the fifth live
^{‡}Indicates the couples who were added to the show in the middle of the competition

=== Season 4 ===
Giorgos Chouliaras, the general manager of Mega, announced that there will be a fourth season but he didn't give any more details about it.
