= Euro gold and silver commemorative coins (Cyprus) =

Republic of Cyprus Κυπριακή Δημοκρατία (Greek) Kypriakī́ Dīmokratía Kıbrıs Cumhuriyeti (Turkish)
- ISO 3166 code: CY

Euro gold and silver commemorative coins are special euro coins minted and issued by member states of the Eurozone, mainly in gold and silver, although other precious metals are also used in rare occasions. Cyprus introduced the euro (€) on 1 January 2008. In 2000, in such a short time, the Central Bank of Cyprus has produced the first commemorative euro coin in silver. In 2010 the Central Bank of Cyprus has produced 2 more commemorative euro coin in gold and silver.

These special coins has a legal tender only in Cyprus, unlike the normal issues of the Cypriot euro coins, which have a legal tender in every country of the Eurozone. This means that the commemorative coins made of gold and silver cannot be used as money in other countries. Furthermore, as their bullion value generally vastly exceeds their face value, these coins are not intended to be used as means of payment at all—although it remains possible. For this reason, they are usually named Collectors' coins.

The coins usually commemorate the anniversaries of historical events or draw attention to current events of special importance.

== Summary ==
As of 3 November 2010, two variations of Cypriot euro commemorative coin has been minted. This special high-value commemorative coin is not to be confused with €2 commemorative coins, which are coins designated for circulation and do have legal tender status in all countries of the Eurozone.

The following table shows the number of coins minted per year. In the first section, the coins are grouped by the metal used, while in the second section they are grouped by their face value.

Year	Issues		By metal				By face value	
Year	Issues		gold	silver	Others		€20	€5
2008	1		–	1	–		-	1
2009	0		-	-	–		-	-
2010	2		1	1	–		1	1
2011	0		-	-	–		-	-
2012	1		-	1	–		-	1
2013	2		1	1	–		1	1
2014	1		-	1	-		-	1
2015	1		-	1	-		-	1
2016	1		-	1	-		-	1
2017	1		-	1	-		-	1
2018	1		-	1	-		-	1
2019	1		-	1	-		-	1
2020	1		-	1	-		-	1
2021	2		1	1	–		1	1
2022	1		-	1	-		-	1
2023	1		-	1	-		-	1
2024	1		-	1	–		-	1
2025	1		-	1	–		-	1
2026	1	-	1	–	-	1		
Total	19	3	16	–	3	16		
Coins were minted No coins were minted Scheduled to be minted

== 2008 Coinage ==
Accession of Cyprus to the Eurozone			
Designer: Nicolas Loucas		Mint: Mint of Finland	
Value: €5	Alloy: Ag 925 (silver)	Quantity: 15,000	Quality: Proof
Issued: 2008	Diameter: 38.61 mm (1.52 in)	Weight: 28.28 g (1.00 oz; 0.91 ozt)	Issue price: €38 Market value: €43-€49
The obverse depicts the Coat of arms of Cyprus. The Greek text "Η ένταξη της Κύπρου στην ΟΝΕ 2008" (I entaxi tis Kyprou stin ONE 2008, "Integration of Cyprus into EMU 2008") can be easily seen. The reverse depicts Cyprus connected with a ring to Europe, on a transfigured map.

== 2010 Coinage ==
=== Gold ===
The 50th anniversary of the Republic of Cyprus			
Designer: Clara Zacharaki-Georgiou		Mint: Bank of Greece / Mint	
Value: €20	Alloy: Gold 971	Quantity: 750	Quality: Proof
Issued: 2010	Diameter: 22.05 mm (0.87 in)	Weight: 7.98 g (0.28 oz; 0.26 ozt)	Issue price: €500 Market value:
The obverse depicts the original emblem of the Republic of Cyprus, which coincides with the emblem of the Central Bank of Cyprus, the words «ΚΥΠΡΙΑΚΗ ΔΗΜΟΚΡΑΤΙΑ» and «KIBRIS CUMHURİYETİ» and the dates «1960-2010». The reverse depicts a stylised tree with its complex branches embracing a pigeon. The coin's nominal value of €20 is also depicted.

=== Silver ===
The 50th anniversary of the Republic of Cyprus			
Designer: Clara Zacharaki-Georgiou		Mint: Bank of Greece / Mint	
Value: €5	Alloy: Ag 925 (silver)	Quantity: 5,000	Quality: Proof
Issued: 2010	Diameter: 38.61 mm (1.52 in)	Weight: 28.28 g (1.00 oz; 0.91 ozt)	Issue price: €40 Market value:
The obverse depicts the original emblem of the Republic of Cyprus, which coincides with the emblem of the Central Bank of Cyprus, the words «ΚΥΠΡΙΑΚΗ ΔΗΜΟΚΡΑΤΙΑ» and «KIBRIS CUMHURİYETİ» and the dates «1960-2010». The reverse depicts a stylised tree with its complex branches embracing a pigeon. The coin's nominal value of €5 is also depicted.

== 2013 Coinage ==
50 Years of the Central Bank of Cyprus.

== 2014 Coinage ==
5 Euros – 100th. Anniversary of the birth and the 10th. Anniversary of the death of Costas Montis.

== 2015 Coinage ==
5 Euros – Aphrodite.
