= Emily Yiolitis =

Cypriot politician (born 1976)

Emily Yolitis
- Έμιλυ Γιολίτη

Minister of Justice and Public Order
- In office 29 June 2020 – 17 June 2021
- President: Nicos Anastasiades
- Preceded by: Giorgos Savvides
- Succeeded by: Stefi Drakou

Personal details
- Born: 20 May 1976 (age 50)
- Education: Trinity College, Oxford, European University Institute
- Occupation: Lawyer, politician

Emily Yiolitis (Greek: Έμιλυ Γιολίτη; born 20 May 1976) is a Cypriot lawyer and politician who served as the minister of justice and public order from 2020 to 2021.

== Early life and career ==
Yiolitis studied jurisprudence at Trinity College, Oxford, obtaining a BA in 1997 and an MA in 2000. She later received her Master of Laws in legal studies in comparative European law from the European University Institute. She has been a member of the Cyprus Bar Association since 1998.

Yiolitis has served as chairwoman of the Cyprus Electricity Authority, and as a member of the boards of the Cyprus Telecommunications Authority, the INBLF International Legal Network, Hope for Children, and the Cyprus Red Cross Society. She is a founding member of AIPFE Cyprus, the Cypriot branch of the International Association for the Promotion of Women of Europe.

In May 2022, Yiolitis co-founded Anemi Trustees and became the chief executive officer of the trustee company.

== Political career ==
On 29 June 2020, Yiolitis was appointed Minister of Justice and Public Order by President Nicos Anastasiades, succeeding Giorgos Savvides.

On 17 June 2021, Yiolitis resigned from the position, stating that Anastasiades had accused her of damaging his reputation and that of the government. Her duties were temporarily assumed by Minister of Defence Charalambos Petrides until Stefi Drakou was appointed as her successor.
