= Stella Soulioti =

Cypriot politician (1920–2012)

- Στέλλα Σουλιώτη
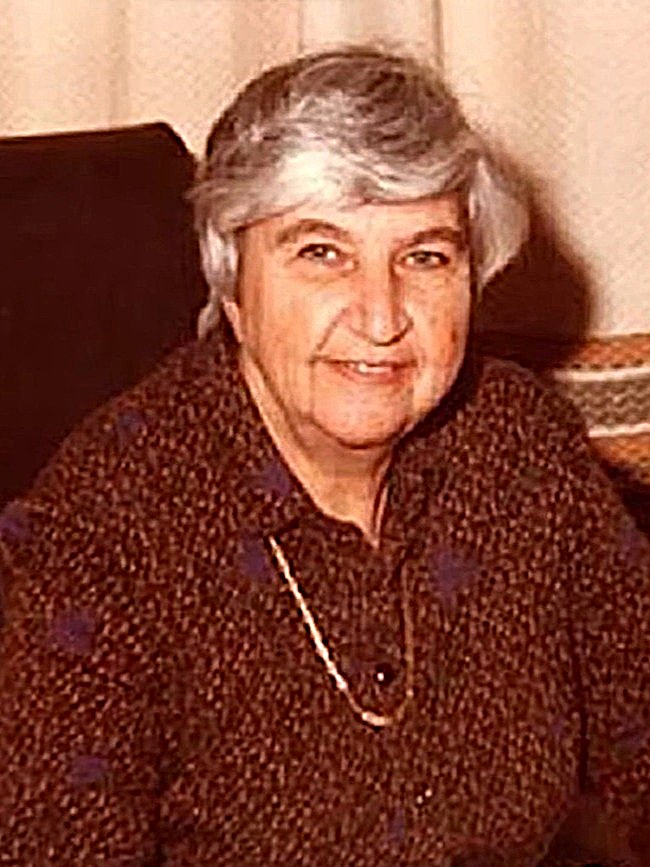
- Soulioti in 1980

Minister of Justice and Public Order
- In office 31 August 1960 – 30 June 1970
- President: Makarios III
- Succeeded by: Georgios Ioannidis

Minister of Health
- In office 27 April 1964 – 20 April 1966
- President: Makarios III
- Preceded by: Niyazi Manyera
- Succeeded by: Tassos Papadopoulos

Attorney General of the Republic of Cyprus
- In office 1984–1988
- President: Makarios III
- Preceded by: Kriton Tornaritis
- Succeeded by: Michalakis Triantafyllides

Personal details
- Born: February 13, 1920 Limassol, British Cyprus
- Died: November 1, 2012 (aged 92) Limassol, Cyprus
- Occupation: Politician, lawyer, writer

Stella Soulioti (Greek: Στέλλα Σουλιώτη) (13 February 1920 – 1 November 2012) was a Cypriot attorney and politician.

== Early life and education ==
Soulioti was born in Limassol, the daughter of lawyer Panayiotis Cacoyannnis. She was the sister of film director Michael Cacoyannis. Soulioti was the first Cypriot woman to join the RAF during World War II, retiring with the rank of Flight lieutenant. She received her education in Cyprus and in Egypt before being called to the bar as a member of Gray's Inn in 1950.

== Career ==
Soulioti returned to Cyprus, practicing law in her birth city from 1952 until 1960.

In 1961, Soulioti took the helm of the Red Cross in Cyprus, leading the organization until 2004; at the time of the Turkish invasion of 1974, she was responsible for coordinating thousands of volunteers, which gained her international recognition. She was a follower of Archbishop Makarios, with whom she worked closely, and in 1960 she was named Justice Minister of Cyprus, the first woman in the world to hold such a position. She remained in the post until 1970, serving as well as Minister of Health from 1964 to 1966; between 1971 and 1974 she was the island's first Commissioner of Law, and from 1984 to 1988 she served as attorney general, the first woman in the nation's history to hold the post.

From 1987 until 1991, Soulioti was a member of UNESCO's executive board. She held numerous other honorary posts in Cyprus throughout her career, and in 1982 and 1983 spent time as a visiting fellow at Wolfson College, Cambridge. She also helped establish scholarship programmes for Cypriot students to attend Cambridge for graduate studies.

== Personal life ==
In 1949, Soulioti married Demetrios Souliotis. She had a daughter, Alexia. She died on November 1, 2012, aged 92, in Limassol. She is buried at Agios Nikolaos cemetery in Limassol.

In 2020, Soulioti was commemorated by a stamp from the Cyprus post.

== Publications ==
- Soulioti, Stella (1998). Brief history of intercommunal negotiations since 1974: Interim Report of the Committee on Turkish Affairs, 1949. Nicosia.
- Soulioti, Stella (2006). Fettered independence: Cyprus, 1878-1964. Minneapolis, Minn.: Modern Greek Studies, University of Minnesota.
