= Stefi Drakou =

Cypriot politician (born 1947)

- Στέφη Δράκου

Minister of Justice and Public Order
- In office 2 July 2021 – 28 February 2023
- President: Nicos Anastasiades
- Preceded by: Emily Yiolitis
- Succeeded by: Anna Koukkides-Procopiou

Personal details
- Born: 11 May 1947 (age 79)
- Occupation: Lawyer, politician

Stefi Drakou (Greek: Στέφη Δράκου; born 11 May 1947) is a Cypriot lawyer and politician who served as the minister of justice and public order from June 2021 to February 2023.

== Early life and career ==
Drakou studied law at the Middle Temple in London, where she received the title of Barrister at Law.

She began her career in the insurance industry, working as a manager of Sun Alliance / Aeolos Insurance Cyprus and as general manager of Laiki Asfalistiki.

In 2007, Drakou became general manager of the Cyprus Insurance Companies Association, and she would later serve two terms as president of the association. She is a founding member of the Insurance Institute of Cyprus, and previously served as president of the organisation.

She also served as a member of the board of the Cyprus Broadcasting Corporation.

== Political career ==
Drakou served as a municipal councillor in Strovolos.

In June 2021, she was appointed Minister of Justice and Public Order by President Nicos Anastasiades, following the resignation of Emily Yiolitis. She was sworn in to the Council of Ministers on 2 July. She served in the role until 28 February 2023, when she was succeeded by Anna Koukkides-Procopiou.

In 2022, Drakou represented Cyprus at the platinum jubilee of Queen Elizabeth II, where she thanked the United Kingdom government for its "principled stance regarding the Cyprus problem."
