= Andreas Ziartides =

Cypriot trade unionist and politician

- Ανδρέας Ζιαρτίδης

2nd Secretary General of Pancyprian Federation of Labour
- In office 1943–1987
- Preceded by: Andreas Fantis
- Succeeded by: Pavlos Diglis

Member of the Cyprus Parliament
- In office 1960–1991

Personal details
- Born: 1919 Nicosia, Cyprus
- Died: 1997 (aged 77–78) Nicosia, Cyprus
- Party: AKEL, ADESOK, United Democrats
- Spouse: Kioula Chrysostomou
- Children: 3

Andreas Ziartides (Greek: Ανδρέας Ζιαρτίδης; 1919–1997) was a Cypriot trade unionist and politician. He served as a member of the House of Representatives for AKEL from 1960 to 1991.

He was Secretary General of the Pancyprian Federation of Labour (PEO) from 1943 to 1986. His contribution to the development of labour relations and labour legislation in Cyprus has been crucial and many consider him the person with the most significant role in shaping the trade union movement on the island. Legislation such as the Social Security Law of Cyprus in 1956 (Πρώτος Νόμος Περί Κοινωνικών Ασφαλίσεων, Νόμος Αρ. 31 του 1956), the introduction of the Cost of Living Allowance, the eight-hour working day and the forty hour working week, legislation on unfair dismissal and the labour disputes tribunals, the shaping of the collective agreements in many sectors of economic activity as well as the tripartite cooperation between trade unions, employers’ organisations and government all bear his mark.

In 1939, he joined the outlawed Communist Party of Cyprus, and later became a member of left wing party AKEL upon its foundation in 1941. He was Secretary General of the Pancyprian Trade Union Committee, the first coordinating body of trade unions in Cyprus and the precursor of PEO. He was accused along with all the Committee members for sedition and insurrection against the Colonial order and sentenced to 18 months imprisonment in 1946. This was a major political trial of the colonial era and his address to the court was a memorable anti-colonial statement.

Ziartides participated as the Cypriot representative at the World Trade Union Conference held in 1945 in London. He served on the General Council and the Executive Committee of the WFTU for many years and was its Vice President for a while.

In the early nineties he, along with others in the AKEL leadership, disagreed with the line followed by the Party and was dismissed from his leadership position. This led to his and others’ departure from AKEL and the formation of ADESOK, in Greek: ΑΔΗΣΟΚ (Ανανεωτικό Δημοκρατικό Σοσιαλιστικό Κόμμα), a reformist leftist party. ADESOK was later merged with Free Democrats Movement (founded by former President of Cyprus George Vassiliou) and formed a new party named United Democrats.

A form of interview/biography of Ziartides was authored by Panikos Paionides in his book Ανδρέας Ζιαρτίδης: Χωρίς φόβο και πάθος.

Television interviews of Ziartides were documented by journalist Pavlos Pavlou (Greek: Παύλος Παύλου) in his book Dimosia Katathesi (Greek: Δημόσια Κατάθεση). One of the television interviews given to journalist Spyros Kettiros (Greek: Σπύρος Κέττηρος) (12 January 1994) in his TV programme En Lefko (Εν Λευκώ), is available from the CyBC archive Digital Herodotus.

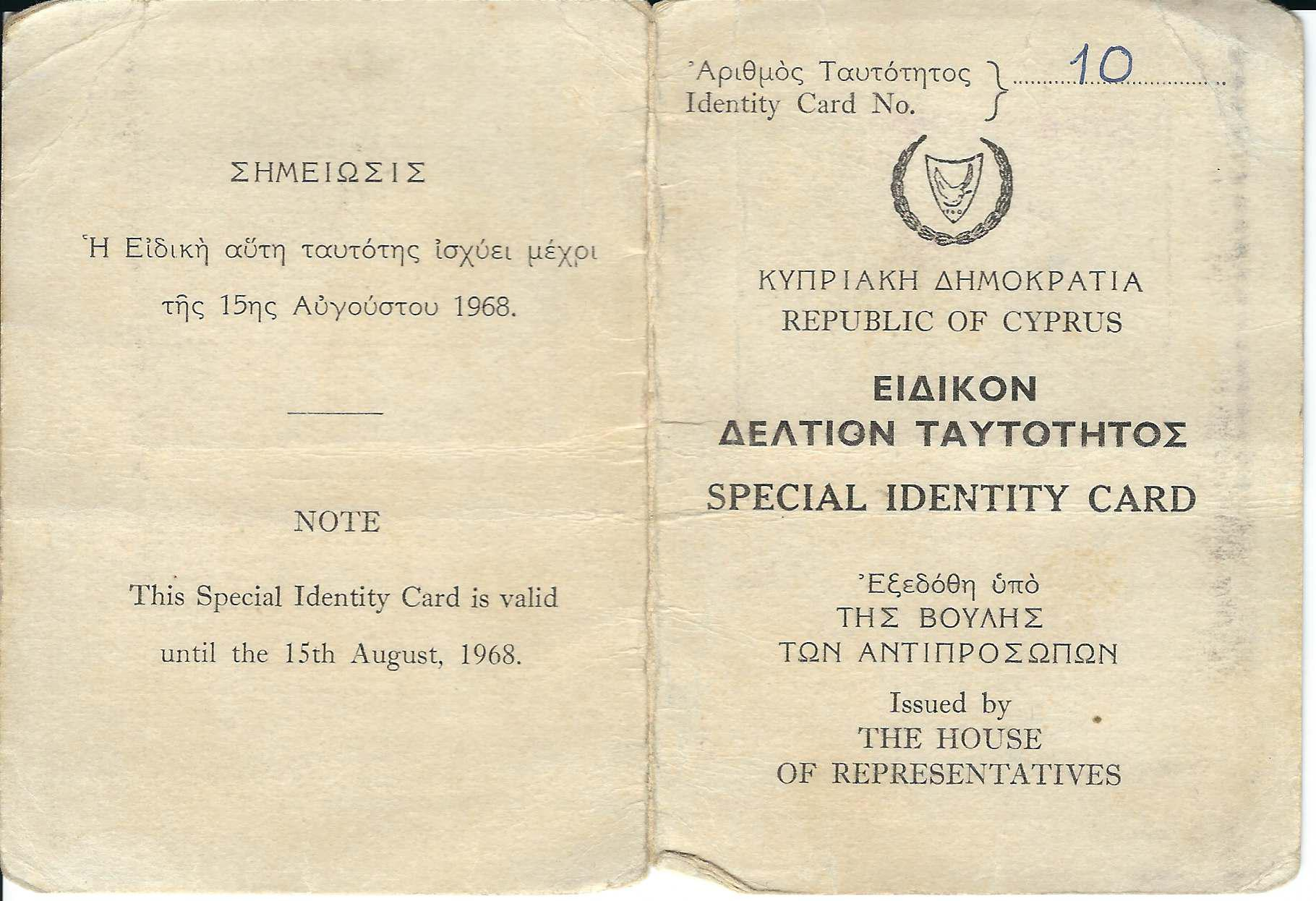
Special Identity Card of Andreas Ziartides, issued by the House of Representatives on 23/10/1967 (outside).

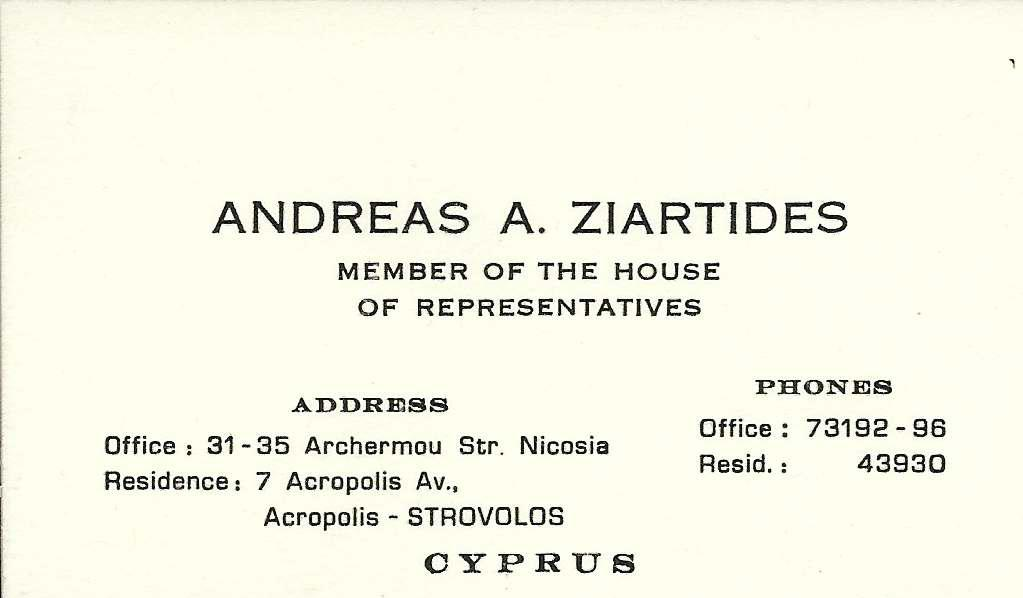
Business card of Andreas A. Ziartides, as Member of the House of Representatives of the Republic of Cyprus.
