= Doğuş Derya =

Turkish Cypriot activist and politician

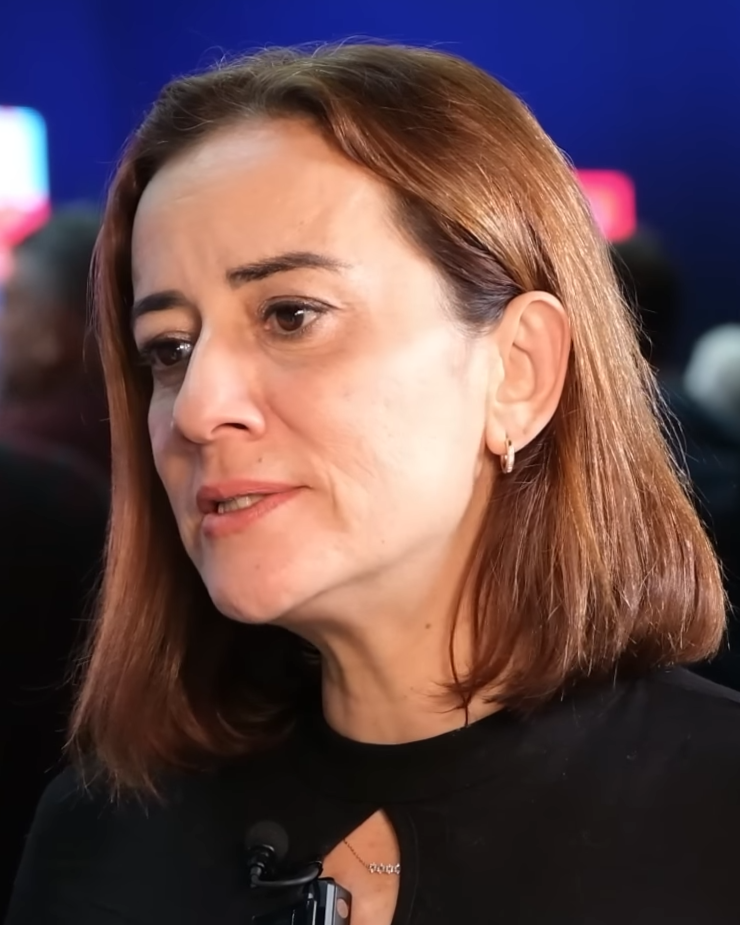

Personal details
- Born: 1978 (age 47–48) Nicosia, Cyprus (de jure); North Nicosia, Turkish Federated State of Cyprus (de facto)
- Party: Republican Turkish Party
- Education: Istanbul University

Doğuş Derya (born 1978) is a Turkish Cypriot activist and politician. She was elected a member of the Assembly of the Republic of Northern Cyprus in 2013.

== Early years, education and activism ==
Derya was born in North Nicosia in 1978. She studied Political Science and International Relations in Istanbul University and graduated in 1999. She then went on to complete a master's degree in the Department of Sociology of Boğaziçi University in Istanbul. She completed her PhD at the Department of Middle Eastern Studies, University of Cyprus.

She was one of the founders of the Association of University Representatives in 1997-98 and of the Cyprus Youth Platform in 2001. In the final years of her education, she participated in activities of women's rights associations in Turkey.

After returning to Cyprus in 2007, she started teaching political sociology in the Near East University, and continued this job until 2008. She established the Communal Gender Equality Mechanism (TOGEM) under the Ministry of Labor and Social Security from 2008 to 2009, and began her activities in the non-governmental organization Feminist Workshop (FEMA). Meanwhile, she conducted academic research on sexual theorems, identity and nationalism. In 2012, she established the Gönyeli Municipality Center of Social Activities, and coordinated its administration until 2013.

== Political career ==
In the 2013 parliamentary election, she was the candidate of the Republican Turkish Party in the Lefkoşa District, and was 6th on the party list. She received 18,175 votes, becoming 7th in her party and getting elected. Derya has re-elected in 2018 parliamentary elections.

Derya is a vocal and active advocate of communal gender equality, LGBT rights, and putting an emphasis on democratic values and freedom in education. She sparked controversy while taking office with an oath in the parliament, as she initially refused to recite the oath that put an emphasis on the integrity of the Turkish Republic of Northern Cyprus, claiming that it was "too masculine". She instead wanted to recite another oath emphasizing the struggle for a federal Cyprus and vehemently opposing any discrimination, including discrimination based on sexual orientation. In 2014, in a speech in the parliament, she stated that Greek Cypriot women had been raped as well as Turkish Cypriot women. This statement drew fierce reaction from some segments of the Turkish Cypriot society. In 2014, she initiated reform in the Penal Code, including gender-sensitive changes especially in the chapter of Sexual Offences. In 2015, she headed a committee, which drafted a new Family Law for Northern Cyprus. Her proposal included increased protection for boys that was only previously offered to girls and the freedom for women to choose their surnames as they like upon marriage. The law also advanced the protection in place for women fearing or suffering from violence.

Due to the rules of gender quota in the 2018 elections the ratio of women MPs rose from 8% to 18%. In 2018, together with two MPs from CTP she tabled legislation on Human Trafficking, Human Smuggling and Hate Speech. These suggestions were passed unanimously in a parliamentary vote in March 2020.
