= Mine Atlı =

Turkish Cypriot lawyer and politician

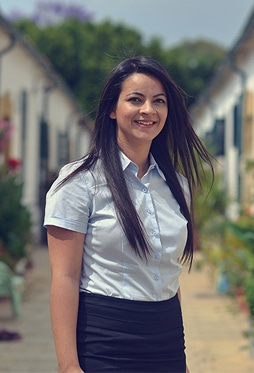

Chairman

Personal details
- Party: Communal Democracy Party

Mine Atlı is Turkish Cypriot politician and lawyer. She was a member of the Turkish Municipality of Nicosia's Municipal Parliament. She was elected as the chairman of the (TDP) Communal Democracy Party in the first extraordinary congress, filling the seat of Cemal Özyiğit who had resigned. Mine Atlı is the incumbent leader of the TDP.

As a feminist activist Mine Atli, as a member of the former Gender Advisory Team (GAT) contributed to a policy brief and report including recommendations on Implementing UNSCR 1325 Provisions on Women, Peace and Security in 2012.

Atlı made a post on Facebook on May 10, 2022, which was considered slander by Ersin Tatar who pressed charges.

== Awards ==
In 2019 Mine Atli received the Global Ties U.S. IVLP Alumni Award for Social Innovation and Change.
