= Antonis Paschalides =

Greek Cypriot lawyer and politician

Antonis Paschalides, also Antonios (Greek: Αντώνης Πασχαλίδης) is a Greek Cypriot lawyer, politician and member of DIKO (Democratic Party). On 29 February 2008 he was appointed by the President of the Republic of Cyprus as Minister of Commerce, Industry and Tourism, a position he held until 2019.

== Political career ==
On his return to Cyprus after his studies he became actively involved in the National Committee of Support of the Enclaved and was one of the founding members of the Refugee Associations “Eleftheri Eniaia Karpassia” (Free United Karpasia) and “Eleftheroi Yialousites” (Free Yialousa people). Along with others including the later President of the Republic of Cyprus Tassos Papadopoulos he co-founded the political party “Enosi Kentrou” which was later absorbed by DIKO of which he stayed a member until 2000. In 1988 he was appointed Member of the Air Transport Authority by the Council of Ministers (then under the Presidency of George Vassiliou) a position he held until February 1998. In 2000 he left DIKO to form a new political party “Komma Evrodimokratikis Ananeosis” which was later reabsorbed into DIKO in 2003. He later became a member of the Central and the Executive Committees of DIKO, and in February 2008, after the election of Demetris Christofias to the Presidency by the coalition of AKEL, DIKO and EDEK, he was appointed as Minister of Commerce, Industry and Tourism.

== Policies ==
He claims to have connections to the Middle East and former Soviet countries and was a supporter of the Cyprus golden passport scheme which came to an abrupt end in 2020 after harsh criticism.

=== Energy in Cyprus ===
He brought forward the issue of switching the energy production of Cyprus from oil to natural gas, a topic which had been in discussion for years. After the Cyprus sea bed was tested, Cyprus entered an agreement with Noble Energy for the exploitation of these natural resources. During his term in office, a delimitation of the Exclusive Economic Zone (EEZ) was signed with Lebanon and Israel. He facilitated the building of an oil and natural gas depot on the coast of Cyprus in the hope that it will one day serve as a regional trading hub.

=== Cyprus Tourism ===
The hugely UK dependent Cyprus tourism was badly hit by the continuing 2008 crisis with the lowest being an 11% decrease in tourism revenue. He sought to enter into agreements with previously non-existent tourist markets for Cyprus such as China, Israel. During his term, Russian tourism increased.

=== Cyprus Consumers' Rights ===
Under his term, there was three-day-old fuel shutdown which reached crisis point. In the end, he negotiated with a delegation from the petrol station owners and fuel companies to lift their strike measures.

=== Brussels ===
He was a strong supporter of abolishing or at least relaxing procedures for the issuance of visas for Russian citizens, a scheme that was later harshly criticised by the EU and other international players and forced the Cyprus government to end it abruptly.

Political offices
Preceded by Antonis Michaelides	Minister of Commerce, Industry and Tourism of the Republic of Cyprus; 29 February 2008–present	Incumbent
