= Praxoula Antoniadou =

Cypriot politician and businesswoman

Praxoula Antoniadou-Kyriacou Πραξούλα Αντωνιάδου Κυριακού

President of the United Democrats, Cyprus
- Incumbent
- Assumed office 2008
- Preceded by: Michalis Papapetrou

Minister for Commerce, Industry and Tourism
- In office July 2011 – March 2012
- Preceded by: Antonis Paschalides
- Succeeded by: Neoklis Sylikiotis

Personal details
- Born: Nicosia, Cyprus
- Party: United Democrats
- Spouse: Lysandros Kyriacou
- Education: London School of Economics
- Website: www.praxoula.org

Praxoula Antoniadou Kyriacou (born September 10, 1958) is a Cypriot economist, central banker, and politician. She served as Minister of Trade, Industry and Tourism of Cyprus from 2011 to 2012 and was president of the United Democrats, a liberal political party in Cyprus.

== Early life and education ==
Antoniadou-Kyriacou was born in Nicosia, Cyprus, and attended the English School. She received a BSc and MSc in Economics from the London School of Economics and Political Science.

== Career ==
Following her studies, she started working at the Central Bank of Cyprus. She held a managerial position with the Central Bank, where she served for 24 years. During her work at the central bank, she was engaged in macroeconomic analysis, policy formulation and management, and in statistics. She was also highly involved in European Union matters and served as coordinator of the Central Bank of Cyprus during the five-year period of the accession negotiations. She has also served as member of various committees of the European Central Bank and of EUROSTAT.

Throughout her career, Antoniadou-Kyriacou participated in a number of seminars and courses at the International Monetary Fund, the European Central Bank, EUROSTAT, the US Federal Reserve, the Bank of England, the Swiss National Bank and the Food and Agriculture Organization of the United Nations, as well as in seminars on management issues (CIIM, Dale Carnegie).

She is a member of the three ladies team of economists who have co-authored the award-winning trilogy of studies on "The Day After", concerning the economic benefits to accrue to all the Cypriots, as well as to Turkey and Greece once Cyprus is reunited.

== Political career ==
In her capacity as the President of the United Democrats, she worked within the political family of the European Liberal Democrats trying to promote the implementation of Liberal values such as freedom, democracy and respect of human rights. In accordance with the above, the United Democrats appreciated the unanimous adoption by the European Liberal, Democrat and Reform Party, in their November 2009 Barcelona Congress, of a resolution expressing support to the efforts for the attainment of an agreed solution to the Cyprus problem that will be reunifying Cyprus on the basis of a bizonal bicommunal federation.

As President of the United Democrats, Antoniadou-Kyriacou had participated in meetings organized in Istanbul by GPoT Center, TESEV and the German Liberals’ Friedrich Naumann Stiftung, aiming at building communication bridges between Greek and Turkish Cypriots and, especially, between Cyprus and Turkey. In the context of these meetings, she had the opportunity to meet with His-All Holiness Ecumenical Patriarch Bartholomew, as well with the Turkish Prime Minister Mr. Recep Tayyip Erdoğan.

She has also been a regular and active participant of the meetings of the leaders of the Greek Cypriot and Turkish Cypriot political parties meeting at Ledra Palace.

As a Minister of Energy, Trade, Industry & Tourism, she was fortunate to lead the discovery of natural gas offshore Cyprus, which she considers can and should be instrumental towards the achievement of Peace in Cyprus and between Cyprus and its neighbours.

In this regard, she has been the co-author (bicommunal studies) of many studies about the economic benefits of peace in the area of the Eastern Mediterranean.

In late 2012 Antoniadou-Kyriacou announced her intention to be a candidate for the Cypriot Presidential elections of 2013, running with the support of her party, the United Democrats.

== Personal life ==
Praxoula Antoniadou-Kyriacou is married to civil engineer Lysandros Kyriacou. They have two children: Semeli, an architect, and Theodoros, a civil engineer. She has a keen interest in music and she is an accomplished flutist. As an amateur musician she has participated in the television charity show DanSing for You in order to help children battling cancer.

== Offices held ==
Political offices
Preceded by Antonis Paschalides	Minister of Commerce, Industry and Tourism; 2011-2012	Succeeded by Neoklis Sylikiotis
Party political offices
Preceded by George Vassiliou	Leader of the United Democrats; 2008	Succeeded by Incumbent
